= Gaber pri Črmošnjicah =

- Location in Slovenia
- Coordinates: 45°39′14.94″N 15°8′3.15″E
- Country: Slovenia
- Traditional region: Lower Carniola
- Statistical region: Southeast Slovenia
- Municipality: Semič

Area
  - Total: 1.2 km^{2} (0.46 sq mi)

Population (2002)
  - Total: unknown

Gaber pri Črmošnjicah (pronounced [ˈɡàːbəɾ pɾi tʃəɾmɔˈʃnjìːtsax, -njíː-]; German: Gaber; Gottscheerish: Gabər) is a small settlement in the hills west of Semič in southeastern Slovenia. The area is part of the historical region of Lower Carniola and is now included in the Southeast Slovenia Statistical Region.

== Name ==
The name of the settlement was changed from Gaber to Gaber pri Črmošnjicah (literally, 'Gaber near Črmošnjice) in 1953. It is colloquially known as Kočevski Gaber (literally, 'Kočevje Gaber'). The toponym Gaber is relatively common in Slovenia and is derived from the common noun gaber 'hornbeam', thus referring to the local vegetation.

== History ==
Gaber pri Črmošnjicah was not mentioned in the land registries of 1574 or 1770, and so it was presumably founded relatively late. Before the Second World War, the village had three houses and a population of 13. The population worked as day laborers and cultivated fields near their houses. After the Gottschee Germans were evicted from the region in the fall of 1941, Gaber pri Črmošnjicah was uninhabited. It was burned by the Italians during the Rog Offensive in the summer of 1942, leaving the ruins of four houses and several cisterns containing water unfit for drinking. The remaining hay fields were managed by the Črnomelj Collective Farm (Slovene: KZ Črnomelj). The former Kočevje German village of Vimolj (German: Weiderzug) is located above Gaber pri Črmošnjicah. The only settlement at the site today is the Totter farm.
