= Vrtača pri Semiču =

Part of Semič, a town in Slovenia

- Location in Slovenia
- Coordinates: 45°39′45″N 15°11′28″E
- Country: Slovenia
- Traditional region: Lower Carniola
- Statistical region: Southeast Slovenia
- Municipality: Semič
- Elevation: 220 m (720 ft)

Population (2002)
  - Total: 0

Vrtača pri Semiču (pronounced [ʋəɾˈtaːtʃa pɾi ˈseːmitʃu]) is a former settlement in the Municipality of Semič in southern Slovenia. The area is part of the traditional region of Lower Carniola and is now included in the Southeast Slovenia Statistical Region. Its territory is now part of the town of Semič.

== Name ==
The name of the settlement was changed from Vrtača to Vrtača pri Semiču in 1955.

== History ==
The village was established as a manor farm for Smuk Castle above Semič. A large square castle, the Strniš Manor (Slovene: Strnišev dvor) was later built at the site of the manor farm. It was purchased by local people in 1901, who divided up the castle inventory, sold the castle library and archive to a local merchant (who used the paper to wrap goods), and tore down the structure and planted an orchard in its place in 1902. During the Second World War, on 5 August 1942 several men were taken from the village by Italian authorities and sent to a concentration camp. The village was annexed and made part of the town of Semič in 2001, ending its existence as a separate settlement.

== Church ==
A church dedicated to Saint Thomas was recorded in the village in 1526. However, it no longer existed in the 17th century, when Johann Weikhard von Valvasor described the settlement.

== Other castles ==
Below the village is Vajd Castle (Slovene: Vajdov grad), also known as Pungrt Castle (German: Sternisenhof). It was mentioned in the 17th century by Valvasor. Its last owner was Janko Ogulin and after the Second World War it was used for various purposes. Above the village are the ruins of Kureč Castle (Slovene: Kureč grad), also known as Podturn (German: Thurn). Folk tradition also relates that an older castle, Boc Castle (Slovene: Bocovi grad), stood above Kureč Castle and that its noble owner squandered her fortune by feasting on fried chicken skin.
