= Lahinja, Semič =

Lahinja
- Location in Slovenia
- Coordinates: 45°36′58.50″N 15°6′51.30″E
- Country: Slovenia
- Traditional region: Lower Carniola
- Statistical region: Southeast Slovenia
- Municipality: Semič
- Elevation: 647.6 m (2,125 ft)

Population (2002)
  - Total: none

Lahinja (pronounced [ˈlaːxinja]; also Lahinja pri Sredgori, in older sources Lahina; German: Lachina or Lachina bei Mittenwald; Gottscheerish: Lachinə) is a remote abandoned settlement in the Municipality of Semič in southern Slovenia. The area is part of the traditional region of Lower Carniola and is now included in the Southeast Slovenia Statistical Region. Its territory is now part of the village of Planina.

== Name ==
The name Lahinja is shared with the Lahinja River. If the names share the same origin, then it is derived from *Vlahinja, based on the root *Vlah and originally referring to pre-Slavic Romanized Celtic inhabitants of the area but also applied to later Uskok settlers in the region. Another theory derives the name of the village from Middle High German lâchen 'to mark trees with a blaze'. In the past the German name was Lachina.

== History ==
Lahinja was a Gottschee German village. In the land registry of 1574 the village had three full farms divided into six half-farms with seven owners, corresponding to a population between 25 and 30. The village attained its maximum population in 1880, with 56 people living in nine houses. It had five houses and a population of only 32 in 1931. At this time, the economy of the village was based on raising animals, tending vineyards at Rodine, and selling firewood, logs, and wooden goods. The original inhabitants were evicted from the village on 24 November 1941. It was burned by Italian troops in the summer of 1942 during the Rog Offensive and was never rebuilt.
