= Vimolj, Semič =

Vimolj
- Location in Slovenia
- Coordinates: 45°39′39″N 15°8′10″E
- Country: Slovenia
- Traditional region: Lower Carniola
- Statistical region: Southeast Slovenia
- Municipality: Semič
- Elevation: 636.6 m (2,089 ft)

Population (2002)
  - Total: 0

Vimolj (pronounced [ˈʋiːmɔl], also spelled Vimol; German: Wiederzug or Widerzug) is a remote abandoned settlement in the Municipality of Semič in southern Slovenia. The area is part of the traditional region of Lower Carniola and is now included in the Southeast Slovenia Statistical Region. Its territory is now part of the village of Srednja Vas.

== Name ==
The name Vimolj is shared with two other villages: Vimolj near Banja Loka and Vimolj pri Predgradu. The spelling Vimolj is a hypercorrection of older Vimol, from the Slavic common noun *vymolъ 'promontory, elevated land between two valleys'. Vimolj is located on a promontory between the valley of Wild Creek (Divji potok) to the southwest and a valley around Rožni Dol to the east.

== History ==
Vimolj was a Gottschee German village founded in the 17th century. In 1931 the village consisted of seven houses. The Gottschee Germans were expelled from the village in the winter of 1941–1942. Italian troops burned the village during the summer of 1942. In 1965 the Smuk Hunting Club of Semič built a hunter's lodge at the site. The site of the former village is registered as cultural heritage.

== Church ==
The ruins of Saint Anne's Church stand on the north side of the former village, along the forest road to the hunter's lodge. The church was burned by Italian troops during the Rog Offensive in the summer of 1942. The ruins of the church include the belfry and the outside walls of the church's rectangular nave and chancel.
