= Osojnik, Semič =

Osojnik
- Location in Slovenia
- Coordinates: 45°40′50.29″N 15°12′44.78″E
- Country: Slovenia
- Traditional region: Lower Carniola
- Statistical region: Southeast Slovenia
- Municipality: Semič

Area
  - Total: 2.71 km^{2} (1.05 sq mi)
- Elevation: 352.6 m (1,157 ft)

Population (2002)
  - Total: 104

Osojnik (pronounced [ɔˈsoːi̯nik]) is a settlement north of Semič in southeastern Slovenia. The area is part of the traditional region of Lower Carniola. The municipality is now included in the Southeast Slovenia Statistical Region.

== Name ==
Osojnik was attested in written sources in 1477 as Ossoynigk and Ossenigkh (and in 1674 as Ossoinigkh). The name is derived from the Slovene common noun osoje 'shady side' via the derived adjective osojen 'shady', referring to its geographical location.

== History ==
During the feudal era, Osojnik belonged to the Dominion of Gradac, although the vineyards were controlled by the Dominion of Krupa. The freeholder Janez Konda served as a judicial officer in Osojnik from 1727 to 1738. On 4 July 1943, Italian troops burned nearly the entire village while withdrawing before a Partisan attack at Hom Hill.

== Notable people ==
Notable people that were born or lived in Osojnik include:

- Martin Konda (1872–1922), American editor and publisher
