= Sovinek =

- Location in Slovenia
- Coordinates: 45°38′51.76″N 15°12′18.28″E
- Country: Slovenia
- Traditional region: Lower Carniola
- Statistical region: Southeast Slovenia
- Municipality: Semič

Area
  - Total: 1.0 km^{2} (0.39 sq mi)

Population (2013)
  - Total: 58
  - Density: 60/km^{2} (160/sq mi)
- Postal code: 8333

Sovinek (pronounced [sɔˈʋiːnək]) is a small village in the Municipality of Semič in southeastern Slovenia. Until 2001, the area was part of the settlements of Coklovca, Oskoršnica, and Praprot. The village is part of the traditional region of White Carniola and is included in the Southeast Slovenia Statistical Region.
