= Vimolj =

Vimolj may refer to several places in Slovenia:

- Vimolj, Kostel, a settlement in the Municipality of Kostel
- Vimolj, Semič, a settlement in the Municipality of Semič
- Vimolj pri Predgradu, a settlement in the Municipality of Kočevje
