= Mladica =

- Location in Slovenia
- Coordinates: 45°38′48″N 15°11′14″E
- Country: Slovenia
- Traditional region: Lower Carniola
- Statistical region: Southeast Slovenia
- Municipality: Semič
- Elevation: 224 m (735 ft)

Mladica (Slovene pronunciation: [mlaˈdiːtsa], German: Mladiza) is a former settlement in the Municipality of Semič in southeastern Slovenia. It is now part of the town of Semič. The area is part of the traditional region of Lower Carniola. The municipality is now included in the Southeast Slovenia Statistical Region.

== Geography ==
Mladica is a clustered settlement on a low outcropping with sinkholes southeast of Semič. There are tilled fields surrounding the former village, some of them on broad agricultural terraces. The soil is sandy and relatively fertile. There is a spring along the road through the village.

== History ==
According to the Semič land registry, Mladica consisted of two farms in 1536, 1550, and 1610.

During the Second World War, on September 27, 1942, Italian forces brought nine hostages to Mladica and shot them at the crossroads northeast of the village. A memorial was installed at the site in 1952. After the Italian capitulation in 1943, the Partisans operated a shoe workshop in Mladica and also stored leather in the village.

Mladica was annexed by the town of Semič in 2001, ending its existence as a separate village.
