= Nestoplja Vas =

- Location in Slovenia
- Coordinates: 45°37′42.93″N 15°10′51.41″E
- Country: Slovenia
- Traditional region: Lower Carniola
- Statistical region: Southeast Slovenia
- Municipality: Semič

Area
  - Total: 1.39 km^{2} (0.54 sq mi)
- Elevation: 214.5 m (704 ft)

Population (2002)
  - Total: 21

Nestoplja Vas (pronounced [ˈneːstɔplja ˈʋaːs]; Slovene: Nestoplja vas, German: Nestopelsdorf) is a small village in the Municipality of Semič in Slovenia. The area is part of the historical region of Lower Carniola. The municipality is now included in the Southeast Slovenia Statistical Region.

== Geography ==
Nestoplja Vas is a clustered village south of Semič on a level area with many sinkholes and planted in apple and plum orchards. The Belečnik Woods stands west of the settlement; it primarily consists of chestnut and oak trees. Fields and some vineyards lie to the south. The Močila Marsh lies west of the settlement in the valley towards Brezje pri Vinjem Vrhu; during rainy periods water collects in the marsh.

== Name ==
Nestoplja Vas was attested in written sources in 1414 as ze Nepleins (and as Neppleinsgeschiess in 1447). The name is derived from *Ne(o)stǫpľa vьsь 'Neostǫpa's village', referring to an early inhabitant of the place. In the past the German name was Nestopelsdorf.

== History ==
The settlement was listed in documents in the Auersperg archives in 1462. According to the Auersperg land registry of 1501, it consisted of four full farms, but two of them had been abandoned because of Ottoman attacks. A plaque on the wall of a house burned on 8 August 1942 commemorates three Partisans killed by Italian forces on 25 February 1942. From the end of October 1944 until the end of the Second World War, the Partisan General Staff maintained a bunker containing foodstuffs and leather in a house in the village.

== Church ==
The local church is located in the neighboring settlement of Starihov Vrh.
