= Hrib =

Hrib or Hřib may refer to:

== Places ==
=== Croatia ===
- Hrib, Croatia, a village near Čabar

=== Slovenia ===
- Hrib, Preddvor, a settlement
- Hrib, Šmarješke Toplice, a settlement
- Hrib nad Ribčami, a settlement near Moravče
- Hrib pri Cerovcu, a settlement near Semič
- Hrib pri Fari, a settlement near Kostel
- Hrib pri Hinjah, a settlement near Žužemberk
- Hrib pri Kamniku, a settlement near Kamnik
- Hrib pri Koprivniku, a settlement near Kočevje
- Hrib pri Orehku, a settlement near Novo Mesto
- Hrib pri Rožnem Dolu, a settlement near Semič
- Hrib–Loški Potok, a settlement
- Svetega Petra Hrib, a settlement near Škofja Loka (known as Hrib pri Zmincu, 1955–1994)

== People ==
- Zdeněk Hřib, Czech manager and politician
