= Preloge, Semič =

Preloge
- Location in Slovenia
- Coordinates: 45°40′4.62″N 15°9′27.78″E
- Country: Slovenia
- Traditional region: Lower Carniola
- Statistical region: Southeast Slovenia
- Municipality: Semič

Area
  - Total: 4.47 km^{2} (1.73 sq mi)
- Elevation: 411 m (1,348 ft)

Population (2002)
  - Total: 4

Preloge (pronounced [pɾɛˈloːɡɛ]) is a small settlement in the hills northwest of Semič in southeastern Slovenia. The area is part of the historical region of Lower Carniola. The Municipality of Semič is now included in the Southeast Slovenia Statistical Region.
