= Praproče, Semič =

Praproče
- Location in Slovenia
- Coordinates: 45°40′30.71″N 15°13′59.1″E
- Country: Slovenia
- Traditional region: Lower Carniola
- Statistical region: Southeast Slovenia
- Municipality: Semič

Area
  - Total: 1.32 km^{2} (0.51 sq mi)
- Elevation: 276.9 m (908 ft)

Population (2002)
  - Total: 15

Praproče (pronounced [ˈpɾaːpɾɔtʃɛ]) is a settlement northwest of Gradnik in the Municipality of Semič in Slovenia. The area is part of the historical region of Lower Carniola. The municipality is now included in the Southeast Slovenia Statistical Region.
