= Kleče =

Kleče may refer to several places in Slovenia:

- Kleče (Ljubljana), a former settlement in the Municipality of Ljubljana
- Kleče pri Dolu, a settlement in the Municipality of Dol pri Ljubljani
- Kleč, Kočevje, a settlement in the Municipality of Kočevje, also known as Kleče in older sources
- Kleč, Semič, a settlement in the Municipality of Semič, also known as Kleče in older sources
