= Sela pri Vrčicah =

- Location in Slovenia
- Coordinates: 45°39′0.2″N 15°8′51.57″E
- Country: Slovenia
- Traditional region: Lower Carniola
- Statistical region: Southeast Slovenia
- Municipality: Semič

Area
  - Total: 1.28 km^{2} (0.49 sq mi)
- Elevation: 509.2 m (1,671 ft)

Population (2002)
  - Total: 14

Sela pri Vrčicah (pronounced [ˈseːla pri ʋəɾˈtʃiːtsax]; in older sources also Sela pri Brčicah, German: Sela bei Wertschitsch) is a small settlement in the hills west of Semič in southeastern Slovenia. The area is part of the historical region of Lower Carniola and is now included in the Southeast Slovenia Statistical Region.
