= Maline pri Štrekljevcu =

- Location in Slovenia
- Coordinates: 45°41′54.71″N 15°13′10.91″E
- Country: Slovenia
- Traditional region: Lower Carniola
- Statistical region: Southeast Slovenia
- Municipality: Semič

Area
  - Total: 3.03 km^{2} (1.17 sq mi)
- Elevation: 439.6 m (1,442 ft)

Population (2002)
  - Total: 35

Maline pri Štrekljevcu (pronounced [ˈmaːlinɛ pɾi ˈʃtɾeːkljɛu̯tsu]) is a small village north of Štrekljevec in the Municipality of Semič in Slovenia. The area is part of the historical region of Lower Carniola. The municipality is now included in the Southeast Slovenia Statistical Region.

== Name ==
The name of the settlement was changed from Maline to Maline pri Štrekljevcu in 1955.

== Cultural heritage ==
Particularly in the northern part of the village many late 19th-century and early 20th-century traditional village houses and outbuildings are preserved and have been included on the Slovenian Ministry of Culture's Registry of Immovable Cultural Heritage.
