= Pugled, Semič =

Pugled
- Location in Slovenia
- Coordinates: 45°38′8.13″N 15°11′29.35″E
- Country: Slovenia
- Traditional region: Lower Carniola
- Statistical region: Southeast Slovenia
- Municipality: Semič

Area
  - Total: 0.76 km^{2} (0.29 sq mi)
- Elevation: 227.4 m (746 ft)

Population (2002)
  - Total: 19

Pugled (pronounced [ˈpuːɡlɛt]) is a small settlement near Semič in southeastern Slovenia. It lies in the White Carniola part of the historical region of Lower Carniola. The Municipality of Semič is now included in the Southeast Slovenia Statistical Region.

== Name ==
The name Pugled is derived from the Slovene word pogled 'bare hill with an open view' and referred to a landscape feature.
