= Pribišje =

- Location in Slovenia
- Coordinates: 45°40′55.46″N 15°9′35.78″E
- Country: Slovenia
- Traditional region: Lower Carniola
- Statistical region: Southeast Slovenia
- Municipality: Semič

Area
  - Total: 5.77 km^{2} (2.23 sq mi)
- Elevation: 491 m (1,611 ft)

Population (2002)
  - Total: 20

Pribišje (pronounced [pɾiˈbiːʃjɛ]; in older sources Perbišje, German: Pribischje, earlier Perbische) is a small settlement in the hills north of Semič in Slovenia. The Municipality of Semič is included in the Southeast Slovenia Statistical Region. The area is also part of the historical region of Lower Carniola.
