= Brezje pri Rožnem Dolu =

- Location in Slovenia
- Coordinates: 45°40′23.8″N 15°8′36.54″E
- Country: Slovenia
- Traditional region: Lower Carniola
- Statistical region: Southeast Slovenia
- Municipality: Semič

Area
  - Total: 0.36 km^{2} (0.14 sq mi)
- Elevation: 447.1 m (1,467 ft)

Population (2002)
  - Total: 12

Brezje pri Rožnem Dolu (pronounced [ˈbɾeːzjɛ pɾi ˈɾoːʒnɛm ˈdoːlu]; German: Bresie bei Rosenthal) is a small settlement in the Municipality of Semič in Slovenia. The municipality is included in the Southeast Slovenia Statistical Region. The entire area is part of the historical region of Lower Carniola.

== Name ==
The name Brezje pri Rožnem Dolu means 'Brezje near Rožni Dol', distinguishing it from other settlements named Brezje. The name Brezje is shared with several other places in Slovenia and is derived from the word brezje 'birch grove', referring to the local vegetation.
