= Sodji Vrh =

- Location in Slovenia
- Coordinates: 45°40′30″N 15°14′26.36″E
- Country: Slovenia
- Traditional region: Lower Carniola
- Statistical region: Southeast Slovenia
- Municipality: Semič

Area
  - Total: 1.41 km^{2} (0.54 sq mi)
- Elevation: 325 m (1,066 ft)

Population (2002)
  - Total: 28

Sodji Vrh (pronounced [ˈsoːdji ˈʋəɾx]; German: Sodjewerch) is a small settlement just north of the village of Gradnik in the Municipality of Semič in Slovenia. The area is part of the historical region of Lower Carniola. The municipality is now included in the Southeast Slovenia Statistical Region.

There is a small chapel-shrine in the village and many of the houses retain their original 18th- and 19th-century architecture.
