= Moverna Vas =

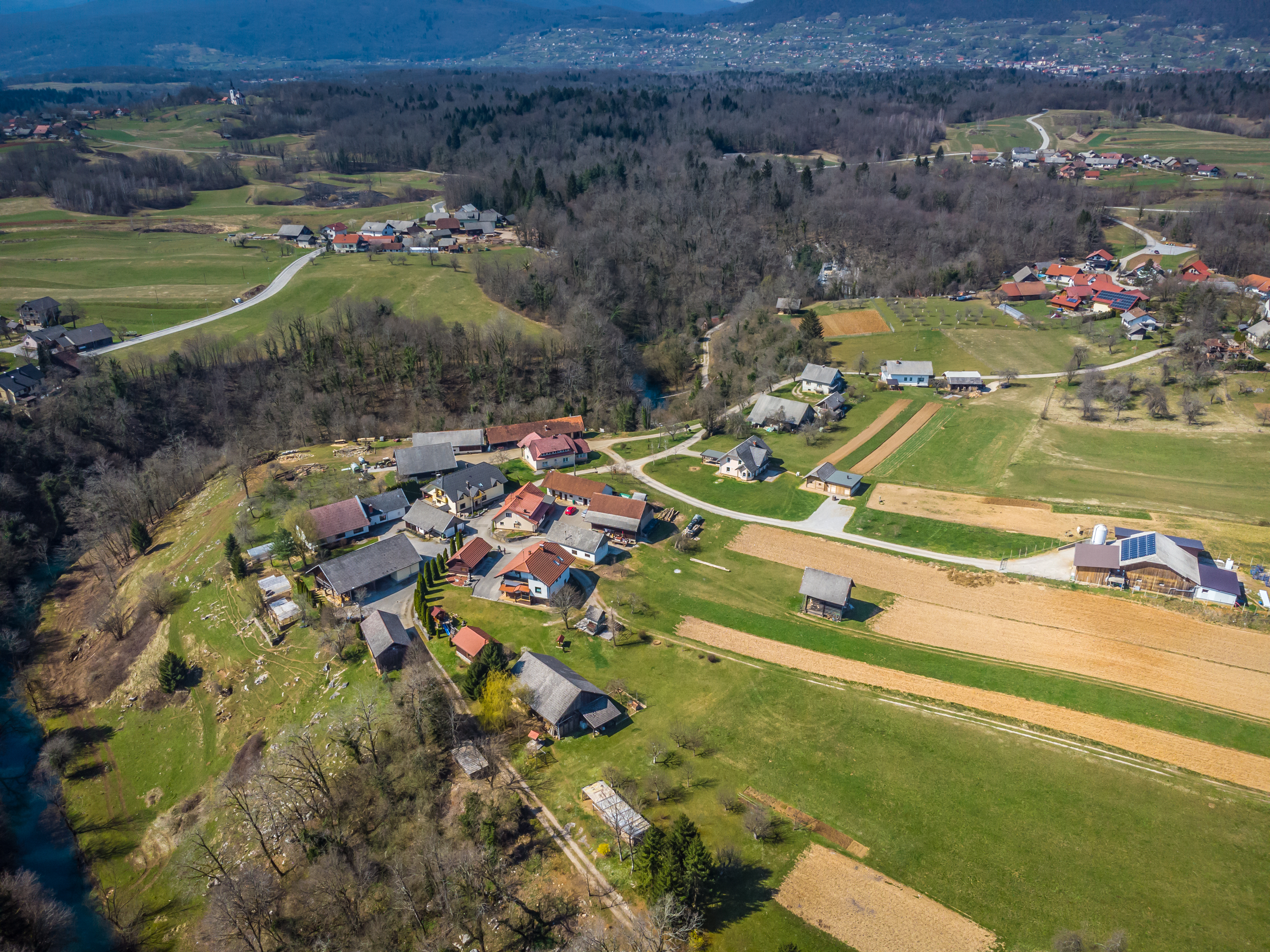

- Location in Slovenia
- Coordinates: 45°37′59″N 15°13′14″E
- Country: Slovenia
- Traditional region: Lower Carniola
- Statistical region: Southeast Slovenia
- Municipality: Semič

Area
  - Total: 0.78 km^{2} (0.30 sq mi)
- Elevation: 160 m (520 ft)

Population (2002)
  - Total: 30

Moverna Vas (pronounced [ˈmoːʋɛɾna ˈʋaːs]; Slovene: Moverna vas, German: Moverndorf) is a small village in the Municipality of Semič in Slovenia. It lies on the left bank near the source of the Krupa River, a left tributary of the Lahinja River. The area is part of the historical region of Lower Carniola. The municipality is now included in the Southeast Slovenia Statistical Region.

Artefacts from the Mesolithic, Neolithic, Chalcolithic, and Bronze Age periods have been identified in a karst cave known as the Jew's House (Slovene: Judovska hiša).
