= Krupa, Semič =

Krupa
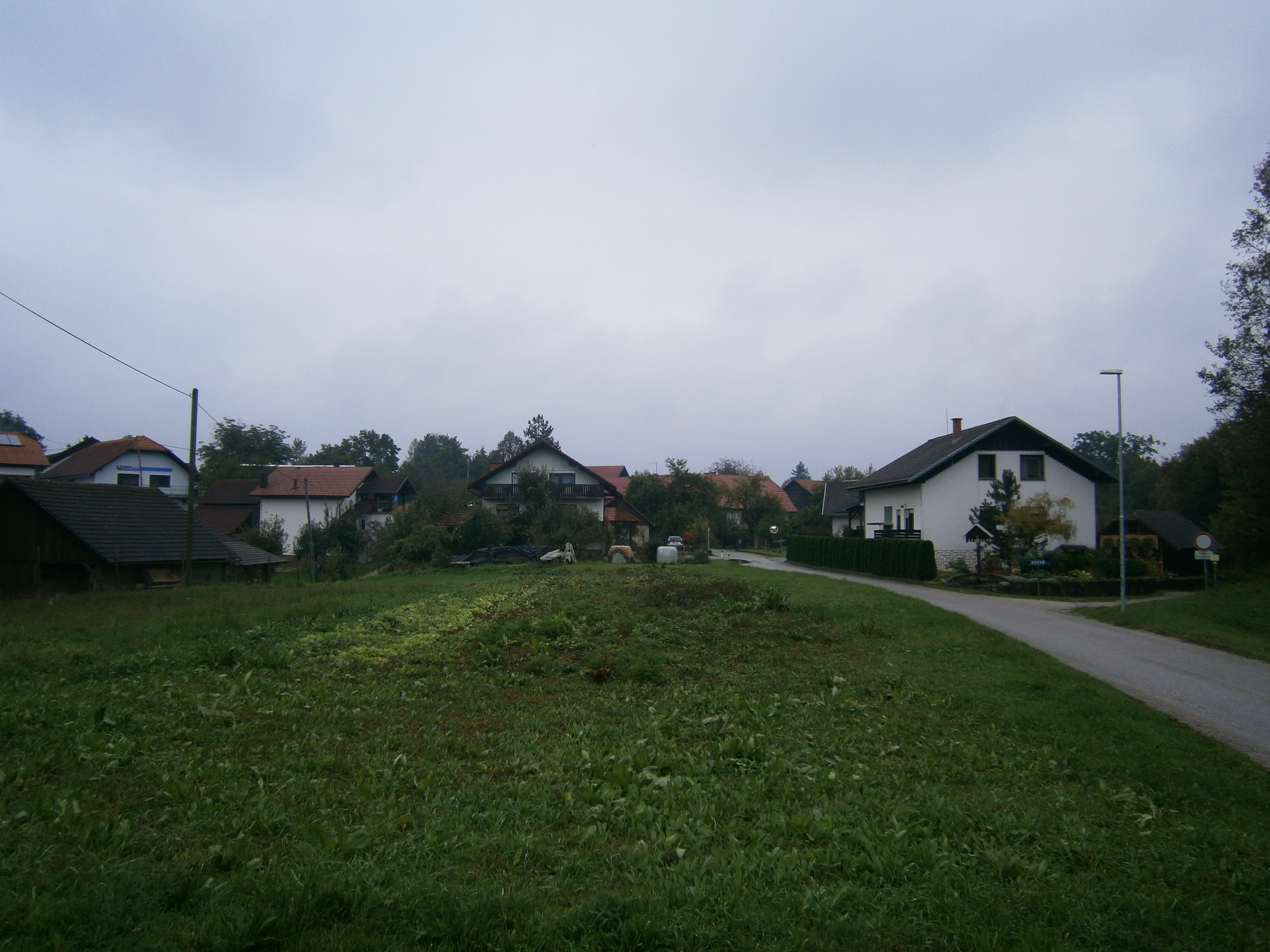

- Location in Slovenia
- Coordinates: 45°38′8.6″N 15°13′10.02″E
- Country: Slovenia
- Traditional region: White Carniola
- Statistical region: Southeast Slovenia
- Municipality: Semič

Area
  - Total: 3.04 km^{2} (1.17 sq mi)
- Elevation: 162.6 m (533 ft)

Population (2002)
  - Total: 47

Krupa (pronounced [ˈkɾuːpa]; German: Krupp) is a small village in the Municipality of Semič in Slovenia. It lies at the source of the Krupa River, a left tributary of the Lahinja River. The area is part of the historical region of White Carniola. The municipality is now included in the Southeast Slovenia Statistical Region.

This village is known for the spring of the Krupa River. This river is infamous because of its PCB pollution due to improper handling of PCB waste material, which has been used for decades by the capacitor manufacturing company Iskra Kondenzatorji in nearby Semič.
