= Lipovec, Semič =

Lipovec
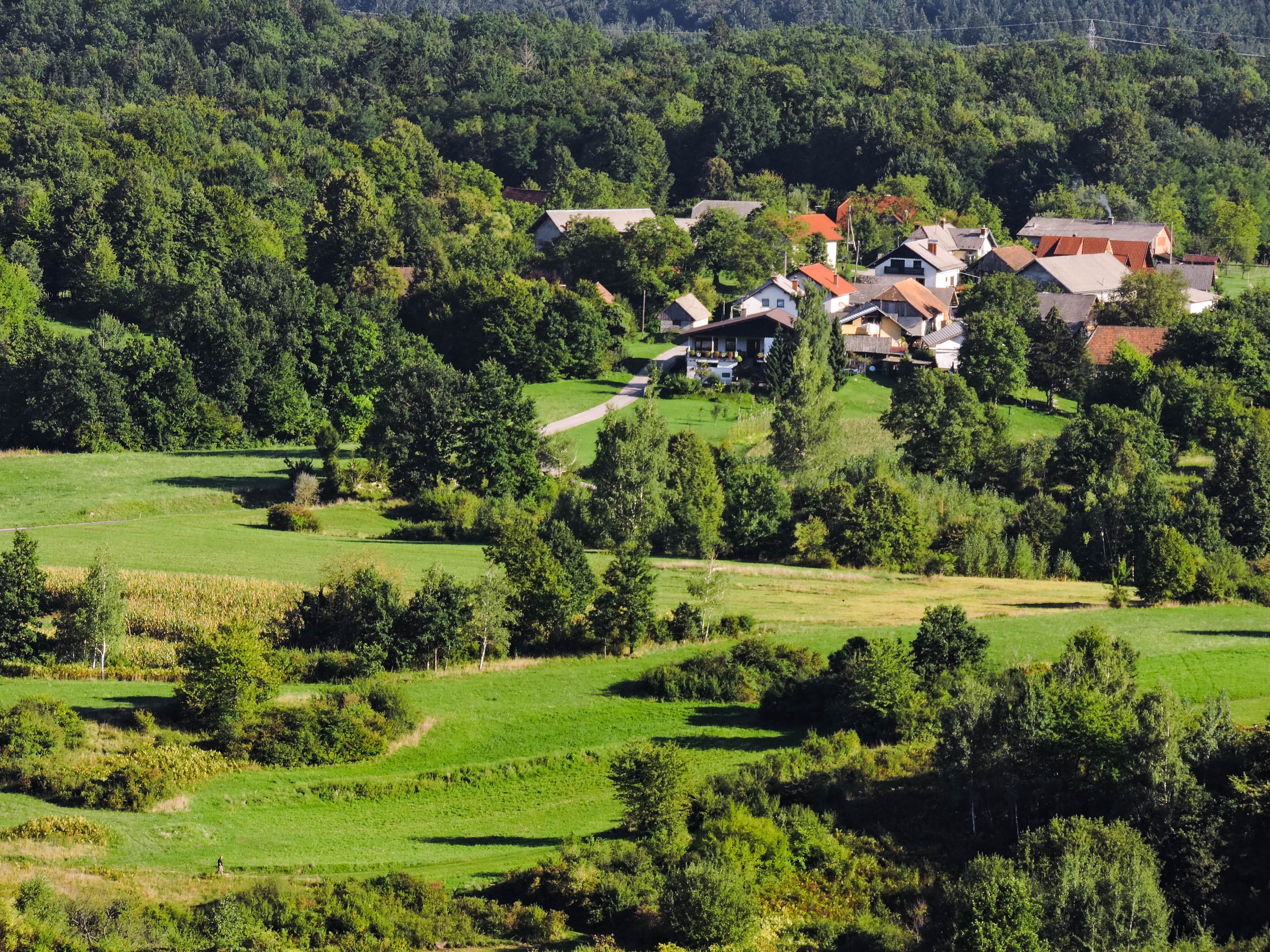

- Location in Slovenia
- Coordinates: 45°38′11.76″N 15°10′49.19″E
- Country: Slovenia
- Traditional region: Lower Carniola
- Statistical region: Southeast Slovenia
- Municipality: Semič

Area
  - Total: 0.81 km^{2} (0.31 sq mi)
- Elevation: 222.5 m (730 ft)

Population (2002)
  - Total: 31

Lipovec (pronounced [ˈliːpɔʋəts]) is a small settlement just south of Semič in southeastern Slovenia. The Municipality of Semič is part of the historical region of Lower Carniola. The municipality is now included in the Southeast Slovenia Statistical Region.
