= Črešnjevec pri Semiču =

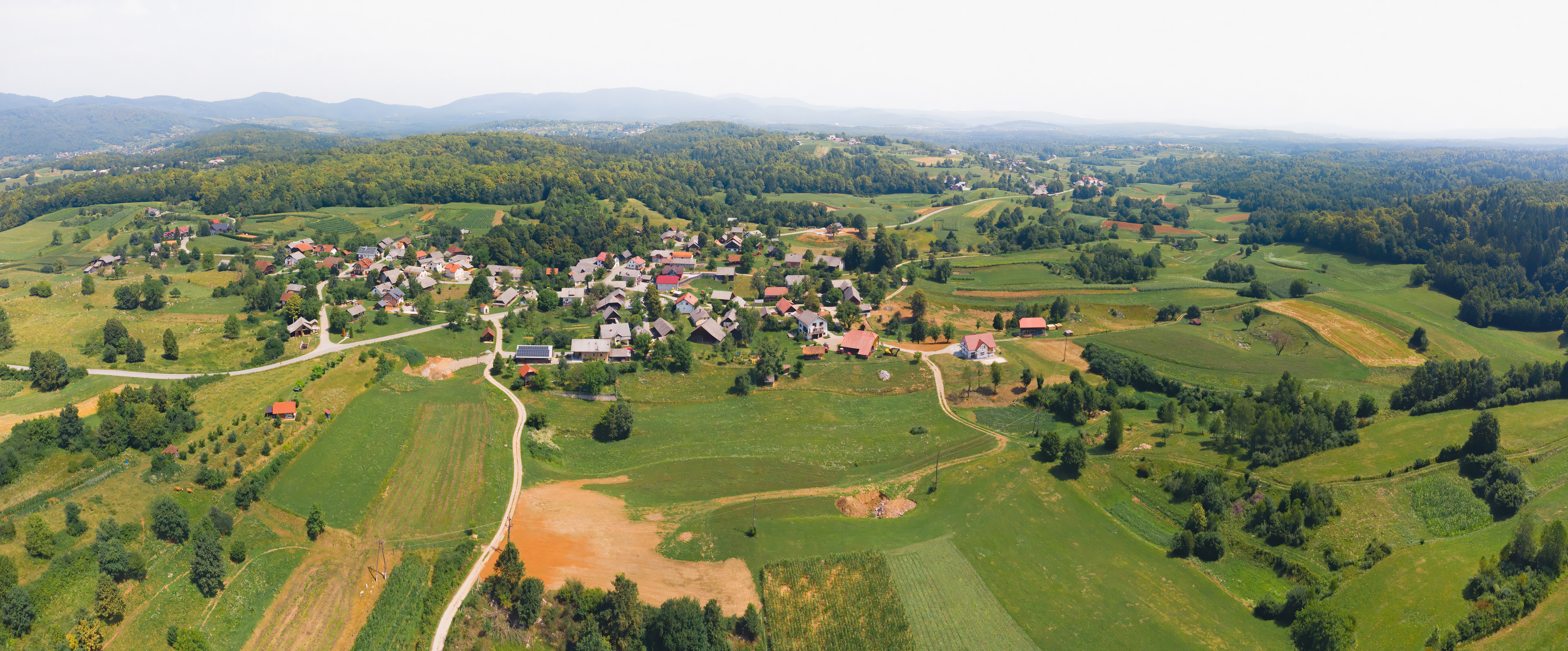

- Location in Slovenia
- Coordinates: 45°39′12″N 15°13′56″E
- Country: Slovenia
- Traditional region: Lower Carniola
- Statistical region: Southeast Slovenia
- Municipality: Semič

Area
  - Total: 2.41 km^{2} (0.93 sq mi)
- Elevation: 188.9 m (620 ft)

Population (2002)
  - Total: 109

Črešnjevec pri Semiču (pronounced [ˈtʃɾeːʃnjɛʋəts pɾi ˈseːmitʃu]; German: Kerschdorf) is a small village east of Semič in southeastern Slovenia. The Municipality of Semič is part of the historical region of Lower Carniola. The municipality is now included in the Southeast Slovenia Statistical Region.

== Name ==
The name of the settlement was changed from Črešnjevec to Črešnjevec pri Semiču in 1953.
