= Kleč, Semič =

Kleč
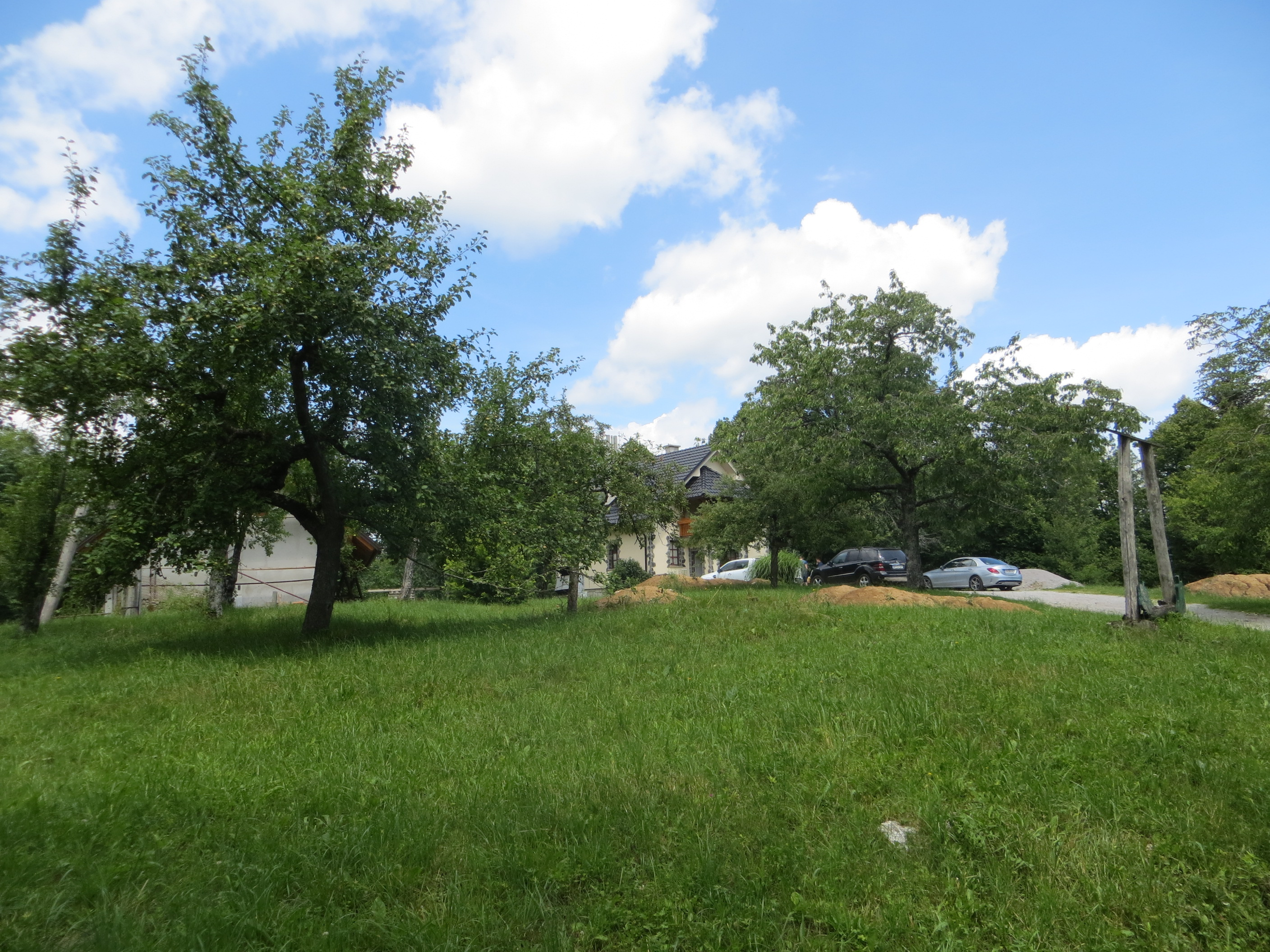

- Location in Slovenia
- Coordinates: 45°38′0.60″N 15°7′44.76″E
- Country: Slovenia
- Traditional region: Lower Carniola
- Statistical region: Southeast Slovenia
- Municipality: Semič
- Elevation: 635.7 m (2,086 ft)

Population (2002)
  - Total: none

Kleč (pronounced [ˈkleːtʃ]; in older sources also Kleče, German: Kletsch, also Kletsch bei Stockendorf) is a remote former settlement in the Municipality of Semič in southern Slovenia. The area is part of the traditional region of Lower Carniola and is now included in the Southeast Slovenia Statistical Region. Its territory is now part of the village of Planina.

== Name ==
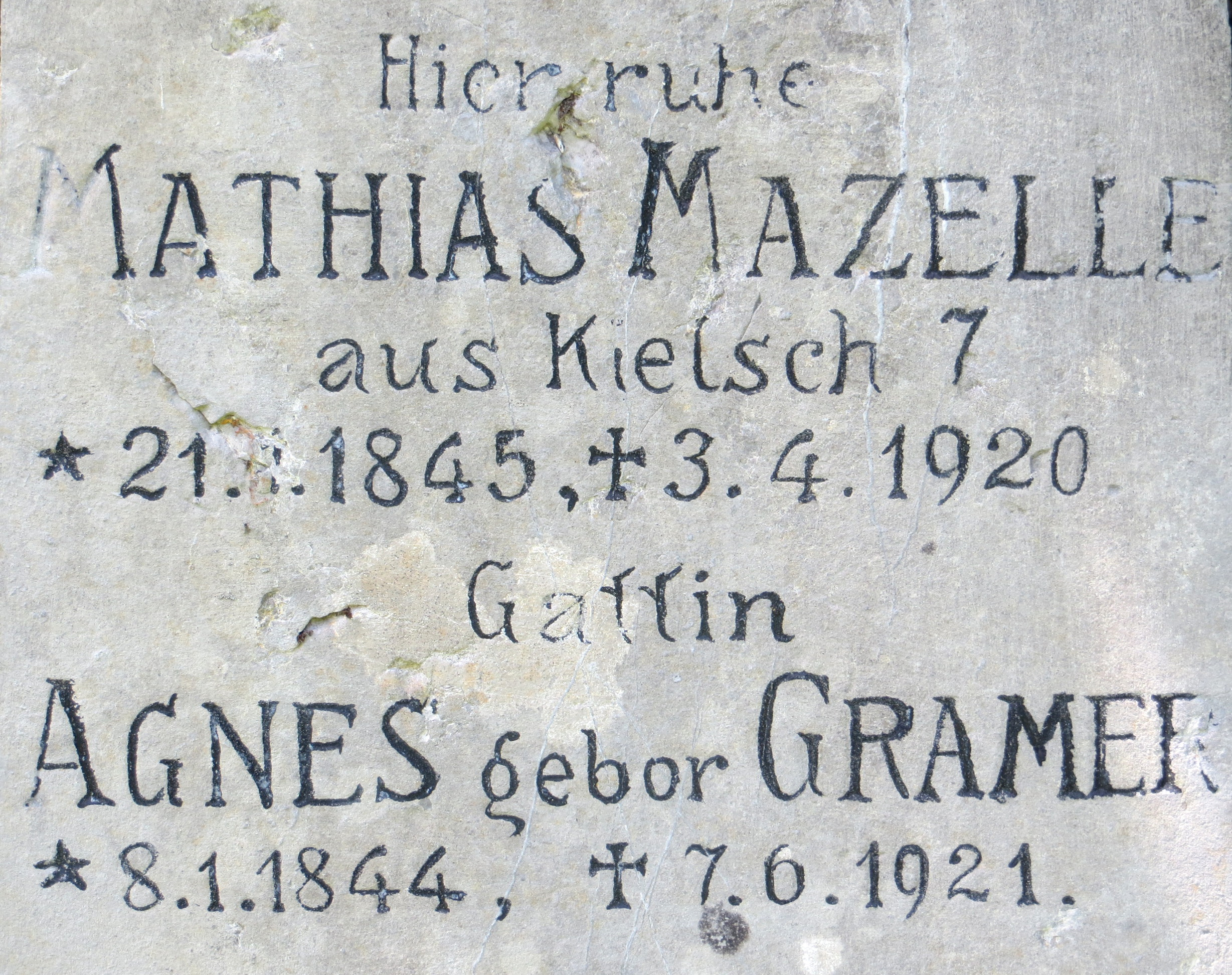
Gottschee German gravestone with the toponym Kletsch

The origin of the name Kleč is uncertain. Snoj observes that settlements named Kleč(e) generally lie along rivers and he connects this with the Slovene common noun kleč 'sandy or gravely river bank; gravely area covered with thin soil', referring to the local geology. Bezlaj also mentions the possibility of derivation from *klękъ 'small branching hills'. Another possibility is that it is derived from kleč with the meaning 'cliff'. Petschauer suggests that the name is derived from klet with the meaning 'shed, shack'.

== History ==
Kleč was a Gottschee German village. It was one of the more recent Gottschee settlements, founded after 1558 in a group of about 25 new settlements. In the land registry of 1574 the settlement had two full farms divided into four half-farms plus an additional eighth-farm, corresponding to a population between 25 and 30. In 1770 there were 11 houses in the settlement. Its population peaked at 53 in 1890, followed by a decline due to large-scale emigration to the United States. In 1931 the village included six houses and a population of 29. Before the Second World War, the economy of the village was based on raising animals, growing grapes, and selling wooden ware, logs, and firewood. The original residents were evicted on 25 November 1941. Italian troops burned the village during the Rog Offensive on 26 August 1942 and it was not rebuilt after the war. There was a Partisan camp for some time in the forest below Kleč. A Partisan field hospital operated here in the fall of 1943. A hunter's house was built at the site in the 1950s. The entire former village site is registered as cultural heritage.

== Church ==
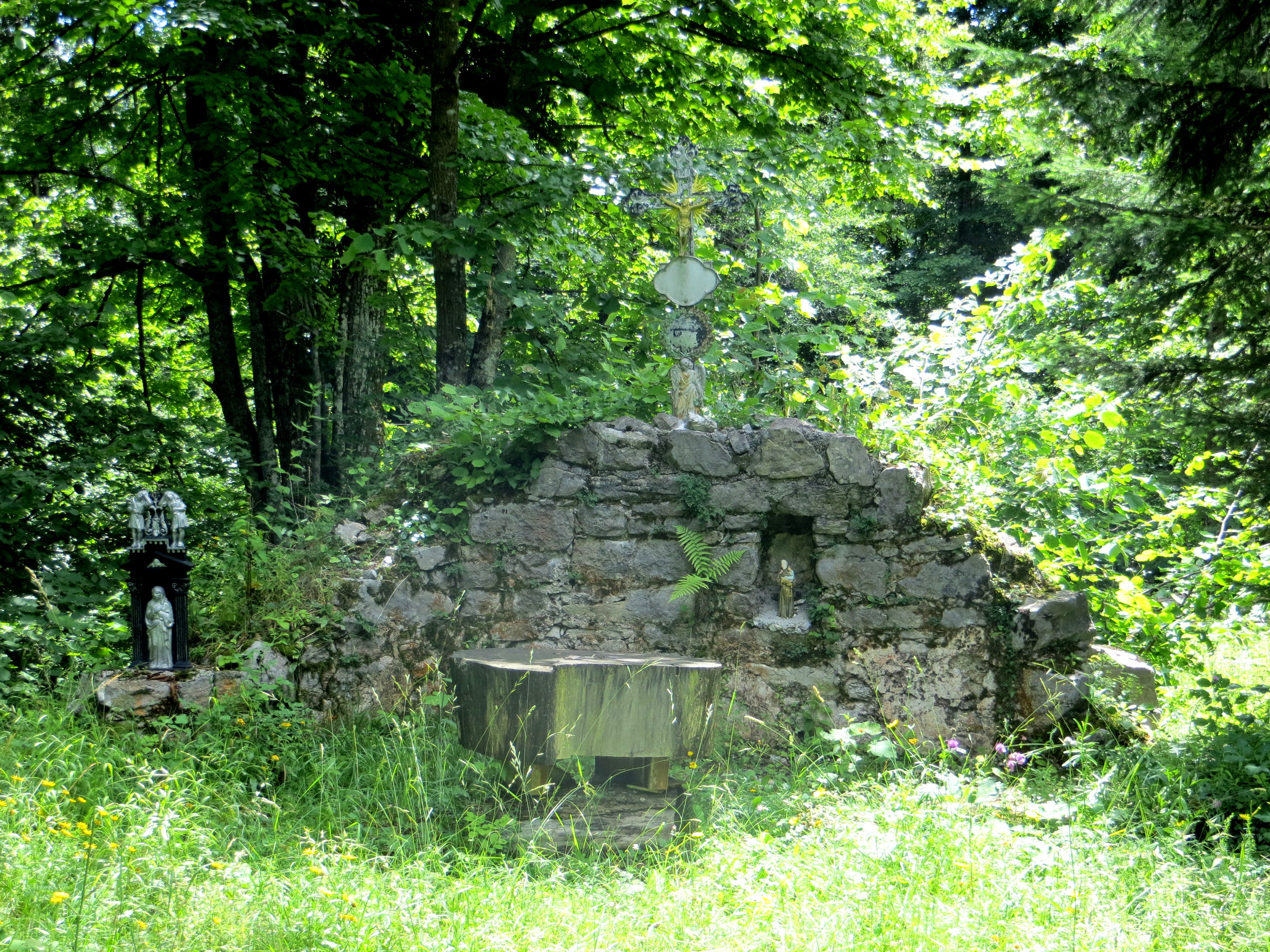
Remains of Saint Anthony the Great Church

A chapel of ease dedicated to Saint Anthony the Great stood southwest of the village. It dated to the end of the 17th century. A 1741 visitation record reported that it was dedicated to Saint Anthony of Padua. The church was destroyed after the Second World War. Two of its bells were sold to the church in Jugorje pri Metliki and a smaller bell was stolen. The clock was taken to Štrekljevec. The furnishings of the church were looted, and its building stones were crushed and used to repair the roads. Visible remnants of the church include part of the wall from the altar area and the floor, some remnants of cast-iron grave markers, and a small statue of a saint preserved in a niche.
