= Gornje Laze =

- Location in Slovenia
- Coordinates: 45°41′36.01″N 15°8′57.53″E
- Country: Slovenia
- Traditional region: Lower Carniola
- Statistical region: Southeast Slovenia
- Municipality: Semič

Area
  - Total: 0.66 km^{2} (0.25 sq mi)
- Elevation: 455.1 m (1,493 ft)

Population (2002)
  - Total: 27

Gornje Laze (pronounced [ˈɡoːɾnjɛ ˈlaːzɛ]; German: Oberlase) is a small settlement in the Municipality of Semič in southeastern Slovenia. The municipality is included in the Southeast Slovenia Statistical Region. The area is part of the historical region of Lower Carniola.
