= Vrčice =

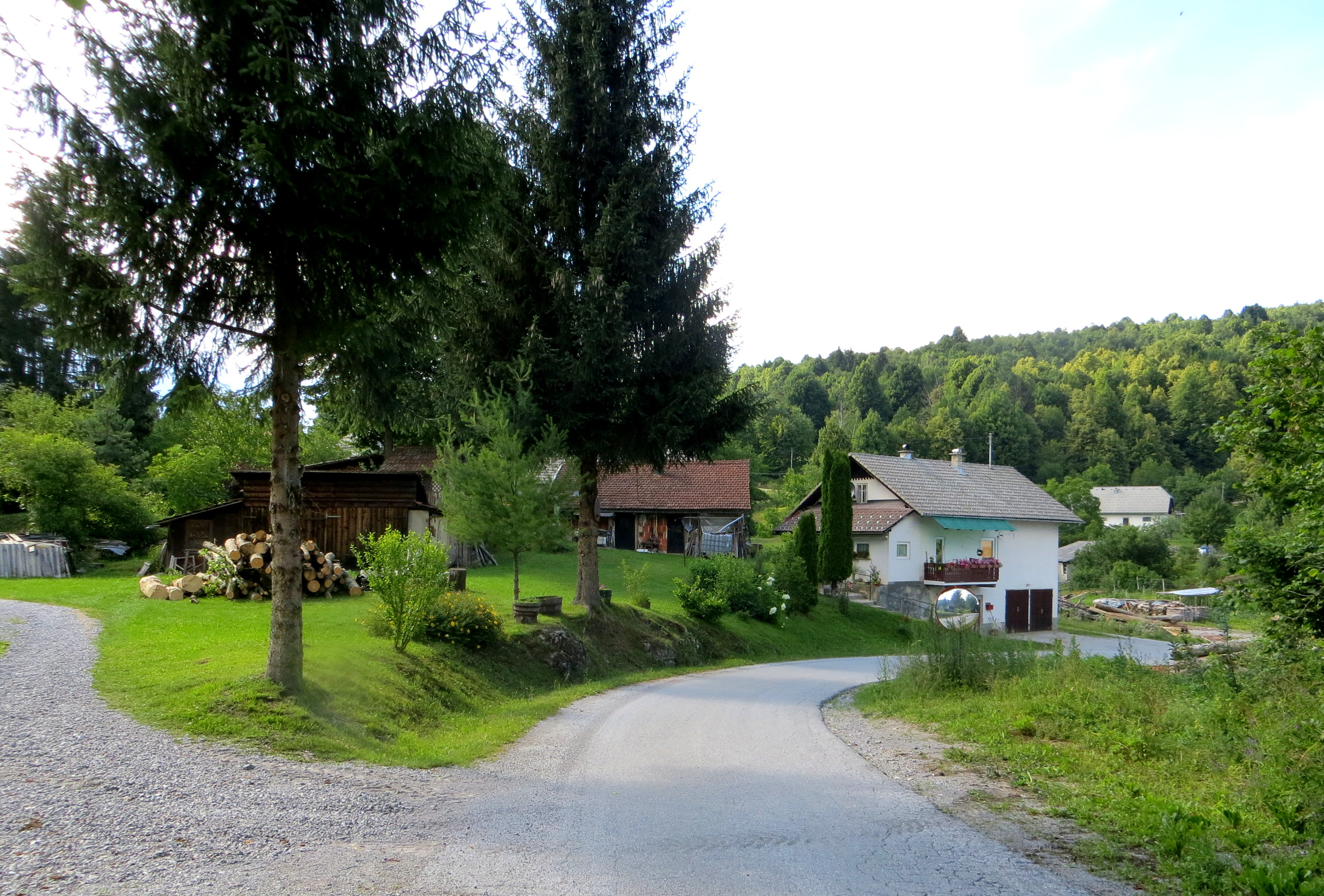

- Location in Slovenia
- Coordinates: 45°38′50.83″N 15°8′33.07″E
- Country: Slovenia
- Traditional region: Lower Carniola
- Statistical region: Southeast Slovenia
- Municipality: Semič

Area
  - Total: 0.75 km^{2} (0.29 sq mi)
- Elevation: 481.3 m (1,579 ft)

Population (2002)
  - Total: 48

Vrčice (pronounced [ʋəɾˈtʃiːtsɛ]; in older sources also Brčice, German: Wertschitz or Wertschitsch) is a small settlement in the Municipality of Semič in Slovenia. The area is part of the historical region of Lower Carniola. The municipality is now included in the Southeast Slovenia Statistical Region.

== Name ==
The Slovene name Vrčice is believed to be derived from the German name Wertschitz and that, in turn, from the Slavic prepositional phrase *vъ rěčicě 'in/at the creek'. Vrčica Creek flows through the village.

== Church ==
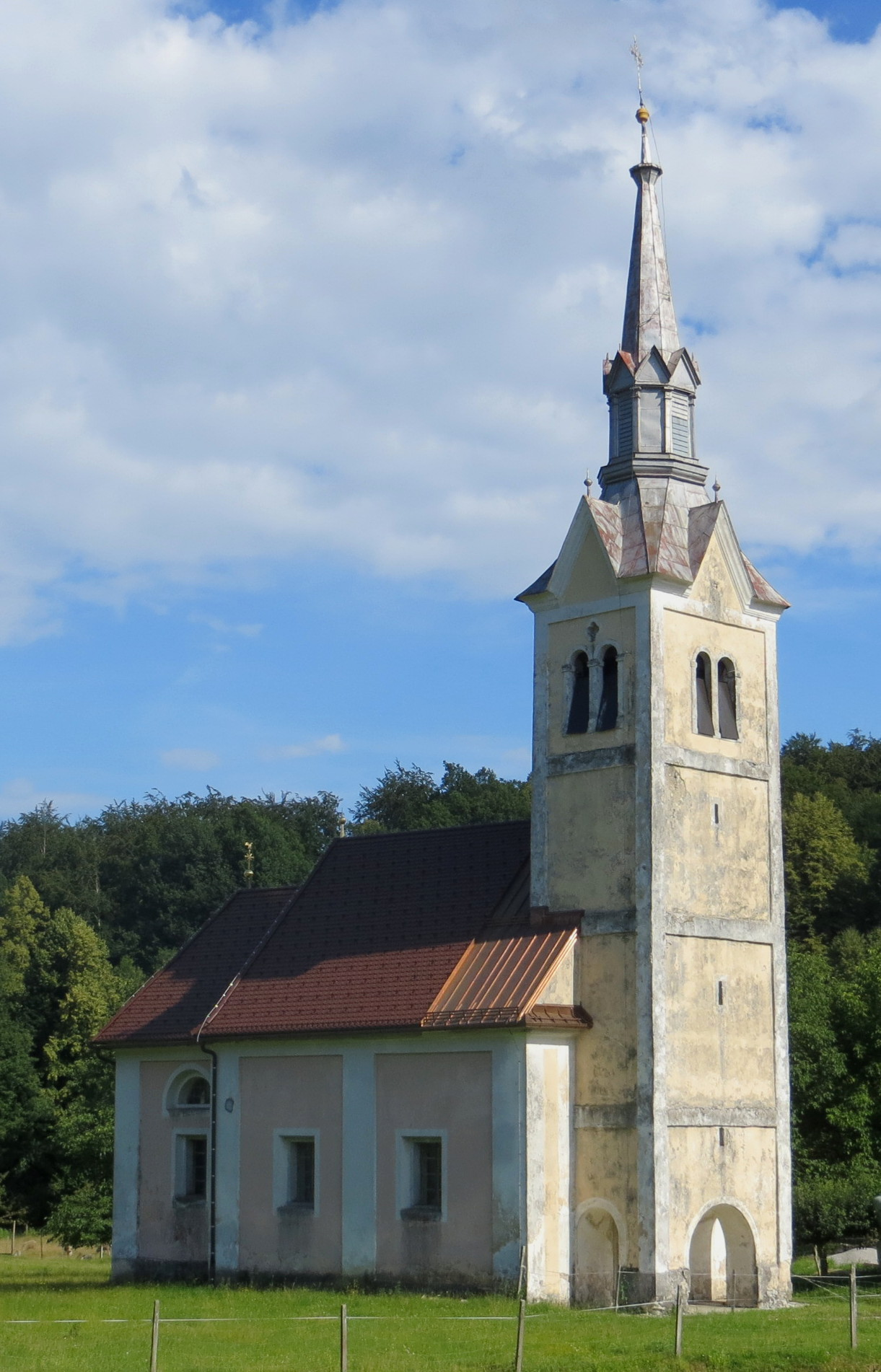
Assumption Church

The local church is dedicated to the Assumption of Mary and belongs to the Parish of Semič. It dates to the mid-18th century.
