= Trebnji Vrh =

- Village
- Location in Slovenia
- Coordinates: 45°38′6.97″N 15°10′5.31″E
- Country: Slovenia
- Traditional region: Lower Carniola
- Statistical region: Southeast Slovenia
- Municipality: Semič

Area
  - Total: 0.31 km^{2} (0.12 sq mi)
- Elevation: 237.7 m (780 ft)

Population (2002)
  - Total: 12

Trebnji Vrh (pronounced [ˈtɾeːbnji ˈʋəɾx]; German: Trebenwerch) is a small settlement in the Municipality of Semič in Slovenia. It lies in the hills south of Semič in the historical region of Lower Carniola. The municipality is now included in the Southeast Slovenia Statistical Region.
