= Potoki, Semič =

Village in Semič, Slovenia

Potoki
- Location in Slovenia
- Coordinates: 45°40′9.2″N 15°8′52.67″E
- Country: Slovenia
- Traditional region: Lower Carniola
- Statistical region: Southeast Slovenia
- Municipality: Semič

Area
  - Total: 1.38 km^{2} (0.53 sq mi)
- Elevation: 418.7 m (1,374 ft)

Population (2002)
  - Total: 17

Potoki (pronounced [pɔˈtoːki]) is a village in the Municipality of Semič in Slovenia. The railway line from Novo Mesto to Metlika runs just east of the settlement. The area is part of the historical region of Lower Carniola. The municipality is now included in the Southeast Slovenia Statistical Region.
