= Kal, Semič =

Kal
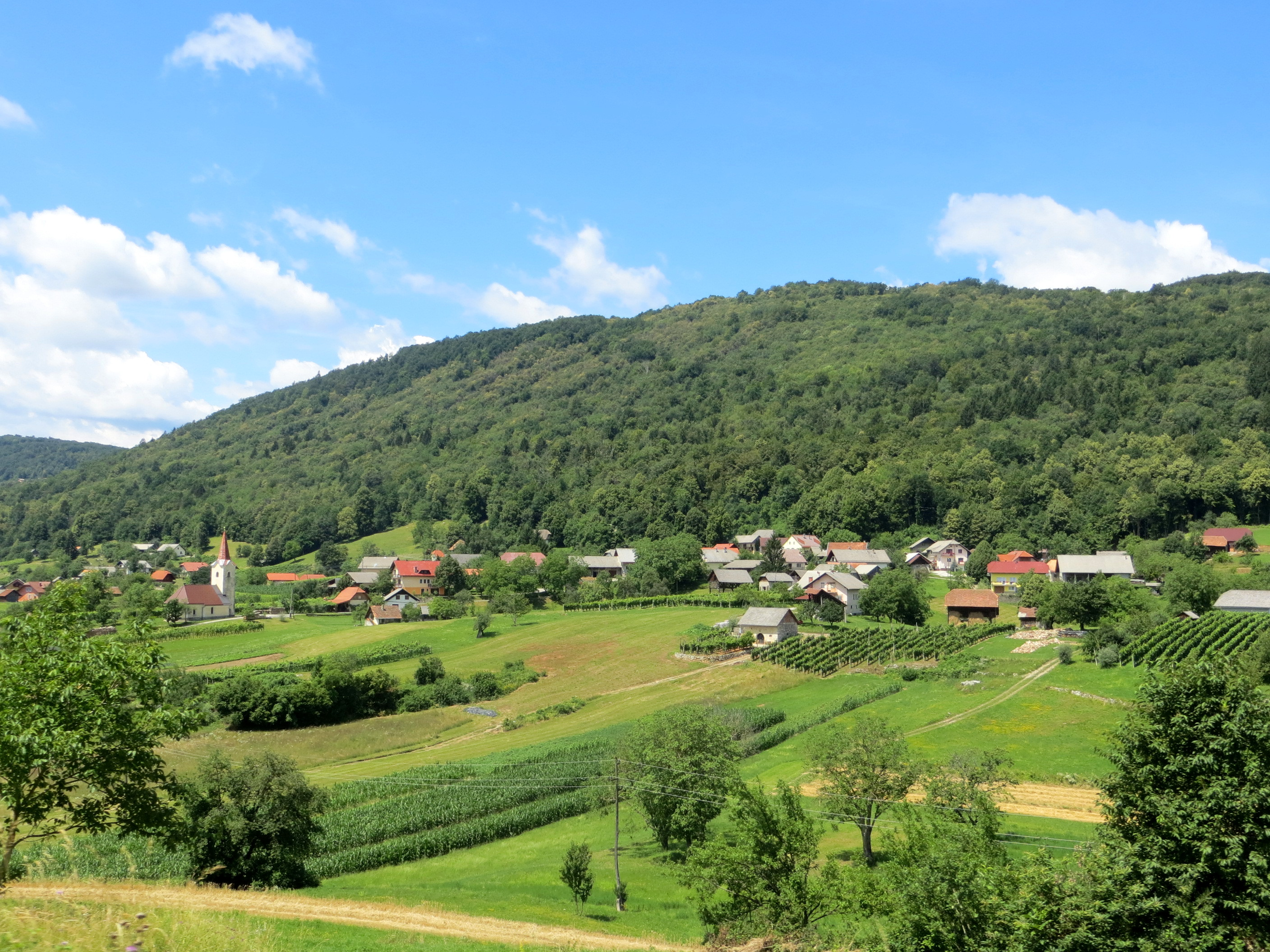

- Location in Slovenia
- Coordinates: 45°40′30.23″N 15°12′33.61″E
- Country: Slovenia
- Traditional region: Lower Carniola
- Statistical region: Southeast Slovenia
- Municipality: Semič

Area
  - Total: 1.46 km^{2} (0.56 sq mi)
- Elevation: 285 m (935 ft)

Population (2002)
  - Total: 87

Kal (pronounced [ˈkaːu̯]) is a village in the Municipality of Semič in Slovenia. The area is part of the historical region of Lower Carniola. The municipality is now included in the Southeast Slovenia Statistical Region.

The local church is dedicated to Saint Leonard (Slovene: sveti Lenart) and belongs to the Parish of Semič. It dates to the 18th century.
