= Brezova Reber =

- Location in Slovenia
- Coordinates: 45°41′28.83″N 15°12′48.62″E
- Country: Slovenia
- Traditional region: Lower Carniola
- Statistical region: Southeast Slovenia
- Municipality: Semič

Area
  - Total: 1.95 km^{2} (0.75 sq mi)
- Elevation: 457 m (1,499 ft)

Population (2002)
  - Total: 39

Brezova Reber (pronounced [ˈbɾeːzɔʋa ˈɾeːbəɾ]) is a small settlement in the Municipality of Semič in Slovenia. The area is part of the historical region of Lower Carniola. The municipality is now included in the Southeast Slovenia Statistical Region.

== Name ==
Brezova Reber was attested in written sources as Pirchleyttenn in 1463 and Pirkhleytten in 1467.

== Church ==
The local church is dedicated to Saint Catherine and belongs to the Parish of Semič. It is an 18th-century Baroque church built on the site of an earlier church mentioned in written documents dating to 1526.
