= Omota =

- Location in Slovenia
- Coordinates: 45°39′41.23″N 15°13′18.24″E
- Country: Slovenia
- Traditional region: Lower Carniola
- Statistical region: Southeast Slovenia
- Municipality: Semič

Area
  - Total: 1.33 km^{2} (0.51 sq mi)
- Elevation: 238.9 m (784 ft)

Population (2002)
  - Total: 45

Omota (pronounced [ɔˈmoːta]) is a small settlement in the Municipality of Semič in Slovenia. It lies northeast of Semič, just off the local road to Gradnik. The area is part of the historical region of Lower Carniola. The municipality is now included in the Southeast Slovenia Statistical Region.
