= Srednja Vas, Semič =

Srednja Vas
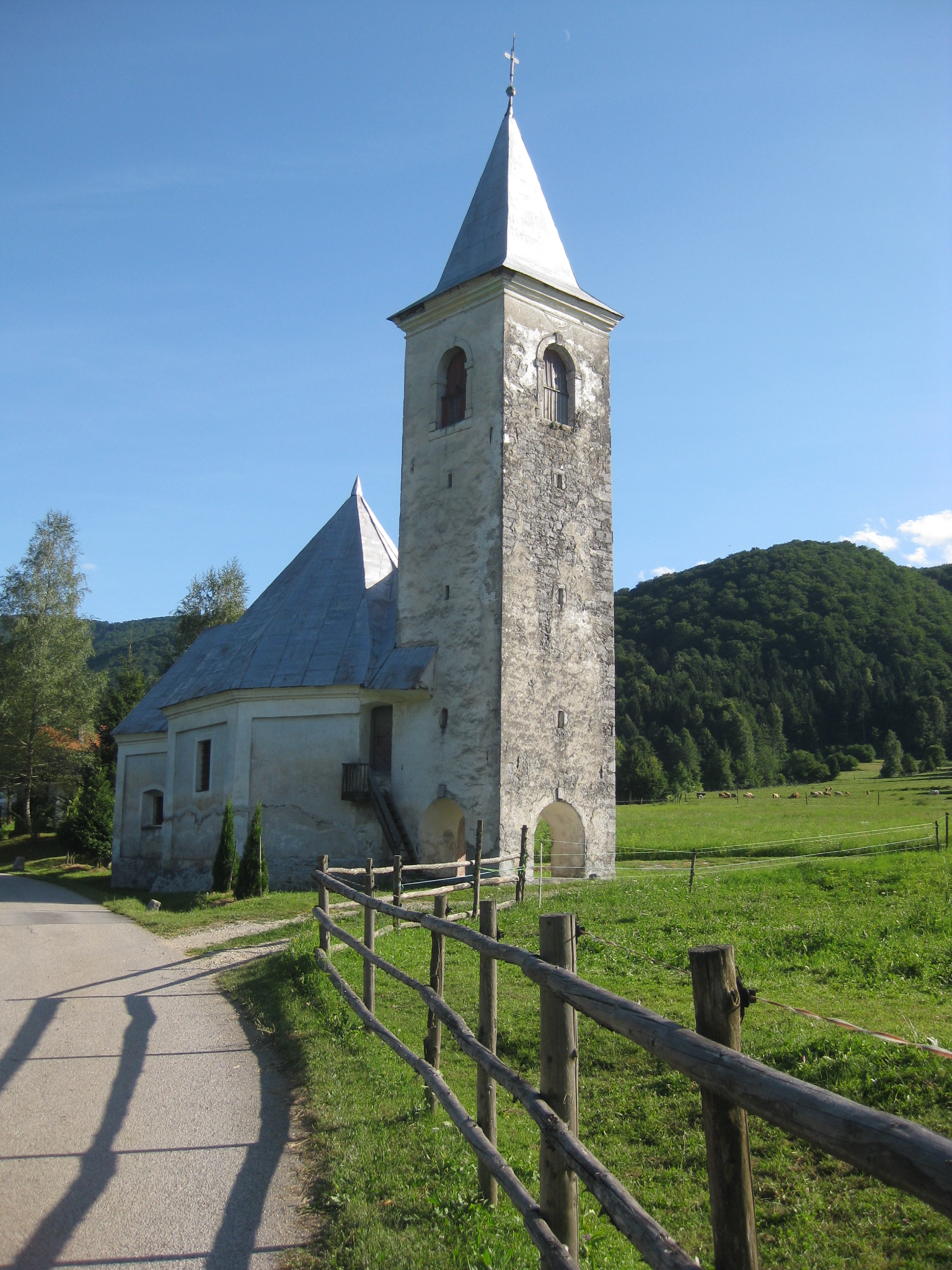

- Location in Slovenia
- Coordinates: 45°39′50.9″N 15°6′29.41″E
- Country: Slovenia
- Traditional region: Lower Carniola
- Statistical region: Southeast Slovenia
- Municipality: Semič

Area
  - Total: 5.89 km^{2} (2.27 sq mi)
- Elevation: 446 m (1,463 ft)

Population (2002)
  - Total: 57

Srednja Vas (pronounced [ˈsɾeːdnja ˈʋaːs]; Slovene: Srednja vas, German: Mitterdorf) is a village in the Municipality of Semič in Slovenia. The area is part of the historical region of Lower Carniola. The municipality is now included in the Southeast Slovenia Statistical Region.

The local church is dedicated to Saints Phillip and James and belongs to the Parish of Črmošnjice. It dates to the 18th century.
