= Krvavčji Vrh =

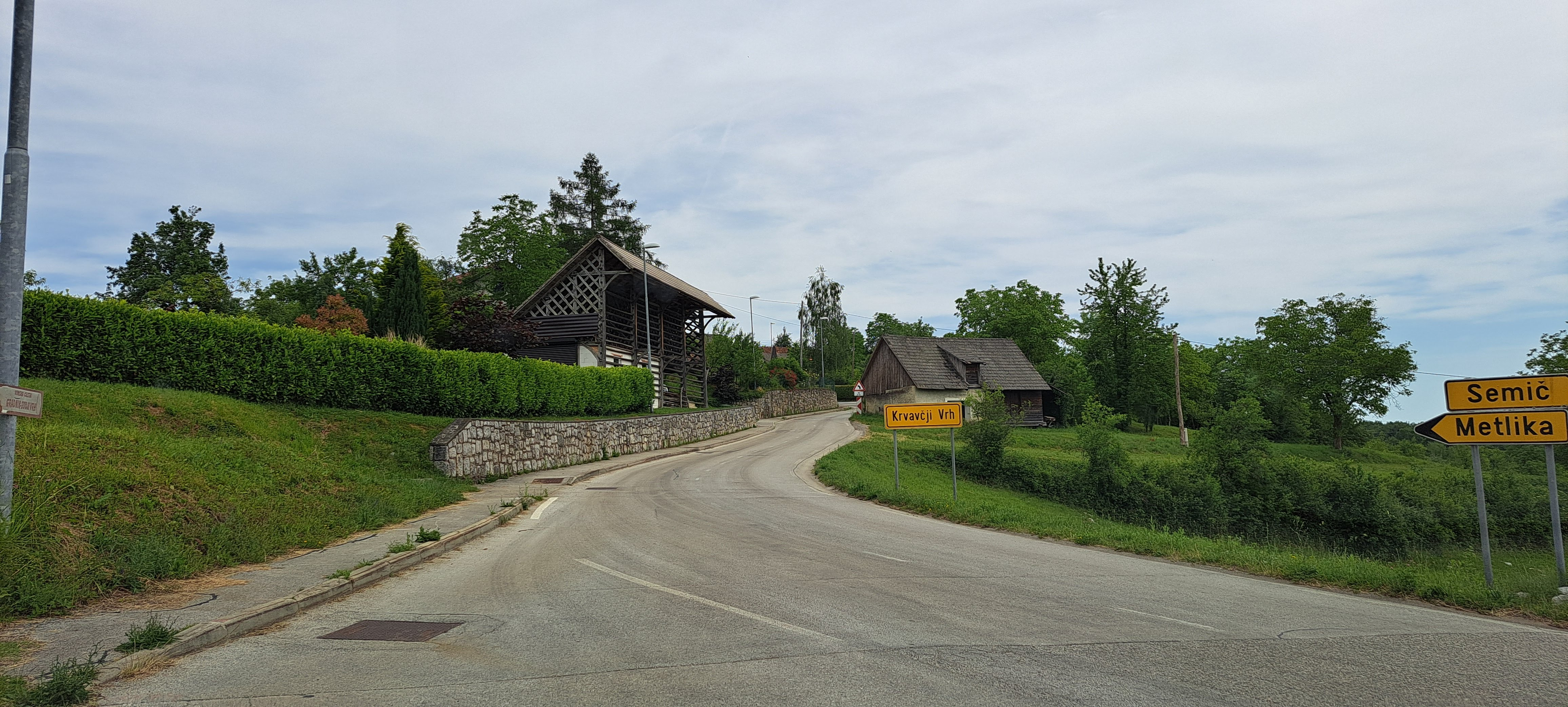

- Location in Slovenia
- Coordinates: 45°39′24.12″N 15°15′22.89″E
- Country: Slovenia
- Traditional region: Lower Carniola
- Statistical region: Southeast Slovenia
- Municipality: Semič

Area
  - Total: 3.41 km^{2} (1.32 sq mi)
- Elevation: 229.6 m (753 ft)

Population (2002)
  - Total: 81

Krvavčji Vrh (pronounced [kəɾˈʋaːu̯tʃji ˈʋəɾx]; German: Blutsberg) is a village in the Municipality of Semič in Slovenia. It lies on the local road leading east out of Semič to Metlika. The area is part of the historical region of Lower Carniola. The municipality is now included in the Southeast Slovenia Statistical Region.

The local church is dedicated to Saint Florian and belongs to the Parish of Semič. It is a 16th-century building that was refurbished in the Baroque style in the 18th century.
