= Podreber, Semič =

Podreber
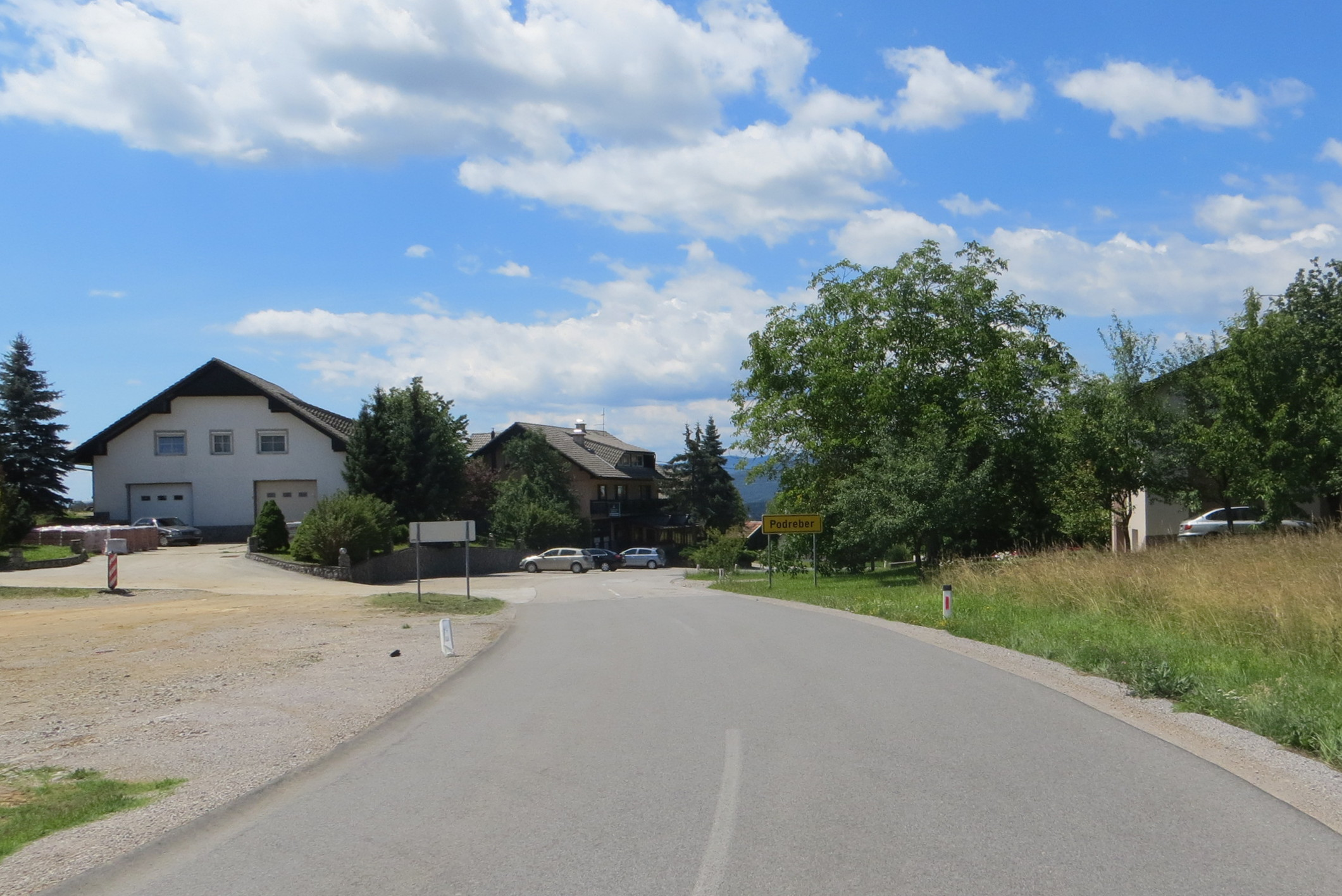

- Location in Slovenia
- Coordinates: 45°39′58.52″N 15°12′11.31″E
- Country: Slovenia
- Traditional region: Lower Carniola
- Statistical region: Southeast Slovenia
- Municipality: Semič

Area
  - Total: 1.05 km^{2} (0.41 sq mi)
- Elevation: 243.2 m (798 ft)

Population (2002)
  - Total: 56

Podreber (pronounced [pɔˈdɾeːbəɾ]) is a settlement in the Municipality of Semič in southeastern Slovenia. The area is part of the traditional region of Lower Carniola and is now included in the Southeast Slovenia Statistical Region.
