= Hrib pri Rožnem Dolu =

- Location in Slovenia
- Coordinates: 45°40′49.75″N 15°8′1.95″E
- Country: Slovenia
- Traditional region: Lower Carniola
- Statistical region: Southeast Slovenia
- Municipality: Semič

Area
  - Total: 0.98 km^{2} (0.38 sq mi)
- Elevation: 510.3 m (1,674 ft)

Hrib pri Rožnem Dolu (pronounced [ˈxɾiːp pɾi ˈɾoːʒnɛm ˈdoːlu]; German: Hrib bei Rosenthal) is a small settlement in the hills west of Rožni Dol in the Municipality of Semič in Slovenia. The area is part of the historical region of Lower Carniola. The municipality is now included in the Southeast Slovenia Statistical Region.

== Name ==
The name Hrib pri Rožnem Dolu means 'Hrib near Rožni Dol', distinguishing it from other settlements named Hrib. The name Hrib (from the common noun hrib 'hill') is common in Slovenia, referring to the local geography.
