= Starihov Vrh =

- Location in Slovenia
- Coordinates: 45°37′49.45″N 15°10′24.65″E
- Country: Slovenia
- Traditional region: Lower Carniola
- Statistical region: Southeast Slovenia
- Municipality: Semič

Area
  - Total: 0.86 km^{2} (0.33 sq mi)
- Elevation: 234.6 m (770 ft)

Population (2002)
  - Total: 16

Starihov Vrh (pronounced [staˈɾiːxɔu̯ ˈʋəɾx]; German: Starichaberg) is a settlement south of Semič in southeastern Slovenia. The area is part of the historical region of Lower Carniola. The Municipality of Semič is now included in the Southeast Slovenia Statistical Region.

== Church ==
The local church, built on a hill with a cemetery east of the settlement, is dedicated to Saint Roch (Slovene: sveti Rok) and belongs to the Parish of Semič. It dates to the 17th century and was mentioned by Johann Weikhard von Valvasor in his Glory of the Duchy of Carniola.
