= Brstovec =

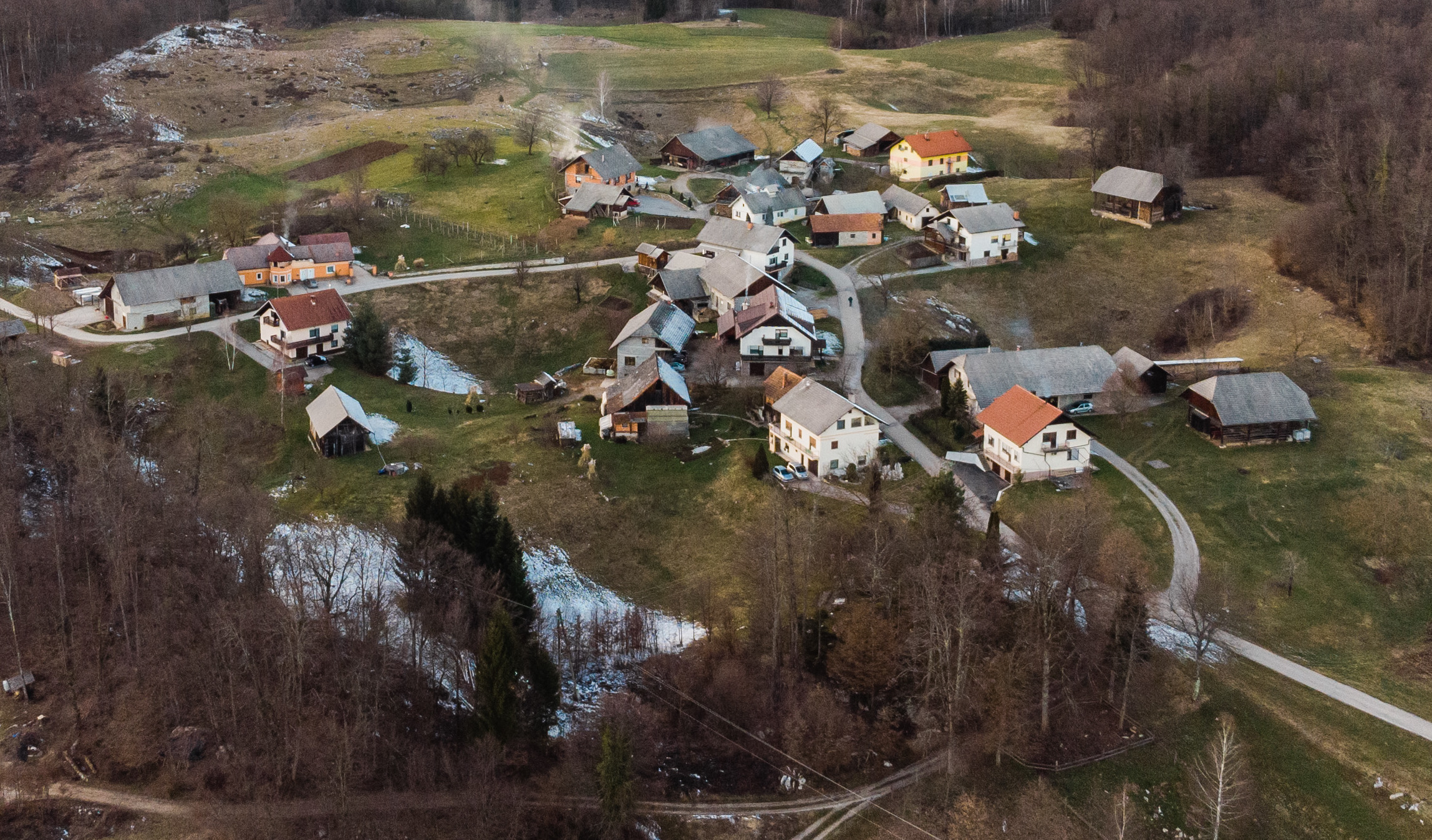

- Location in Slovenia
- Coordinates: 45°37′53.85″N 15°11′47.77″E
- Country: Slovenia
- Traditional region: Lower Carniola
- Statistical region: Southeast Slovenia
- Municipality: Semič

Area
  - Total: 0.37 km^{2} (0.14 sq mi)
- Elevation: 208.7 m (685 ft)

Population (2002)
  - Total: 38

Brstovec (pronounced [bəɾˈstɔːʋəts]; German: Werstouz) is a settlement in the Municipality of Semič in Slovenia. It lies south of Semič in the historical region of Lower Carniola. The municipality is now included in the Southeast Slovenia Statistical Region.
