= Stranska Vas pri Semiču =

- Location in Slovenia
- Coordinates: 45°37′53.38″N 15°13′9.04″E
- Country: Slovenia
- Traditional region: Lower Carniola
- Statistical region: Southeast Slovenia
- Municipality: Semič

Area
  - Total: 3.23 km^{2} (1.25 sq mi)
- Elevation: 163.9 m (538 ft)

Population (2002)
  - Total: 65

Stranska Vas pri Semiču (pronounced [ˈstɾaːnska ˈʋaːs pɾi ˈseːmitʃu]; Slovene: Stranska vas pri Semiču, German: Seitendorf) is a village on the right bank of the Krupa River in the Municipality of Semič in Slovenia. The area is part of the historical region of Lower Carniola. The municipality is now included in the Southeast Slovenia Statistical Region.

== Name ==
The name of the settlement was changed from Stranska vas to Stranska vas pri Semiču in 1955. In the past the German name was Seitendorf.

== Krupa Castle ==
Stranska Vas pri Semiču was the location of Krupa Castle. The castle was mentioned in written documents dating to the 15th century, expanded in the 16th and 18th centuries, and burned down during the Second World War in 1942 by the Partisans.
