= Vinji Vrh pri Semiču =

- Village
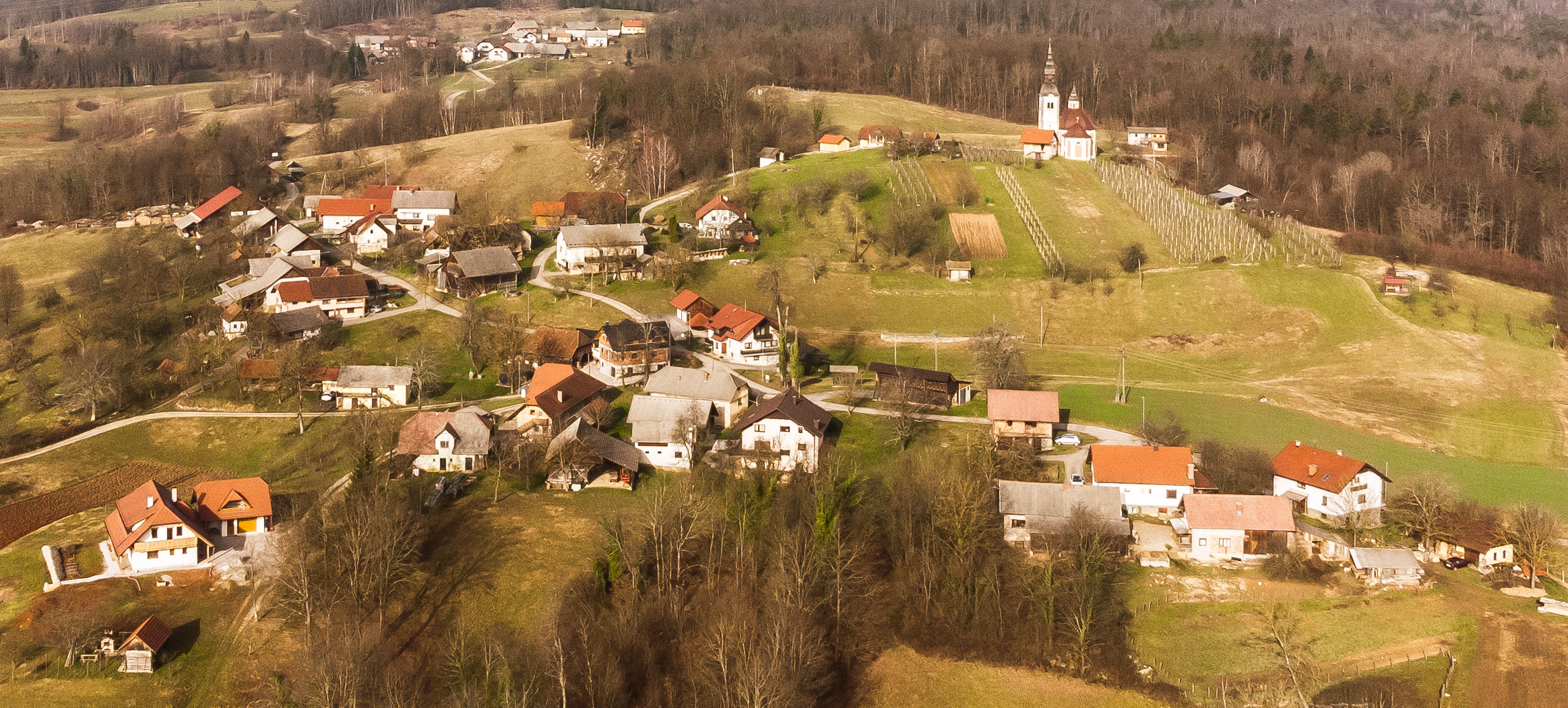

- Location in Slovenia
- Coordinates: 45°37′45.69″N 15°12′23.3″E
- Country: Slovenia
- Traditional region: Lower Carniola
- Statistical region: Southeast Slovenia
- Municipality: Semič

Area
  - Total: 2.32 km^{2} (0.90 sq mi)
- Elevation: 207.1 m (679 ft)

Population (2002)
  - Total: 47

Vinji Vrh pri Semiču (pronounced [ˈʋiːnji ˈʋəɾx pɾi ˈseːmitʃu]; German: Weinberg) is a village in the Municipality of Semič in southeastern Slovenia. The area is part of the historical region of Lower Carniola. The municipality is now included in the Southeast Slovenia Statistical Region.

== Name ==
The name of the settlement was changed from Vinji Vrh to Vinji Vrh pri Semiču in 1955. In the past the German name was Weinberg.

== Church ==
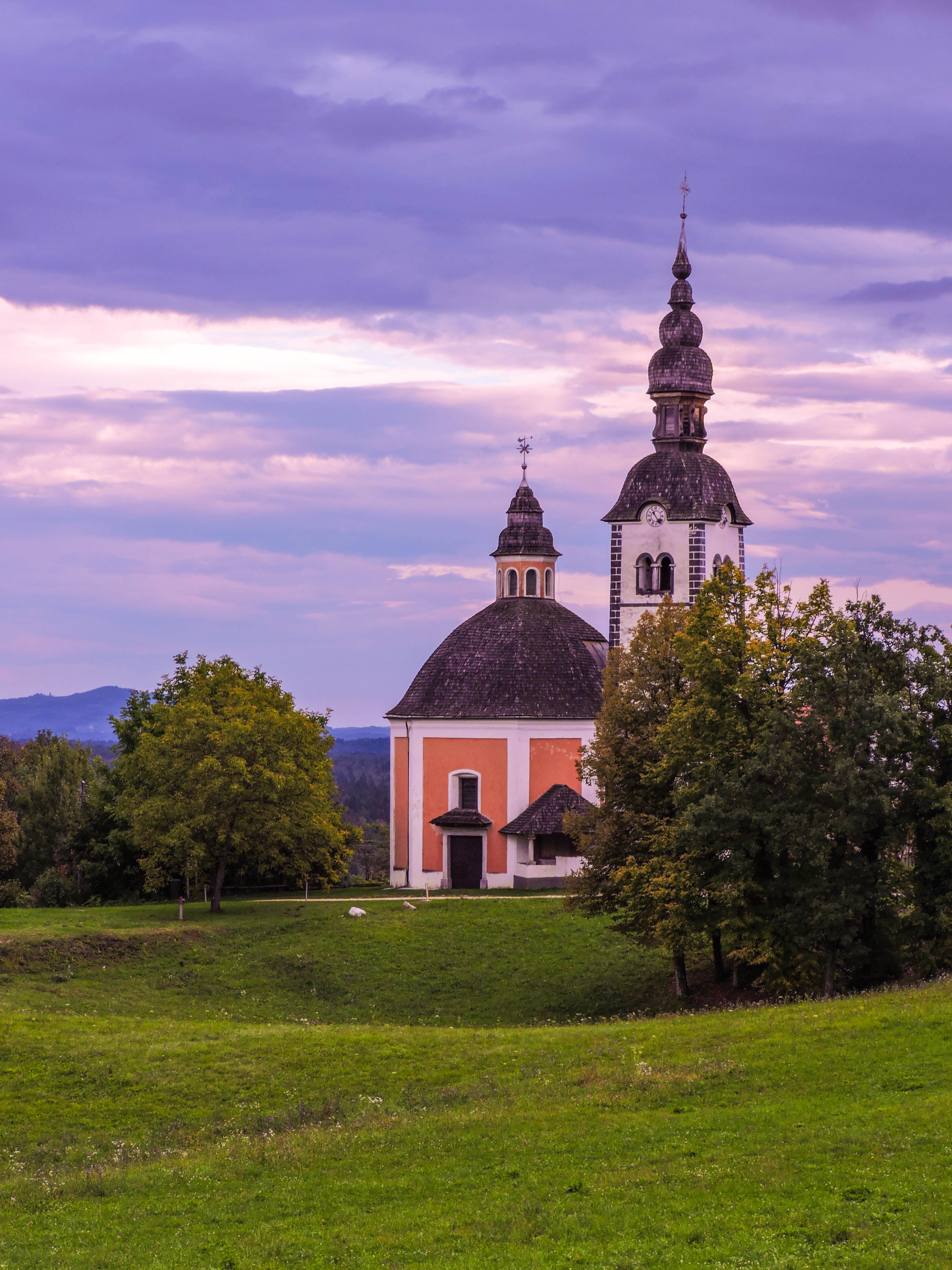
Holy Trinity Church

The local church is dedicated to the Holy Trinity and belongs to the Parish of Semič. It dates to the mid-17th century.
