= Praprot =

- Location in Slovenia
- Coordinates: 45°38′17.72″N 15°12′44.66″E
- Country: Slovenia
- Traditional region: Lower Carniola
- Statistical region: Southeast Slovenia
- Municipality: Semič

Area
  - Total: 0.85 km^{2} (0.33 sq mi)
- Elevation: 172.9 m (567 ft)

Population (2002)
  - Total: 53

Praprot (pronounced [ˈpraːpɾɔt]) is a small village southeast of Semič in southeast Slovenia. The area is part of the historical region of Lower Carniola. The municipality is now included in the Southeast Slovenia Statistical Region.
