= Krupa (Lahinja) =

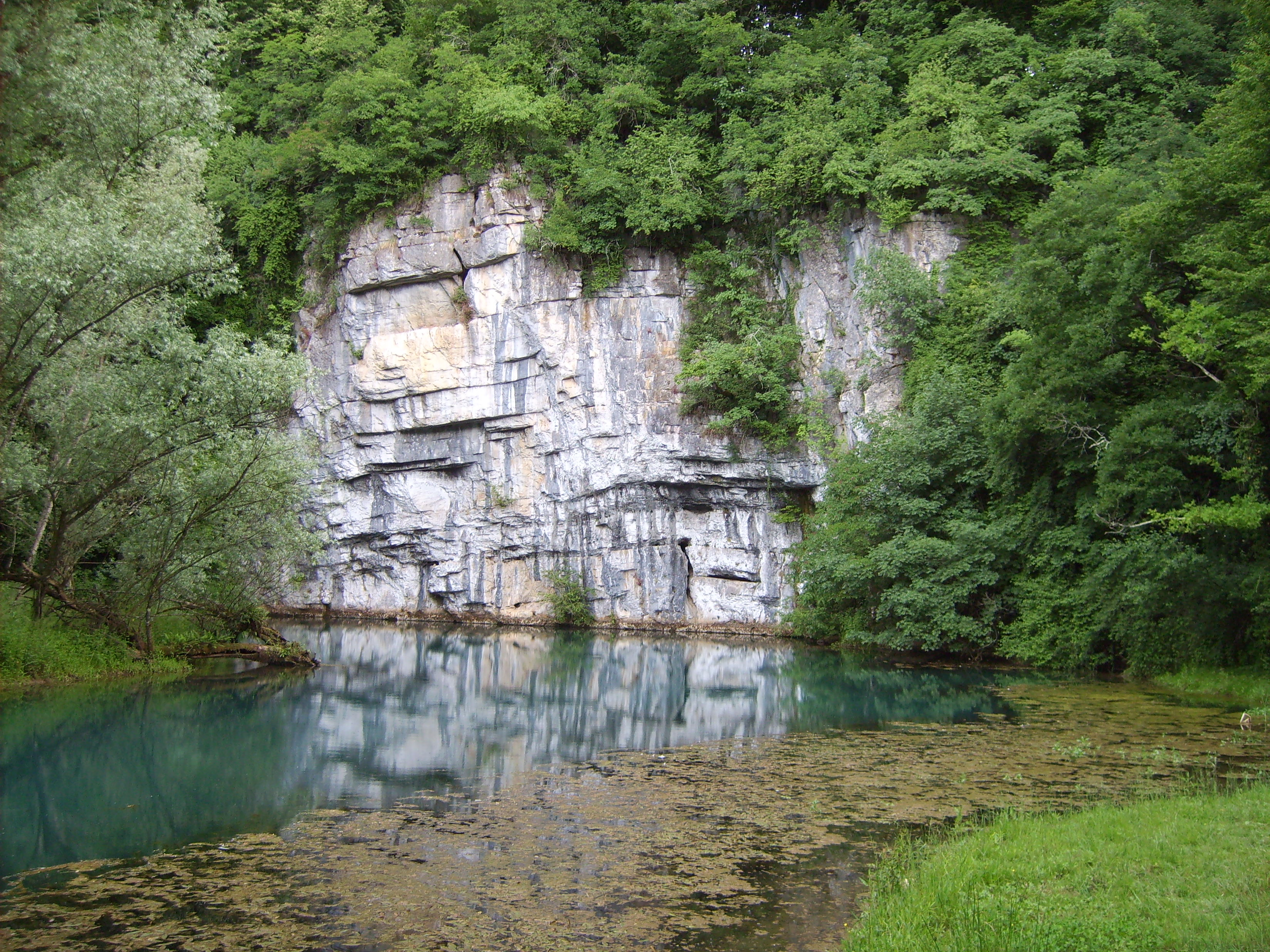
- Source of the Krupa River

Location
- Country: Slovenia

Physical characteristics
- Source
  - coordinates: 45°38′1″N 15°13′4″E
- Mouth
  - location: Lahinja
  - coordinates: 45.6245°N 15.2395°E

Basin features
- Progression: Lahinja→ Kupa→ Sava→ Danube→ Black Sea

The Krupa is a 2.5 km (1.6 mi) river in White Carniola, southeastern Slovenia. Its source is a karst spring in the village of Krupa below a rock wall. The bed has canyon characteristics in some places. At Gradac, the river joins the Lahinja from the left side. Its drop from the source to the outflow is only 6 metres (20 ft).

The river is protected as a natural monument and has been included in the Natura 2000 ecological network. It is the main feature of the Lebica–Krupa Karst Nature Trail (Slovene: Kraška učna pot od Lebice do Krupe). Its source lake is the only habitat of the cave mollusk Congeria kusceri in Slovenia, found in Cave Mussel Spring (Izvir Jamske školjke). It is also home to some cave snails and the olm.

The Krupa River is infamous because of its extremely high pollution with PCBs due to improper handling of PCB waste material, which has been used for decades by the capacitor manufacturing company Iskra Kondenzatorji in nearby Semič.
