= Brezje pri Vinjem Vrhu =

- Location in Slovenia
- Coordinates: 45°37′52.28″N 15°11′15.45″E
- Country: Slovenia
- Traditional region: Lower Carniola
- Statistical region: Southeast Slovenia
- Municipality: Semič

Area
  - Total: 0.78 km^{2} (0.30 sq mi)
- Elevation: 215 m (705 ft)

Population (2002)
  - Total: 20

Brezje pri Vinjem Vrhu (pronounced [ˈbɾeːzjɛ pɾi ˈʋiːnjɛɱ ˈʋəɾxu]; German: Bresie) is a settlement in the hills south of Semič in southeastern Slovenia. The area is part of the historical region of Lower Carniola. The Municipality of Semič is now included in the Southeast Slovenia Statistical Region.

== Name ==
Brezje pri Vinjem Vrhu was attested in written sources as Bresia in 1490. The name Brezje literally means 'birch woods', derived from the common noun breza 'birch'. Like similar toponyms in Slovenia (e.g., Brezova, Brezovec, Brezovci), it originally referred to the local vegetation.

== Cultural heritage ==
A Bronze Age settlement was identified in the area in a 1986 archaeological field survey.
