= Hrib pri Cerovcu =

- Location in Slovenia
- Coordinates: 45°39′35.56″N 15°14′35.36″E
- Country: Slovenia
- Traditional region: Lower Carniola
- Statistical region: Southeast Slovenia
- Municipality: Semič

Area
  - Total: 0.65 km^{2} (0.25 sq mi)
- Elevation: 267.1 m (876 ft)

Population (2002)
  - Total: 13

Hrib pri Cerovcu (pronounced [ˈxɾiːp pri tsɛˈɾoːu̯tsu]; German: Hrib bei Zerouz) is a small settlement in the Municipality of Semič in Slovenia. It lies just north of Cerovec pri Črešnjevcu. The area is part of the historical region of Lower Carniola. The municipality is now included in the Southeast Slovenia Statistical Region.
