= Oskoršnica =

- Location in Slovenia
- Coordinates: 45°39′36.16″N 15°12′16.78″E
- Country: Slovenia
- Traditional region: Lower Carniola
- Statistical region: Southeast Slovenia
- Municipality: Semič

Area
  - Total: 1.08 km^{2} (0.42 sq mi)
- Elevation: 229.5 m (753 ft)

Population (2002)
  - Total: 78

Oskoršnica (pronounced [ɔˈskoːɾʃnitsa]) is a settlement in the Municipality of Semič in southeastern Slovenia. The municipality is included in the Southeast Slovenia Statistical Region. The entire area is part of the historical region of Lower Carniola.
