= Gradnik =

- Location in Slovenia
- Coordinates: 45°40′16.39″N 15°14′31.84″E
- Country: Slovenia
- Traditional region: Lower Carniola
- Statistical region: Southeast Slovenia
- Municipality: Semič

Area
  - Total: 2.05 km^{2} (0.79 sq mi)
- Elevation: 295.4 m (969 ft)

Population (2002)
  - Total: 68

Gradnik (pronounced [ˈɡɾaːdnik]) is a village in the Municipality of Semič in Slovenia. The area is part of the historical region of Lower Carniola. The municipality is now included in the Southeast Slovenia Statistical Region.

== Mass grave ==
Gradnik is the site of a mass grave from the Second World War. The Pintarca Mass Grave (Slovene: Grobišče Pintarca) is located on the southwest slope of a large sinkhole about 700 meters (2,300 ft) east of Omota. It contains the remains of four to six people killed by the Partisans in October 1943.

== Church ==
The local church is dedicated to Saint Nicholas and belongs to Parish of Semič. It was first mentioned in written documents dating to 1523 and was restyled in the Baroque in the 18th century.
