= Štrekljevec =

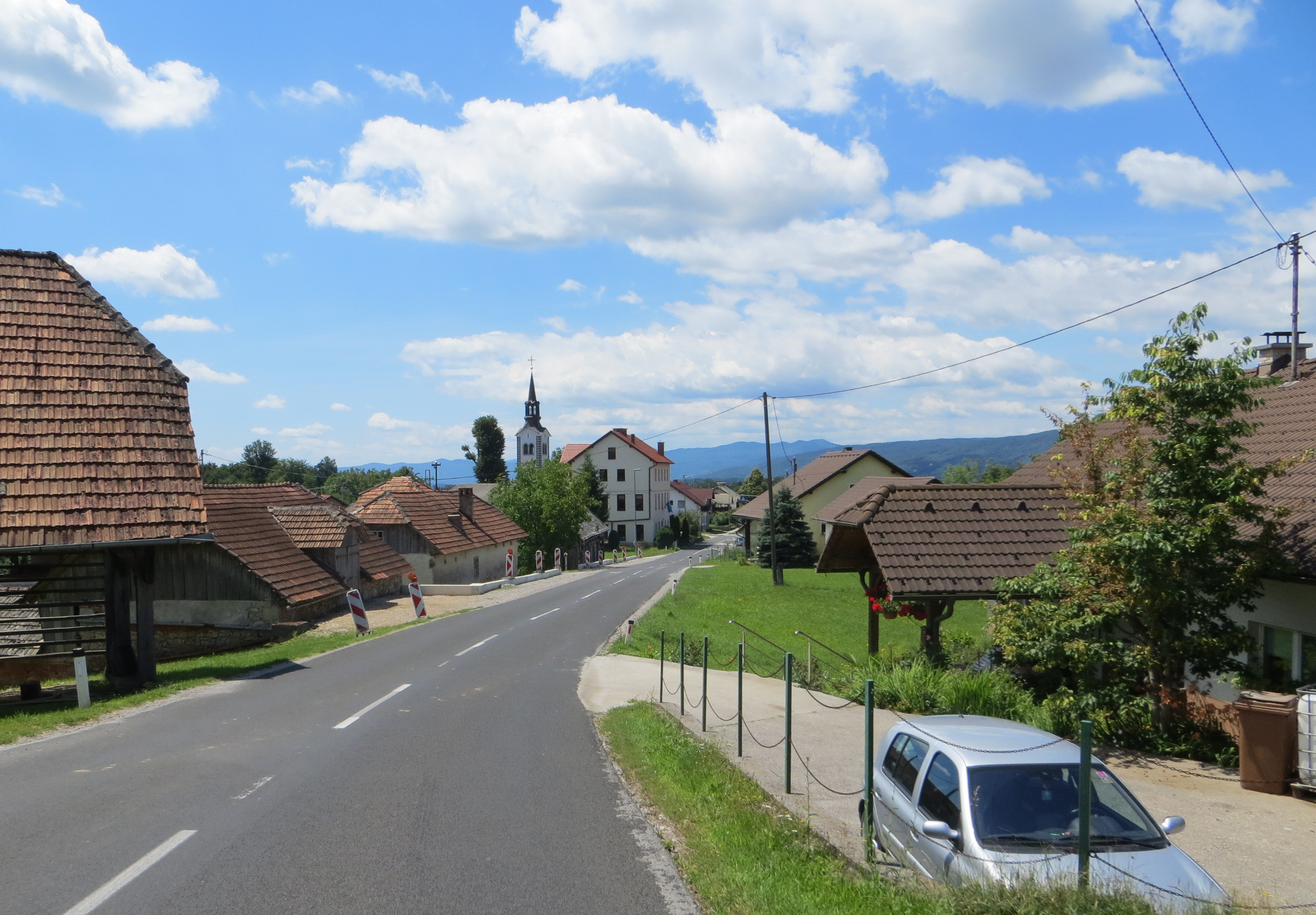

- Location in Slovenia
- Coordinates: 45°40′13.98″N 15°13′3.12″E
- Country: Slovenia
- Traditional region: Lower Carniola
- Statistical region: Southeast Slovenia
- Municipality: Semič

Area
  - Total: 1.36 km^{2} (0.53 sq mi)
- Elevation: 269.1 m (883 ft)

Population (2002)
  - Total: 95

Štrekljevec (pronounced [ˈʃtɾeːkljɛʋəts]; German: Streklowitz) is a village in the Municipality of Semič in Slovenia. The area is part of the historical region of Lower Carniola. The municipality is now included in the Southeast Slovenia Statistical Region.

The local church is dedicated to the Assumption of Mary and belongs to the Parish of Semič. It is a Baroque building dating to the second half of the 18th century.
