= Črmošnjice, Semič =

Črmošnjice
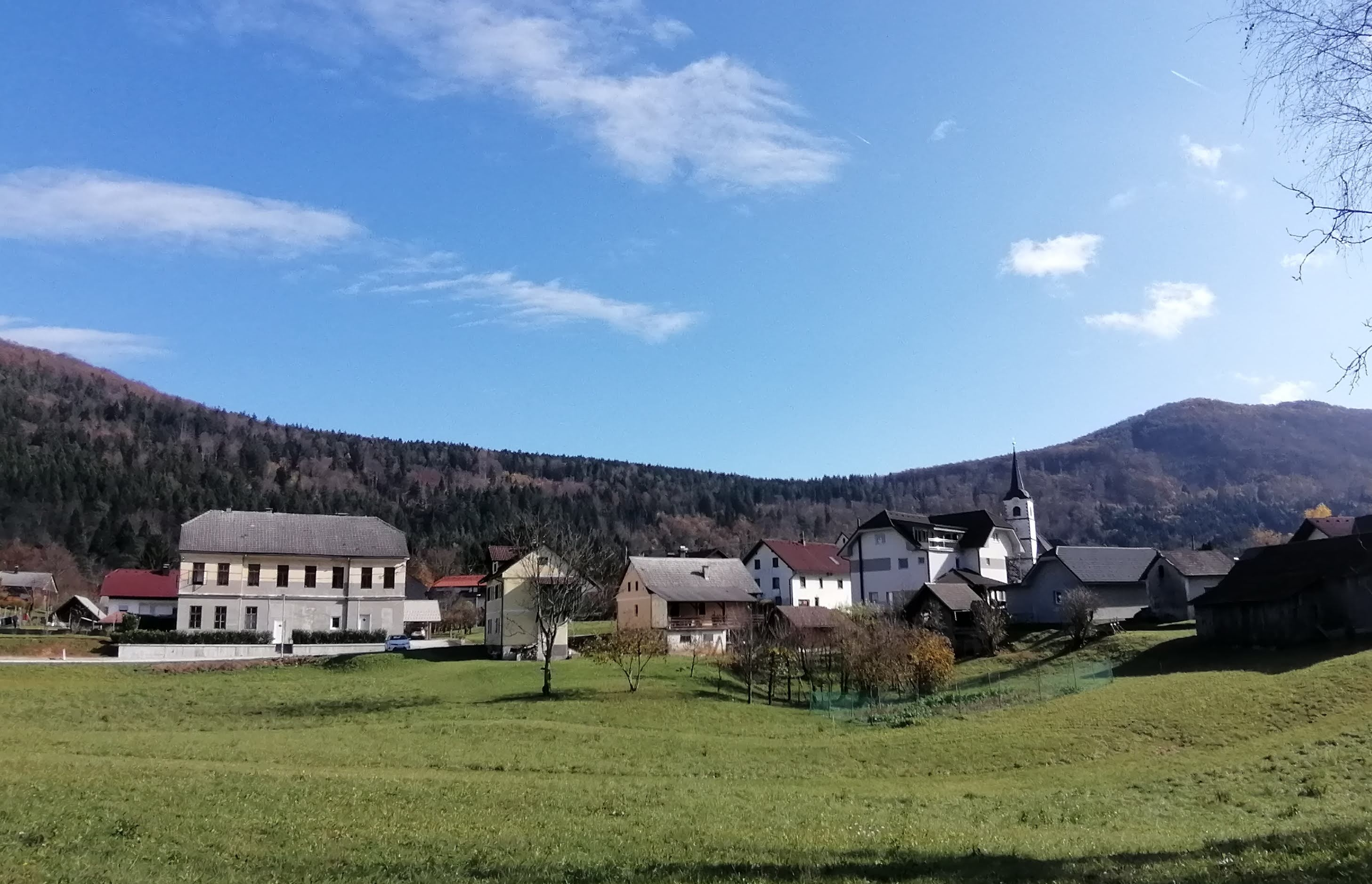

- Location in Slovenia
- Coordinates: 45°40′22.01″N 15°6′8.67″E
- Country: Slovenia
- Traditional region: Lower Carniola
- Statistical region: Southeast Slovenia
- Municipality: Semič

Area
  - Total: 6.9 km^{2} (2.7 sq mi)
- Elevation: 410.5 m (1,347 ft)

Population (2002)
  - Total: 125

Črmošnjice (pronounced [tʃəɾmɔˈʃnjìːtsɛ, -njíː-]; German: Tschermoschnitz) is a village in the Municipality of Semič in Slovenia. It lies on the eastern edge of the Gottschee region that used to be inhabited by Gottschee Germans expelled in 1941 during the Second World War. The area is part of the historical region of Lower Carniola. The municipality is now included in the Southeast Slovenia Statistical Region.

== Name ==
Črmošnjice was first attested in 1264 as Scherczenicz (and as Zcermesniza in 1295, Tschermoznicz in 1353, and Tschermoschnitz in 1421). The name is derived from archaic Slovene čremoš, čremož 'ramsons' (today čemaž in Slovene) and thus refers to the local vegetation. The name of the town also appears in the clipped forms Maschen in 1614 and Moschen in 1754. In the past the German name was Tschermoschnitz.

== Church ==
The local parish church is dedicated to the Assumption of Mary and belongs to Roman Catholic Diocese of Novo Mesto. It dates to the 16th century.
