= Vimolj pri Predgradu =

- Location in Slovenia
- Coordinates: 45°32′29.53″N 15°2′26.52″E
- Country: Slovenia
- Traditional region: Lower Carniola
- Statistical region: Southeast Slovenia
- Municipality: Kočevje

Area
  - Total: 0.46 km^{2} (0.18 sq mi)
- Elevation: 467.5 m (1,534 ft)

Population (2002)
  - Total: 14
- Postal code: 8342

Vimolj pri Predgradu (pronounced [ˈʋiːmɔl pɾi ˈpɾéːdɡɾadu]; German: Widerzug) is a small settlement in the Municipality of Kočevje in southern Slovenia. The area is part of the traditional region of Lower Carniola and is now included in the Southeast Slovenia Statistical Region.

== Name ==
The name of the settlement was changed from Vimolj to Vimolj pri Predgradu in 1953.
