= Rožni Dol =

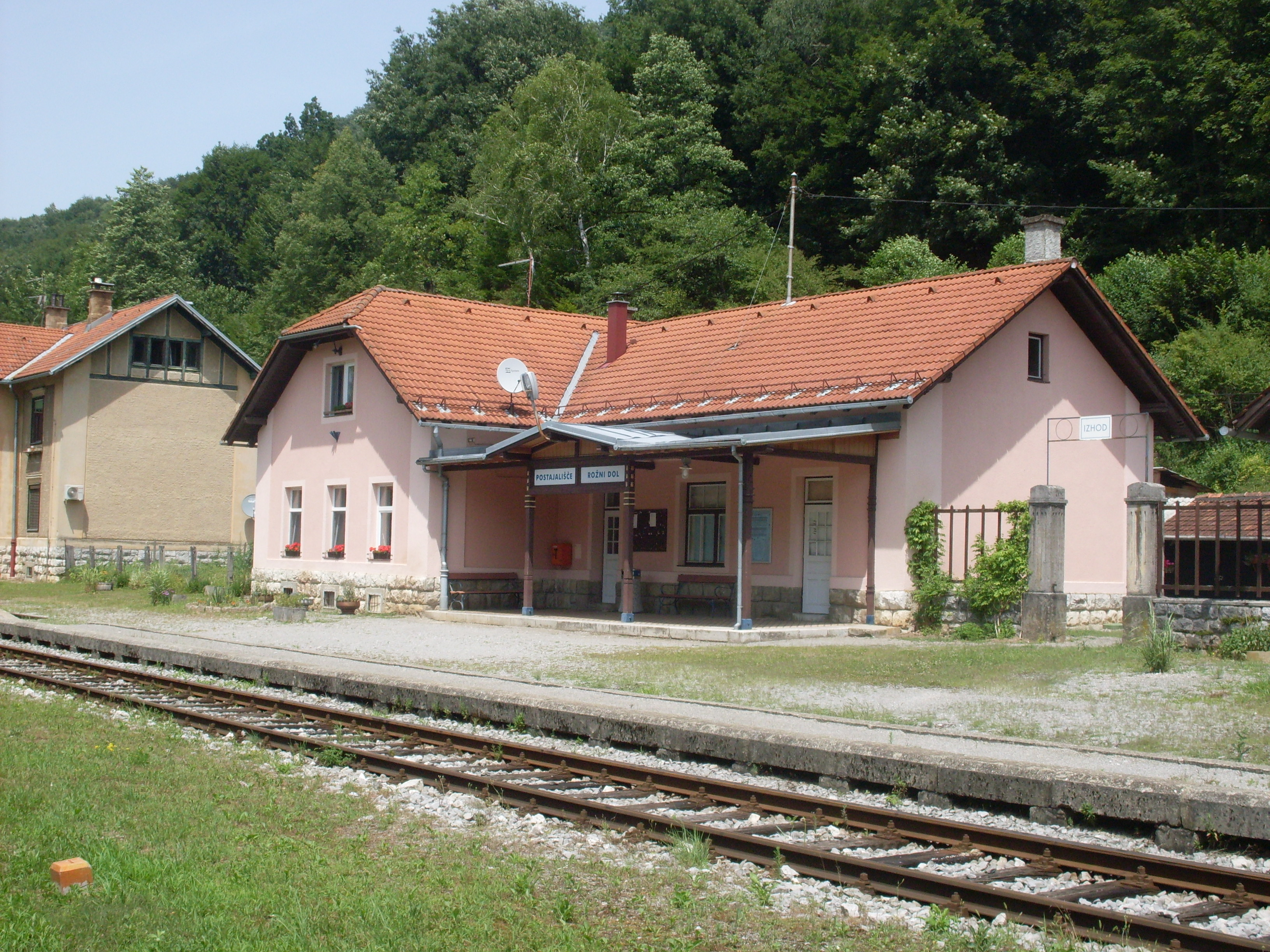
- A railway halt in Rožni Dol

- Location in Slovenia
- Coordinates: 45°40′44.53″N 15°8′37.06″E
- Country: Slovenia
- Traditional region: Lower Carniola
- Statistical region: Southeast Slovenia
- Municipality: Semič

Area
  - Total: 2.45 km^{2} (0.95 sq mi)
- Elevation: 338 m (1,109 ft)

Population (2002)
  - Total: 67

Rožni Dol (pronounced [ˈɾoːʒni ˈdoːu̯]; German: Rosenthal) is a village in the Municipality of Semič in Slovenia. The area is part of the historical region of Lower Carniola. The municipality is now included in the Southeast Slovenia Statistical Region.

The local church is dedicated to Mary Magdalene and belongs to the Parish of Semič. It was first mentioned in written documents dating to 1526, but was extensively rebuilt in the Baroque style in the mid 18th century.
