= Lahinja =

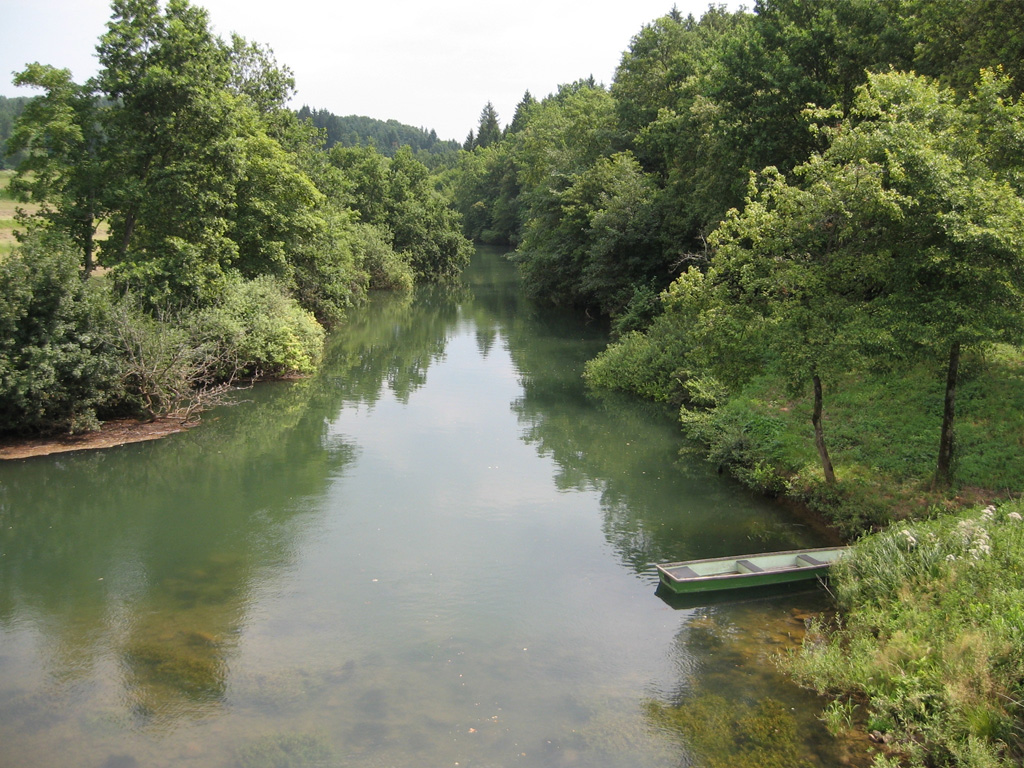
- Lahinja, 2006

Location
- Country: Slovenia

Physical characteristics
- Source
  - elevation: 150 m (490 ft)
- Mouth
  - location: Kupa (Kolpa)
  - coordinates: 45.6287°N 15.3010°E
  - elevation: 130 m (430 ft)
- Length: 34 km (21 mi)
- Basin size: 360 km^{2} (140 sq mi)

Basin features
- Progression: Kupa→ Sava→ Danube→ Black Sea

The Lahinja is a river in White Carniola, the extreme southeastern part of Slovenia. It is 34 kilometres (21 mi) long and originates from several karst springs at the end of a steephead valley between the villages of Knežina, Belčji Vrh, and Mali Nerajec.

In its upper course the river flows towards the north in a narrow bed with a very shallow gradient, resulting in significant meandering. All of its major affluents join it from the west and all of them start from karst springs. At Dragatuš it is joined by its major tributary Podturnščica Creek, and at Črnomelj by Dobličica Creek. From the outflow of Podturnščica Creek the bed of the Lahinja is narrow and up to 20 m deep, with numerous bends. At the vicinity of one of them stands Gradac Castle. From Črnomelj to Gradac the river has no surface affluents, but below Gradac it is joined by the high-volume and faster-flowing Krupa. After its confluence with the Krupa, the Lahinja turns towards the east. It joins the Kolpa at Primostek.

The Lahinja's river basin is asymmetric because it receives the majority of its surface affluents from the right side. It is a part of the Sava Basin. The Lahinja Regional Park extends from Knežina to Pusti Gradec, along the first seven km (4.5 mi) of the Lahinja.
