= Municipality of Semič =

Municipality of Slovenia

Municipality of Semič Občina Semič
- Municipality
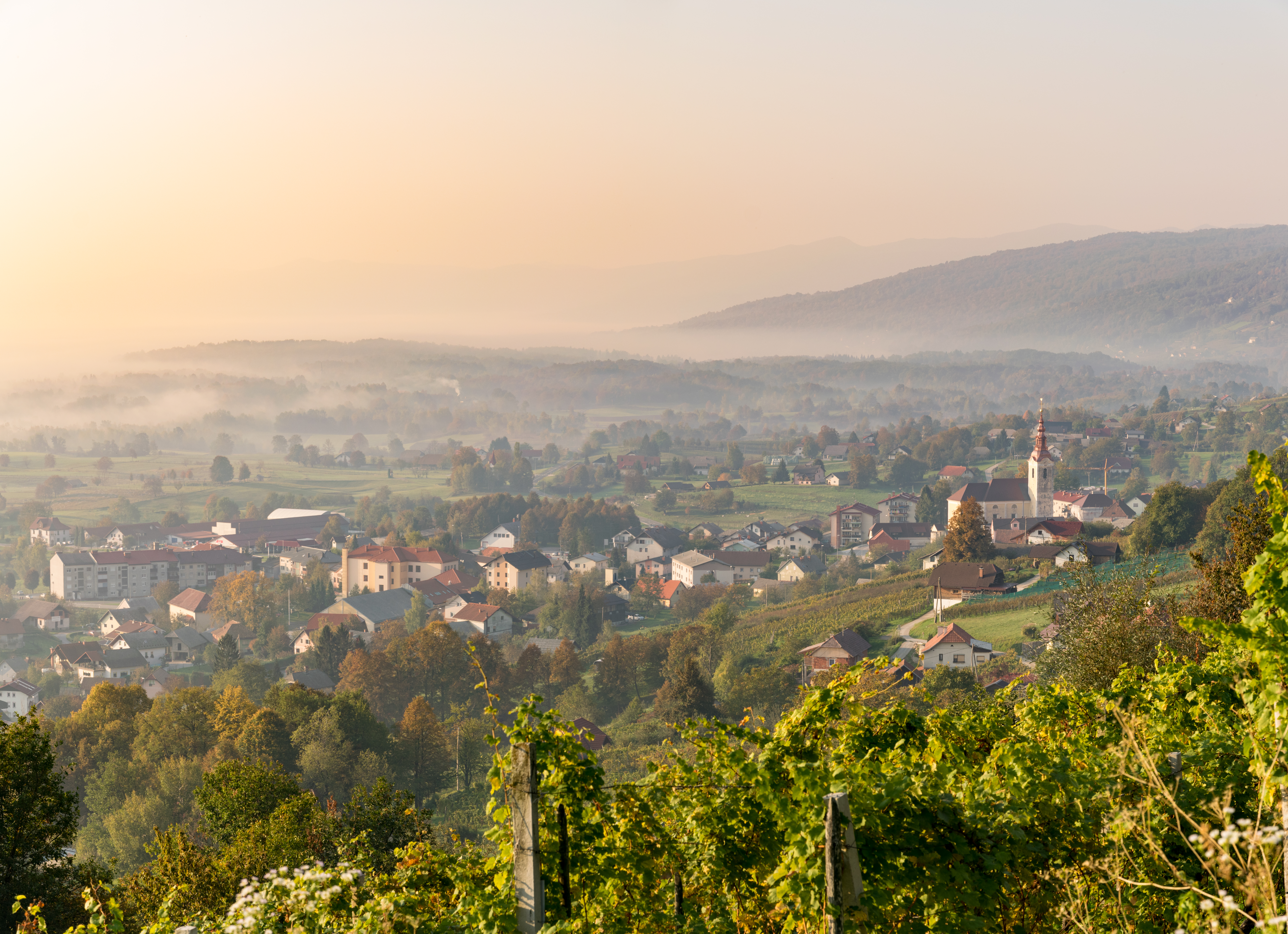

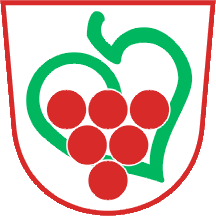
- Coat of arms

- Location of the Municipality of Semič in Slovenia
- Coordinates: 45°39′16″N 15°10′42″E
- Country: Slovenia

Government
  - Mayor: Polona Kambič

Area
  - Total: 146.7 km^{2} (56.6 sq mi)

Population (2002)
  - Total: 3,710
  - Density: 25.3/km^{2} (65.5/sq mi)
- Time zone: UTC+01 (CET)
  - Summer (DST): UTC+02 (CEST)
- Website: www.semic.si

The Municipality of Semič (pronounced [ˈseːmitʃ]; Slovene: Občina Semič) is a municipality in the traditional region of White Carniola in southeastern Slovenia. The municipality is included in the Southeast Slovenia Statistical Region. Its seat is the settlement of Semič.

== Settlements ==
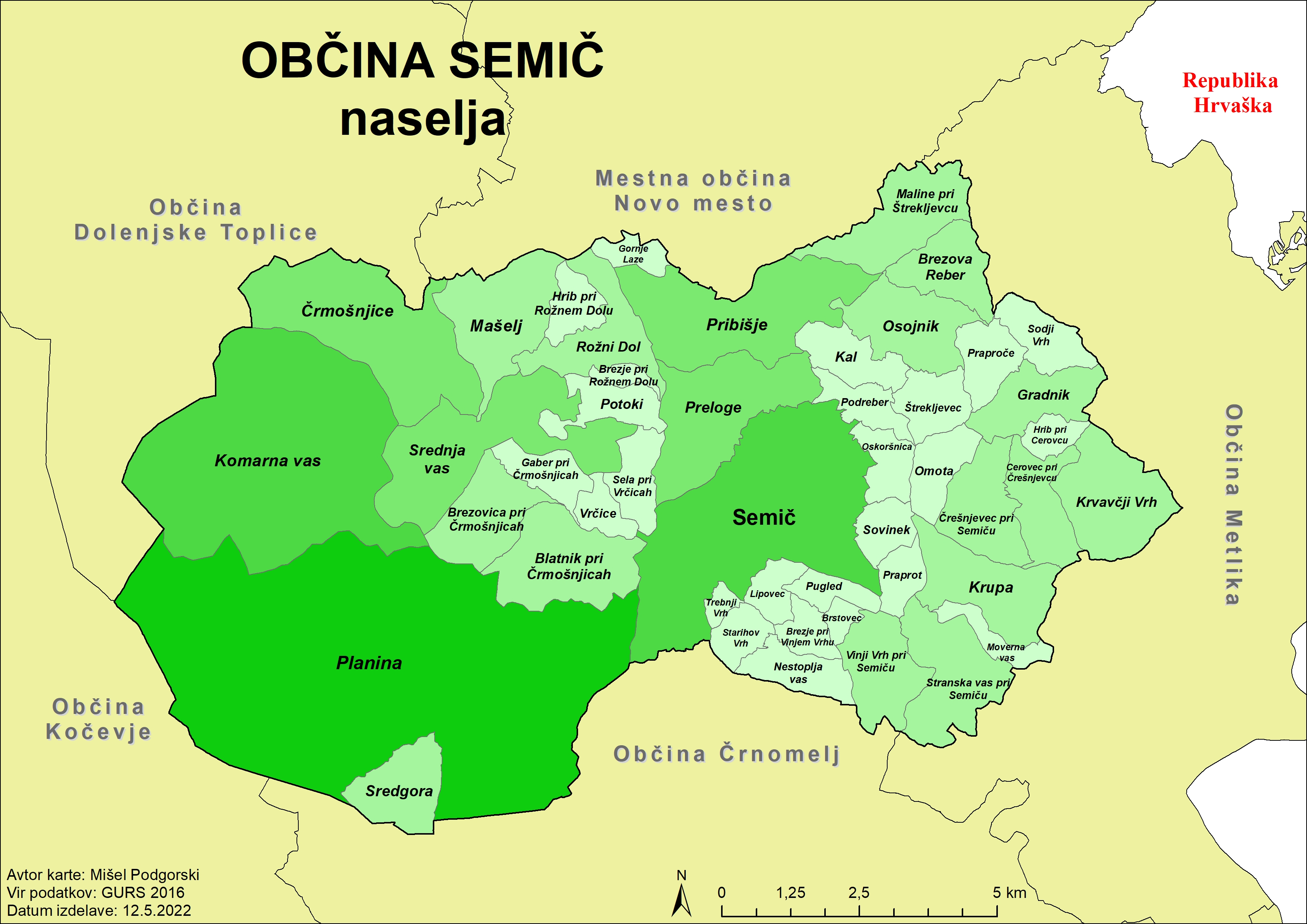

In addition to the municipal seat of Semič, the municipality also includes the following settlements:

- Blatnik pri Črmošnjicah
- Brezje pri Rožnem Dolu
- Brezje pri Vinjem Vrhu
- Brezova Reber
- Brezovica pri Črmošnjicah
- Brstovec
- Cerovec pri Črešnjevcu
- Črešnjevec pri Semiču
- Črmošnjice
- Gaber pri Črmošnjicah
- Gornje Laze
- Gradnik
- Hrib pri Cerovcu
- Hrib pri Rožnem Dolu
- Kal
- Komarna Vas
- Krupa
- Krvavčji Vrh
- Lipovec
- Maline pri Štrekljevcu
- Mašelj
- Moverna Vas
- Nestoplja Vas
- Omota
- Oskoršnica
- Osojnik
- Planina
- Podreber
- Potoki
- Praproče
- Praprot
- Preloge
- Pribišje
- Pugled
- Rožni Dol
- Sela pri Vrčicah
- Sodji Vrh
- Sovinek
- Sredgora
- Srednja Vas
- Starihov Vrh
- Stranska Vas pri Semiču
- Štrekljevec
- Trebnji Vrh
- Vinji Vrh pri Semiču
- Vrčice
