= Semič =

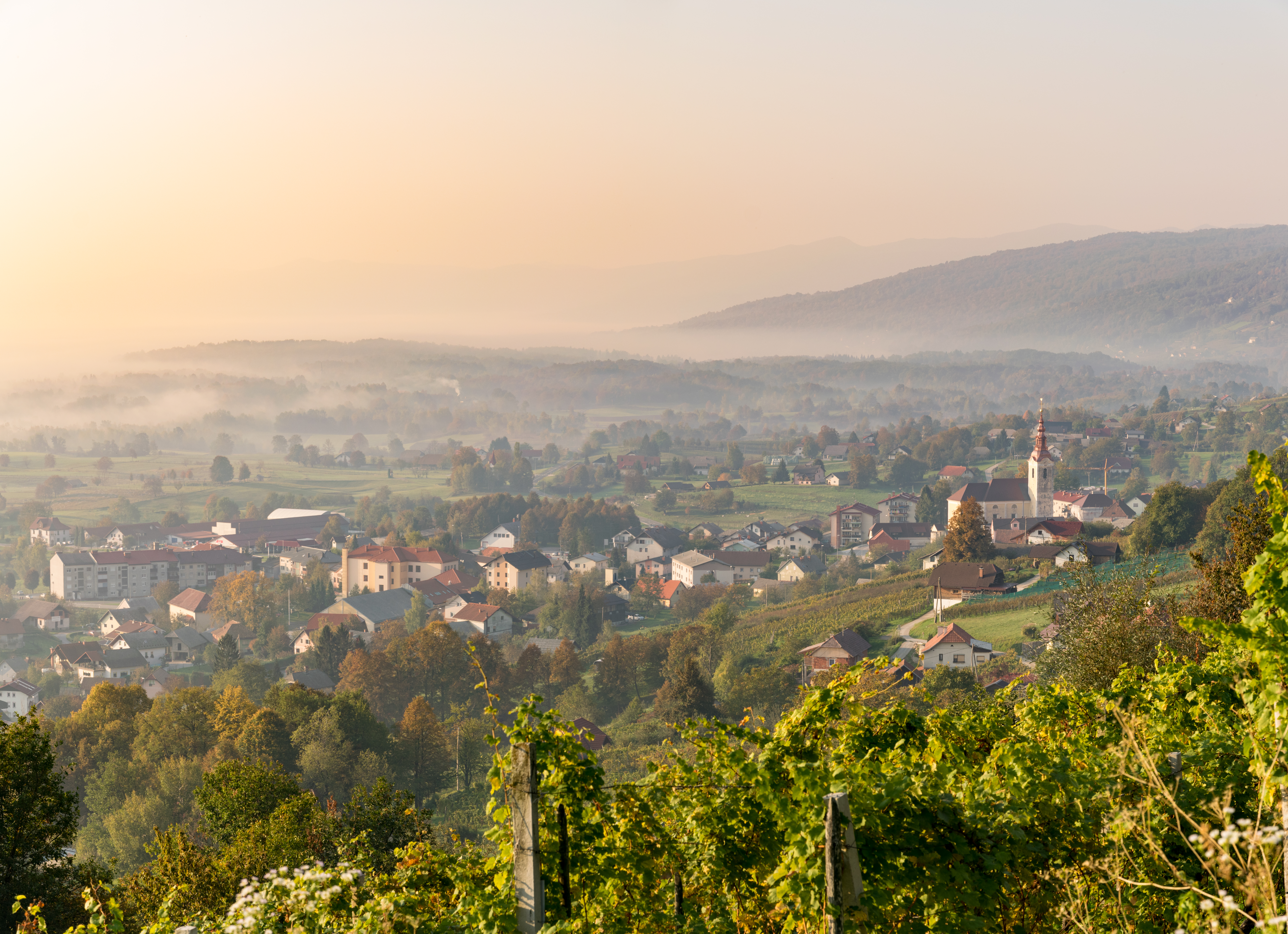

- Flag Coat of arms

- Location of Semič in Slovenia
- Coordinates: 45°39′16.56″N 15°10′42.01″E
- Country: Slovenia
- Traditional region: Lower Carniola
- Statistical region: Southeast Slovenia
- Municipality: Semič

Area
  - Total: 11.47 km^{2} (4.43 sq mi)
- Elevation: 318.5 m (1,045 ft)

Population (2012)
  - Total: 2,017
  - Density: 176/km^{2} (460/sq mi)
- Time zone: UTC+01 (CET)
  - Summer (DST): UTC+02 (CEST)
- Postal code: 8333 Semič

Semič (pronounced [ˈseːmitʃ]; German: Semitsch) is a settlement in southeastern Slovenia. It is the administrative seat of the Municipality of Semič.

== Geography ==
The settlement is located in the traditional region of White Carniola (Bela krajina, part of Lower Carniola) and the Southeast Slovenia Statistical Region. It lies between the Kočevje Rog Plateau and the Gorjanci Mountains to the northeast. The slopes of the Gorjanci Mountains are used for wine growing.

Semič is the site of an Iskra Kondenzatorji capacitor production plant, the largest employer in the region. In the 1980s the improper handling of PCB waste material led to serious pollution of nearby Krupa Creek and caused a major environmental scandal.

=== Hamlets ===
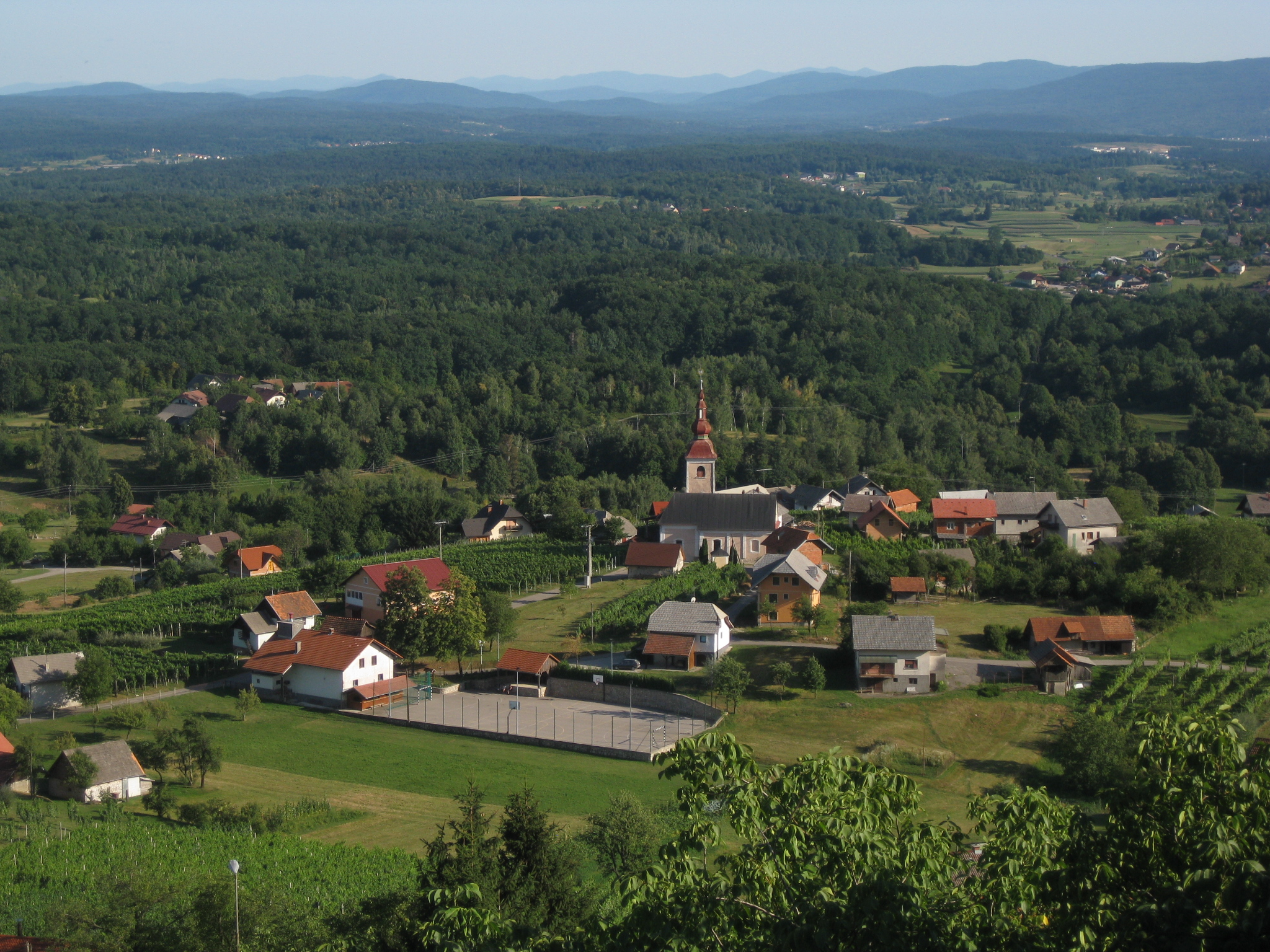
Sadinja Vas

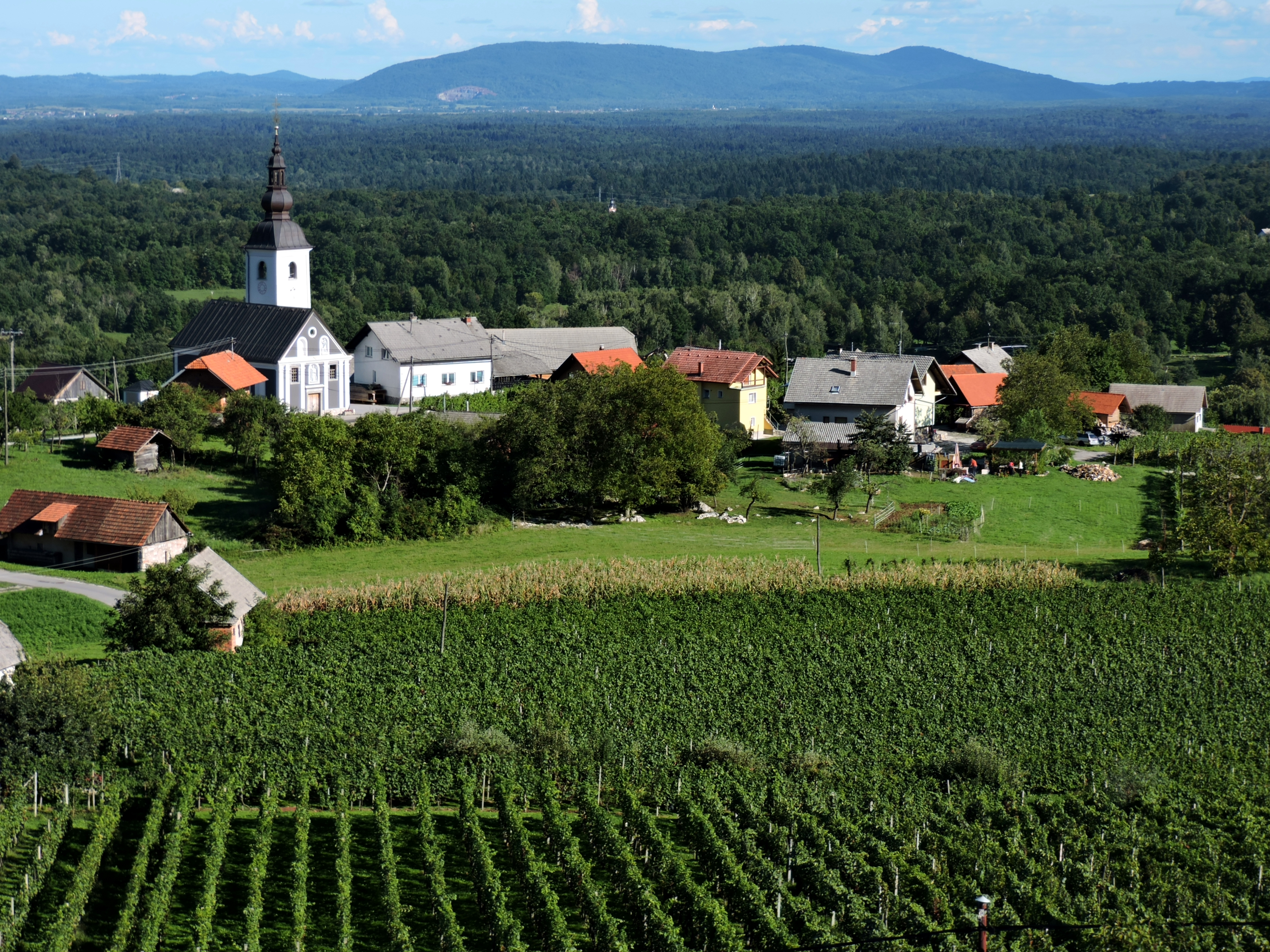
Spodnje Gorenjce with St. Joseph's Church

Semič contains a large number of hamlets, some of which used to be independent settlements. These include Coklovca, Gaber pri Semiču, Gora, Kašča, Kot pri Semiču (German: Winkel), Krč, Mladica, Podturn, Sadinja Vas (Sodinsdorf), Sela pri Semiču (Sela bei Heiligengeist), Trata, Vavpča Vas (Amtmannsdorf), Vrh, and Vrtača pri Semiču.

The name of the hamlet of Gaber, in the southwest part of the settlement, was changed to Gaber pri Semiču in 1953.

The name of the former village of Sela pri Svetem Duhu (literally, 'Sela by the Holy Spirit') in the east-central part of settlement was changed to Sela pri Semiču (literally, 'Sela by Semič') in 1955. The name was changed on the basis of the 1948 Law on Names of Settlements and Designations of Squares, Streets, and Buildings as part of efforts by Slovenia's postwar communist government to remove religious elements from toponyms. Sela pri Semiču ceased to exist as an independent settlement in 2001, when it was annexed by Semič.

== History ==
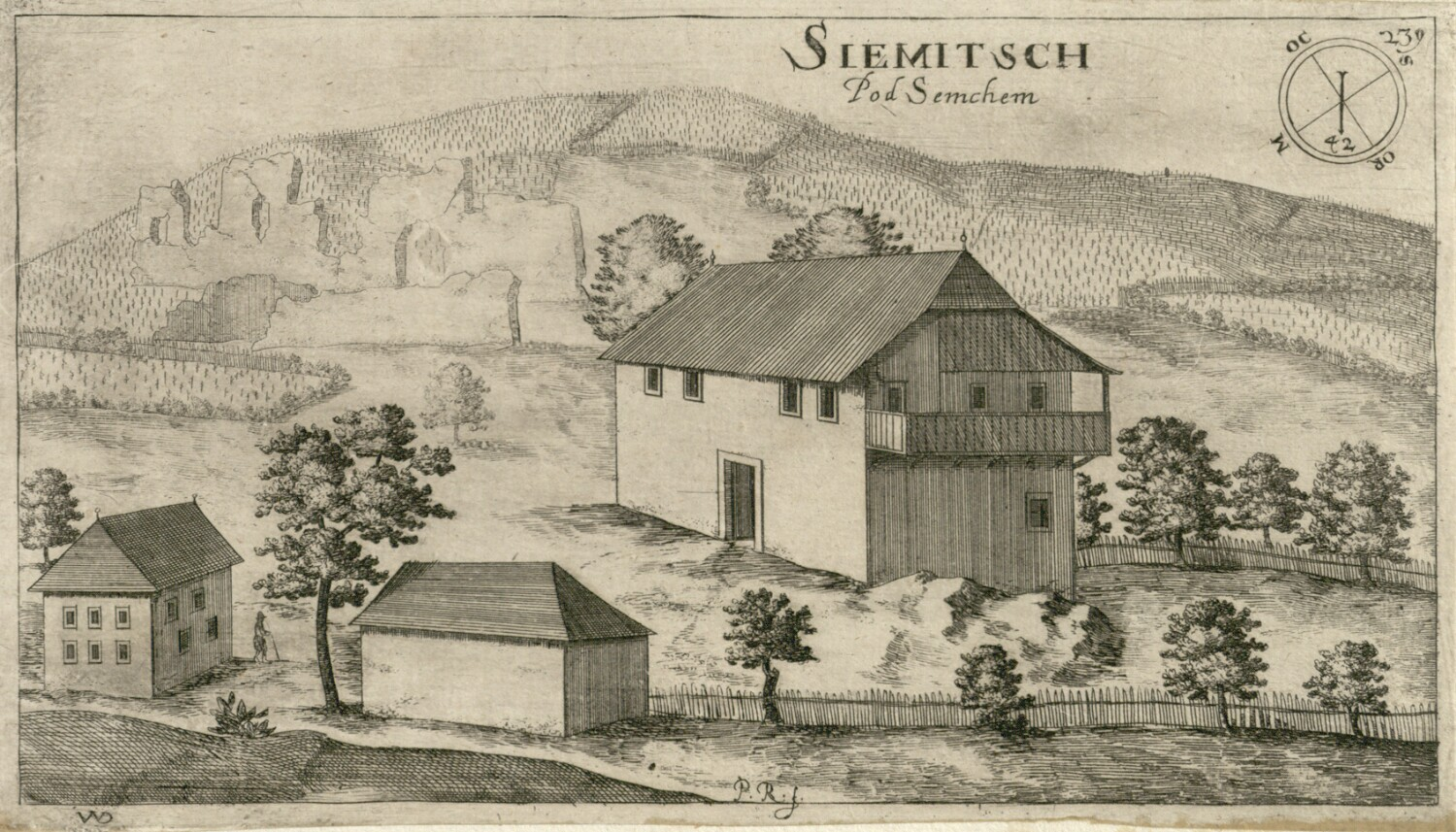
Siemitsch, Johann Weikhard von Valvasor, 1679

The settlement was first mentioned in the 13th century, during the colonisation of White Carniola as far as the Kolpa River by Slovene and German peasants, including Gottscheers. Its name derives from Semenič Castle, which formerly stood on a hill above the settlement. The parish church of Semič is dedicated to Saint Stephen and belongs to the Roman Catholic Diocese of Novo Mesto. It was first recorded in written sources in 1228.

As part of the Carniolan county of Metlika, Semič belonged to the Imperial Duchy of Carniola from 1364. Following its incorporation into the Habsburg monarchy, the settlement was attacked several times by Ottoman forces. In 1547, both the settlement and its fortified church were completely destroyed.

Together with Carniola, Semič became part of the Kingdom of Serbs, Croats and Slovenes, later Yugoslavia, in 1918. During World War II, it was the site of a Yugoslav Partisan base and airfield. Allied airmen, as well as escaped and liberated prisoners of war, were evacuated from there under the leadership of Ralph Churches.
