= Kuhlarji =

- Location in Slovenia
- Coordinates: 45°32′28.42″N 14°53′45.60″E
- Country: Slovenia
- Traditional region: Lower Carniola
- Statistical region: Southeast Slovenia
- Municipality: Kočevje

Area
  - Total: 1.06 km^{2} (0.41 sq mi)

Population (2012)
  - Total: 0

Kuhlarji (pronounced [ˈkuːxlaɾji]; in older sources also Kihlerje, German: Küchlern, Gottscheerish: Kichlarn) is a village in the Municipality of Kočevje in southern Slovenia. The area is part of the traditional region of Lower Carniola and is now included in the Southeast Slovenia Statistical Region. It no longer has any permanent residents.

== Geography ==
Kuhlarji lies in a basin connected by routes to Zdihovo and Morava. Nearby elevations include Ajbik Hill (661 m), Kuchelj Hill (Slovene: Kuheljsko brdo, 653 m), and Bolvik Hill (622 m). There are two karst caves in the vicinity: Wide Shaft (Široko brezno) and Dove Cave (Golobja jama).

== Name ==
The names Kuhlarji and Küchlern are believed to be derived from the surname Kuche, which was also attested in the settlement in 1574. The name therefore means 'village where the Kuche family lives'.

== History ==
Kuhlarji was a Gottschee German village. In the land registry of 1574 it had one full farm divided into two half-farms with three landowners, corresponding to a population between 10 and 14. In the 1770 census there were four houses in the village. The village reached its maximum population in 1880, when there were 25 people living in the settlement. Before the Second World War, when the village was destroyed, it had four houses and a population of 17. At the time, the livelihood of the settlement was base on agriculture and peddling. The original ethnic German population, totaling 15 people from three houses, was evicted on 18 December 1941. A Gottschee German woman named Juliana Bauer, together with her son and an elderly Gottschee German man (surname Wittine), refused to leave the village and were still living in one of the houses there until they were forcibly relocated in 1953 in order to make way for a military installation.
