= Rajhenav =

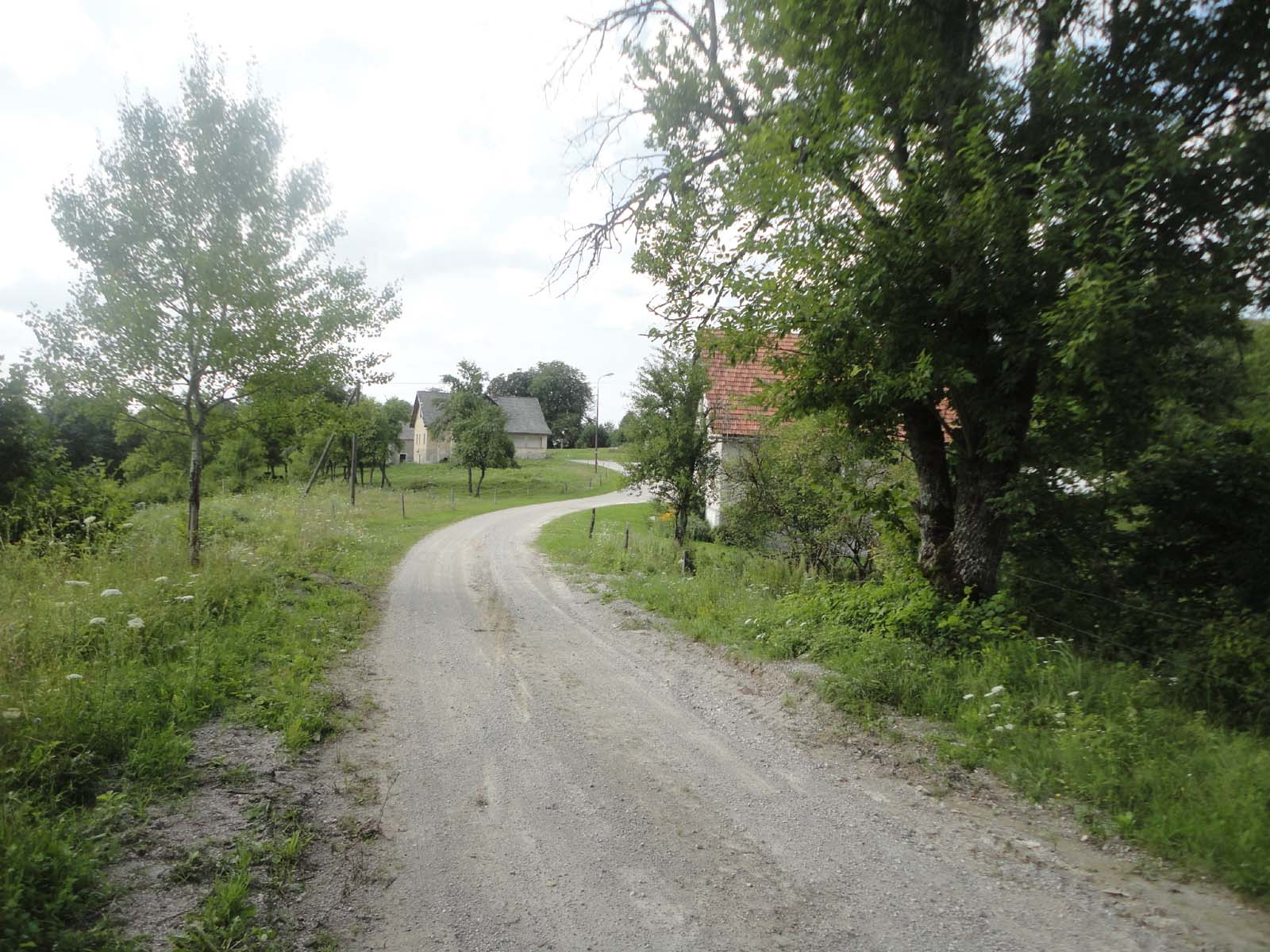

- Location in Slovenia
- Coordinates: 45°38′15.85″N 14°59′41.93″E
- Country: Slovenia
- Traditional region: Lower Carniola
- Statistical region: Southeast Slovenia
- Municipality: Kočevje

Area
  - Total: 18.57 km^{2} (7.17 sq mi)
- Elevation: 662.9 m (2,175 ft)

Population (2012)
  - Total: 2
- Postal code: 1330

Rajhenav (pronounced [ˈɾaːi̯xɛnau̯]; German: Reichenau) is an abandoned settlement in the Municipality of Kočevje in southern Slovenia. The area is part of the traditional region of Lower Carniola and is now included in the Southeast Slovenia Statistical Region.

== Geography ==
Rajhenav was formerly a compact ribbon village along the road from Kočevje to Koprivnik, with a trail connecting it to the Rog Sawmill. It lies in a basin northwest of Koprivnik and west of Podstene and is surrounded by low mountains and hills. Elder Mountain (Slovene: Bezgova gorica, 1009 m) stands to the east, Stone Mountain (Kamena gorica, 850 m) and the Rajhenav Woods (Rajhenavski gozd) to the north, Highlander Mountain (Rovtarska gorica, 842 m) to the southeast, and Cross Mountain (Križna gorica, 769 m) to the south.

The Rajhenav Woods is an old-growth forest. It became the first natural area in Slovenia to receive official protection in 1892, when 51 hectares of virgin forest were sectioned off and named after Rajhenav. The forestry official Leopold Hufnagel was in charge of the designation and stipulated that it be preserved from logging. The forest stands on a high karst plateau between 850 and 920 meters in elevation. It is dominated by beech and silver fir, and is a habitat for many wild animals, especially birds.

The Prelesnik Sink (Slovene: Prelesnikova koliševka) is a large collapse sinkhole that was created when a large karst cave collapsed, creating steep walls on all sides. The geography creates a temperature inversion, providing a habitat for spruce, mosses, and other typical high-elevation plants because of the cold air that pools there. The sinkhole is named after the forestry expert Anton Prelesnik, who first described the feature.

== History ==
Rajhenav was mostly inhabited by Gottschee Germans. It was founded around 1400 after the last wave of external colonization of the Kočevje area. According to the land inventory of 1574, the village consisted of 10 full farms that were divided into 20 half-farms. In addition to farm owners, there were also four tenant farmers in the village. During the Second World War its original Gottschee German population was evicted. The village was completely burned in the summer of 1942. On 15 August 1942, Italian forces shot 20 to 30 civilians about 700 meters from the village and then disposed of the bodied in karst sinkholes. On 26 June 1943 the Partisan Tomšič Brigade carried out a successful attack against an Italian military contingent near the village. After the war, only three houses remained in the village and the land was used by a state-owned dairy farm. Rajhenav was used by the Yugoslav military until 1991.

== Church ==
The local church was dedicated to Mary Magdalene and was a 17th-century building that was demolished in the 1960s. It was a chapel of ease belonging to the Parish of Koprivnik and it was located above the road in the middle of the village. It was originally dedicated to Saints Simon and Jude, but it was rededicated to Mary Magdalene in the 18th century. The square bell tower with a late-Baroque onion-dome roof and four clock faces was probably added to the northwest side of the original structure in the 19th century. The church had a rectangular nave with two windows on each side and a narrower chancel with rounded exterior walls and two additional windows; both sections were roofed with shingles. The church was sparsely furnished; the main altar was created by the woodcarver Jernej Jereb from Metlika. During the First World War, the Austro-Hungarian army removed the church's three bells, which were cast in the 18th and 19th centuries by the Samassa foundry in Ljubljana. The Samassa foundry cast new bells for the church in 1929, and they were consecrated on 16 May that year. The parishioners themselves paid for the smallest and largest bells, and the medium bell was financed by donations from Gottschee emigrants to the United States and by Prince Auersperg. The church was burned during the Second World War, probably in August 1942. The walls of the church were demolished in the early 1960s and crushed into road gravel. At the site where the church stood there is a memorial column with a plaque dated 1926.

== Notable people ==
Notable people that were born or lived in Rajhenav include:

- Viktor Stalzer (1920–2005), co-founder of the Gottschee Association (Gottscheer Landsmannschaft) in Klagenfurt, and co-founder and editor of the newspaper Gottscheer Zeitung
