= Škrilj, Kočevje =

Škrilj
- Location in Slovenia
- Coordinates: 45°32′5.78″N 14°54′26.2″E
- Country: Slovenia
- Traditional region: Lower Carniola
- Statistical region: Southeast Slovenia
- Municipality: Kočevje

Area
  - Total: 2.49 km^{2} (0.96 sq mi)
- Elevation: 522 m (1,713 ft)

Population (2012)
  - Total: 0

Škrilj (pronounced [ˈʃkɾiːl]; in older sources also Dolenje Zdihovo, German: Unterskrill) is a village in the Municipality of Kočevje in southern Slovenia. The area is part of the traditional region of Lower Carniola and is now included in the Southeast Slovenia Statistical Region. It no longer has any permanent residents.

== History ==
Škrilj was a Gottschee German village. The village was laid waste in an Ottoman raid in 1491. In 1942 the village was the site of a civilian refugee camp for people that had fled into the forests from Italian occupation forces. During the Second World War three houses in the village were destroyed in aerial bombardment, but the remaining 13 survived. The village was gradually abandoned after the war; in 1953 four houses were still inhabited.

== Church ==
The church in the village was a chapel of ease dedicated to the Holy Cross and it dated from the beginning of the 17th century. The church stood at the top of a hill at the western edge of the village. It had a short rectangular nave and a narrow polygonal chancel walled on three sides. It was probably built in the first half of the 17th century. According to Johann Weikhard von Valvasor, the main altar was dedicated to the Holy Cross and the side altars to the Virgin Mary and Saint Margaret. After 1840 it became a vicariate to Zdihovo. The belfry was probably added at this time and a bell cast in 1844 was installed. The church still stood in 1950, but like many other churches in the region it was destroyed between 1953 and 1954. The church was also surrounded by a cemetery. Today only the threshold of the church and the remnants of a few gravestones remain.
