= Kačji Potok =

- Location in Slovenia
- Coordinates: 45°34′41.06″N 14°57′57.23″E
- Country: Slovenia
- Traditional region: Lower Carniola
- Statistical region: Southeast Slovenia
- Municipality: Kočevje

Area
  - Total: 3.24 km^{2} (1.25 sq mi)
- Elevation: 526.9 m (1,729 ft)

Population (2012)
  - Total: 3
- Postal code: 1330

Kačji Potok (pronounced [ˈkaːtʃji ˈpɔːtɔk]; German: Otterbach) is a settlement in the Municipality of Kočevje in southern Slovenia. The area is part of the traditional region of Lower Carniola and is now included in the Southeast Slovenia Statistical Region.

== Geography ==
Kačji Potok lies in a valley southeast of Mozelj below the east slope of the Šibje Ridge and Štajdoh (or Štavdoh) Hill (637 meters or 2,090 feet). Hribček Hill (575 meters or 1,886 feet) stands to the northwest, and the losing stream sharing the name of the village, Snake Creek (Kačji potok), lies to the southeast. The village is surrounded by woods where many blueberries grow.

== Name ==
The name Kačji Potok means 'snake creek'. The village was attested in historical sources in 1574 as Otterpach (literally, 'otter creek' < German Otter 'otter' + Bach 'creek'), presumably named after otters living there. The Slovenian name Kačji Potok is a later (mis)translation of the German name (cf. German Otter 1. 'otter', 2. 'adder, viper').

== History ==
Kačji Potok was historically a Gottschee German village. In the land registry of 1574 the village consisted of 12 half-farms. Before the Second World War, the village had 22 houses. Italian forces burned the village in the summer of 1942, leaving only one house standing. During the war, a nearby abandoned mill was used as a field hospital by the Partisans—a forerunner to a later facility at Staro Brezje. After the war, the remaining house in the village was torn down and the Kočevje Collective Farm (KGP Kočevje) built two barns for cattle at the site.

== Church ==
The village church, dedicated to Saint Stephen, was a 15th-century structure and was mentioned in historical sources around 1526. It was refurbished in the 18th and 19th century, but was demolished after the Second World War.
