= Mrtvice, Kočevje =

Mrtvice
- Location in Slovenia
- Coordinates: 45°39′32.72″N 14°48′38.09″E
- Country: Slovenia
- Traditional region: Lower Carniola
- Statistical region: Southeast Slovenia
- Municipality: Kočevje

Area
  - Total: 10.19 km^{2} (3.93 sq mi)
- Elevation: 892.3 m (2,927 ft)

Population (2002)
  - Total: 40
- Postal code: 1332

Mrtvice (pronounced [məɾˈtʋiːtsɛ]; German: Gschwend or Geschwend) is a settlement northwest of the town of Kočevje in southern Slovenia. The area is part of the traditional region of Lower Carniola and is now included in the Southeast Slovenia Statistical Region.

== Name ==
The Slovene name Mrtvice is apparently cognate with the adjective mrtev dead, but the connection is unclear. One theory links the name with an old side channel or oxbow lake (mrtvica) of the Rinža River. Another theory connects the name with infertile soil. The German name Gschwend is believed to be derived from German schwenden 'to clear forest, especially by burning'. The name Gschwend was provisionally used during the Second World War as a new name for a planned Gottschee German resettlement in the Rann Triangle.

== History ==
Mrtvice is a newer settlement, officially created from parts of the Gottschee German villages of Koblarji and Slovenska Vas in January 1953. Prior to this the name was primarily used as a microtoponym. Consequently, Mrtvice was not mentioned in the land registry of 1574 or in the census of 1770. Nonetheless, mention was occasionally made of Mrtvice (as Gschwend) as a settlement, such as in a postal notice of 1899, when its postal authority was reassigned from Kočevje to Slovenska Vas. Mrtvice primarily developed as a bedroom community for people working in Kočevje.

== Notable people ==
Notable people that were born or lived in Mrtvice include:

- Josef Krauland (1897–1973), medical advisor
