= Mokri Potok =

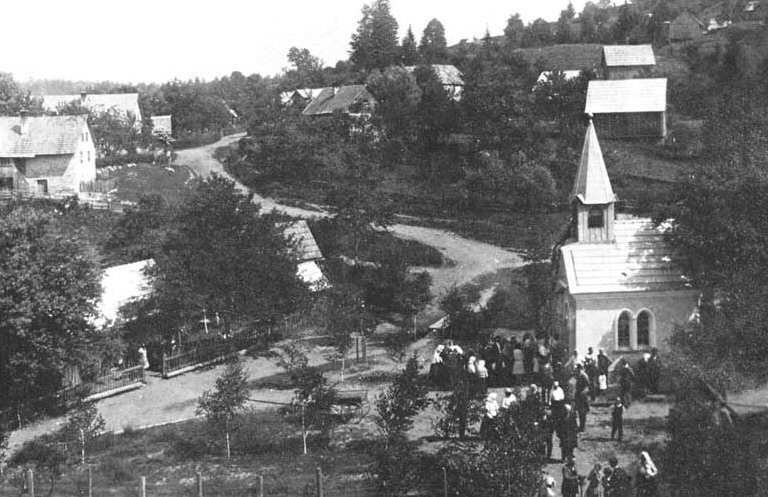
- Mokri Potok before the Second World War

- Location in Slovenia
- Coordinates: 45°33′28.70″N 14°49′36.94″E
- Country: Slovenia
- Traditional region: Lower Carniola
- Statistical region: Southeast Slovenia
- Municipality: Kočevje

Area
  - Total: 2.03 km^{2} (0.78 sq mi)

Population (2012)
  - Total: 0

Mokri Potok (pronounced [ˈmɔːkɾi ˈpɔːtɔk]; earlier Spodnji Vecenbah Spodnji Vencenbah, or Brusni potok, German: Unterwetzenbach) is a village in the Municipality of Kočevje in southern Slovenia. The area is part of the traditional region of Lower Carniola and is now included in the Southeast Slovenia Statistical Region. It no longer has any permanent residents.

== Name ==
The Slovene name Mokri Potok literally means 'wet stream' and may be an ironic name because the watercourse with the same name is often dry. The German name Unterwetzenbach (literally, 'lower Wetzenbach) is paired with neighboring Oberwetzenbach (literally, 'upper Wetzenbach), which is named Sadni Hrib in Slovene. The origin of the name Wetzenbach is uncertain. The most common explanation is that it refers to the surname Wetz (i.e., 'Wetz's Creek'), which was attested in the Gottschee area. Another theory holds that the name Wetzenbach is a corruption of Weiss Bach 'White Creek'. The Slovenian name Brusni potok (literally, 'whetting steam') was used in prewar Yugoslavia and was a mistranslation of the German name, mistaking the modifier Wetzen- for the verb wetzen 'to whet, hone'.

== History ==
Mokri Potok was a Gottschee German village. In the land registry of 1498 it had three full farms divided into six half-farms. In the land registry of 1574 there were four half-farms as well as a full farm owned by the mayor. Before the Second World War the village had 19 houses. The village was not destroyed during the war, when its original inhabitants were expelled. The last residents abandoned the village in 1965.

== Chapel ==
A chapel of ease dedicated to Saint Anne was built in the village by June 14, 1930, when it was consecrated. The chapel belonged to the parish of Kočevska Reka, and it stood at the site of an earlier structure that had been built in the 19th century and fallen into ruin. The chapel had a rectangular layout and a gabled roof, and a belfry with a tall pointed roof stood above the gable. The doorframe was finished with a semicircular arch at the top, flanked on both sides by lesenes topped by triangular ornamentation. The side walls had double lancet windows. The chapel was probably destroyed circa 1955, and no visible ruins of the structure remain at the site.
