= Hreljin, Kočevje =

Hreljin
- Location in Slovenia
- Coordinates: 45°29′22.98″N 15°1′38.49″E
- Country: Slovenia
- Traditional region: Lower Carniola
- Statistical region: Southeast Slovenia
- Municipality: Kočevje

Area
  - Total: 0.8 km^{2} (0.31 sq mi)
- Elevation: 341 m (1,119 ft)

Population (2015)
  - Total: 0

Hreljin (pronounced [ˈxɾeːljin]) is an uninhabited settlement on the left bank of the Kolpa River in the Municipality of Kočevje in southern Slovenia. The area is part of the traditional region of Lower Carniola and is now included in the Southeast Slovenia Statistical Region.

== History ==
Hreljin consisted of one full farm in the land register of 1576. The censuses of 1880, 1890, and 1900 recorded four houses in the village, and three in 1910. Until the Second World War, there were still two houses in the village. Hreljin lost its last male residents in October 1943, when they were taken prisoner by German forces in Laze pri Predgradu; one was shot on sight, and the remaining three were taken to Hreljin and shot there. The last inhabitant of Hreljin left the village in 1958.
