= Podjetniško Naselje Kočevje =

- Location in Slovenia
- Coordinates: 45°39′17.52″N 14°50′58.94″E
- Country: Slovenia
- Traditional region: Lower Carniola
- Statistical region: Southeast Slovenia
- Municipality: Kočevje

Area
  - Total: 0.1 km^{2} (0.039 sq mi)
- Elevation: 472.0 m (1,548.6 ft)

Population (2015)
  - Total: 1
- Postal code: 1330

Podjetniško Naselje Kočevje (pronounced [pɔˈdjeːtniʃki naˈseːljɛ kɔˈtʃeːu̯jɛ]; Slovene: Podjetniško naselje Kočevje) is a settlement above the left bank of the Rinža River, immediately northwest of the town of Kočevje in southern Slovenia. The area is part of the traditional region of Lower Carniola and is now included in the Southeast Slovenia Statistical Region.

== History ==
Podjetniško Naselje Kočevje was created in 2000, when it was administratively separated from Breg pri Kočevju.
