= Paka pri Predgradu =

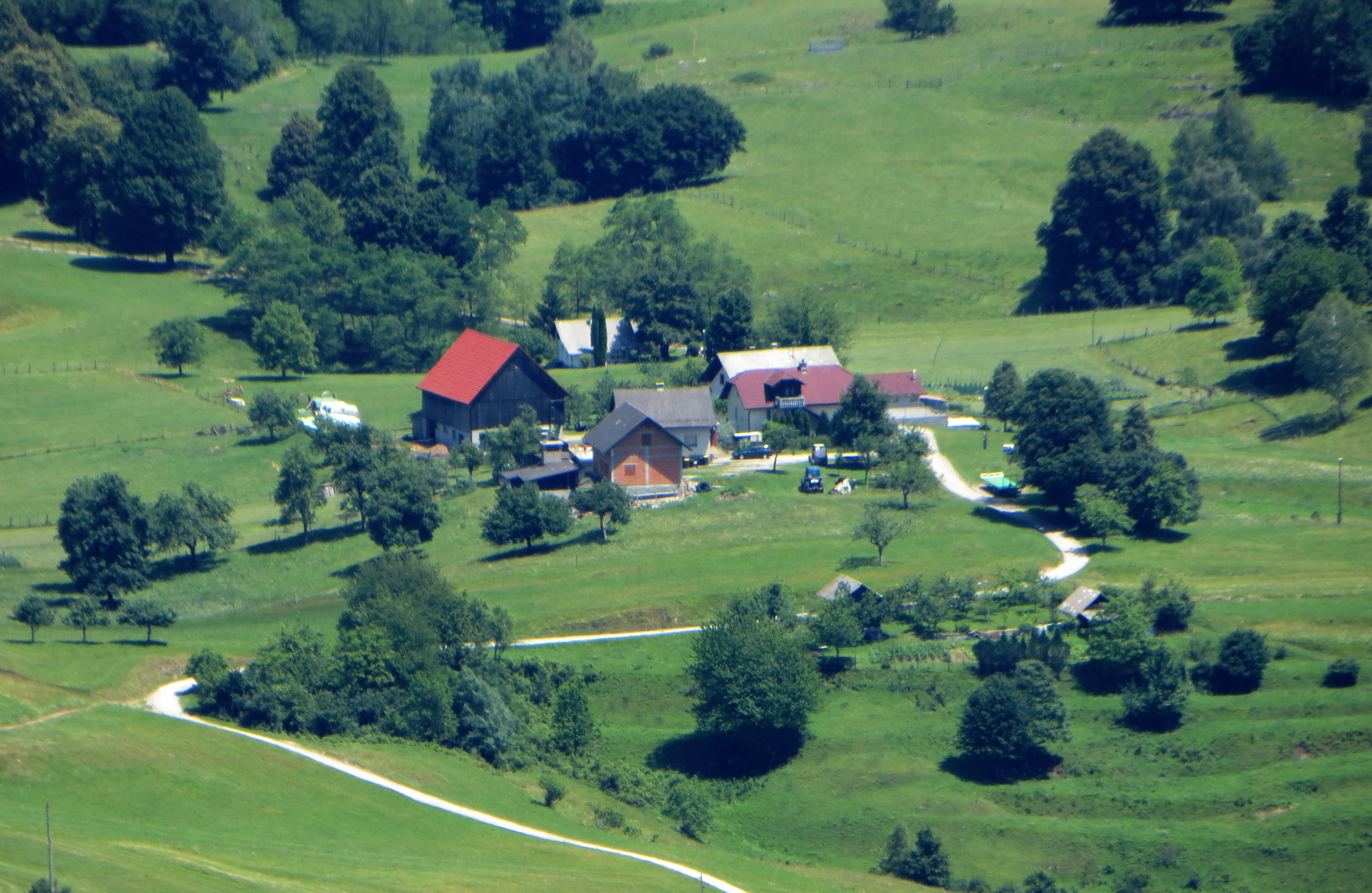

- Location in Slovenia
- Coordinates: 45°30′22.49″N 15°4′5.48″E
- Country: Slovenia
- Traditional region: Lower Carniola
- Statistical region: Southeast Slovenia
- Municipality: Kočevje

Area
  - Total: 5.9 km^{2} (2.3 sq mi)
- Elevation: 385.1 m (1,263 ft)

Population (2002)
  - Total: 14
- Postal code: 8342

Paka pri Predgradu (pronounced [ˈpàːka pɾi ˈpɾéːdɡɾadu]) is a small settlement northwest of Stari Trg ob Kolpi in southern Slovenia. It belongs to the Municipality of Kočevje. The area is part of the traditional region of Lower Carniola and is now included in the Southeast Slovenia Statistical Region.

== Name ==
The name of the settlement was changed from Paka to Paka pri Predgradu in 1955.
