= Rajndol =

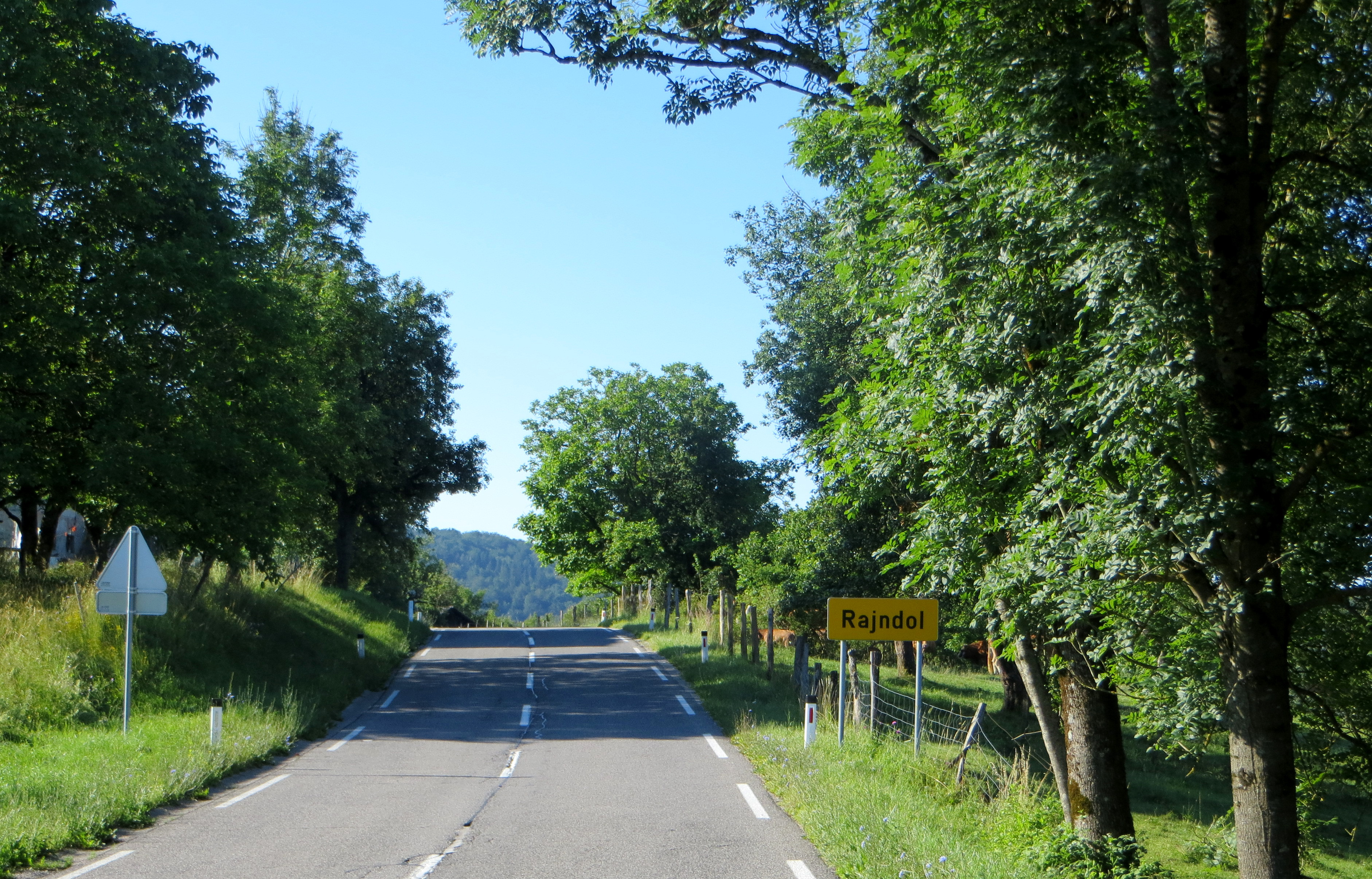

- Location in Slovenia
- Coordinates: 45°34′4.11″N 14°56′50.83″E
- Country: Slovenia
- Traditional region: Lower Carniola
- Statistical region: Southeast Slovenia
- Municipality: Kočevje

Area
  - Total: 5.27 km^{2} (2.03 sq mi)
- Elevation: 509.9 m (1,673 ft)

Population (2002)
  - Total: 45
- Postal code: 1330

Rajndol (pronounced [ˈɾaːi̯ndɔl]; German: Reinthal or Reintal) is a small settlement in the Municipality of Kočevje in southern Slovenia. It was inhabited mostly by Gottschee Germans. During the Second World War its original population was expelled. The area is part of the traditional region of Lower Carniola and is now included in the Southeast Slovenia Statistical Region.

A mid-18th-century chapel in the village was dedicated to the Guardian Angels and was demolished in the 1950s along with much of the ecclesiastical heritage of the Kočevje area.
