= Ograja =

- Location in Slovenia
- Coordinates: 45°32′9.27″N 14°53′2.77″E
- Country: Slovenia
- Traditional region: Lower Carniola
- Statistical region: Southeast Slovenia
- Municipality: Kočevje

Area
  - Total: 2.87 km^{2} (1.11 sq mi)

Population (2012)
  - Total: 0

Ograja (pronounced [ɔˈɡɾaːja]; in older sources also Na Gradu or Nagrad, German: Suchenreuter or Suchenreuther) is a village in the Municipality of Kočevje in southern Slovenia. The area is part of the traditional region of Lower Carniola and is now included in the Southeast Slovenia Statistical Region. It no longer has any permanent residents.

== History ==
Ograja was a Gottschee German village. The village was founded after 1498; in the land registry of 1574 it consisted of a full farm divided into two half-farms. Before the Second World War the village had nine houses. The original inhabitants were expelled in November 1941. Several of the houses then fell into ruin, but of the remaining five houses, three were still inhabited in 1971.
