= Gornje Ložine =

- Location in Slovenia
- Coordinates: 45°41′32.51″N 14°48′1.17″E
- Country: Slovenia
- Traditional region: Lower Carniola
- Statistical region: Southeast Slovenia
- Municipality: Kočevje

Area
  - Total: 6.68 km^{2} (2.58 sq mi)
- Elevation: 476.3 m (1,563 ft)

Population (2002)
  - Total: 119
- Time zone: UTC+1 (Central European Time)
- Postal code: 1332
- ISO 3166 code: SVN

Gornje Ložine (pronounced [ˈɡoːɾnjɛ lɔˈʒiːnɛ]; in older sources also Gorenje Ložine, German: Oberloschin) is a settlement northeast of Kočevje in southern Slovenia. The area is part of the traditional region of Lower Carniola and is now included in the Southeast Slovenia Statistical Region. The settlement includes the site of the former hamlet of Schweinberg at the foot of Jasnica Hill (German: Schweinberg), now occupied by the formerly abandoned but since renovated Jasnica Recreation and Tourism Center.

== History ==
The Ložine volunteer fire department became a founding unit of the Kočevje municipal fire department on 28 August 1955.

== Church ==
The local church is dedicated to Saints Peter and Paul and belongs to the Parish of Stara Cerkev. It is a 15th-century late Gothic building that was refurbished in the 19th century. The main altar dates to 1861.
