= Nove Ložine =

- Location in Slovenia
- Coordinates: 45°41′10.58″N 14°48′57.63″E
- Country: Slovenia
- Traditional region: Lower Carniola
- Statistical region: Southeast Slovenia
- Municipality: Kočevje

Area
  - Total: 0.39 km^{2} (0.15 sq mi)
- Elevation: 467.8 m (1,535 ft)

Population (2002)
  - Total: 48
- Postal code: 1332

Nove Ložine (pronounced [ˈnɔːʋɛ lɔˈʒiːnɛ]; German: Neuloschin) is a small settlement northwest of the town of Kočevje in southern Slovenia. The area is part of the traditional region of Lower Carniola and is now included in the Southeast Slovenia Statistical Region.
