= Dolnje Ložine =

Dolnje Ložine Srednje Ložine (until 1952)
- Location in Slovenia
- Coordinates: 45°41′19.93″N 14°48′31.26″E
- Country: Slovenia
- Traditional region: Lower Carniola
- Statistical region: Southeast Slovenia
- Municipality: Kočevje

Area
  - Total: 1.17 km^{2} (0.45 sq mi)
- Elevation: 474.2 m (1,556 ft)

Population (2002)
  - Total: 57
- Postal code: 1332

Dolnje Ložine (pronounced [ˈdoːlnjɛ lɔˈʒiːnɛ]; in older sources also Dolenje Ložine, German: Niederloschin) is a small settlement in the Upper Rinža Valley northwest of Kočevje in southern Slovenia. The area is part of the traditional region of Lower Carniola and is now included in the Southeast Slovenia Statistical Region.

== Name ==
The name of the settlement was changed from Srednje Ložine to Dolnje Ložine in 1952. In the past the German name was Niederloschin.

== Cultural heritage ==
A small open roadside chapel-shrine in the settlement is dedicated to the Holy Family and was built in 1913.
