= Črni Potok pri Kočevju =

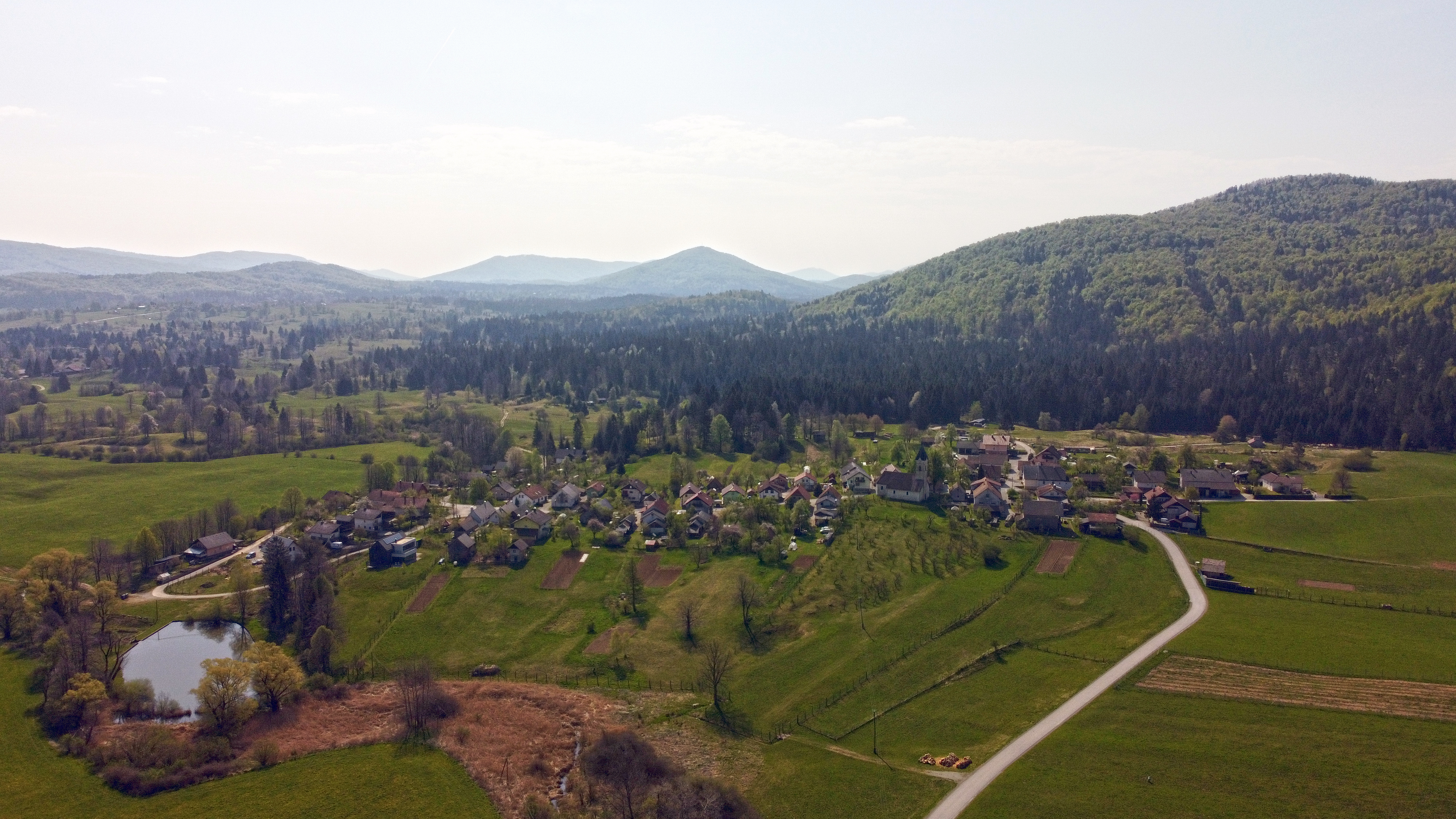

- Location in Slovenia
- Coordinates: 45°35′31.14″N 14°54′2.34″E
- Country: Slovenia
- Traditional region: Lower Carniola
- Statistical region: Southeast Slovenia
- Municipality: Kočevje

Area
  - Total: 6.37 km^{2} (2.46 sq mi)
- Elevation: 468 m (1,535 ft)

Population (2019)
  - Total: 154
- Postal code: 1330

Črni Potok pri Kočevju (pronounced [ˈtʃəɾni ˈpɔːtɔk pɾi kɔˈtʃeːu̯ju]; German: Schwarzenbach) is a settlement southeast of the town of Kočevje in southern Slovenia. The area is part of the traditional region of Lower Carniola and is now included in the Southeast Slovenia Statistical Region.

== Name ==
The name of the settlement was changed from Črni Potok to Črni Potok pri Kočevju in 1953. In the past the German name was Schwarzenbach.

== History ==
The Črni Potok volunteer fire department became a founding unit of the Kočevje municipal fire department on 28 August 1955.

== Church ==
The local church is dedicated to the Magi and belongs to the Parish of Kočevje. Fragments of late 15th-century frescos are preserved on its interior walls. Its main altar dates to the early 17th century.
