= Stari Breg =

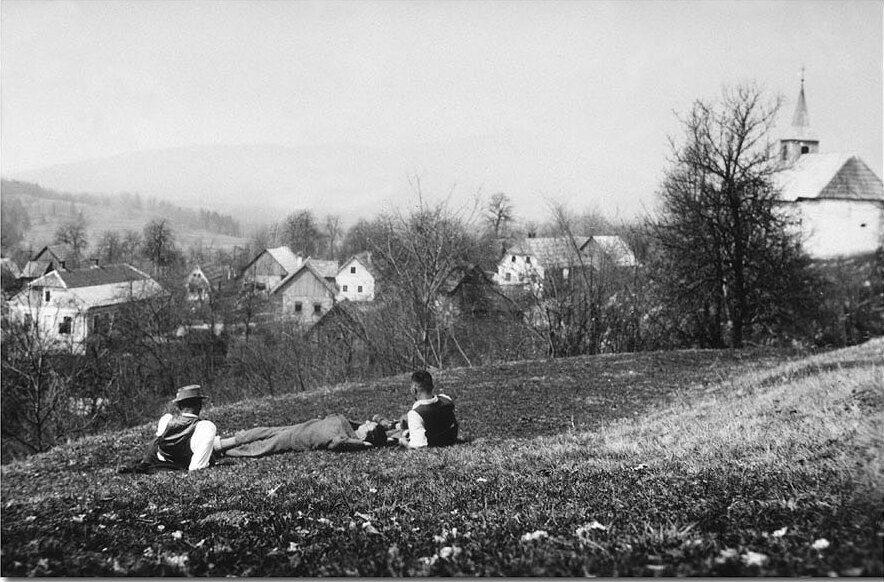
- Stari Breg in 1939

- Location in Slovenia
- Coordinates: 45°41′7.12″N 14°55′16.63″E
- Country: Slovenia
- Traditional region: Lower Carniola
- Statistical region: Southeast Slovenia
- Municipality: Kočevje

Area
  - Total: 3.97 km^{2} (1.53 sq mi)
- Elevation: 527.1 m (1,729 ft)

Population (2002)
  - Total: 5
- Postal code: 1330

Stari Breg (pronounced [ˈstaːɾi ˈbɾeːk]; German: Altbacher, Gottscheerish: Pachrn) is a settlement in the hills north of the town of Kočevje in southern Slovenia. The area is part of the traditional region of Lower Carniola and is now included in the Southeast Slovenia Statistical Region.

== Name ==
The name Stari Breg literally means 'old (river)bank, old creek' in Slovene. Slovene names containing the word breg referred not only to elevated land and to the land alongside a river or lake, but also to the stream itself. The Slovene name thus semantically matches the German name Altbacher 'old creek' as well as the shorter Gottscheerish form Pachrn. Additional Gottscheerish forms of the name include Altpacher and Pächer.

== History ==
Stari Breg was a village inhabited mostly by Gottschee Germans. A 1614 record stated that it consisted of three and a half hides (the Joke, Rigel, Peer, and Strausz farms). In the land register of 1754 it had seven half-farms. By 1770 it had 14 houses. In the fall of 1941 most of its original population was evicted, except for one Slovene family living in the village. After the Rog Offensive of 1942 a Partisan company was stationed in the vicinity for a month, and later the 3rd Company of the West Lower Carniola Detachment, which was later moved to new positions at Stari Log and Royal Rock Hill (Slovene: Kraljevi kamen) northeast of Novi Breg. After the war the Slovenian family remained living in Stari Breg. The former school building was converted into housing for collective farm workers, who cared for 60 to 70 head of cattle in two barns there.

== Church ==
The local church, dedicated to Saint Ursula, was a late-18th-century building that was heavily damaged in 1943. It was demolished in the 1960s.
