= Nemška Loka =

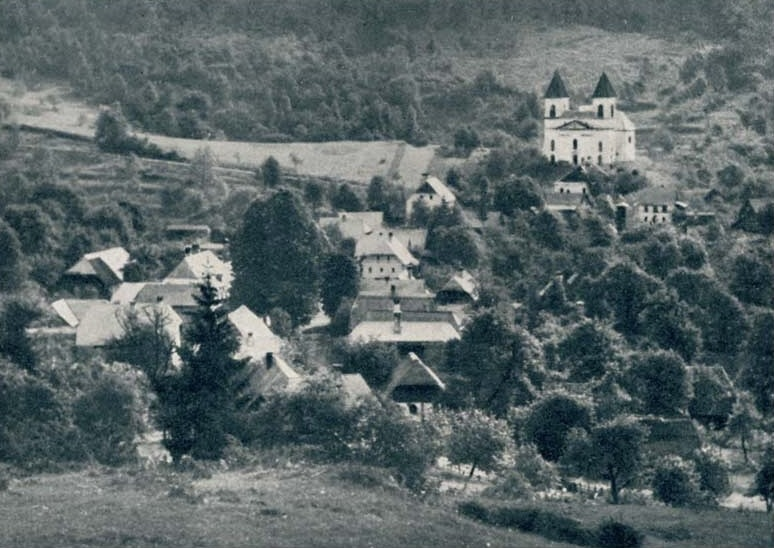
- Nemška Loka in 1939

- Location in Slovenia
- Coordinates: 45°33′29.13″N 15°2′39.02″E
- Country: Slovenia
- Traditional region: Lower Carniola
- Statistical region: Southeast Slovenia
- Municipality: Kočevje

Area
  - Total: 4.75 km^{2} (1.83 sq mi)
- Elevation: 466.7 m (1,531 ft)

Population (2002)
  - Total: 42
- Postal code: 1330

Nemška Loka (pronounced [ˈneːmʃka ˈloːka]; German: Unterdeutschau) is a settlement in the Municipality of Kočevje in southern Slovenia. It was inhabited mostly by Gottschee Germans. During the Second World War its original population was expelled. The area is part of the traditional region of Lower Carniola and is now included in the Southeast Slovenia Statistical Region.

== Name ==
Nemška Loka was attested in historical sources as Teutschau in 1574. The Slovene name Nemška Loka literally means 'German flood-meadow' and corresponds to the German name Unterdeutschau (literally, 'lower German flood-meadow'). The name refers to the local geography and the original ethnic German settlers that arrived in the 14th century.

== History ==
In 1574 the village had twelve half-farms and one tenant farmer. During the Ottoman raids, the villagers were responsible for carrying letters to Kočevje and Poljane Castle in Predgrad. Straža Hill (834 m) west of the settlement was used for bonfires and cannons fired as signals during these raids. An elementary school was established in the village in 1860 (and discontinued in 1947). In 1965 there were 10 families living in the village: five Slovenian, three Bosnian, one Croatian, and one Romani.

== Churches ==
The local parish church was dedicated to Mary Help of Christians and was a large Baroque pilgrimage church. It was demolished after the Second World War. A second church, dedicated to Saint Margaret in the hamlet of Tanči Vrh northwest of the main village was burned down in 1942 when the entire previously abandoned settlement was set on fire. It was not restored after the war. In 1980 the remaining nave collapsed and in 1992 the unsafe sanctuary was removed.
