= Čeplje, Kočevje =

Čeplje
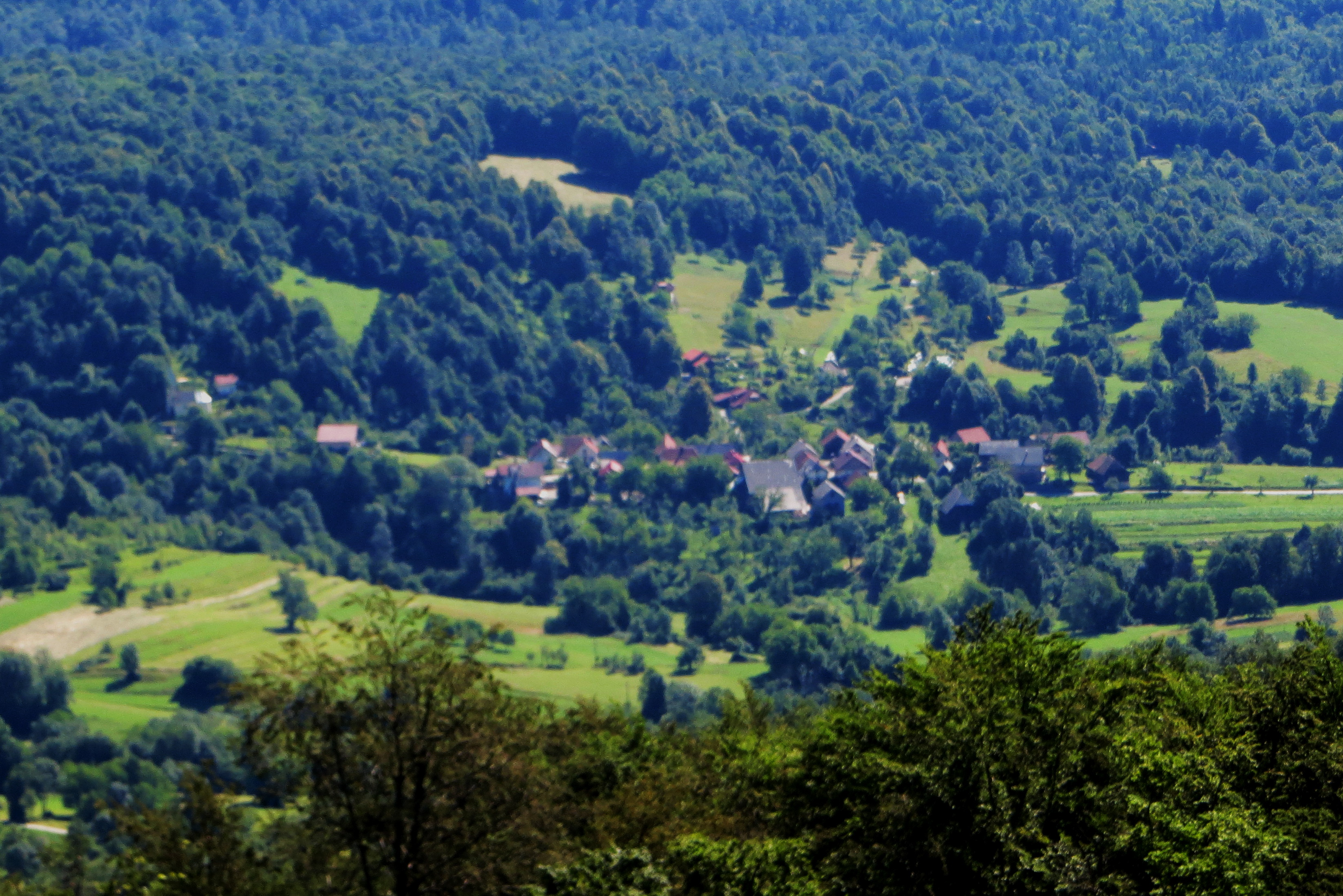

- Location in Slovenia
- Coordinates: 45°32′20.13″N 15°2′44.49″E
- Country: Slovenia
- Traditional region: Lower Carniola
- Statistical region: Southeast Slovenia
- Municipality: Kočevje

Area
  - Total: 2.56 km^{2} (0.99 sq mi)
- Elevation: 430.1 m (1,411 ft)

Population (2002)
  - Total: 20
- Postal code: 8342

Čeplje (pronounced [ˈtʃeːpljɛ]; German: Tscheplach) is a settlement in the Municipality of Kočevje in southern Slovenia. The area is part of the traditional region of Lower Carniola and is now included in the Southeast Slovenia Statistical Region.

The local church, on a hill north of the settlement, is dedicated to Our Lady of Sorrows and was built in the 1840s.
