= Gorenje, Kočevje =

Gorenje
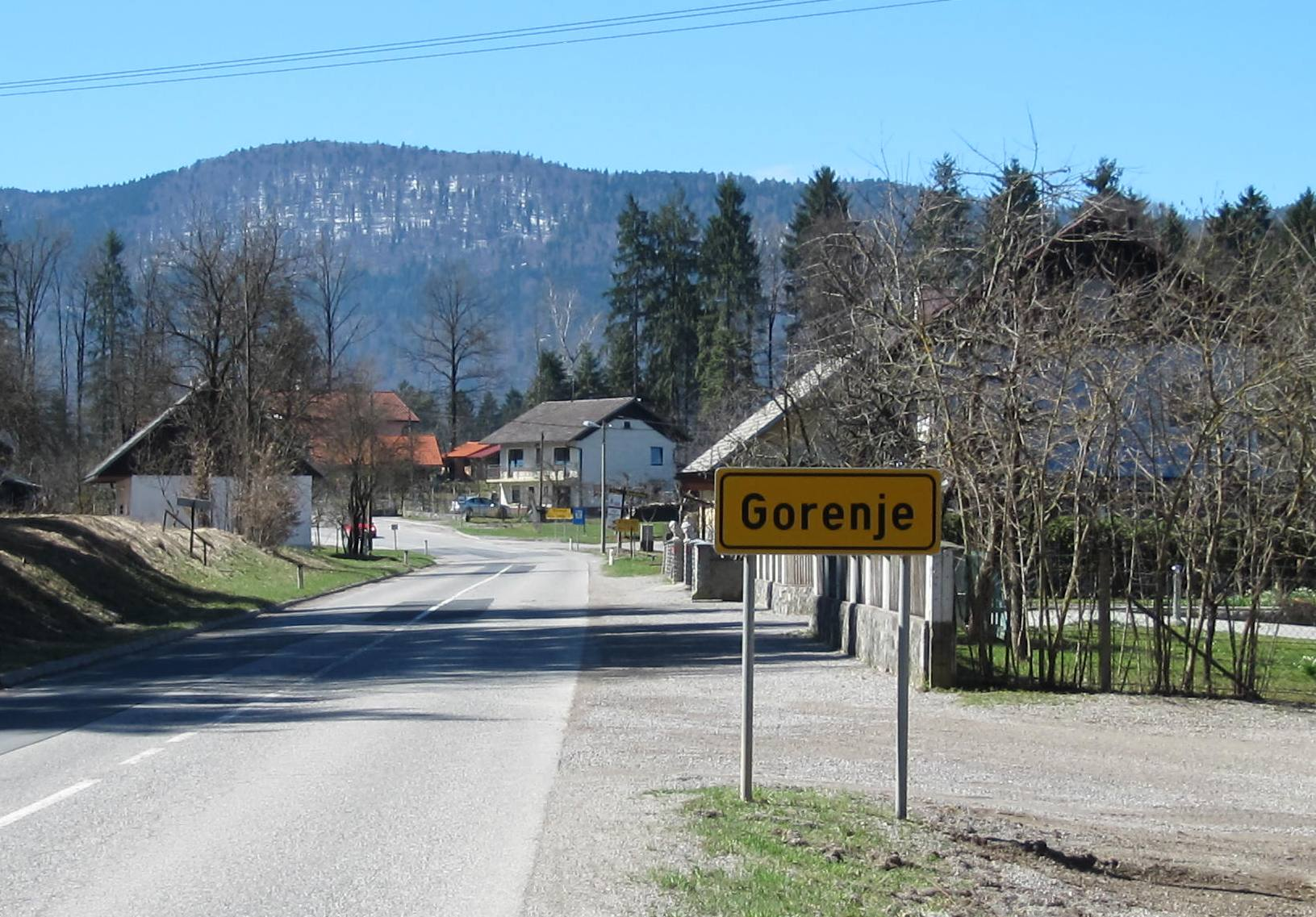

- Location in Slovenia
- Coordinates: 45°40′17″N 14°51′18″E
- Country: Slovenia
- Traditional region: Lower Carniola
- Statistical region: Southeast Slovenia
- Municipality: Kočevje

Area
  - Total: 0.68 km^{2} (0.26 sq mi)
- Elevation: 498 m (1,634 ft)

Population (2002)
  - Total: 327
- Postal code: 1332

Gorenje (pronounced [ɡɔˈɾeːnjɛ]; in older sources also Gornja vas, German: Obrern) is a settlement north of Kočevje in southern Slovenia. The area is part of the traditional region of Lower Carniola and is now included in the Southeast Slovenia Statistical Region. It includes the hamlets of Pri Studencu (German: Bein Brunnwirth) and Plumbirt.

== Name ==
The name Gorenje is shared by several settlements in Slovenia. It arose through ellipsis of Gorenje selo (literally, 'upper village'), denoting the elevation of the place in relation to a neighboring settlement. Gorenje stands about 18 meters (59 ft) higher than the neighboring villages to the west.

== Cultural heritage ==
A small late 19th-century chapel in the centre of the village is dedicated to Saint Joseph.

== Gallery ==
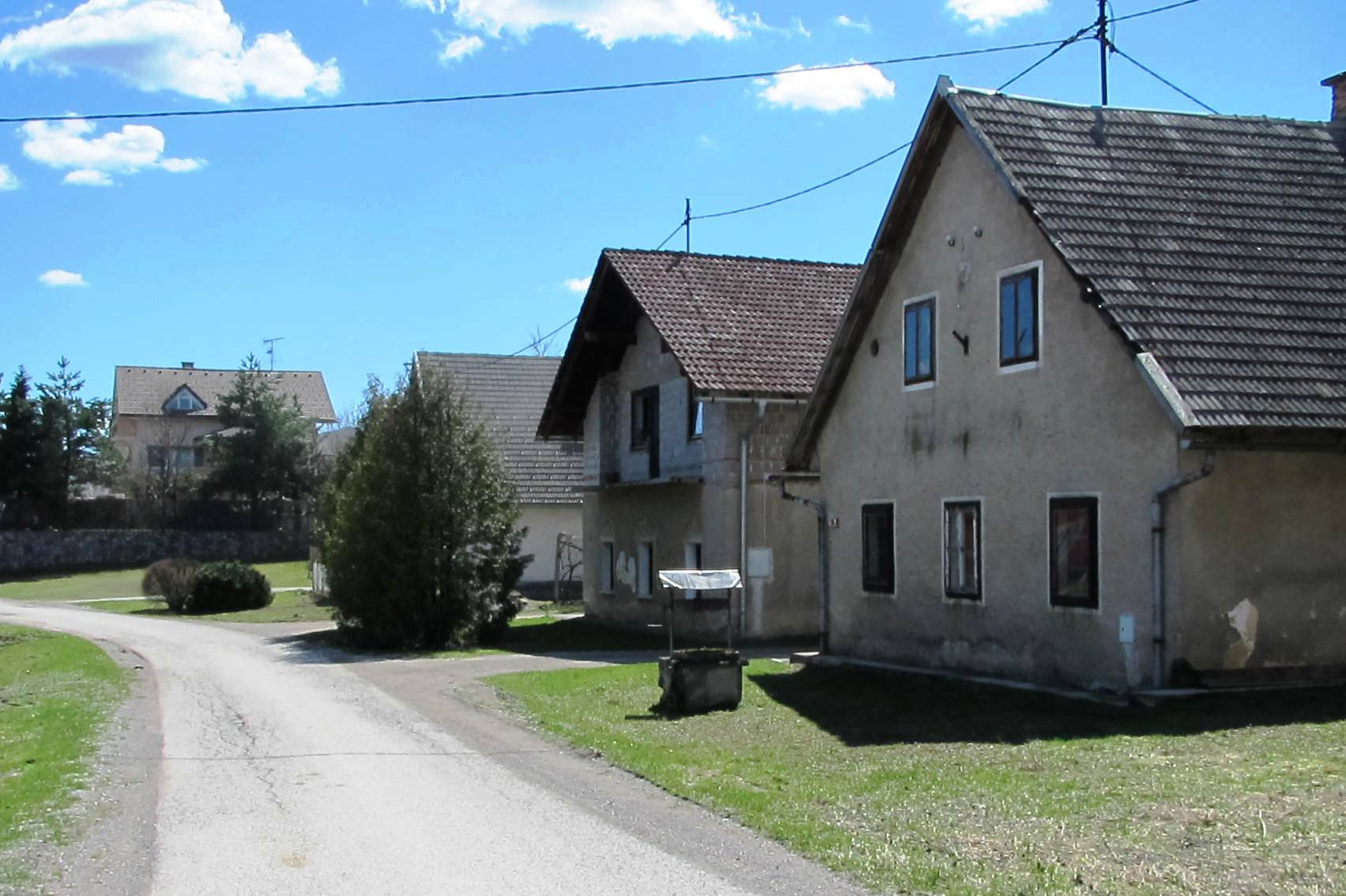
Old village core

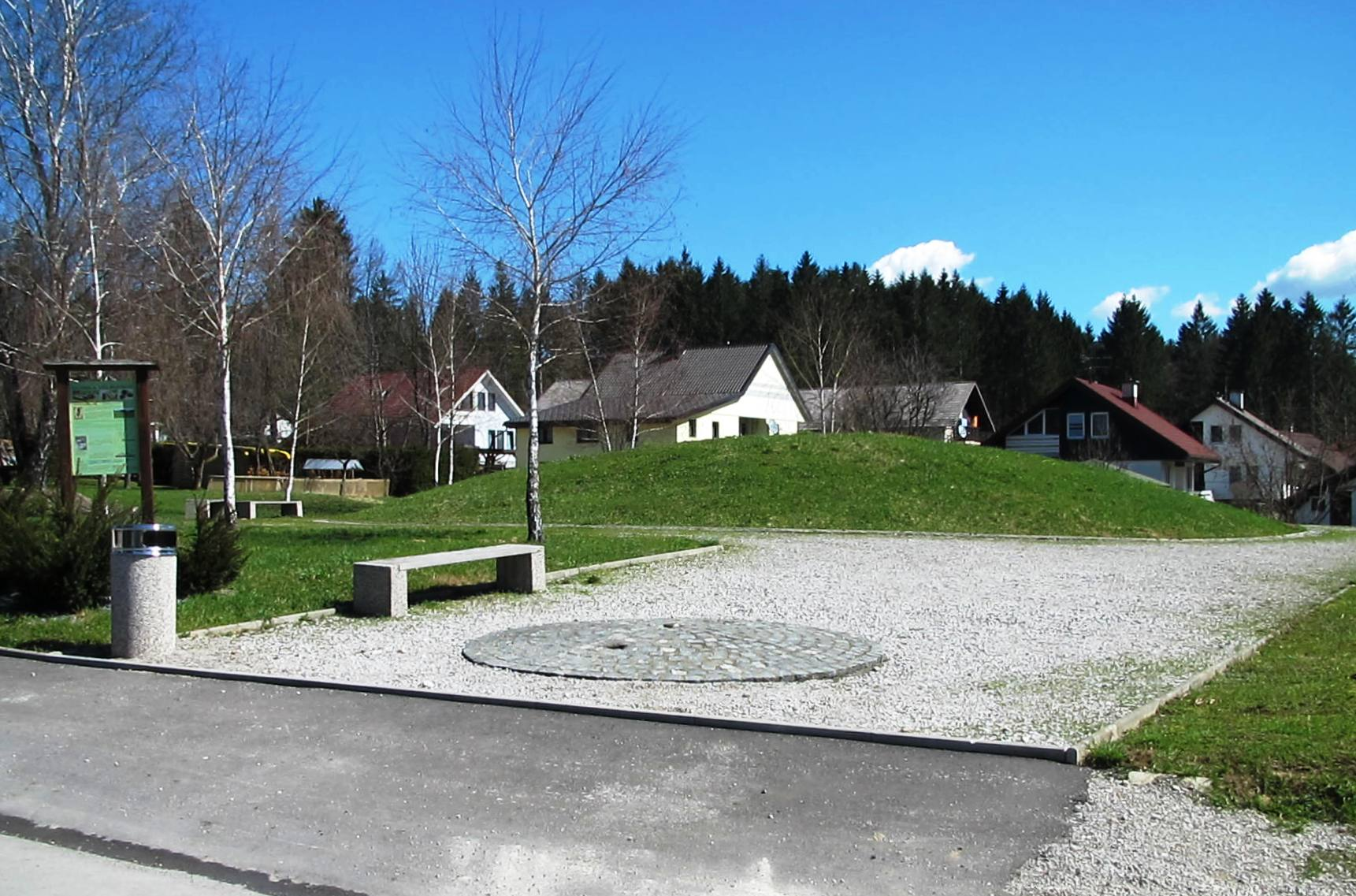
Hallstatt-era tumulus

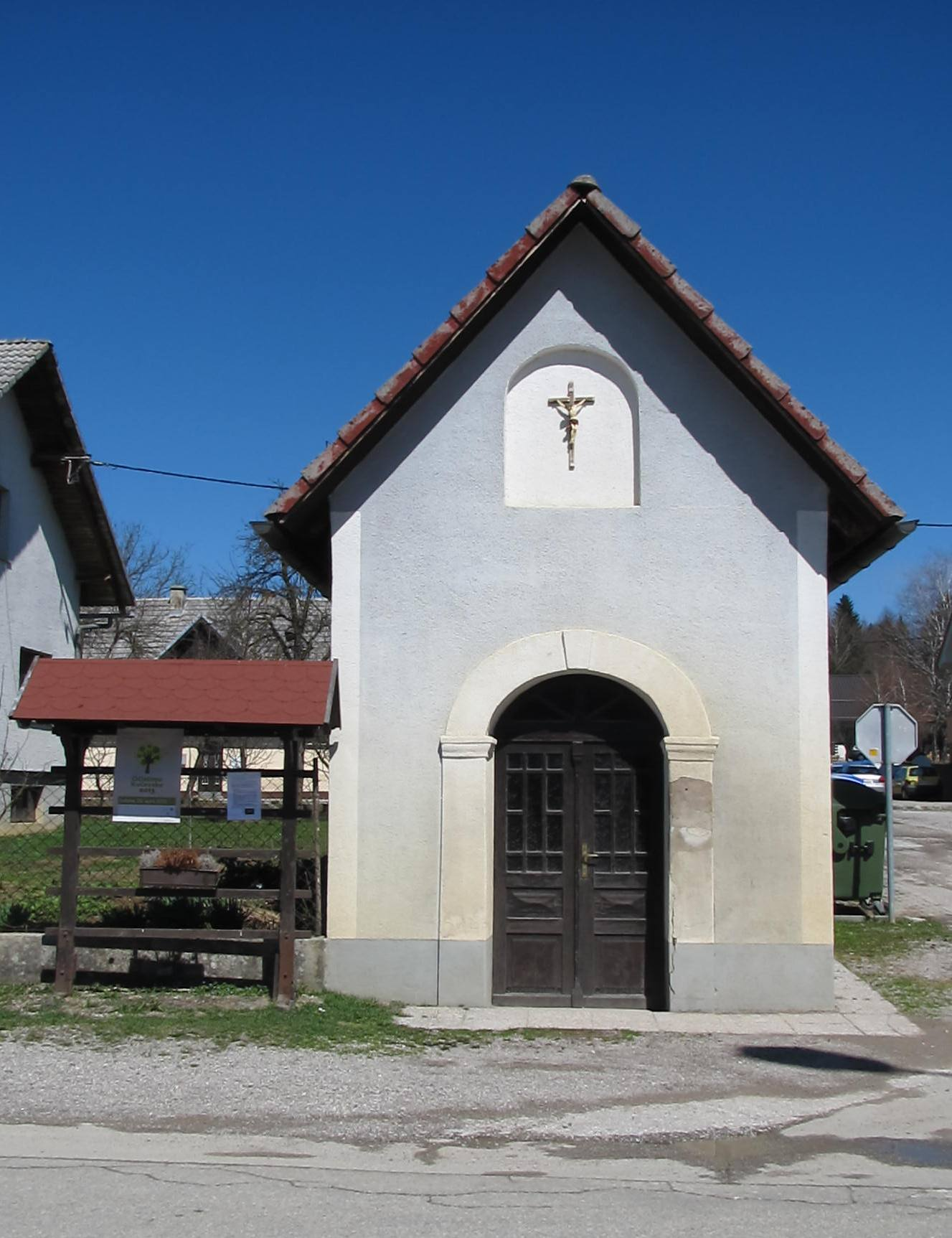
Village chapel
