= Spodnja Bilpa =

- Location in Slovenia
- Coordinates: 45°30′41.67″N 14°57′57.82″E
- Country: Slovenia
- Traditional region: Lower Carniola
- Statistical region: Southeast Slovenia
- Municipality: Kočevje

Area
  - Total: 0.87 km^{2} (0.34 sq mi)
- Elevation: 226.5 m (743 ft)

Population (2002)
  - Total: 4
- Postal code: 8342

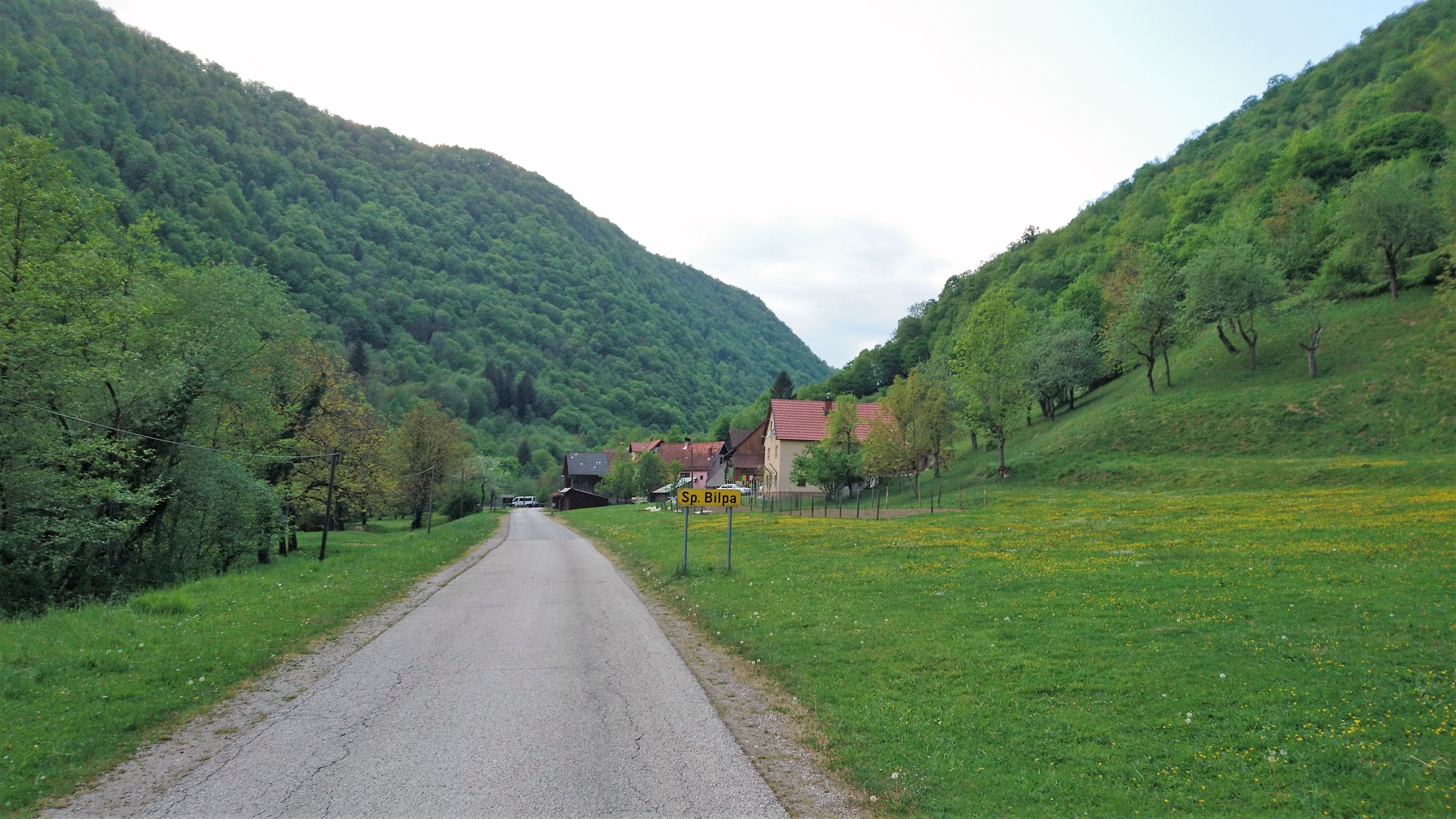
road leading into Spodnja ob Kolpi

Spodnja Bilpa (pronounced [ˈspoːdnja ˈbiːlpa]; in older sources also Dolenja Bilpa; German: Unterwilpen, Wilpen, Wildbach) is a small settlement on the left bank of the Kolpa River in the Municipality of Kočevje in southern Slovenia. The area is part of the traditional region of Lower Carniola and is now included in the Southeast Slovenia Statistical Region.

== Geography ==
Spodnja Bilpa is a clustered village on a terrace between the Kolpa River and Bilpa Creek (German: Wildbach), which flows to the surface from a cave below a high vertical rock wall. Bilpa Creek is also referred to as Wild Creek (Slovene: Dovji potok) in some sources. During dry periods, the volume of this karst spring greatly decreases, but after rain it gushes out strongly, flowing into the Kolpa. Bilpa Creek was formerly crossed by a wooden bridge, which would be submerged during flooding. Pahlin Spring and Jarak Spring lie below the settlement, and Viherle Cave (German: Wicherle) lies above it, to the northwest.

== Name ==
The name Spodnja Bilpa literally means 'lower Bilpa'. The name distinguished the settlement from Zgornja Bilpa (literally, 'upper Bilpa'), which had two houses and stood above the right bank of Bilpa Creek until 1907, when the last resident moved to Spodnja Bilpa. The Slovene name Bilpa is derived from German Wildbach 'stream prone to flash floods' (literally, 'wild stream').

== History ==
Spodnja Bilpa consisted of a single farm in the land registry of 1574.

== Legends ==
Two local legends relate to a cliff called Devil's Leap (Slovene: Hudičev skok), where Bilpa Creek joins the Kolpa River. The first legend says that a devil lived in the cave where Bilpa Creek flows to the surface, and would emerge to wreak havoc in Croatia, on the opposite side of the river. A Croatian priest discovered his lair and drove him out with an incantation, thus freeing Croatia from his torments. As the devil fled the cave, roaring and in a cloud of stench, he left an imprint of his foot and his hoof on the rock below the cliff.

The second legend lays that a Croatian bandit lived in the cave. A man discovered which part of the cave the bandit ate lunch in, and so the army surrounded it and fired a cannon into that part of the cave during lunchtime. The bandit was forced to surrender, but the explosion also forced out a devil, who left the mark of his foot and his hoof on the rock.
