= Šalka Vas =

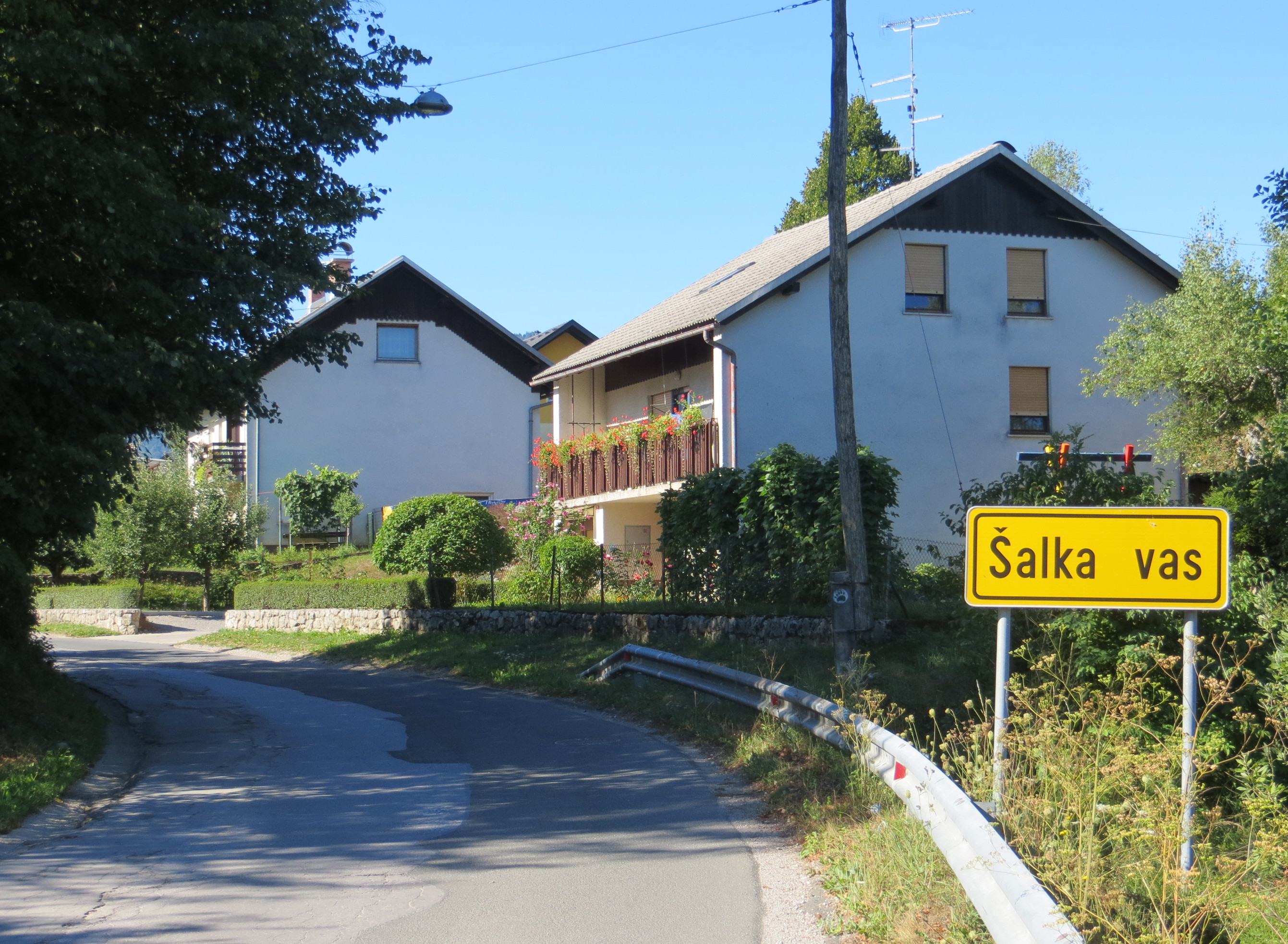

- Location in Slovenia
- Coordinates: 45°39′9.08″N 14°52′44.36″E
- Country: Slovenia
- Traditional region: Lower Carniola
- Statistical region: Southeast Slovenia
- Municipality: Kočevje

Area
  - Total: 1.66 km^{2} (0.64 sq mi)
- Elevation: 479.2 m (1,572 ft)

Population (2002)
  - Total: 674
- Postal code: 1330

Šalka Vas (pronounced [ˈʃaːu̯ka ˈʋaːs]; Slovene: Šalka vas, German: Schalkendorf) is a settlement immediately northeast of the town of Kočevje in southern Slovenia. The area is part of the traditional region of Lower Carniola and is now included in the Southeast Slovenia Statistical Region.

== Name ==
Šalka Vas was attested in historical records as Schalkhendorf in 1574. The name is believed to be derived from the Slavic personal name *Šalъ, referring to an early inhabitant of the place.

== History ==
The Šalka Vas volunteer fire department became a founding unit of the Kočevje municipal fire department on 28 August 1955.

== Church ==
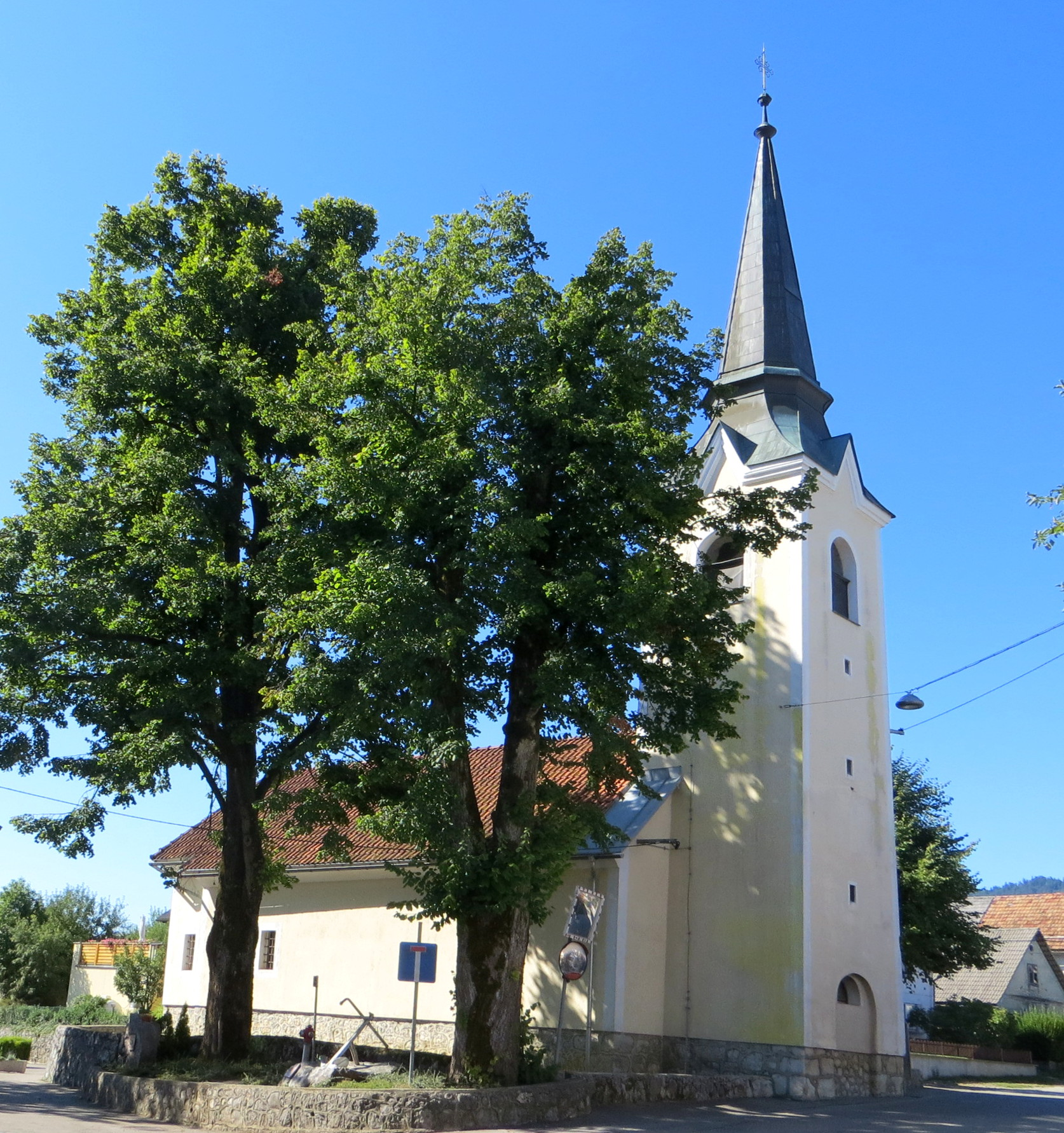
Saint Roch's Church

The local church is dedicated to Saint Roch and belongs to the Parish of Kočevje. It is a Late Gothic building that was extended in the 19th century.
