= Mahovnik =

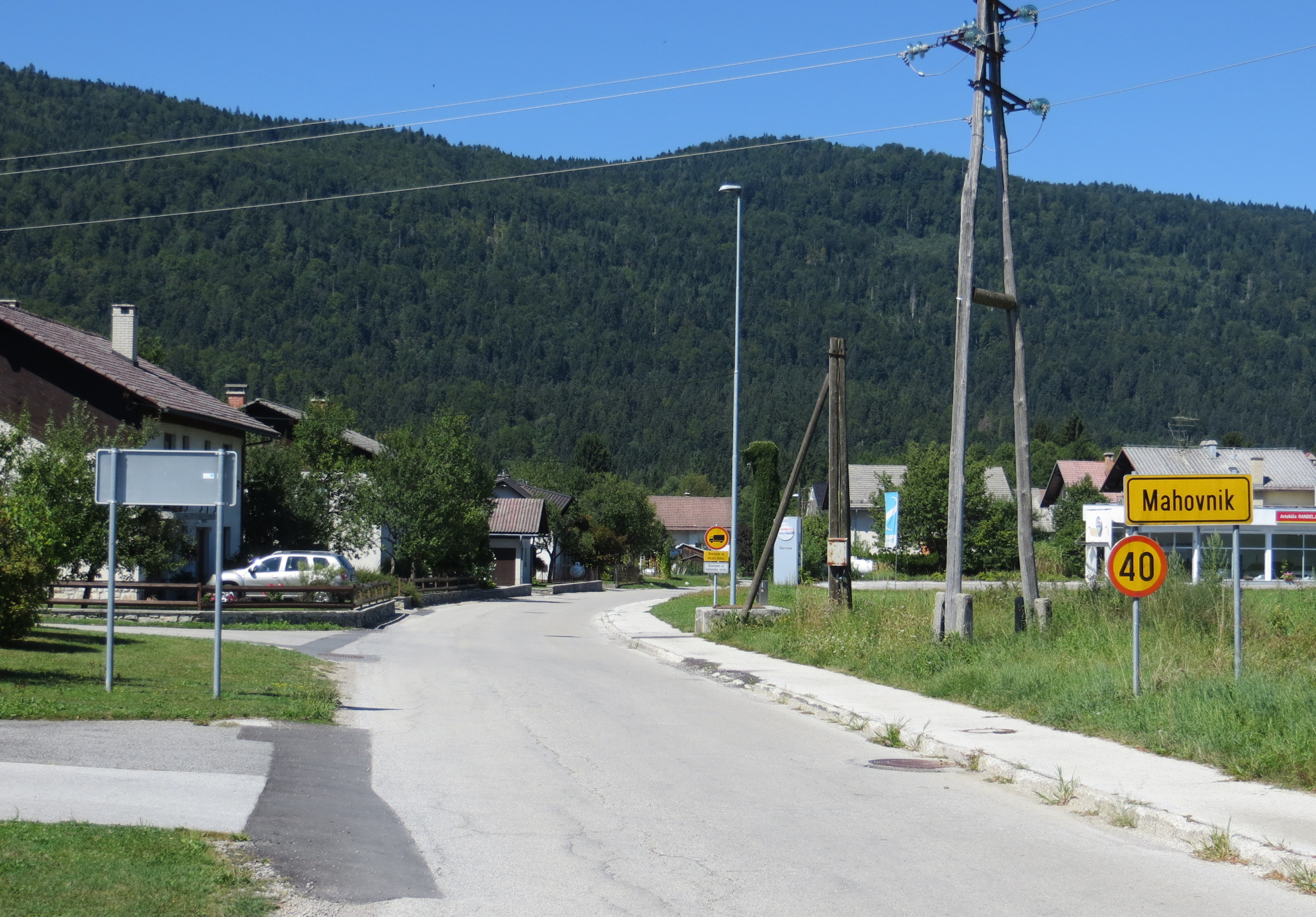

- Location in Slovenia
- Coordinates: 45°38′53.39″N 14°50′49.85″E
- Country: Slovenia
- Traditional region: Lower Carniola
- Statistical region: Southeast Slovenia
- Municipality: Kočevje

Area
  - Total: 5.32 km^{2} (2.05 sq mi)
- Elevation: 466.3 m (1,530 ft)

Population (2002)
  - Total: 322
- Postal code: 1330

Mahovnik (pronounced [maˈxoːu̯nik]; in older sources also Mošvald; German: Mooswald, in older sources also Moschwald) is a settlement on the left bank of the Rinža River, immediately northwest of the town of Kočevje in southern Slovenia. The area is part of the traditional region of Lower Carniola and is now included in the Southeast Slovenia Statistical Region.

== History ==
Mahovnik was the first settlement in Gottschee attested in written sources. It was named in a letter from Patriarch Bertram to Count Oton von Ortenburg on 1 September 1339. At the time, it also included the territory of present-day Kočevje, which was still unnamed. In 1574 the settlement had 20 half-farms and one tenant farmer. The settlement was the first point of arrival for Gottschee German settlers in the area in the 14th century. The ethnically German settlers were evicted in 1941, after which the settlement was repopulated by arrivals from other parts of Slovenia.

== Notable people ==
Notable people that were born or lived in Mahovnik include:

- Meta Koren, journalist and translator (1911–?)
