= Rogati Hrib =

- Location in Slovenia
- Coordinates: 45°34′3.66″N 14°53′46.81″E
- Country: Slovenia
- Traditional region: Lower Carniola
- Statistical region: Southeast Slovenia
- Municipality: Kočevje

Area
  - Total: 6.65 km^{2} (2.57 sq mi)
- Elevation: 518.3 m (1,700 ft)

Population (2002)
  - Total: 0
- Postal code: 1338

Rogati Hrib (pronounced [ɾɔˈɡaːti ˈxɾiːp]; German: Hornberg, Gottscheerish: Hoarnparg) is an abandoned settlement in the Municipality of Kočevje in southern Slovenia. The area is part of the traditional region of Lower Carniola and is now included in the Southeast Slovenia Statistical Region.

== Name ==
The Slovene name Rogati Hrib literally means 'prominent/exposed hill' and is semantically equivalent to the German name Hornberg and Gottscheerish name Hoarnparg. Petschauer suggests that the origin of the name may be fanciful, not referring to any particular geographical feature.

== History ==
Rogati Hrib was a Gottschee German village. Petschauer states that it was not mentioned in the land registry of 1574, although it is known to have existed by 1660. However, Savnik states that it is listed in the land registry of 1574, with six full farms divided into 12 half-farms and also two tenant farmers. At Skorten Hill (elevation: 755 meters or 2,477 feet) northeast of the settlement there was a standing guard during the Ottoman wars in Europe responsible for bonfires and warning shots in the event of an Ottoman attack. In 1936 the village had 40 houses and a population of 116. At this time the economy of the village was based on farming, peddling, and hauling timber. There was an inn in the village. During the Second World War its original population was evicted. After the war, the Snežnik company assumed control of the land and used it for pastures.

== Church ==
The local church was a chapel of ease dedicated to Saint Ulrich (Slovene: Sveti Urh). The church stood on a slope above the village and was surrounded by a walled cemetery. The polygonal chancel was walled on three sides and probably rib-vaulted; it was oriented toward the northeast, continuing into a rectangular nave with a wide portico. The church was first mentioned in written sources by Johann Weikhard von Valvasor in 1689, but its architectural features indicate that it dated to at least the beginning of the 17th century. The church's portico and nave shared a shingled roof, and the somewhat lower roof of the chancel was also shingled. There was a bell-cot over the portico with a pointed, shingled roof. The entrance had a pointed-arch door casing. The flat wooden ceiling of the nave was painted, and there was a wooden choir loft at the southwest end with a painted railing. The vaulted chancel had large cracks by the end of the 19th century. The church was demolished soon after 1947.
