= Dolnja Briga =

- Location in Slovenia
- Coordinates: 45°31′20.05″N 14°49′8.3″E
- Country: Slovenia
- Traditional region: Lower Carniola
- Statistical region: Southeast Slovenia
- Municipality: Kočevje

Area
  - Total: 8.39 km^{2} (3.24 sq mi)
- Elevation: 610.6 m (2,003 ft)

Population (2002)
  - Total: 17
- Postal code: 1338

Dolnja Briga (pronounced [ˈdoːlnja ˈbɾiːɡa]; in older sources also Dolenja Briga, German: Niedertiefenbach) is a settlement in the Municipality of Kočevje in southern Slovenia. The area is part of the traditional region of Lower Carniola and is now included in the Southeast Slovenia Statistical Region.

The local church was dedicated to Saint Valentine, but only minor ruins remain of the building, which was removed in 1954. Near the center of the village are the ruins of a school, which was used as a base by the Slovene Partisans until 1944.
