= Vrbovec, Kočevje =

Vrbovec
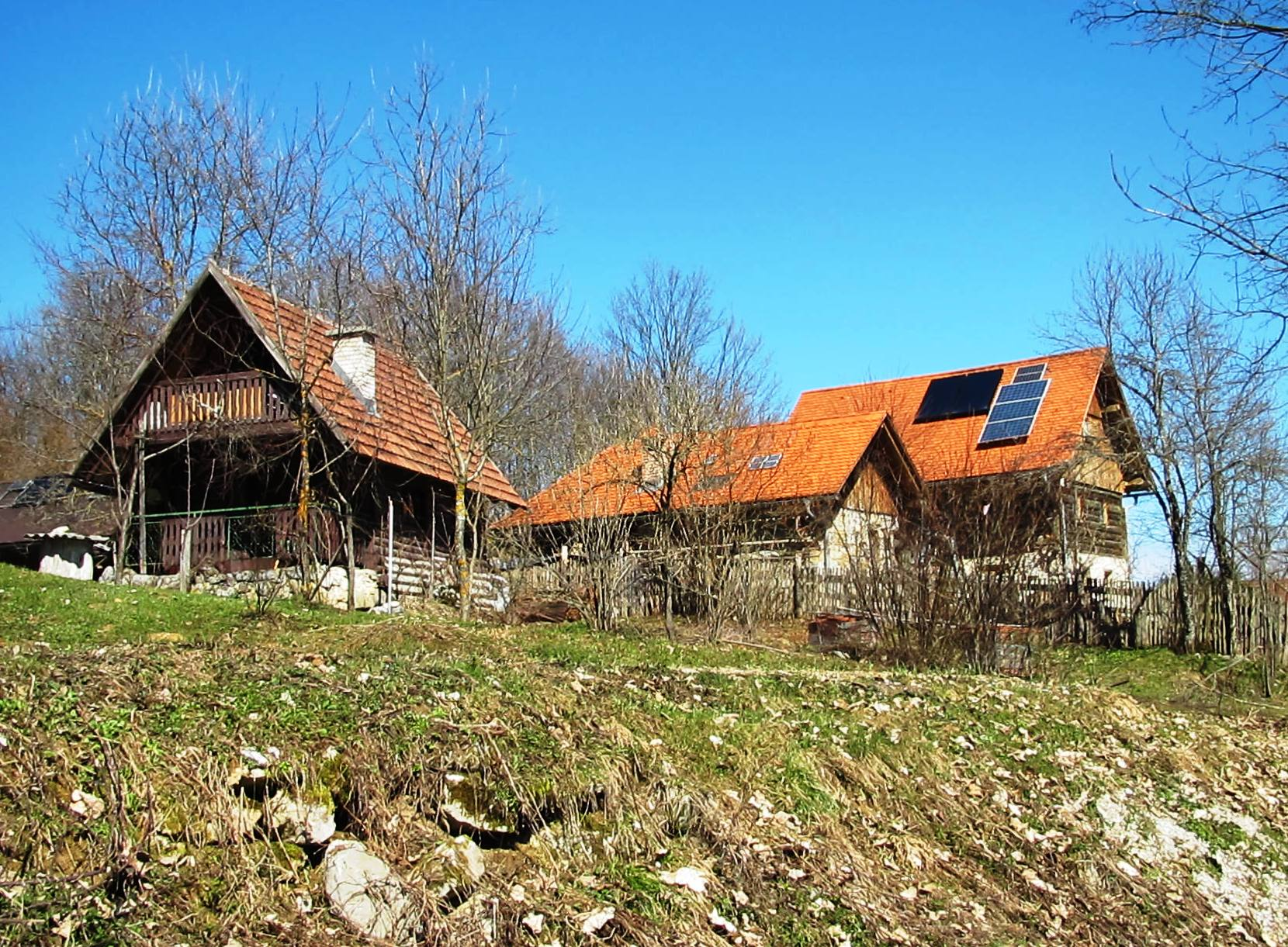

- Location in Slovenia
- Coordinates: 45°43′43.28″N 14°50′25.48″E
- Country: Slovenia
- Traditional region: Lower Carniola
- Statistical region: Southeast Slovenia
- Municipality: Kočevje

Area
  - Total: 2.59 km^{2} (1.00 sq mi)
- Elevation: 555.6 m (1,823 ft)

Population (2002)
  - Total: 0
- Postal code: 1332

Vrbovec (pronounced [ʋəɾˈbɔːʋəts]; in older sources also Verbovic; German: Tiefental or Tiefenthal) is an abandoned settlement in the Municipality of Kočevje in southern Slovenia. It was inhabited by Gottschee Germans. In 1941, during the Second World War, its population was evicted. The area is part of the traditional region of Lower Carniola and is now included in the Southeast Slovenia Statistical Region.

== Church ==
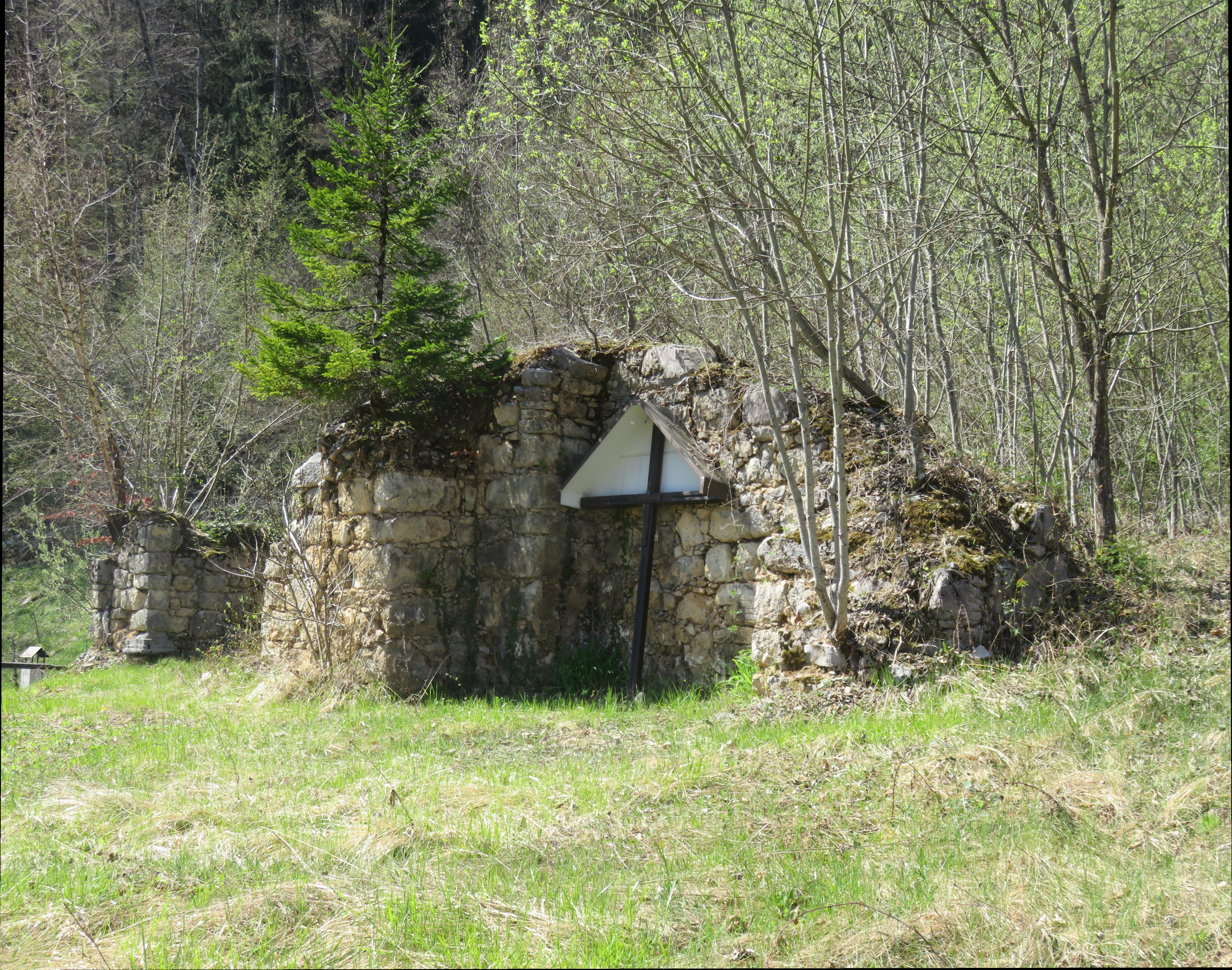
Remnant of Our Lady of the Snows Church

The local church was dedicated to Our Lady of the Snows and was a pilgrimage church. It was demolished in 1951.
