= Griček pri Željnah =

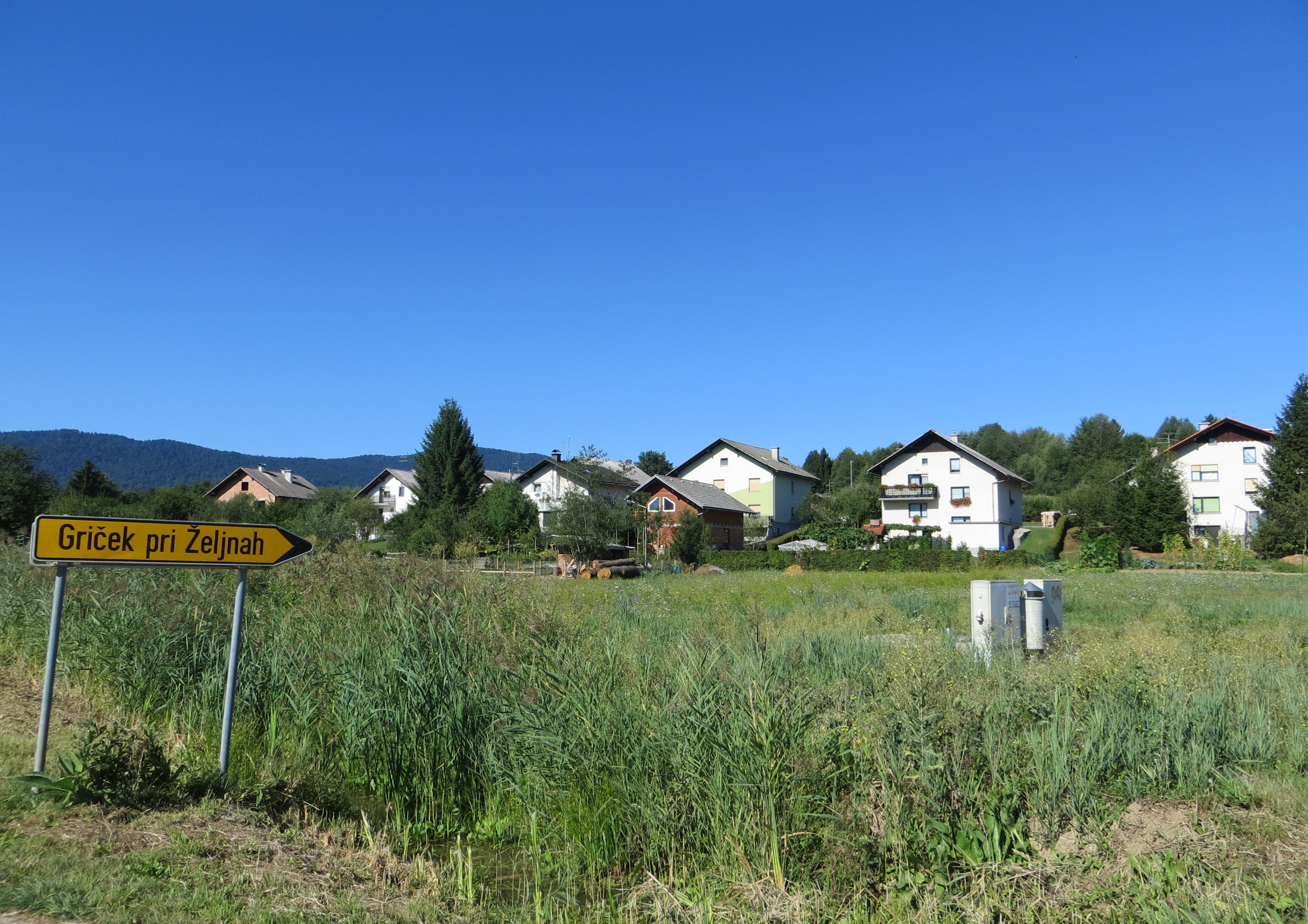

- Location in Slovenia
- Coordinates: 45°39′25.22″N 14°52′46.98″E
- Country: Slovenia
- Traditional region: Lower Carniola
- Statistical region: Southeast Slovenia
- Municipality: Kočevje

Area
  - Total: 0.2 km^{2} (0.077 sq mi)

Population (2013)
  - Total: 67
- Postal code: 1330

Griček pri Željnah (pronounced [ˈɡɾiːtʃək pɾi ˈʒɛːlnax]) is a settlement immediately northeast of the town of Kočevje in southern Slovenia. The area is part of the traditional region of Lower Carniola and is now included in the Southeast Slovenia Statistical Region. The settlement has a Romani population.

== History ==
Griček pri Željnah became an independent settlement in 2000, when it was administratively separated from neighboring Željne.
