= Vrt, Kočevje =

Vrt
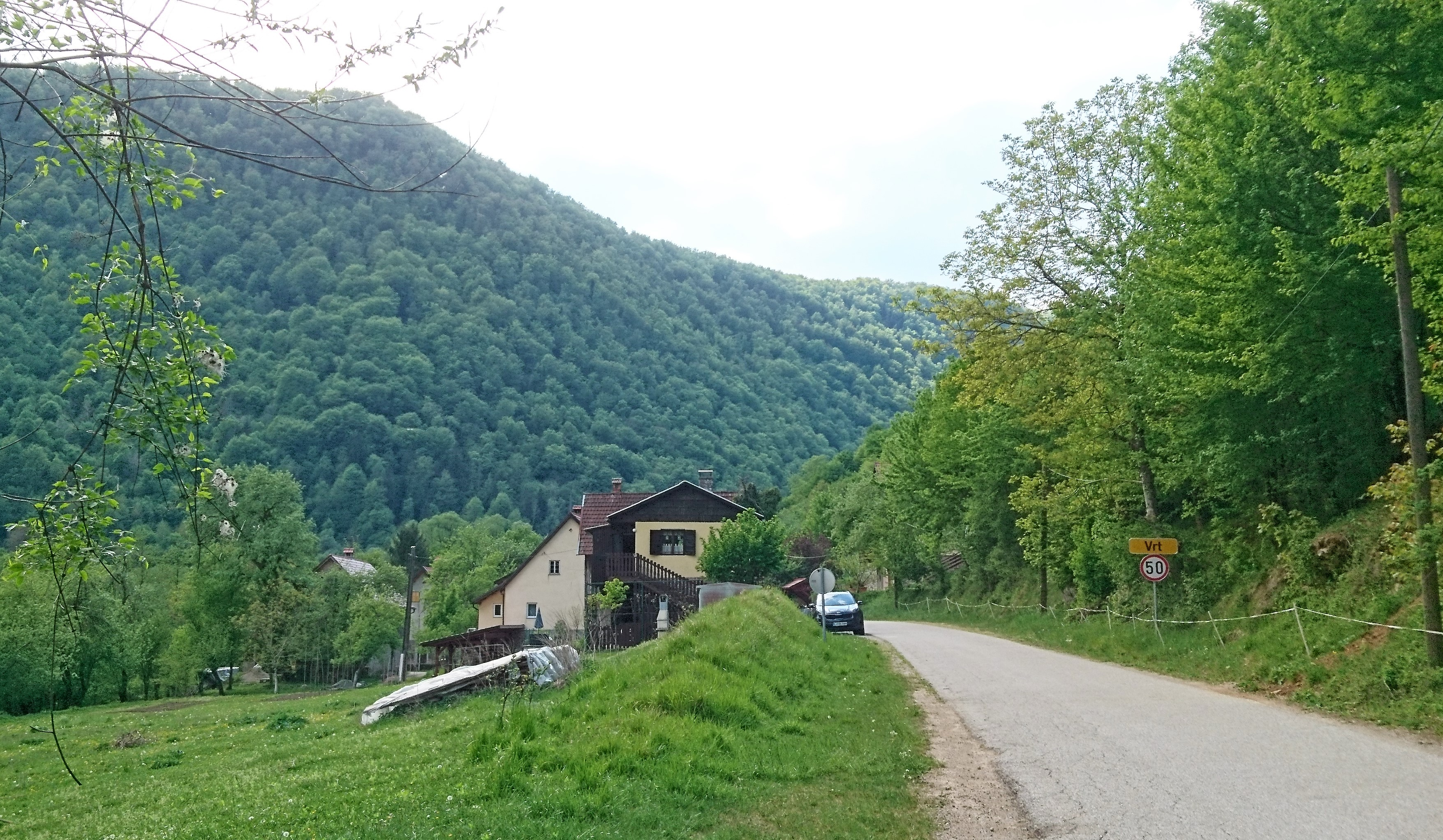

- Location in Slovenia
- Coordinates: 45°29′50.82″N 14°59′31.82″E
- Country: Slovenia
- Traditional region: Lower Carniola
- Statistical region: Southeast Slovenia
- Municipality: Kočevje

Area
  - Total: 1.19 km^{2} (0.46 sq mi)
- Elevation: 210.4 m (690 ft)

Population (2015)
  - Total: 2
- Postal code: 8342

Vrt (pronounced [ˈʋəɾt]; in older sources also Vrd, German: Werth) is a small settlement on the left bank of the Kolpa River in the Municipality of Kočevje in southern Slovenia. It has two permanent inhabitants. The area is part of the traditional region of Lower Carniola and is now included in the Southeast Slovenia Statistical Region.
