= Preža =

- Location in Slovenia
- Coordinates: 45°32′29.10″N 14°49′43.12″E
- Country: Slovenia
- Traditional region: Lower Carniola
- Statistical region: Southeast Slovenia
- Municipality: Kočevje

Area
  - Total: 2.84 km^{2} (1.10 sq mi)
- Elevation: 637 m (2,090 ft)

Population (2012)
  - Total: 0

Preža (pronounced [ˈpɾeːʒa]; in older sources also Preže, German: Pröse) is a village in the Municipality of Kočevje in southern Slovenia. The area is part of the traditional region of Lower Carniola and is now included in the Southeast Slovenia Statistical Region. It no longer has any permanent residents.

== History ==
Preža was a Gottschee German village. In the Kočevje land registry of 1498 the village had four half-farms; the cultivated area gradually increased, so that by 1574 seven half-farms were recorded in the village. Before the Second World War Preža had 16 houses, and three Slovene families also lived in the village. The Southern Lower Carniolan Battalion of the Partisan forces was founded here on 16 April 1942. Italians forces burned the village on 27 April 1942 and killed 11 men from the vicinity that they had brought to the village.

== Church ==
The village church was a chapel of ease dedicated to Saint Joseph. It stood at the northern edge of the village and there was a cemetery south of the church. The church had a rectangular nave with two side chapels and a narrower polygonal chancel walled on three sides. There was a bell-gable extending above the west wall of the church. The church was built around 1637 and was first mentioned in written sources in 1689 by Johann Weikhard von Valvasor. The church was expanded in the mid- to late-18th century. The building had a gabled shingled roof. The church was destroyed in the 1950s and a gravel road was laid in its place.
