= Municipality of Kočevje =

Municipality of Slovenia

Municipality of Kočevje Občina Kočevje
- Municipality
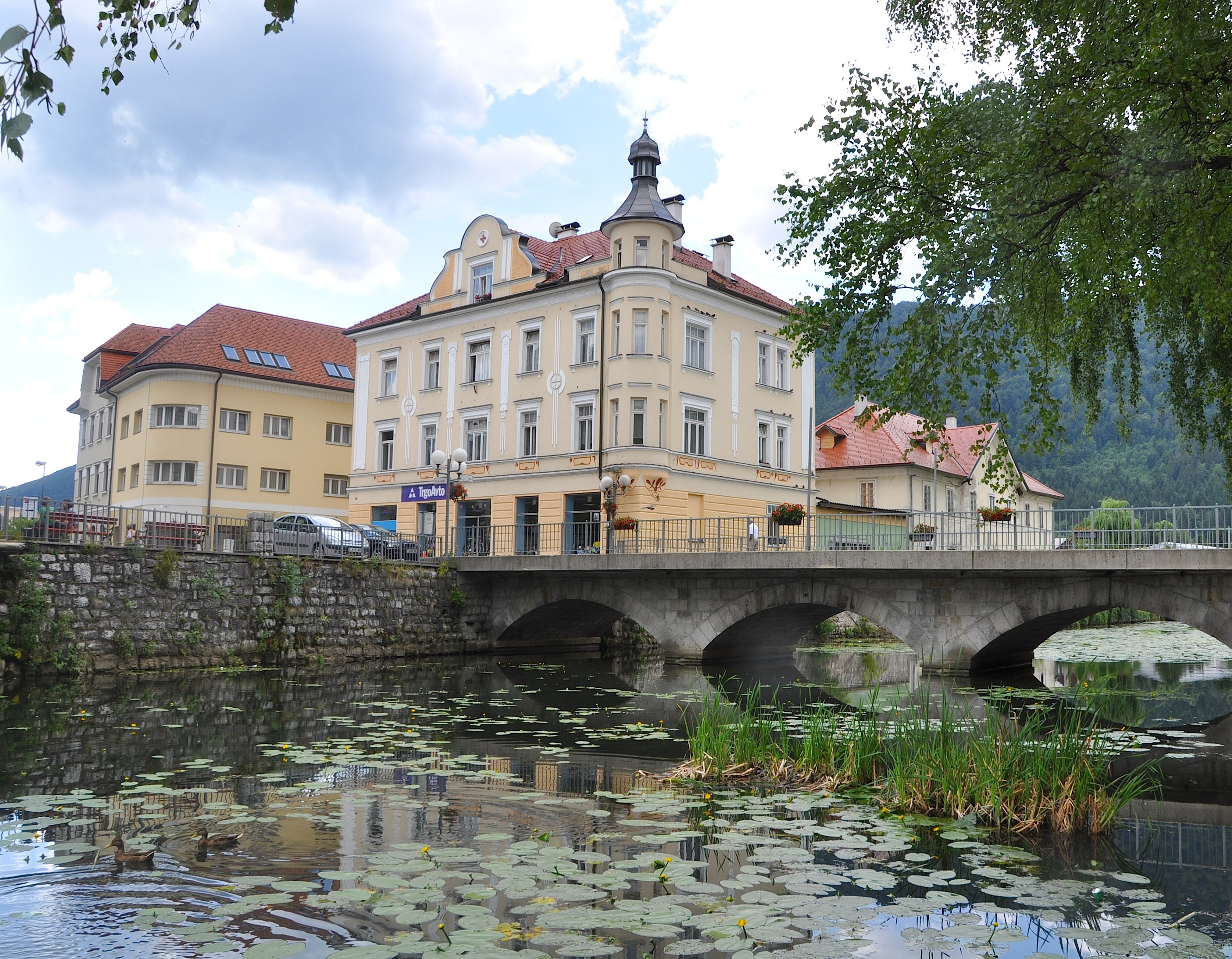

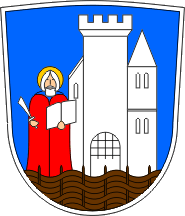
- Coat of arms

- Location of the Municipality of Kočevje in Slovenia
- Coordinates: 46°38′35″N 14°51′34″E
- Country: Slovenia

Government
  - Mayor: Vladimir Prebilič (Prerod)

Area
  - Total: 555 km^{2} (214 sq mi)

Population (2021)
  - Total: 15,644
  - Density: 28.2/km^{2} (73.0/sq mi)
- Time zone: UTC+01 (CET)
  - Summer (DST): UTC+02 (CEST)
- Website: www.kocevje.si

The Municipality of Kočevje (pronounced [kɔˈtʃeːwjɛ]; Slovene: Občina Kočevje) is a municipality in southern Slovenia. The seat of the municipality is the city of Kočevje. Today it is part of the Southeast Slovenia Statistical Region. In terms of area, it is the largest municipality in Slovenia. It borders Croatia.

== History ==
In 1247 Berthold, Patriarch of Aquileia granted the area around Ribnica within the imperial March of Carniola to the Carinthian counts of Ortenburg. When the counts received further estates on the wooded plateau down to Kostel on the Kolpa River in 1336 from Patriarch Bertram, they called for German-speaking settlers from Carinthia and Tyrol. These Germanic people became known as the Gottscheers, and their dialect, Gottscheerish.

The Gottscheers lived in isolation in the Gottschee area, which was variably a county, duchy, and district of the Habsburg Empires. They were primarily subsistence farmers, although Gottscheer men were granted the right to peddle in 1492, with peddling becoming a vital source of income in the impoverished area. The Gottscheer population peaked at 26,000 people in the late 19th century, although emigration to Austria and North America increased due to poverty and, later, discriminatory anti-German policies in the young Kingdom of Yugoslavia. By 1939, only 12,500 Gottscheers remained in Slovenia.

As a part of the National Socialist "Heim ins Reich" policy, Gottscheers were hastily resettled to the Rann Triangle, to the northeast of Gottschee, to make way for Italian settlement in the district. Constantly targeted by the Yugoslav Partisans, the Gottscheers fled Slovenia altogether as Nazi Germany collapsed, and were scattered across Germany, Austria, the United States, and Canada. Partisan activity in the region also thwarted Italian settlement aspirations.

The municipality was the site of the Kočevski Rog massacre in May 1945, part of the massive Bleiburg repatriations. Its victims were Slovenes and other Yugoslavs accused of collaboration with the Germans.

Many of the municipality's ex-German villages were abandoned and razed after the war, and the area was resettled by a geographically diverse group of Slovenians, creating a unique mixed dialect area. The municipality remains sparsely populated, and was the site of several secret military installations in Yugoslav times.

== Settlements ==
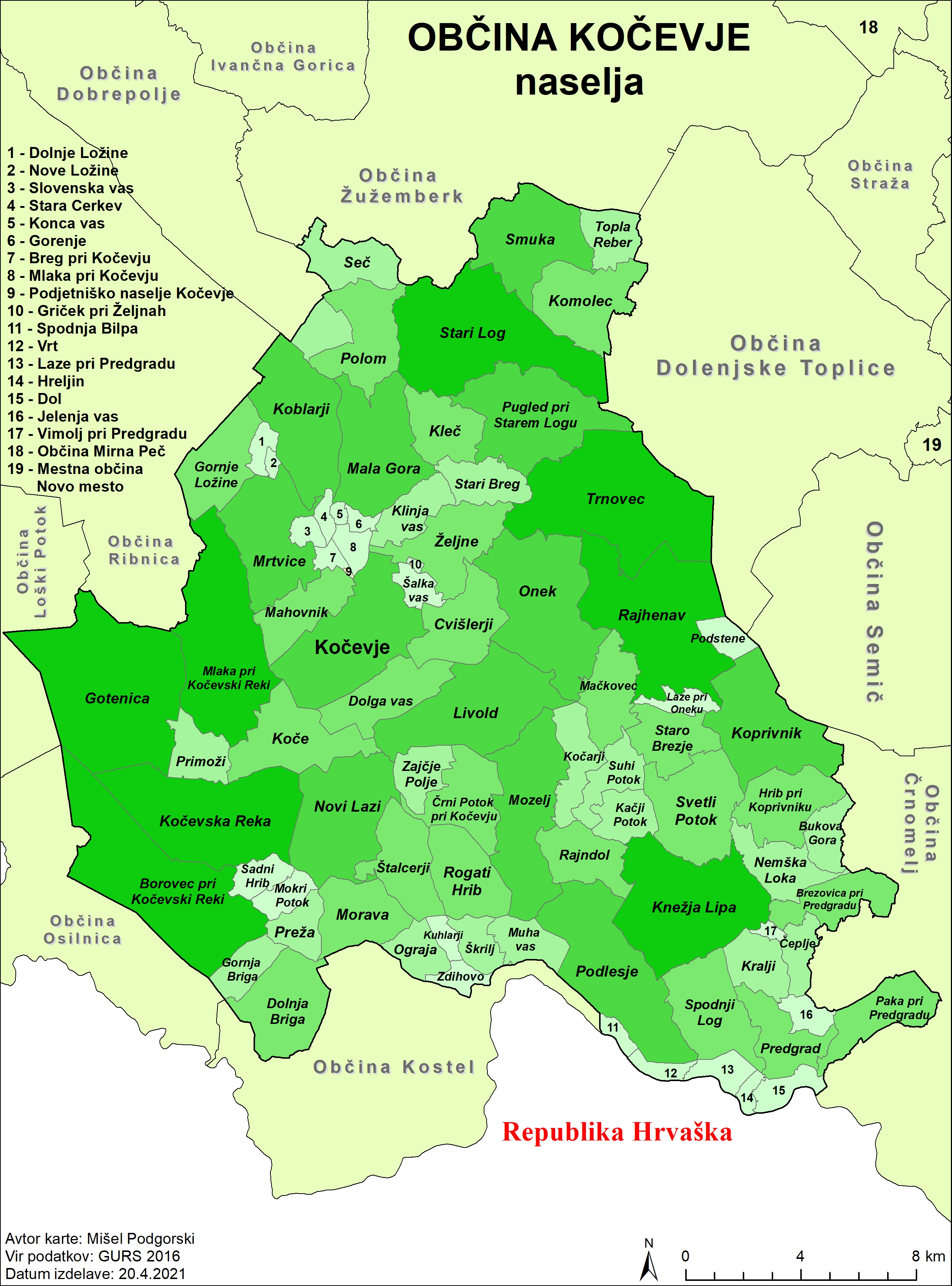
Villages in the municipality

In addition to the municipal seat of Kočevje, the municipality also includes the following settlements:

- Borovec pri Kočevski Reki
- Breg pri Kočevju
- Brezovica pri Predgradu
- Bukova Gora
- Čeplje
- Črni Potok pri Kočevju
- Cvišlerji
- Dol
- Dolga Vas
- Dolnja Briga
- Dolnje Ložine
- Gorenje
- Gornja Briga
- Gornje Ložine
- Gotenica
- Griček pri Željnah
- Hreljin
- Hrib pri Koprivniku
- Jelenja Vas
- Kačji Potok
- Kleč
- Klinja Vas
- Knežja Lipa
- Koblarji
- Kočarji
- Koče
- Kočevska Reka
- Komolec
- Konca Vas
- Koprivnik
- Kralji
- Kuhlarji
- Laze pri Oneku
- Laze pri Predgradu
- Livold
- Mačkovec
- Mahovnik
- Mala Gora
- Mlaka pri Kočevju
- Mlaka pri Kočevski Reki
- Mokri Potok
- Morava
- Mozelj
- Mrtvice
- Muha Vas
- Nemška Loka
- Nove Ložine
- Novi Lazi
- Ograja
- Onek
- Paka pri Predgradu
- Podjetniško Naselje Kočevje
- Podlesje
- Podstene
- Polom
- Predgrad
- Preža
- Primoži
- Pugled pri Starem Logu
- Rajhenav
- Rajndol
- Rogati Hrib
- Sadni Hrib
- Šalka Vas
- Seč
- Škrilj
- Slovenska Vas
- Smuka
- Spodnja Bilpa
- Spodnji Log
- Štalcerji
- Stara Cerkev
- Stari Breg
- Stari Log
- Staro Brezje
- Suhi Potok
- Svetli Potok
- Topla Reber
- Trnovec
- Vimolj pri Predgradu
- Vrbovec
- Vrt
- Zajčje Polje
- Zdihovo
- Željne

== Flag ==
The municipal flag of Kočevje is a tricolor consisting of three equal horizontal bands displaying the colors of Kočevje: blue and white, emblazoned with the coat of arms. The association with the colors blue and white dates to the 1470s, when Emperor Frederick III approved the design of the coat of arms, along with civic rights, on 19 April 1471. The flag during that time varies from the one seen today. The old flag was a bicolor of blue and white, defaced with the coat of arms, which was also different at the time.

== Notable people ==
Notable people that were born or lived in the Municipality of Kočevje include:

- Matej Bor (1913–1993), poet and author
- Milan Butina (1923–1999), academy-trained painter, art teacher, art theorist
- Ivan Jurkovič (born 1952), apostolic nuncio to Russia
- Zofka Kveder (1878–1926), writer
- Viktor Parma (1858–1924), composer
- Roman Erich Petsche (1907–1993), teacher, painter, and Righteous Among the Nations
- Jože Šeško (1908–1942), secondary-school professor, social revolutionary, communist resistance fighter

== Bibliography ==
- Gauß, Karl-Markus (2001). Die sterbenden Europäer. Unterwegs zu den Sepharden von Sarajevo, Gottscheer Deutschen, Arbëreshe, Sorben und Aromunen (in German). Vienna: Zsolnay. ISBN 3-552-05158-9.
- Mitja, Ferenc. "Kočevska, Bleak And Empty".
