= Slovenska Vas, Kočevje =

Slovenska Vas
- Location in Slovenia
- Coordinates: 45°40′1″N 14°49′50″E
- Country: Slovenia
- Traditional region: Lower Carniola
- Statistical region: Southeast Slovenia
- Municipality: Kočevje

Area
  - Total: 1.03 km^{2} (0.40 sq mi)
- Elevation: 472.7 m (1,551 ft)

Population (2002)
  - Total: 234
- Postal code: 1332

Slovenska Vas (pronounced [slɔˈʋeːnska ˈʋaːs]; Slovene: Slovenska vas, German: Windischdorf) is a settlement on the Rinža River west of Stara Cerkev in the Municipality of Kočevje in southern Slovenia. The area is part of the traditional region of Lower Carniola and is now included in the Southeast Slovenia Statistical Region.
