= Podstene, Kočevje =

Podstene
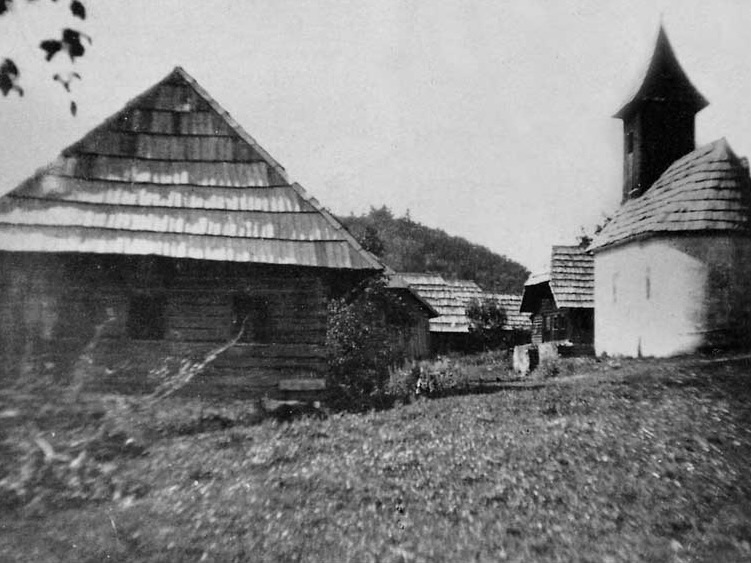

- Location in Slovenia
- Coordinates: 45°37′55.43″N 15°1′15.20″E
- Country: Slovenia
- Traditional region: Lower Carniola
- Statistical region: Southeast Slovenia
- Municipality: Kočevje

Area
  - Total: 1.81 km^{2} (0.70 sq mi)

Population (2012)
  - Total: 0

Podstene (pronounced [pɔtˈsteːnɛ]; German: Untersteinwand or Neubüchel) is a village in the Municipality of Kočevje in southern Slovenia. The area is part of the traditional region of Lower Carniola and is now included in the Southeast Slovenia Statistical Region. It no longer has any permanent residents.

== History ==
Podstene was a Gottschee German village. In 1574 it consisted of four half-farms. There were five houses in the village before the Second World War. The village was burned by Italian troops in the summer of 1942, after which one house remained standing. A family lived in this house until 1967, running a farm and an inn, which was a popular destination for outings.
