= Breg pri Kočevju =

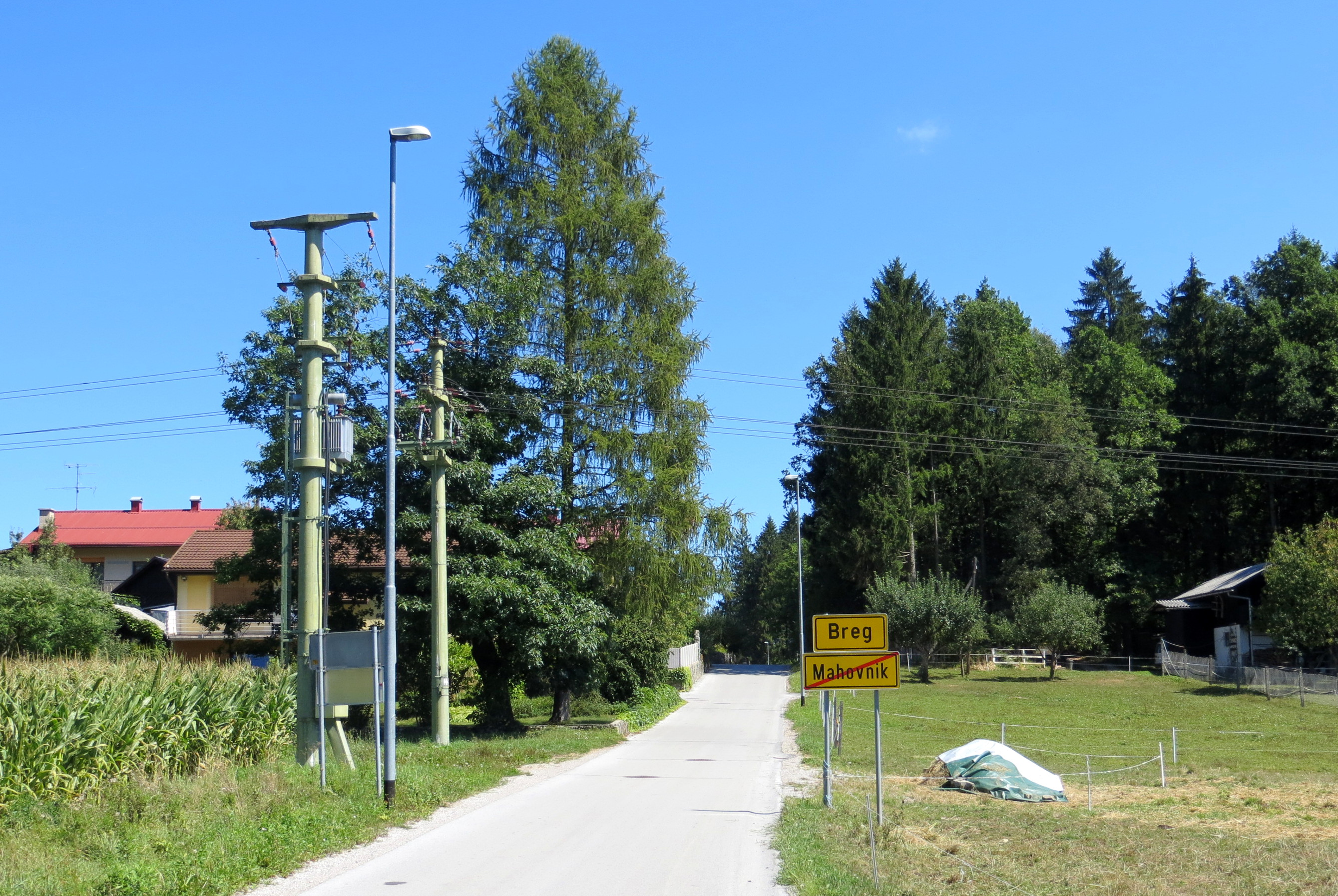

- Location in Slovenia
- Coordinates: 45°39′28.98″N 14°50′14.65″E
- Country: Slovenia
- Traditional region: Lower Carniola
- Statistical region: Southeast Slovenia
- Municipality: Kočevje

Area
  - Total: 0.82 km^{2} (0.32 sq mi)
- Elevation: 465.7 m (1,528 ft)

Population (2002)
  - Total: 336
- Postal code: 1332

Breg pri Kočevju (pronounced [ˈbɾeːk pɾi kɔˈtʃeːu̯ju]; German: Rain) is a settlement on the left bank of the Rinža River north of Kočevje in southern Slovenia. The area is part of the traditional region of Lower Carniola and is now included in the Southeast Slovenia Statistical Region.

== Name ==
Breg pri Kočevju was attested in written sources as Rain in 1494. The German common noun Rain means 'marge; bank' and semantically corresponds to the Slovene name Breg (literally, 'bank'), both referring to the village's location on the bank of the Rinža River. The name of the settlement was changed from Breg to Breg pri Kočevju in 1953.

== Notable people ==
Notable people that were born or lived in Breg pri Kočevju include:

- Ivan Erker (a.k.a. Johann Erker), nom de guerre Goldšmid (1895–1953), Gottschee German communist politician
