= Morava, Kočevje =

Morava
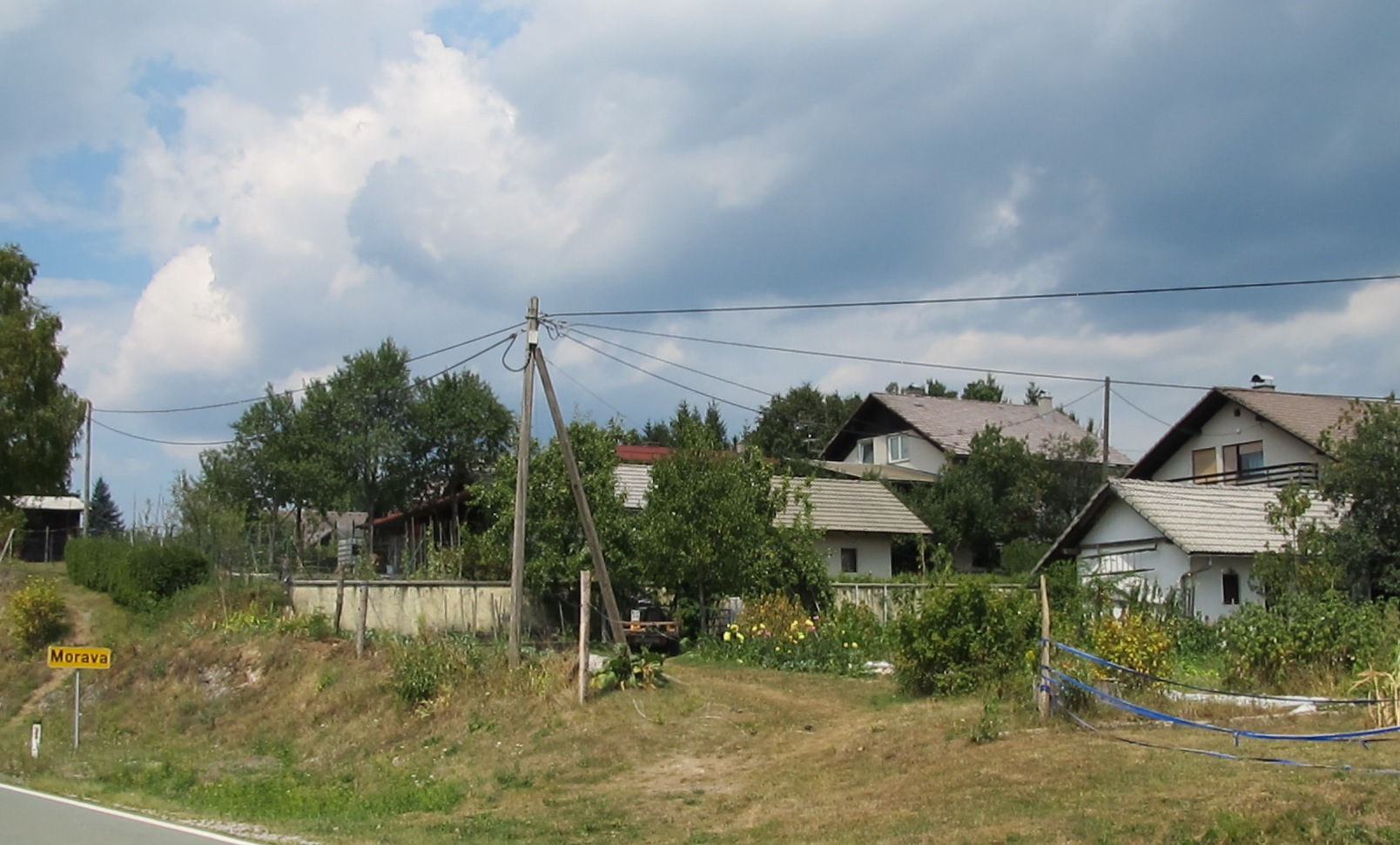
- Morava

- Location in Slovenia
- Coordinates: 45°33′1.98″N 14°51′44.28″E
- Country: Slovenia
- Traditional region: Lower Carniola
- Statistical region: Southeast Slovenia
- Municipality: Kočevje

Area
  - Total: 6.17 km^{2} (2.38 sq mi)
- Elevation: 536.7 m (1,761 ft)

Population (2002)
  - Total: 109
- Postal code: 1338

Morava (pronounced [mɔˈɾaːʋa]; German: Mrauen) is a village in the Municipality of Kočevje in southern Slovenia. It was a village settled by Gottschee Germans. During the Second World War its original population was expelled. The area is part of the traditional region of Lower Carniola and is now included in the Southeast Slovenia Statistical Region. It includes the former hamlet of Mošenik (German: Moschelnik).

== Name ==
Morava was attested in written records in 1498 as Hemoraw. It is believed to be derived from the archaic Slovene common noun *morava '(wet) meadow'. Locally, the village is known as Omrava. The village was known as Mrauen in German in the past.

== Church ==
The local church, dedicated to the Holy Trinity, was a Late Gothic building. A church already stood at the site at least as early as 1674, based on the date carved into the door casing; however, there was probably already a structure at the location by the end of the 15th century. A 1753 visitation report is the first written mention of a church in the village. The church was a single-nave structure with a flat ceiling and a narrower barrel-vaulted octagonal chancel walled on five sides. There was an open portico in front of the entrance. The church was renovated in 1896, and then remodeled and extended in 1902, when a bell tower with a clock was added, replacing the shingled bell-gable and serving as an entry vestibule. After the Second World War, the church continued to serve as the parish church for the Parish of Kočevska Reka. The church was dynamited in 1955 and the ruins were razed in 1956.
