= Laze pri Predgradu =

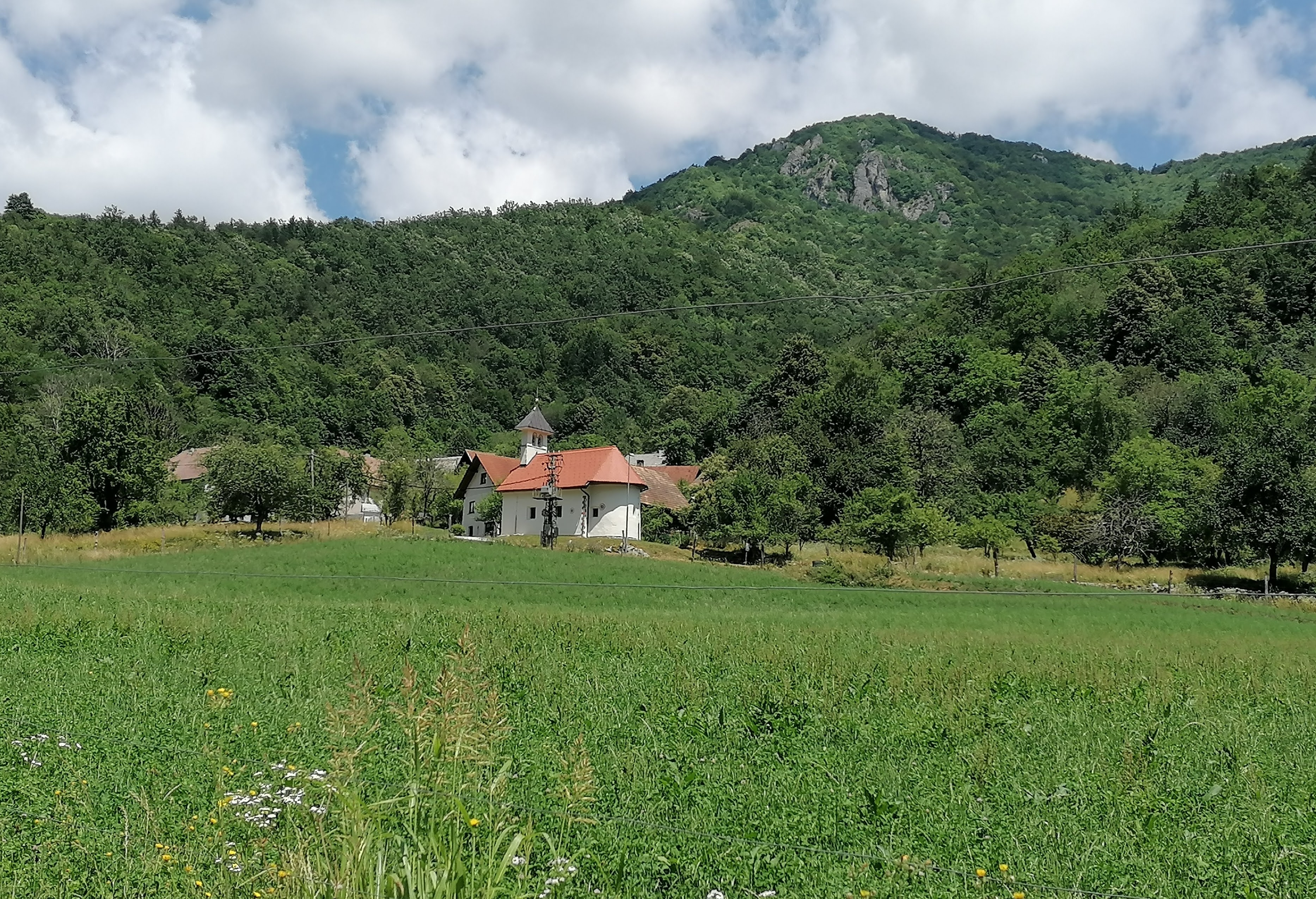

- Location in Slovenia
- Coordinates: 45°29′48.22″N 15°1′3.03″E
- Country: Slovenia
- Traditional region: Lower Carniola
- Statistical region: Southeast Slovenia
- Municipality: Kočevje

Area
  - Total: 1.98 km^{2} (0.76 sq mi)
- Elevation: 245.7 m (806 ft)

Population (2002)
  - Total: 10
- Postal code: 8342

Laze pri Predgradu (pronounced [ˈláːzɛ pɾi ˈpɾéːdɡɾadu]; German: Geräuth) is a settlement on the left bank of the Kolpa River in the Municipality of Kočevje in southern Slovenia. The area is part of the traditional region of Lower Carniola and is now included in the Southeast Slovenia Statistical Region.

== Name ==
The name of the settlement was changed from Laze to Laze pri Predgradu in 1955. In the past the German name was Geräuth.

== Church ==
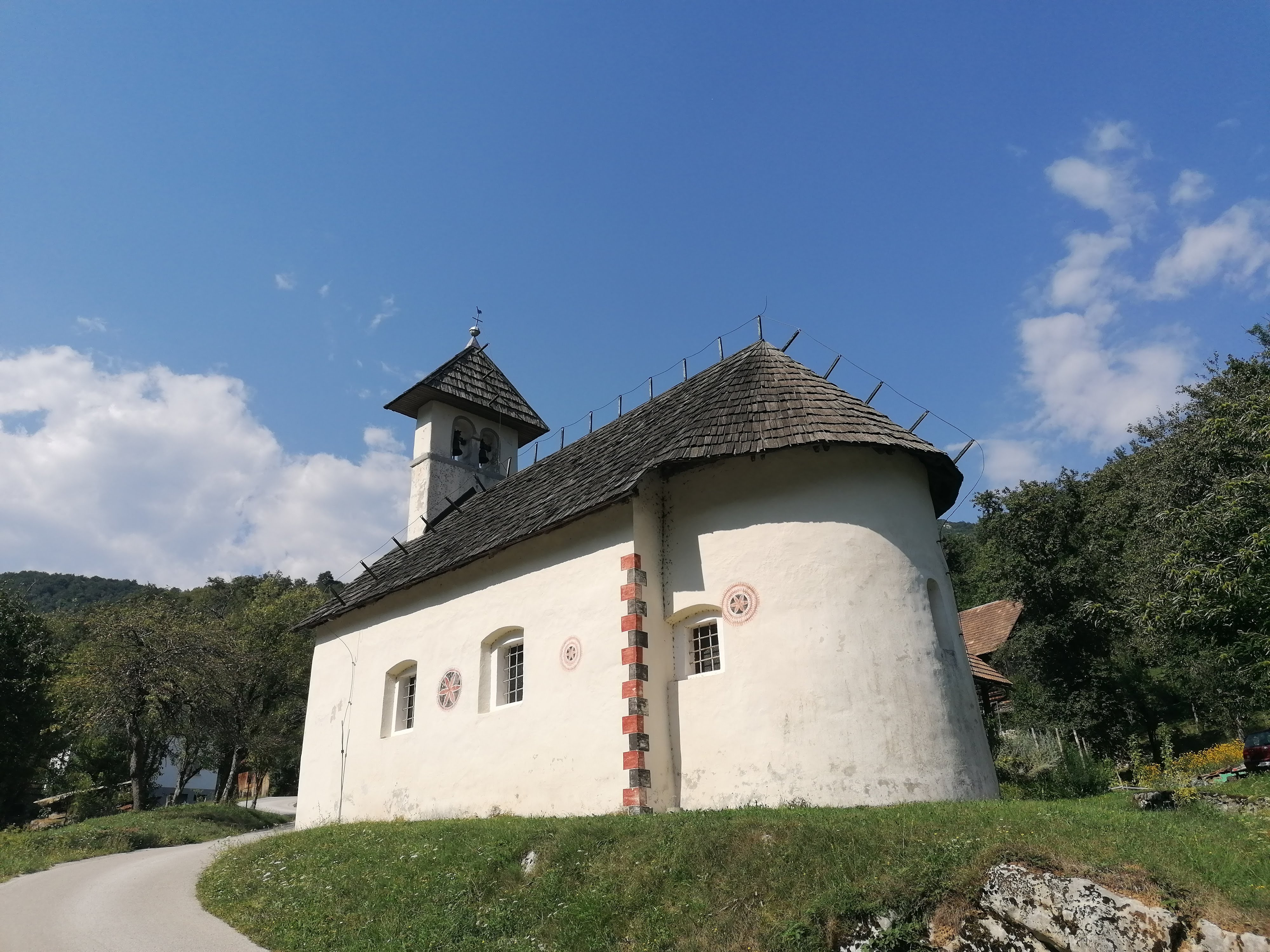
St. Vitus's Church

The local church is dedicated to Saint Vitus and belongs to the Parish of Stari Trg ob Kolpi. It is a late Romanesque single-naved building with a rounded apse and a belfry that was greatly rebuilt and refurbished over the centuries.
