= Sadni Hrib =

- Location in Slovenia
- Coordinates: 45°33′24.42″N 14°48′55.91″E
- Country: Slovenia
- Traditional region: Lower Carniola
- Statistical region: Southeast Slovenia
- Municipality: Kočevje

Area
  - Total: 2.12 km^{2} (0.82 sq mi)

Population (2012)
  - Total: 0

Sadni Hrib (pronounced [ˈsaːdni ˈxriːp]; earlier Zgornji Vecenbah, Zgornji Vencenbah, or Gornji Vecenbah, German: Oberwetzenbach) is a village in the Municipality of Kočevje in southern Slovenia. The area is part of the traditional region of Lower Carniola and is now included in the Southeast Slovenia Statistical Region. It no longer has any permanent residents.

== History ==
Sadni Hrib was a Gottschee German village. Before the Second World War it had 13 houses. The village was not destroyed during the war. Only three houses remained in the village in 1953, and the last inhabitants left in 1958.
