= Staro Brezje =

- Location in Slovenia
- Coordinates: 45°36′1.41″N 14°59′48.39″E
- Country: Slovenia
- Traditional region: Lower Carniola
- Statistical region: Southeast Slovenia
- Municipality: Kočevje

Area
  - Total: 5.14 km^{2} (1.98 sq mi)
- Elevation: 814.5 m (2,672 ft)

Population (2002)
  - Total: 4
- Postal code: 1330

Staro Brezje (pronounced [ˈstaːɾɔ ˈbɾeːzjɛ]; German: Altfriesach, Gottscheerish: Wriəshoch) is a settlement in the hills east of the town of Kočevje in southern Slovenia. The area is part of the traditional region of Lower Carniola and is now included in the Southeast Slovenia Statistical Region.

== Name ==
The name Staro Brezje literally means 'old birch grove'. The name Brezje is shared with several other places in Slovenia and is derived from the word brezje 'birch grove'. Both the standard German name Altfriesach (prefixed with Alt- 'old') and the unprefixed Gottscheerish name Wriəshoch are derived from Slovene breza 'birch', brezje 'birch grove'.

== History ==
Staro Brezje was a village inhabited by Gottschee Germans. According to the land registry of 1574, the village had four full farms divided into eight half-farms, with a population of about 60. There were 20 houses in the village in 1770. The production of loden fabric began in the village in 1850. The village was greatly damaged by a fire in 1882, and several houses were destroyed in another fire in 1898. There were 17 houses, all inhabited by Gottschee Germans, before the Second World War. The original population was evicted in 1941. On 20 December 1942, Italian forces discovered the Partisan committee for the Koprivnik zone in one of the houses, after which they killed six people and burned the village.

== Church ==
The local church, dedicated to the Assumption of Mary, originally dated from the late 16th or early 17th century. It had a bell gable initially dedicated to Saint Thomas, and then later to Saint Wolfgang. The church was mentioned in the 17th century by Johann Weikhard von Valvasor. The church was damaged in the fire of 1882. The new main altar, dating to 1887, featured a wooden sculpture of the Virgin Mary. The church survived the Second World War, but was demolished in 1955.
