= Zdihovo, Kočevje =

Zdihovo
- Location in Slovenia
- Coordinates: 45°31′38.23″N 14°54′12.88″E
- Country: Slovenia
- Traditional region: Lower Carniola
- Statistical region: Southeast Slovenia
- Municipality: Kočevje

Area
  - Total: 1.39 km^{2} (0.54 sq mi)
- Elevation: 641 m (2,103 ft)

Population (2002)
  - Total: 0
- Postal code: 1338

Zdihovo (pronounced [ˈzdiːxɔʋɔ]; German: Oberskrill) is an abandoned settlement in the Municipality of Kočevje in southern Slovenia. It was inhabited by Gottschee Germans. At the start of the Second World War its original population was expelled. The area is part of the traditional region of Lower Carniola and is now included in the Southeast Slovenia Statistical Region.

The local church was dedicated to Our Lady of Sorrows and was a Baroque pilgrimage church built in 1702. It was demolished in 1954.
