= Kostel dialect =

Slovene dialect spoken in Upper Kupa Valley

- kȯsˈteːu̯skȯ naˈrėːčje
- Pronunciation: [kʊ͈sˈteːu̯skʊ͈ naˈrɪ͈t͡ʃjɛ]
- Native to: Slovenia, Croatia
- Region: Kupa Valley near Kostel and Brod na Kupi
- Ethnicity: Slovenes, Croats
- Language family: Indo-European: Balto-Slavic; Slavic; South Slavic; Western South Slavic; Slovene; Lower Carniolan; Kostel dialect

Language codes
- ISO 639-3: –
- Kostel dialect

The Kostel dialect (Slovene: kostelsko narečje [kɔsˈtéwskɔ naˈɾéːt͡ʃjɛ], kostelska belokranjščina, kostelščina; Serbo-Croatian: kostelsko narječje), in Croatian literature also eastern microdialects of Western Goran subdialect (Serbo-Croatian: zapadni goranski poddijalekt, zapadni gorskokotarski poddijalekt, Slovene: zahodni goranski govori, zahodni gorskokotarski govori), is a dialect spoken along the Kupa Valley in Slovenia and Croatia, around Banja Loka and Brod na Kupi. The dialect originates from Alpine Slavic, a predecessor of modern Slovene, but speakers living in Croatia self-identify as speaking Croatian. The dialect borders the Mixed Kočevje subdialects to the north, the Southern White Carniolan and Eastern Goran dialect to the east, the Čabranka dialect to the west, and the Goran dialects to the south and east, as well Shtokavian, which is spoken in Moravice and neighboring villages. The dialect belongs to the Lower Carniolan dialect group, and it evolved from the Lower Carniolan dialect base. Until recently, the neighboring Čabranka dialect was considered part of the Kostel dialect, but it was later discovered that both dialects had evolved separately but are in process of becoming more similar to each other.

== Geographical distribution ==
The Kostel dialect is spoken in Croatia, but the northernmost part extends into southern Slovenia. It extends from Kuželj and Gornji Turni in the west, south to Ravna Gora, as far east as Razdrto, and north to Banja Loka and Kostel. It is the southernmost Slovene dialect. Notable settlements include Kuželj, Guče Selo, Brod na Kupi, Krivac, Gornji Turni, Kupjak, Ravna Gora, Skrad, Brod Moravice, Lokvica, and Šimatovo in Croatia, and Vas, Fara, Kuželj, and Potok in Slovenia.

The border between the Kostel dialect, South White Carniolan dialect, and Mixed Kočevje subdialects is somewhat unclear, and the Kostel dialect may also extend down the Kupa River on the Slovene side.

== Accentual changes ==
The Kostel dialect lost the difference between high- and low-pitched accent on both long and short vowels, which are still differentiated. It also underwent three accent shifts: the *ženȁ → *žèna, *məglȁ → *mə̀gla, *sěnȏ / *prosȏ → *sě̀no / *pròso, *visȍk → vìsok, and *kováč → *kòvač accent shift.

== Phonology ==
Almost all vowels have monophthongized, which sets this dialect apart from all other Lower Carniolan dialects.

- Non-final *ě̀ and *ě̄ are pronounced as ẹː or ėː.
- The vowel *ō is pronounced as ọː or ȯː.
- Non-final *è and ē, as well as non-final *ę̀ and ę̄, are pronounced as i̯ẹː or ẹː.
- Similarly, non-final *ò and ǫ̀, as well as ǭ, are pronounced as u̯ọː or ọː.
- Newly stressed *e and *o after the ženȁ → žèna shift were mostly simplified into eː and oː, or ḙː and o̭ː, respectively.
- Non-final *ə̀ and *ə̄ turned into aː.
- Non-final *à and *ā turned into aː.
- Non-final *ì and *ī became iː.
- Non-final *ù and *ū became üː.
- Non-final *l̥̀ and *l̥̄ evolved into long or short u.
- Non-final *r̥̀ and *r̥̄ mostly evolved into ər, but some microdialects still pronounce them as r̥.

Akanye is not particularly common, but ukanye is, turning word-final o into ȯ or u. Unstressed *u is reduced into e̥, ė, ü, or i. Unstressed *ə evolved into a. The Banja Loka and Delač microdialects also have unstressed long vowels, which became unstressed after accent shifts.

Word-final *m mostly turned into *n. Palatal *ĺ and *ń have not depalatalized. If a word started with u then v appeared before it, and if a word started with a then j appeared before it. However, the dialect lost j before i at the beginning of words. Alpine Slovene *w evolved into non-sonorant v, which devoices if at the end of a word or before a non-voiced consonant. The clusters ṷm- and ṷb- simplified into xm- and xb-, respectively. Other consonant simplifications also occurred, such as tl- → kl-.

== Morphology ==
Dual forms were fully replaced by plural forms. The future and preterit tenses are formed using the l-participle.

== Vocabulary ==
The priest and Slavic specialist Jože Gregorič collected almost 17,000 words spoken in the Slovene part of the Kostel dialect, from Srobotnik to Grgelj, which is currently still listed as belonging to the Mixed Kočevje subdialects, and he published a dictionary of the Kostel dialect.

== Bibliography ==
- Gostenčnik, Januška (2018). Krajevni govori ob Čabranki in zgornji Kolpi (in Slovenian). Ljubljana: Založba ZRC. ISBN 978-961-05-0081-0.
- Gostenčnik, Januška (2020). Kostelsko narečje. Slavistična revija (in Slovenian). Ljubljana: Znanstvenoraziskovalni center SAZU.
- Ramovš, Fran (1935). Historična gramatika slovenskega jezika [Historical grammar of the Sloene language]. VII. Dialekti (in Slovenian). Ljubljana: Znanstveno društvo za humanistične vede v Ljubljani.
- Šekli, Matej (2018). Legan Ravnikar, Andreja (ed.). Topologija lingvogenez slovanskih jezikov. Collection Linguistica et philologica (in Slovenian). Translated by Plotnikova, Anastasija. Ljubljana: Znanstvenoraziskovalni center SAZU. ISBN 978-961-05-0137-4.
