= Kuželič =

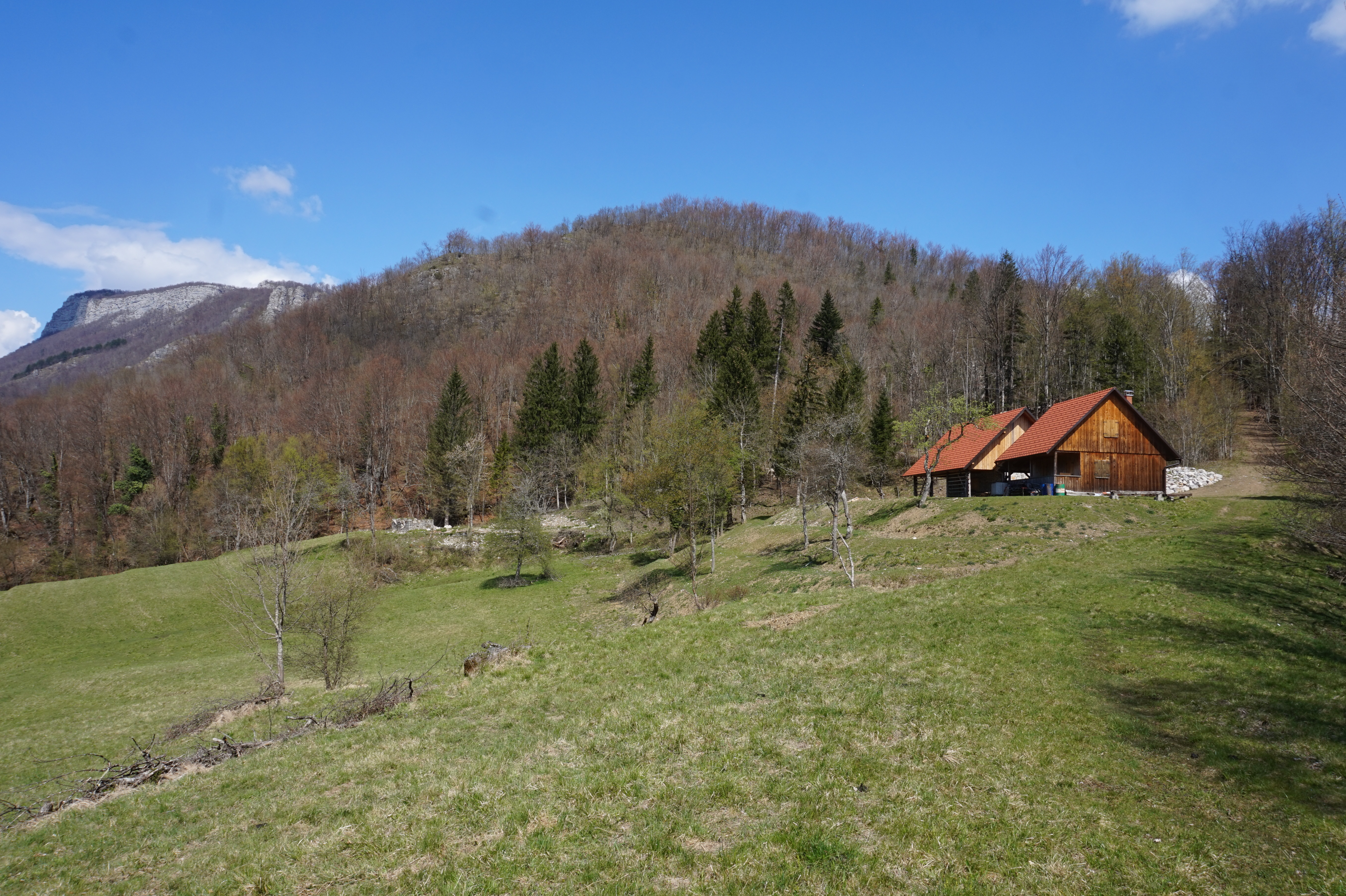

- Location in Slovenia
- Coordinates: 45°28′15.82″N 14°50′49.83″E
- Country: Slovenia
- Traditional region: Lower Carniola
- Statistical region: Southeast Slovenia
- Municipality: Kostel

Area
  - Total: 0.5 km^{2} (0.19 sq mi)
- Elevation: 375 m (1,230 ft)

Population (2015)
  - Total: 0

Kuželič (pronounced [kuˈʒeːlitʃ]) is a small uninhabited settlement west of Vas in the Municipality of Kostel in southern Slovenia. The area is part of the traditional region of Lower Carniola and is now included in the Southeast Slovenia Statistical Region.

== History ==
Kuželič consisted of a single half-hide farm in the land register of 1575.

The village was burned by Italian forces in March 1942, and the population was taken away and imprisoned in reprisal for a Partisan attack. The stones from the burned houses were used to build a bunker on the hill that controlled the area between Petrinja and Brod na Kupi. In 1943, an engagement with German forces in the area resulted in the deaths of several Partisans.

After the war, the former villagers settled in Pirče and Vas, returning regularly to cultivate their fields and harvest their orchards.
