= Srobotnik =

Srobotnik may refer to several places in Slovenia:

- Srobotnik, Dolenjske Toplice, a former settlement in the Municipality of Dolenjske Toplice
- Srobotnik ob Kolpi, a settlement in the Municipality of Kostel
- Srobotnik pri Velikih Laščah, a settlement in the Municipality of Velike Lašče
