= Podstene =

Podstene may refer to:

Slovenia

- Podstene, Kočevje, a village near Kočevje
- Podstene pri Kostelu, a village near Kostel

Croatia

- Podstene, Čabar, a village near Čabar
- Podstene, Brod Moravice, a village near Brod Moravice
