= Jesenov Vrt =

- Location in Slovenia
- Coordinates: 45°30′40.01″N 14°50′35.05″E
- Country: Slovenia
- Traditional region: Lower Carniola
- Statistical region: Southeast Slovenia
- Municipality: Kostel

Area
  - Total: 1.33 km^{2} (0.51 sq mi)
- Elevation: 606.1 m (1,989 ft)

Population (2002)
  - Total: 0
- Postal code: 1338

Jesenov Vrt (pronounced [jɛˈseːnɔu̯ ˈʋəɾt], in older sources also Jesenovrt, German: Jesenwerch) is an abandoned settlement in the Municipality of Kostel in southern Slovenia. The area is part of the traditional region of Lower Carniola and is now included in the Southeast Slovenia Statistical Region. Locally, the village is known as Senov Vrt.

== Geography ==
Jesenov Vrt is a compact village on a hill west of Banja Loka, accessible by local roads. Gully Spring (Slovene: Pri žlebu) was used for drinking water and laundering in the past.

== Name ==
Locally, the name Jesenov Vrt has been reduced via apheresis to Senovrt.

== History ==
Jesenov Vrt consisted of two full-sized farms in the land registry of 1570. In the 1900 census it had a population of 48 people living in twelve houses. Water mains were installed in 1956 using three pipes, one of which filled a concrete trough at Katra Spring. By 1953 the population had declined to 42 people living in 10 houses, and by 1961 it had further declined to 25 people in eight houses. At that time, five houses were built of wood and had wooden shingles. The people traditionally made a living through agriculture and day labor.
