= Dren, Kostel =

Dren
- Location in Slovenia
- Coordinates: 45°29′46.77″N 14°53′49.12″E
- Country: Slovenia
- Traditional region: Lower Carniola
- Statistical region: Southeast Slovenia
- Municipality: Kostel

Area
  - Total: 0.72 km^{2} (0.28 sq mi)
- Elevation: 427.7 m (1,403 ft)

Population (2002)
  - Total: 21
- Postal code: 1336

Dren (pronounced [ˈdɾeːn]) is a small settlement in the hills above the left bank of the Kolpa River southwest of Kostel in southern Slovenia. The area is part of the traditional region of Lower Carniola and is now included in the Southeast Slovenia Statistical Region.
