= Grivac =

Grivac may refer to:

- Grivac, Kostel, Slovenia
- Grivac (Knić), Serbia
