= Zapuže pri Kostelu =

- Location in Slovenia
- Coordinates: 45°30′53.18″N 14°53′50.84″E
- Country: Slovenia
- Traditional region: Lower Carniola
- Statistical region: Southeast Slovenia
- Municipality: Kostel

Area
  - Total: 0.48 km^{2} (0.19 sq mi)
- Elevation: 343.1 m (1,126 ft)

Population (2002)
  - Total: 5
- Postal code: 1336

Zapuže pri Kostelu (pronounced [ˈzaːpuʒɛ pɾi kɔˈsteːlu]) is a small settlement northwest of Kostel in southern Slovenia. The area is part of the traditional region of Lower Carniola and is now included in the Southeast Slovenia Statistical Region.

== Name ==
The name of the settlement was changed from Zapuže to Zapuže pri Kostelu in 1953.
