= Planina, Kostel =

Planina
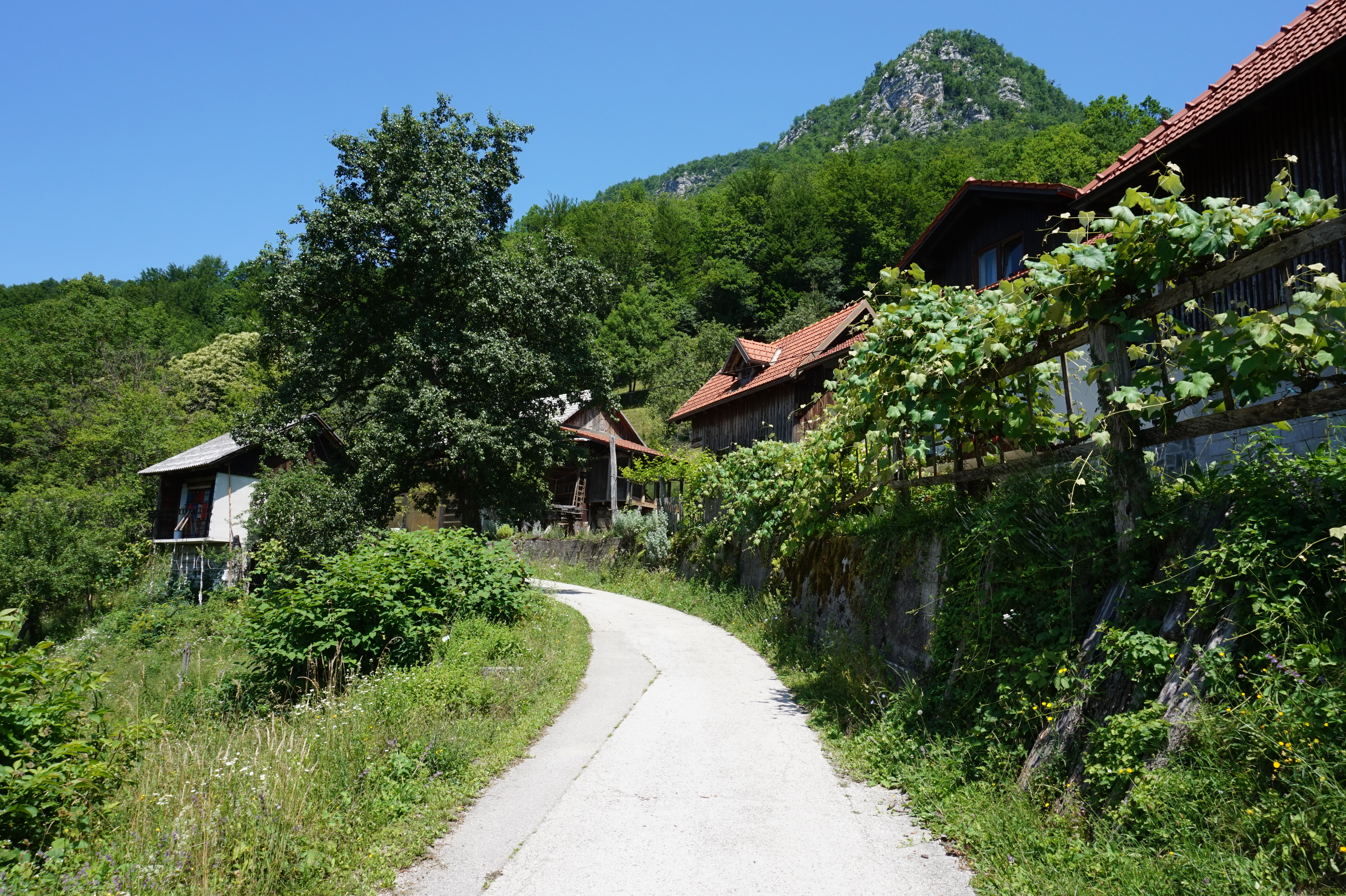

- Location in Slovenia
- Coordinates: 45°28′52.87″N 14°51′47.64″E
- Country: Slovenia
- Traditional region: Lower Carniola
- Statistical region: Southeast Slovenia
- Municipality: Kostel

Area
  - Total: 1.7 km^{2} (0.66 sq mi)
- Elevation: 353.4 m (1,159 ft)

Population (2002)
  - Total: 13
- Postal code: 1336

Planina (pronounced [plaˈnìːna]) is a settlement in the hills west of Fara in the Municipality of Kostel in southern Slovenia. The area is part of the traditional region of Lower Carniola and is now included in the Southeast Slovenia Statistical Region.

== Name ==
Planina was attested in historical sources as Alben in 1494; compare German Alben for Planina (Postojna), and Gottschee German Aobə for Planina (Semič). The Slovenian name of the settlement is derived from the common noun planina 'treeless mountain; mountain pasture', referring to the local geography and semantically corresponding to Middle High German albe in the medieval attestation of the name.
