= Padovo =

Padovo may refer to two places in Slovenia:

- Padovo pri Fari, a settlement in the Municipality of Kostel
- Padovo pri Osilnici, a settlement in the Municipality of Osilnica
