= Delač =

Delač may refer to:

- Delač, Slovenia, a village in Slovenia
- Matej Delač, Croatian footballer
- Mario Delač, Croatian swimmer
