= Laze pri Kostelu =

- Location in Slovenia
- Coordinates: 45°28′27.09″N 14°49′27.73″E
- Country: Slovenia
- Traditional region: Lower Carniola
- Statistical region: Southeast Slovenia
- Municipality: Kostel

Area
  - Total: 2.46 km^{2} (0.95 sq mi)
- Elevation: 307.8 m (1,010 ft)

Population (2002)
  - Total: 13
- Postal code: 1336

Laze pri Kostelu (pronounced [ˈlaːzɛ pɾi kɔˈsteːlu]) is a small settlement in the Municipality of Kostel in southern Slovenia. It lies in a small valley east of Kuželj. The area is part of the traditional region of Lower Carniola and is now included in the Southeast Slovenia Statistical Region.

== Name ==
The name of the settlement was changed from Laze to Laze pri Kostelu in 1955.
