= Tišenpolj =

- Location in Slovenia
- Coordinates: 45°29′10.78″N 14°53′6.81″E
- Country: Slovenia
- Traditional region: Lower Carniola
- Statistical region: Southeast Slovenia
- Municipality: Kostel

Area
  - Total: 0.74 km^{2} (0.29 sq mi)
- Elevation: 368.1 m (1,208 ft)

Population (2013)
  - Total: 1
- Postal code: 1336

Tišenpolj (pronounced [ˈtiːʃɛmpɔl]) is a small settlement in the hills north of Fara in the Municipality of Kostel in southern Slovenia. It has one permanent resident. The area is part of the traditional region of Lower Carniola and is now included in the Southeast Slovenia Statistical Region.
