= Nova Sela, Kostel =

Nova Sela
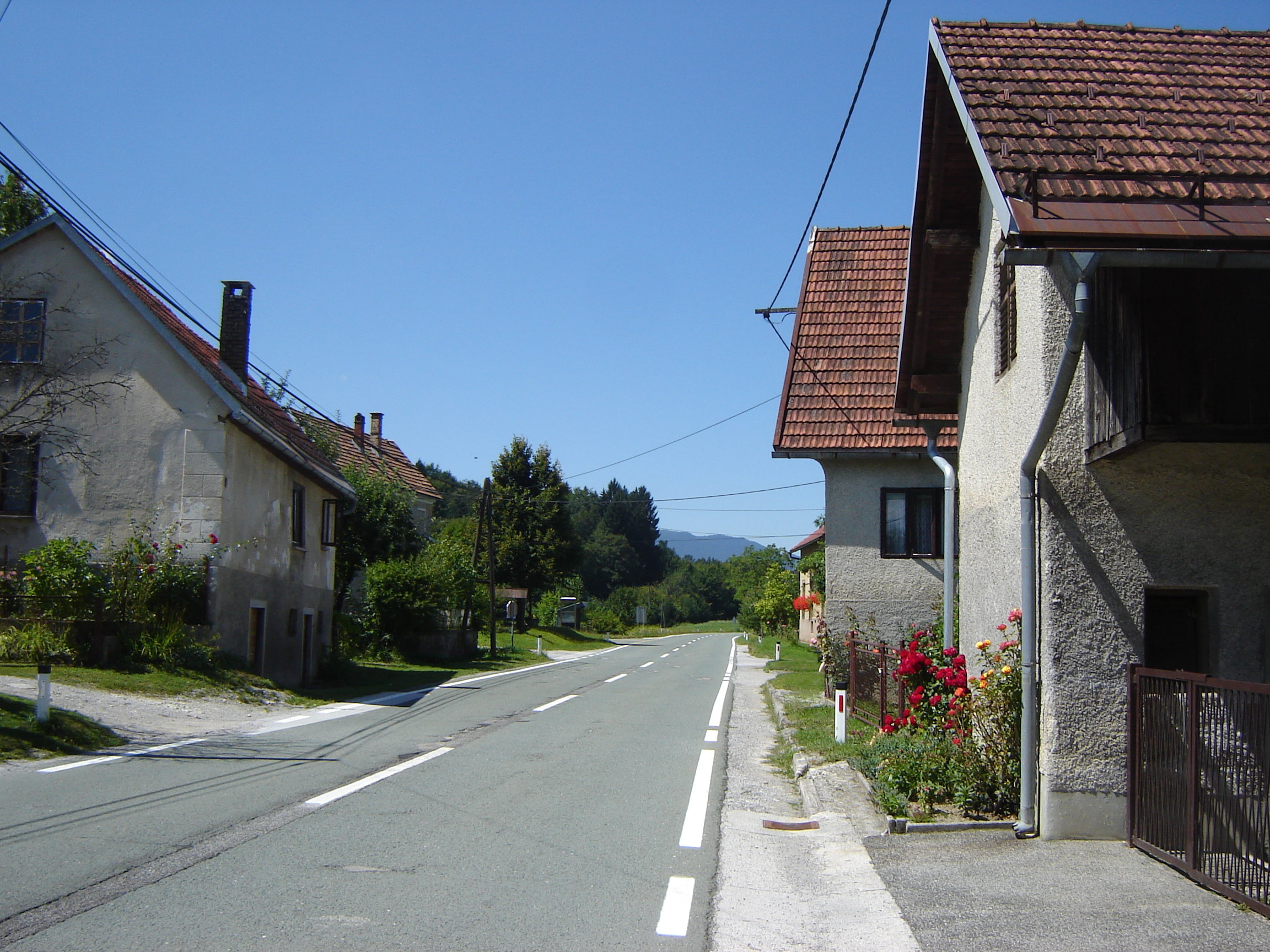
- Nova Sela

- Location in Slovenia
- Coordinates: 45°30′20″N 14°53′17″E
- Country: Slovenia
- Traditional region: Lower Carniola
- Statistical region: Southeast Slovenia
- Municipality: Kostel

Area
  - Total: 2.52 km^{2} (0.97 sq mi)
- Elevation: 543.2 m (1,782 ft)

Population (2002)
  - Total: 35
- Postal code: 1336

Nova Sela (pronounced [ˈnɔːʋa ˈseːla]; Slovene: Nova sela) is a settlement southeast of Banja Loka in the Municipality of Kostel in southern Slovenia. The area is part of the traditional region of Lower Carniola and is now included in the Southeast Slovenia Statistical Region.
