= Lipovec pri Kostelu =

- Location in Slovenia
- Coordinates: 45°30′36.01″N 14°53′44.88″E
- Country: Slovenia
- Traditional region: Lower Carniola
- Statistical region: Southeast Slovenia
- Municipality: Kostel

Area
  - Total: 0.3 km^{2} (0.12 sq mi)
- Elevation: 370.5 m (1,216 ft)

Population (2017)
  - Total: 3
- Postal code: 1336

Lipovec pri Kostelu (pronounced [ˈliːpɔʋəts pɾi kɔˈsteːlu]) is a small remote settlement west of Kostel in southern Slovenia. The area is part of the traditional region of Lower Carniola and is now included in the Southeast Slovenia Statistical Region.

== Name ==
The name of the settlement was changed from Lipovec to Lipovec pri Kostelu in 1955.
