= Selo pri Kostelu =

- Location in Slovenia
- Coordinates: 45°30′48.31″N 14°53′34.72″E
- Country: Slovenia
- Traditional region: Lower Carniola
- Statistical region: Southeast Slovenia
- Municipality: Kostel

Area
  - Total: 0.49 km^{2} (0.19 sq mi)
- Elevation: 411.8 m (1,351 ft)
- Postal code: 1336

Selo pri Kostelu (pronounced [ˈsɛːlɔ pɾi kɔˈsteːlu]) is a small settlement west of Kostel in southern Slovenia. It lies in the traditional region of Lower Carniola and is now included in the Southeast Slovenia Statistical Region.

== Name ==
The name of the settlement was changed from Selo to Selo pri Kostelu in 1953.
