= Stelnik =

- Location in Slovenia
- Coordinates: 45°30′21.45″N 14°54′11.17″E
- Country: Slovenia
- Traditional region: Lower Carniola
- Statistical region: Southeast Slovenia
- Municipality: Kostel

Area
  - Total: 0.27 km^{2} (0.10 sq mi)
- Elevation: 327 m (1,073 ft)
- Postal code: 1336

Stelnik (pronounced [ˈsteu̯ːnik]) is a small settlement immediately southwest of Kostel in southern Slovenia. The area is part of the traditional region of Lower Carniola and is now included in the Southeast Slovenia Statistical Region.
