= Krkovo =

Krkovo may refer to:

Slovenia

- Krkovo pri Karlovici, a settlement in the Municipality of Velike Lašče
- Krkovo nad Faro, a settlement in the Municipality of Kostel
