= Jaksici =

Jaksici may refer to:

- Jakšić family (pl. Jakšići), Serbian nobility from the 15th and 16th century
- Jakšići, Primorje-Gorski Kotar County, a village near Vrbovsko, Croatia
- Jakšići, a former name of Jakšić, Požega-Slavonia County, a village near Požega, Croatia
- Jakšići, a hamlet of Cerova (Krupanj), a village in Serbia
- Jakšići, a hamlet of Panjak, Užice, a village near Užice, Serbia
- Jakšići, a hamlet of Glogovo, a village near Gračac, Zadar County, Croatia
- Donji Jakšići and Gornji Jakšići, hamlets of Sokolac, Šipovo near Šipovo, Bosnia and Herzegovina
- Jakšiči, a village near Kostel, Slovenia
