= Dolenja Žaga =

- Location in Slovenia
- Coordinates: 45°30′51.11″N 14°54′43.95″E
- Country: Slovenia
- Traditional region: Lower Carniola
- Statistical region: Southeast Slovenia
- Municipality: Kostel

Area
  - Total: 0.2 km^{2} (0.077 sq mi)
- Elevation: 207 m (679 ft)

Population (2012)
  - Total: 0

Dolenja Žaga (pronounced [dɔˈleːnja ˈʒaːɡa]; in older sources also Spodnja Žaga, German: Unterschaga) is an abandoned settlement on the left bank of the Kolpa River north of Kostel in southern Slovenia. The area is part of the traditional region of Lower Carniola and is now included in the Southeast Slovenia Statistical Region. It includes the hamlets of Lobič, Na Rebri, and Trsje.

== Geography ==
Mare Cave (Slovene: Kobilina jama) lies in a canyon towards the hamlet of Lobič. During heavy rains it discharges water into the Kolpa River. There were formerly vineyards in the hamlets of Na Rebri and Trsje, but these were abandoned by the former Gottschee German residents of the village.

== Name ==
The name Dolenja Žaga and the variant name Spodnja Žaga literally mean 'lower sawmill'. The settlement is named after a former sawmill and grain mill that were abandoned a few years before the First World War. Today no traces of the mills remain. The village was known as Unterschaga in 19th-century German.

== History ==
The main settlement in the village has been uninhabited since 1958, when the resident of the last inhabited house in the village died, and her daughter sold the property to the Banjaloka collective farm (Slovene: KZ Banjaloka) and then moved away to Zagreb. The hamlet of Lobič has been uninhabited since 1962, when the homeowner died. The hamlet of Na Rebri formerly had two houses; one was burned by Italian forces in 1942, and the other was razed in 1963 after the owners moved away to Ograja. There was still one resident living in the hamlet of Trsje in 1971.
