= Gorenja Žaga =

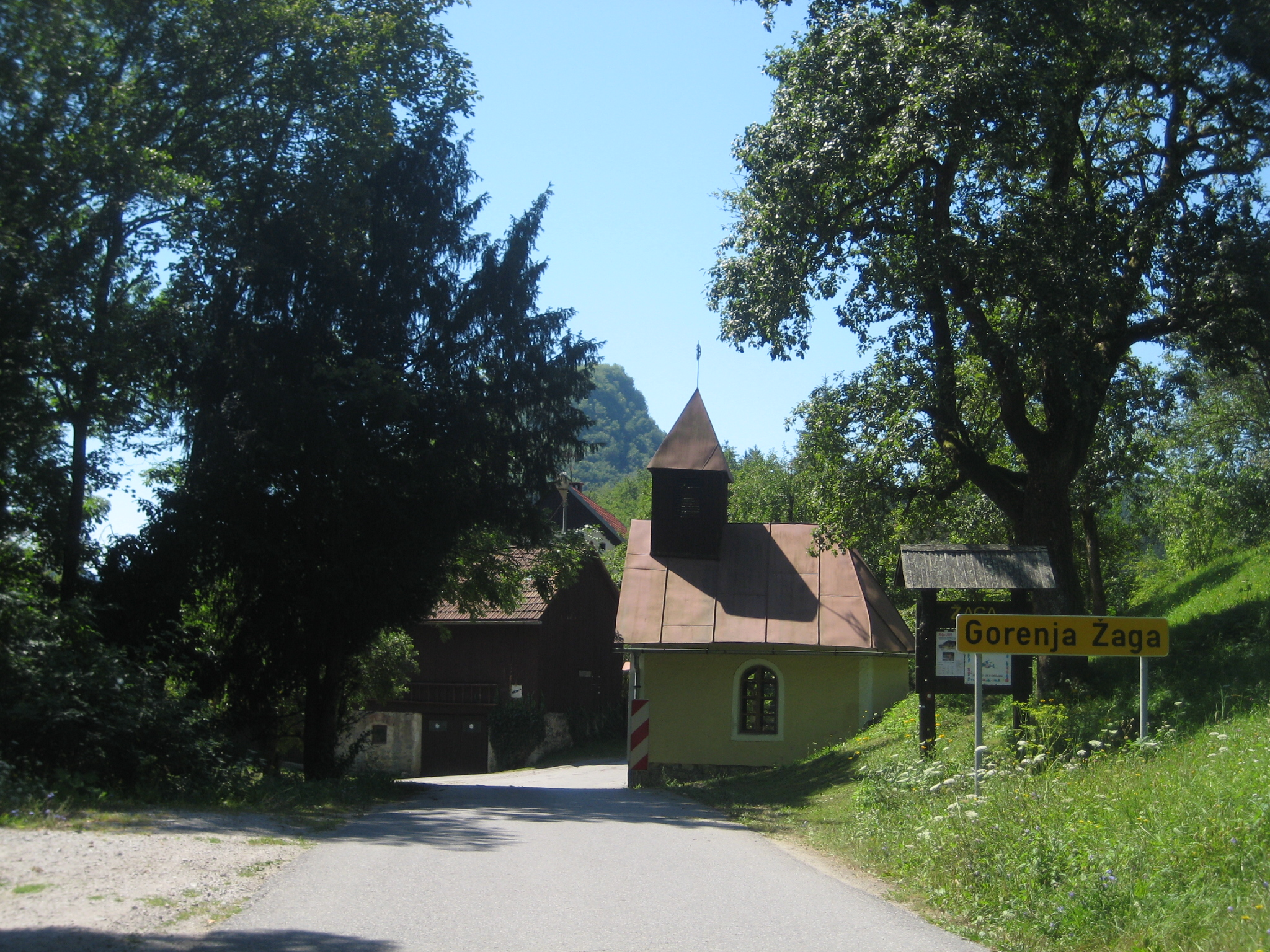

- Location in Slovenia
- Coordinates: 45°31′3.26″N 14°54′35.98″E
- Country: Slovenia
- Traditional region: Lower Carniola
- Statistical region: Southeast Slovenia
- Municipality: Kostel

Area
  - Total: 1.54 km^{2} (0.59 sq mi)
- Elevation: 248.8 m (816 ft)

Population (2002)
  - Total: 12
- Postal code: 1336

Gorenja Žaga (pronounced [ɡɔˈɾeːnja ˈʒaːɡa]; German: Oberschaga) is a small settlement on the left bank of the Kolpa River north of Kostel in southern Slovenia. The area is part of the traditional region of Lower Carniola and is now included in the Southeast Slovenia Statistical Region.
