= Kuželj =

Kuželj may refer to:

- Kuželj, Kostel, a village in Slovenia
- Kuželj, Croatia, a village near Delnice
