= Kaptol =

Kaptol can refer to:

- Kaptol, Zagreb, a part of Zagreb, Croatia
- Kaptol, Požega-Slavonia County, a municipality in Požega-Slavonia County, Croatia
- Kaptol, Kostel, a settlement in the Municipality of Kostel, Slovenia
