= Srednji Potok =

- Location in Slovenia
- Coordinates: 45°31′19.07″N 14°52′48.17″E
- Country: Slovenia
- Traditional region: Lower Carniola
- Statistical region: Southeast Slovenia
- Municipality: Kostel

Area
  - Total: 0.35 km^{2} (0.14 sq mi)
- Elevation: 324.6 m (1,065 ft)

Population (2002)
  - Total: 0
- Postal code: 1336

Srednji Potok (pronounced [ˈsɾeːdnji ˈpɔːtɔk]; German: Mitterpotok) is a small settlement in the valley of Potok Creek, a minor tributary of the Kolpa River, in the Municipality of Kostel in southern Slovenia. The area is part of the traditional region of Lower Carniola and is now included in the Southeast Slovenia Statistical Region.
