= Slavski Laz =

- Location in Slovenia
- Coordinates: 45°28′53.68″N 14°54′24.21″E
- Country: Slovenia
- Traditional region: Lower Carniola
- Statistical region: Southeast Slovenia
- Municipality: Kostel

Area
  - Total: 0.95 km^{2} (0.37 sq mi)
- Elevation: 222.6 m (730 ft)

Population (2002)
  - Total: 13
- Postal code: 1336

Slavski Laz (pronounced [ˈslaːu̯ski ˈlas]; German: Slauskilas) is a village on the left bank of the Kolpa River in the Municipality of Kostel in southern Slovenia. The area is part of the traditional region of Lower Carniola and is now included in the Southeast Slovenia Statistical Region.

The local church, built on a small elevation outside the village to the northeast, is dedicated to the Holy Trinity (Slovene: Sveta Trojica). It dates to the 17th century.
