= Municipality of Kostel =

Municipality of Slovenia

Municipality of Kostel Občina Kostel
- Municipality
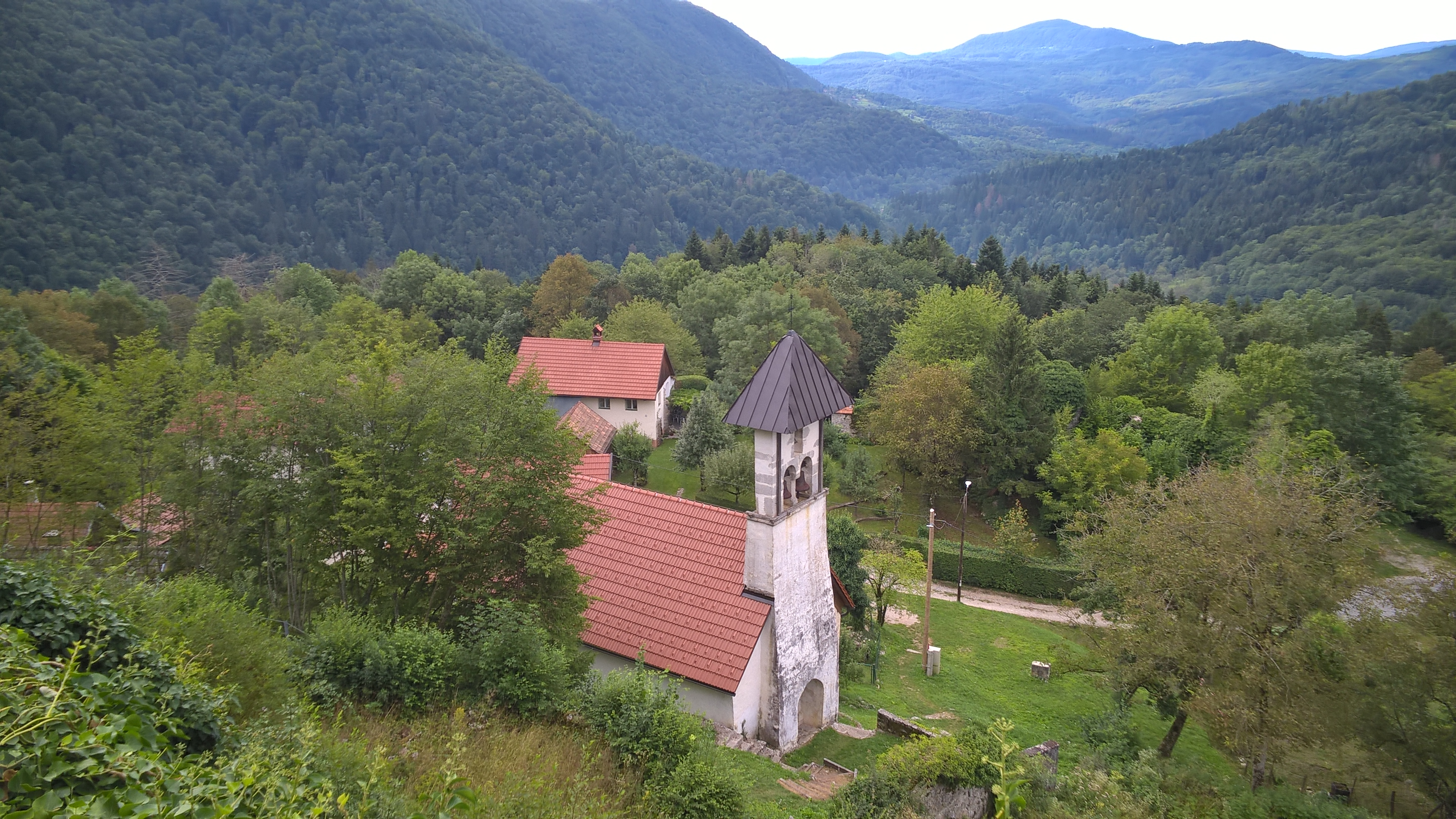

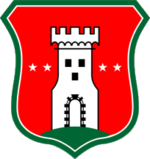
- Coat of arms

- Location of the Municipality of Kostel in Slovenia
- Coordinates: 45°30′31.84″N 14°54′36.03″E
- Country: Slovenia

Government
  - Mayor: Nataša Turk (Independent)

Area
  - Total: 56.09 km^{2} (21.66 sq mi)

Population (2018)
  - Total: 637
  - Density: 11.4/km^{2} (29.4/sq mi)
- Time zone: UTC+01 (CET)
  - Summer (DST): UTC+02 (CEST)
- Postal code: 1336
- Website: www.kostel.si

The Municipality of Kostel (pronounced [ˈkɔːstɛu̯]; Slovene: Občina Kostel) is a municipality in southern Slovenia. Its seat is the settlement of Vas. It is part of the traditional region of Lower Carniola and is now included in the Southeast Slovenia Statistical Region. It borders Croatia.

== Settlements ==
In addition to the municipal seat of Vas, the municipality also includes the following settlements:

1. Ajbelj
2. Banja Loka
3. Briga
4. Brsnik
5. Colnarji
6. Delač
7. Dolenja Žaga
8. Dolenji Potok
9. Dren
10. Drežnik
11. Fara
12. Gladloka
13. Gorenja Žaga
14. Gorenji Potok
15. Gotenc
16. Grgelj
17. Grivac
18. Hrib pri Fari
19. Jakšiči
20. Jesenov Vrt
21. Kaptol
22. Kostel
23. Krkovo nad Faro
24. Kuželič
25. Kuželj
26. Laze pri Kostelu
27. Lipovec pri Kostelu
28. Mavrc
29. Nova Sela
30. Oskrt
31. Padovo pri Fari
32. Petrina
33. Pirče
34. Planina
35. Poden
36. Podstene pri Kostelu
37. Potok
38. Puc
39. Rajšele
40. Rake
41. Sapnik
42. Selo pri Kostelu
43. Slavski Laz
44. Srednji Potok
45. Srobotnik ob Kolpi
46. Štajer
47. Stelnik
48. Stružnica
49. Suhor
50. Tišenpolj
51. Vimolj
52. Vrh pri Fari
53. Zapuže pri Kostelu
