= Sapnik =

- Location in Slovenia
- Coordinates: 45°29′40.34″N 14°54′51.31″E
- Country: Slovenia
- Traditional region: Lower Carniola
- Statistical region: Southeast Slovenia
- Municipality: Kostel

Area
  - Total: 0.58 km^{2} (0.22 sq mi)
- Elevation: 233.9 m (767 ft)

Population (2002)
  - Total: 8
- Postal code: 1336

Sapnik (pronounced [ˈsaːpnik]) is a settlement on the left bank of the Kolpa River in the Municipality of Kostel in southern Slovenia. It lies in the traditional region of Lower Carniola and is now included in the Southeast Slovenia Statistical Region.
