= Delač, Kostel =

Delač
- Location in Slovenia
- Coordinates: 45°30′11.39″N 14°53′42.62″E
- Country: Slovenia
- Traditional region: Lower Carniola
- Statistical region: Southeast Slovenia
- Municipality: Municipality of Kostel

Area
  - Total: 0.35 km^{2} (0.14 sq mi)
- Elevation: 424.4 m (1,392 ft)

Population (2002)
  - Total: 0
- Postal code: 1336

Delač (pronounced [dɛˈlaːtʃ] or [ˈdeːlatʃ]; German: Delatsch) is a small settlement southwest of Kostel in southern Slovenia. The area is part of the traditional region of Lower Carniola and is now included in the Southeast Slovenia Statistical Region.
