= Gladloka =

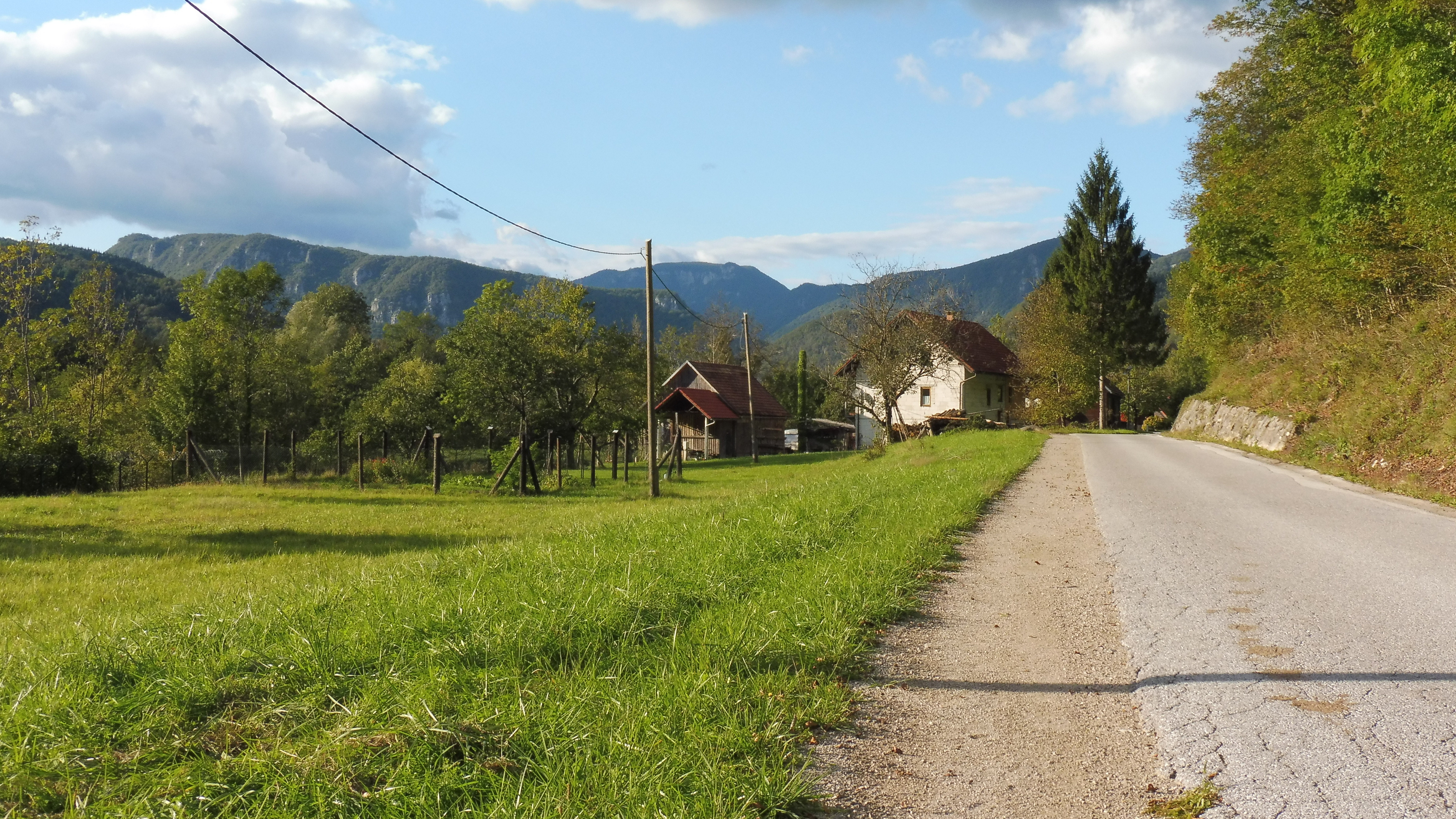
- The village of Gladloka in Kostel municipality, Slovenia

- Location in Slovenia
- Coordinates: 45°28′4.7″N 14°49′1.09″E
- Country: Slovenia
- Traditional region: Lower Carniola
- Statistical region: Southeast Slovenia
- Municipality: Kostel

Area
  - Total: 0.77 km^{2} (0.30 sq mi)
- Elevation: 272 m (892 ft)

Population (2002)
  - Total: 0
- Postal code: 1336

Gladloka (pronounced [ˈɡlaːdlɔka]) is a small settlement on the left bank of the Kolpa River in the Municipality of Kostel in southern Slovenia. The area is part of the traditional region of Lower Carniola and is now included in the Southeast Slovenia Statistical Region.
