= Krkovo nad Faro =

Krkovo
- Location in Slovenia
- Coordinates: 45°29′7.9″N 14°53′52.87″E
- Country: Slovenia
- Traditional region: Lower Carniola
- Statistical region: Southeast Slovenia
- Municipality: Kostel

Area
  - Total: 0.49 km^{2} (0.19 sq mi)
- Elevation: 383.6 m (1,259 ft)

Population (2002)
  - Total: 21
- Postal code: 1336

Krkovo nad Faro (pronounced [ˈkəɾkɔʋɔ nat ˈfaːɾɔ]) is a small village northeast of Fara in the Municipality of Kostel in southern Slovenia. The area is part of the traditional region of Lower Carniola and is now included in the Southeast Slovenia Statistical Region.

== Name ==
The name of the settlement was changed from Krkovo to Krkovo nad Faro in 1953.

== Church ==
There is a small church in the settlement, dedicated to Saint Leonard and belonging to the Parish of Fara. It was built in the 18th century.
