= Poden =

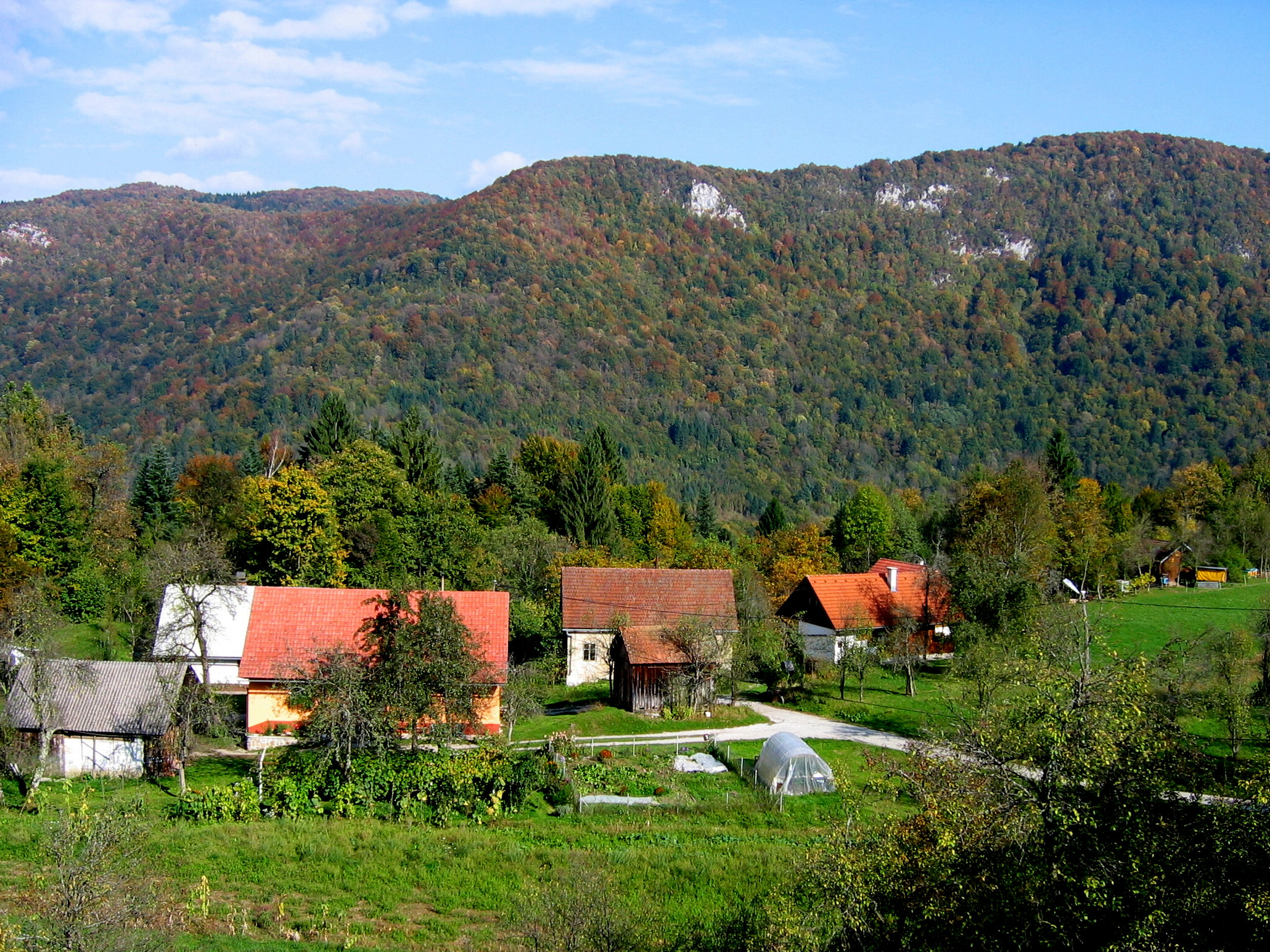

- Location in Slovenia
- Coordinates: 45°29′42.26″N 14°54′20.45″E
- Country: Slovenia
- Traditional region: Lower Carniola
- Statistical region: Southeast Slovenia
- Municipality: Kostel

Area
  - Total: 0.58 km^{2} (0.22 sq mi)
- Elevation: 334.1 m (1,096 ft)

Population (2002)
  - Total: 6
- Postal code: 1336

Poden (pronounced [ˈpoːdən]) is a small dispersed settlement in the hills above the left bank of the Kolpa River in the Municipality of Kostel in southern Slovenia. The area is part of the traditional region of Lower Carniola and is now included in the Southeast Slovenia Statistical Region.
