= Podstene pri Kostelu =

Podstene pri Kostelu Podstene (until 1955)
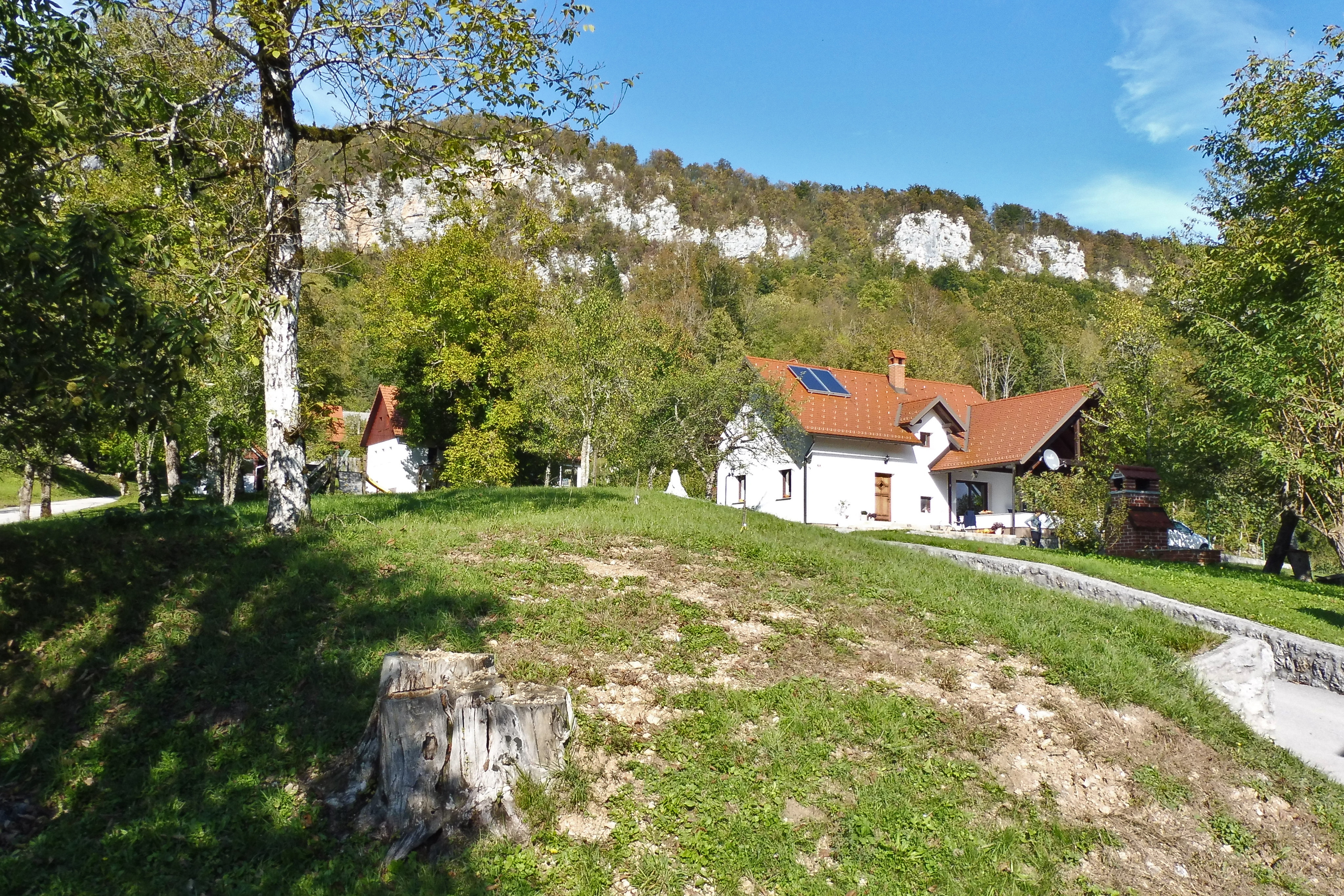
- Podstene pri Kostelu, Municipality of Kostel, Slovenia

- Location in Slovenia
- Coordinates: 45°31′25.22″N 14°53′12.99″E
- Country: Slovenia
- Traditional region: Lower Carniola
- Statistical region: Southeast Slovenia
- Municipality: Kostel

Area
  - Total: 0.64 km^{2} (0.25 sq mi)
- Elevation: 356.9 m (1,171 ft)

Population (2002)
  - Total: 4
- Postal code: 1336

Podstene pri Kostelu (pronounced [pɔdˈsteːnɛ pɾi kɔˈsteːlu]) is a small village in the Municipality of Kostel in southern Slovenia. The area is part of the traditional region of Lower Carniola and is now included in the Southeast Slovenia Statistical Region.

== Name ==
The name of the settlement was changed from Podstene to Podstene pri Kostelu in 1955.

== Church ==
The local church is dedicated to the Holy Spirit and belongs to the Parish of Banja Loka. It dates to the late 16th or early 17th century with some 19th-century additions.
