= Mavrc =

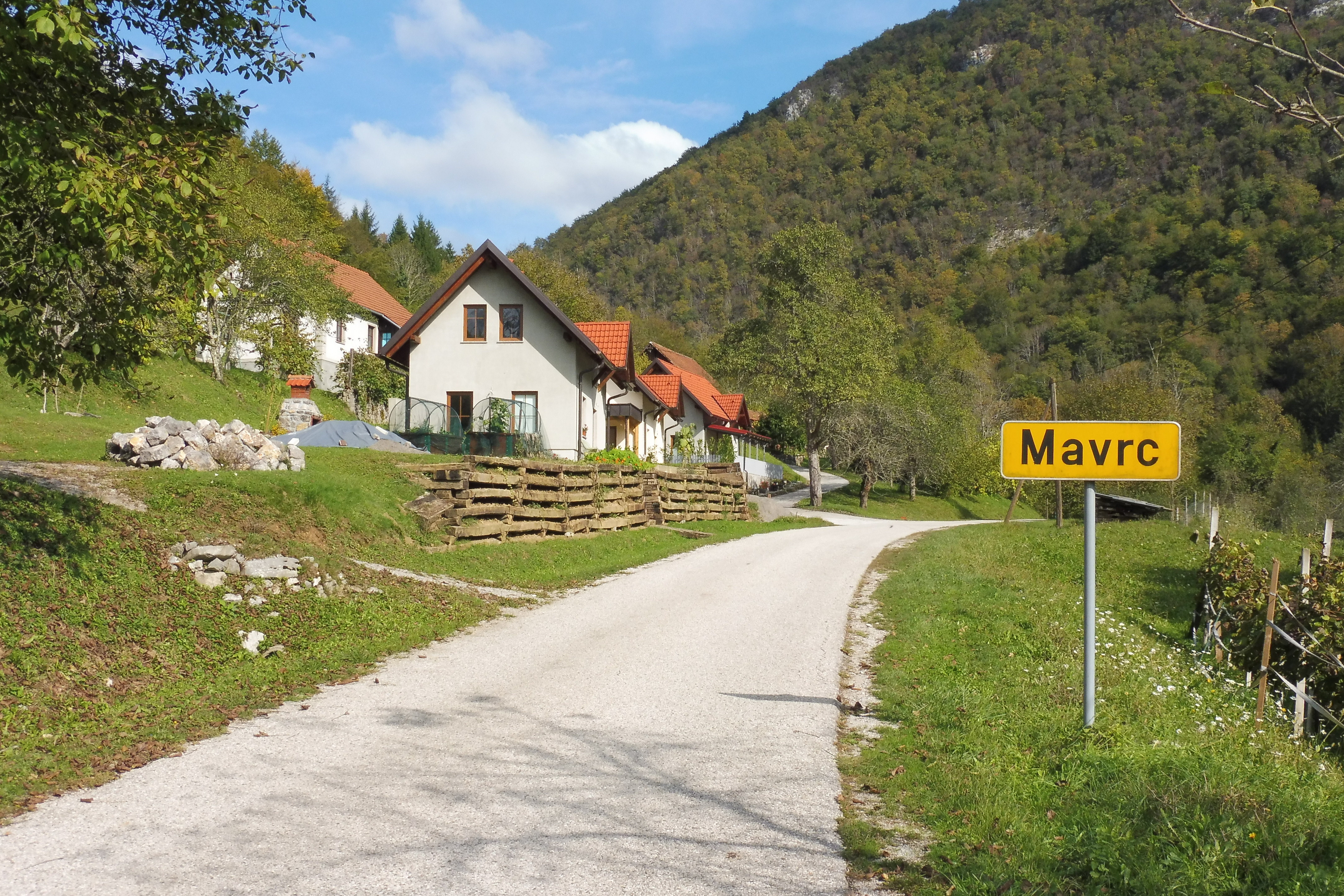

- Location in Slovenia
- Coordinates: 45°30′16.62″N 14°54′48.95″E
- Country: Slovenia
- Traditional region: Lower Carniola
- Statistical region: Southeast Slovenia
- Municipality: Kostel

Area
  - Total: 0.28 km^{2} (0.11 sq mi)
- Elevation: 249.9 m (820 ft)

Population (2002)
  - Total: 0
- Postal code: 1336

Mavrc (pronounced [ˈmaːʋəɾts]) is a small settlement on the left bank of the Kolpa River in the Municipality of Kostel in southern Slovenia. Kostel Castle dominates the cliff to the north above the settlement. The area is part of the traditional region of Lower Carniola and is now included in the Southeast Slovenia Statistical Region.
