= Jakšiči =

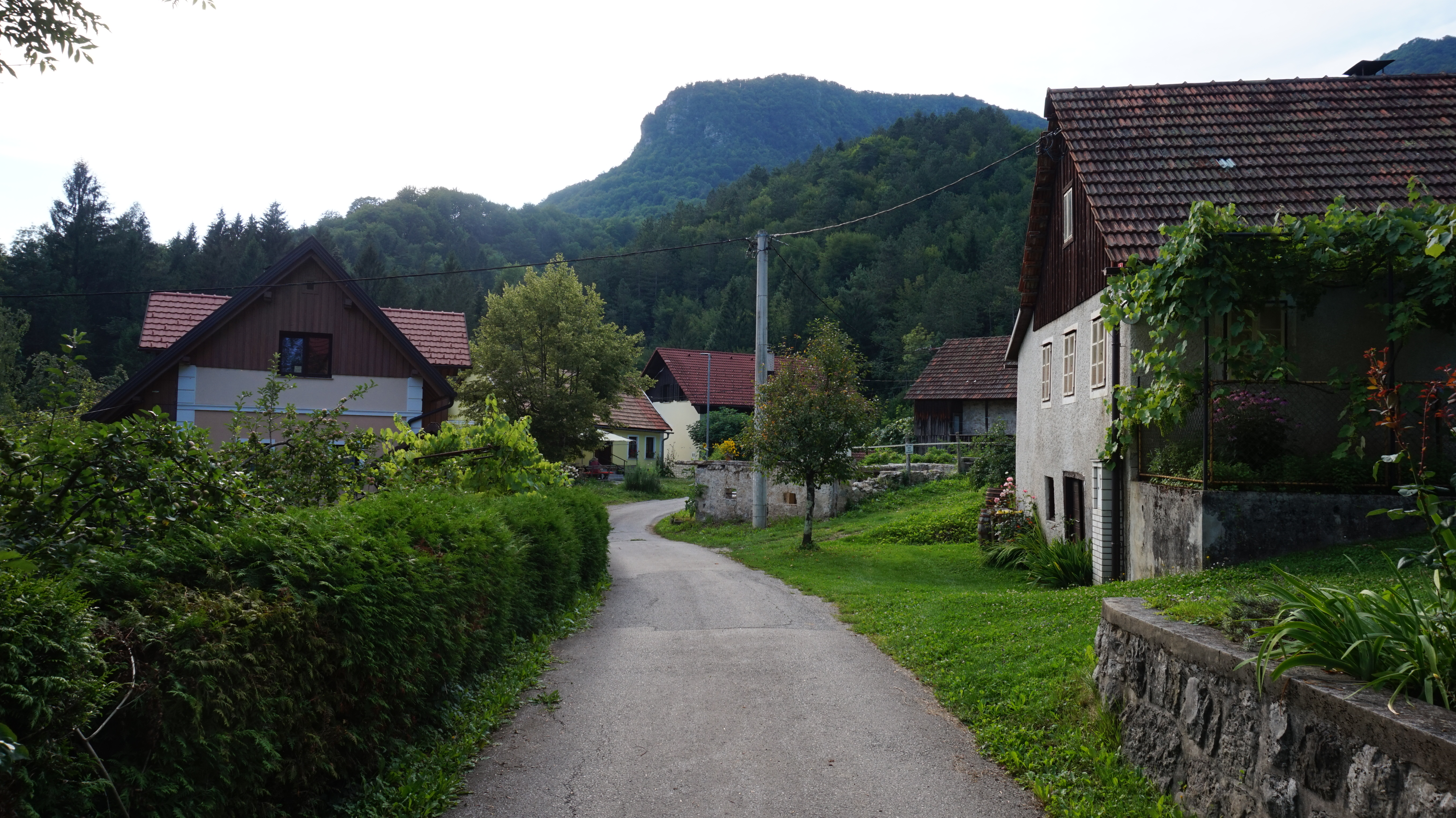

- Location in Slovenia
- Coordinates: 45°28′51.61″N 14°52′17.57″E
- Country: Slovenia
- Traditional region: Lower Carniola
- Statistical region: Southeast Slovenia
- Municipality: Kostel

Area
  - Total: 0.87 km^{2} (0.34 sq mi)
- Elevation: 280.6 m (921 ft)

Population (2002)
  - Total: 17
- Postal code: 1336

Jakšiči (pronounced [ˈjaːkʃitʃi]; in older sources also Jakšič, German: Jakschitz) is a small settlement to the west of Fara in the Municipality of Kostel in southern Slovenia. The area is part of the traditional region of Lower Carniola and is now included in the Southeast Slovenia Statistical Region.
