= Gorenji Potok =

- Location in Slovenia
- Coordinates: 45°31′30.34″N 14°52′16.3″E
- Country: Slovenia
- Traditional region: Lower Carniola
- Statistical region: Southeast Slovenia
- Municipality: Kostel

Area
  - Total: 0.24 km^{2} (0.093 sq mi)
- Elevation: 371.4 m (1,219 ft)

Population (2014)
  - Total: 1
  - Density: 4/km^{2} (10/sq mi)
- Postal code: 1336

Gorenji Potok (pronounced [ɡɔˈɾeːnji ˈpɔːtɔk]) is a small settlement in the Municipality of Kostel in southern Slovenia. The area is part of the traditional region of Lower Carniola and is now included in the Southeast Slovenia Statistical Region.

A prehistoric Iron Age site has been discovered on Jastrnik Hill south of the settlement.
