= Grivac, Kostel =

Grivac
- Location in Slovenia
- Coordinates: 45°27′51.88″N 14°50′34.59″E
- Country: Slovenia
- Traditional region: Lower Carniola
- Statistical region: Southeast Slovenia
- Municipality: Kostel

Area
  - Total: 1.34 km^{2} (0.52 sq mi)
- Elevation: 237 m (778 ft)

Population (2002)
  - Total: 23
- Postal code: 1336

Grivac (pronounced [ˈɡɾiːʋats]) is a settlement on the left bank of the Kolpa River west of Petrina in the Municipality of Kostel in southern Slovenia. The area is part of the traditional region of Lower Carniola and is now included in the Southeast Slovenia Statistical Region.
