= Colnarji =

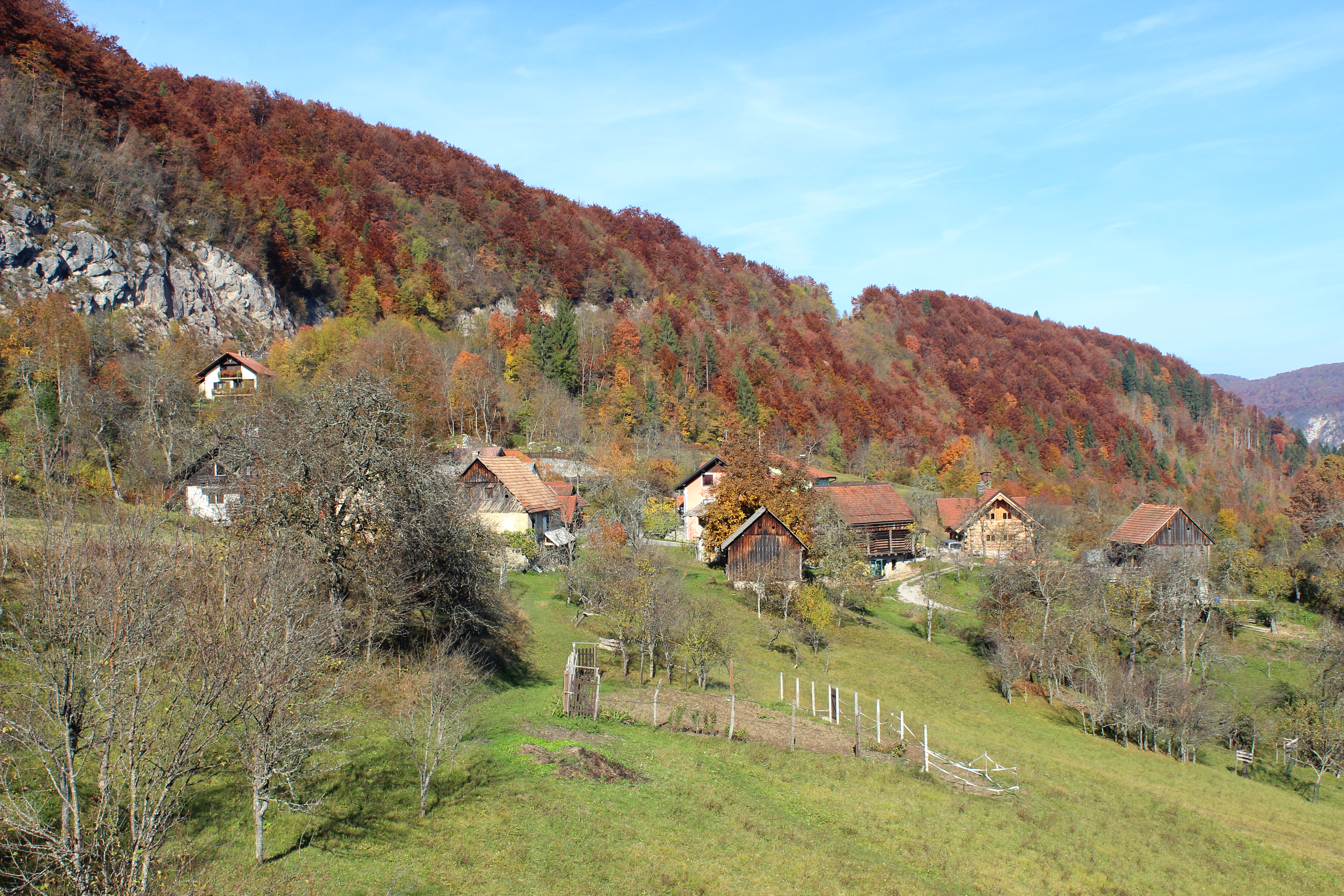

- Location in Slovenia
- Coordinates: 45°29′51.95″N 14°53′38.05″E
- Country: Slovenia
- Traditional region: Lower Carniola
- Statistical region: Southeast Slovenia
- Municipality: Kostel

Area
  - Total: 0.54 km^{2} (0.21 sq mi)
- Elevation: 462.3 m (1,517 ft)

Population (2002)
  - Total: 11
- Postal code: 1336

Colnarji (pronounced [ˈtsoːlnaɾji]; German: Zollnern) is a small settlement in the Municipality of Kostel in southern Slovenia. The area is part of the traditional region of Lower Carniola and is now included in the Southeast Slovenia Statistical Region.
