= Potok, Kostel =

Potok
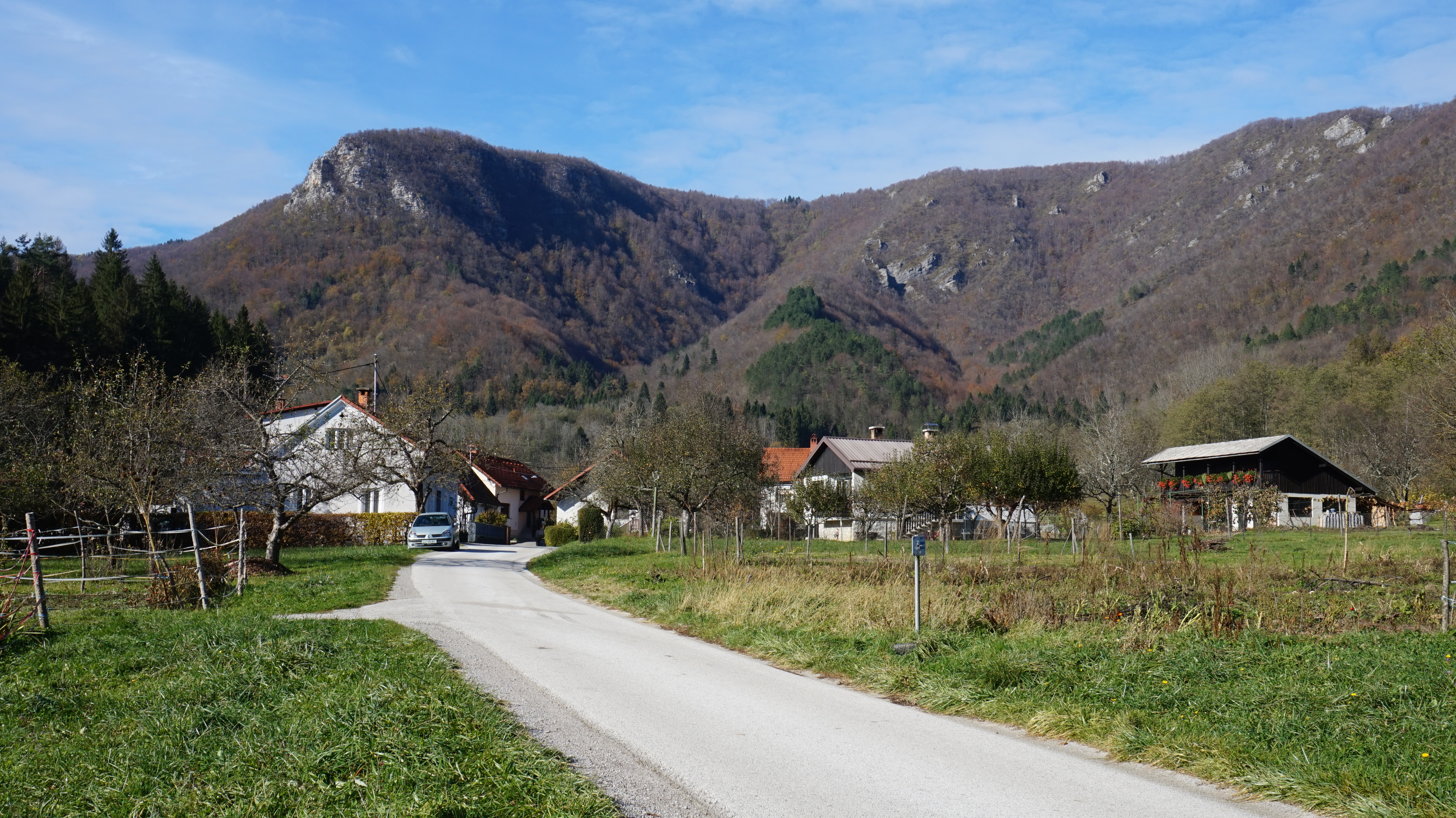

- Location in Slovenia
- Coordinates: 45°28′32.83″N 14°52′23.14″E
- Country: Slovenia
- Traditional region: Lower Carniola
- Statistical region: Southeast Slovenia
- Municipality: Kostel

Area
  - Total: 0.17 km^{2} (0.066 sq mi)
- Elevation: 230.1 m (755 ft)

Population (2002)
  - Total: 71
- Postal code: 1336

Potok (pronounced [ˈpɔːtɔk]) is a small settlement on the left bank of the Kolpa River west of Fara in the Municipality of Kostel in southern Slovenia. The area is part of the traditional region of Lower Carniola and is now included in the Southeast Slovenia Statistical Region.

== Name ==
The name of the settlement literally means 'creek, stream'. Warm Creek (Slovene: Topli potok), a tributary of the Kolpa River, flows through the village.
