= Pirče, Kostel =

Pirče
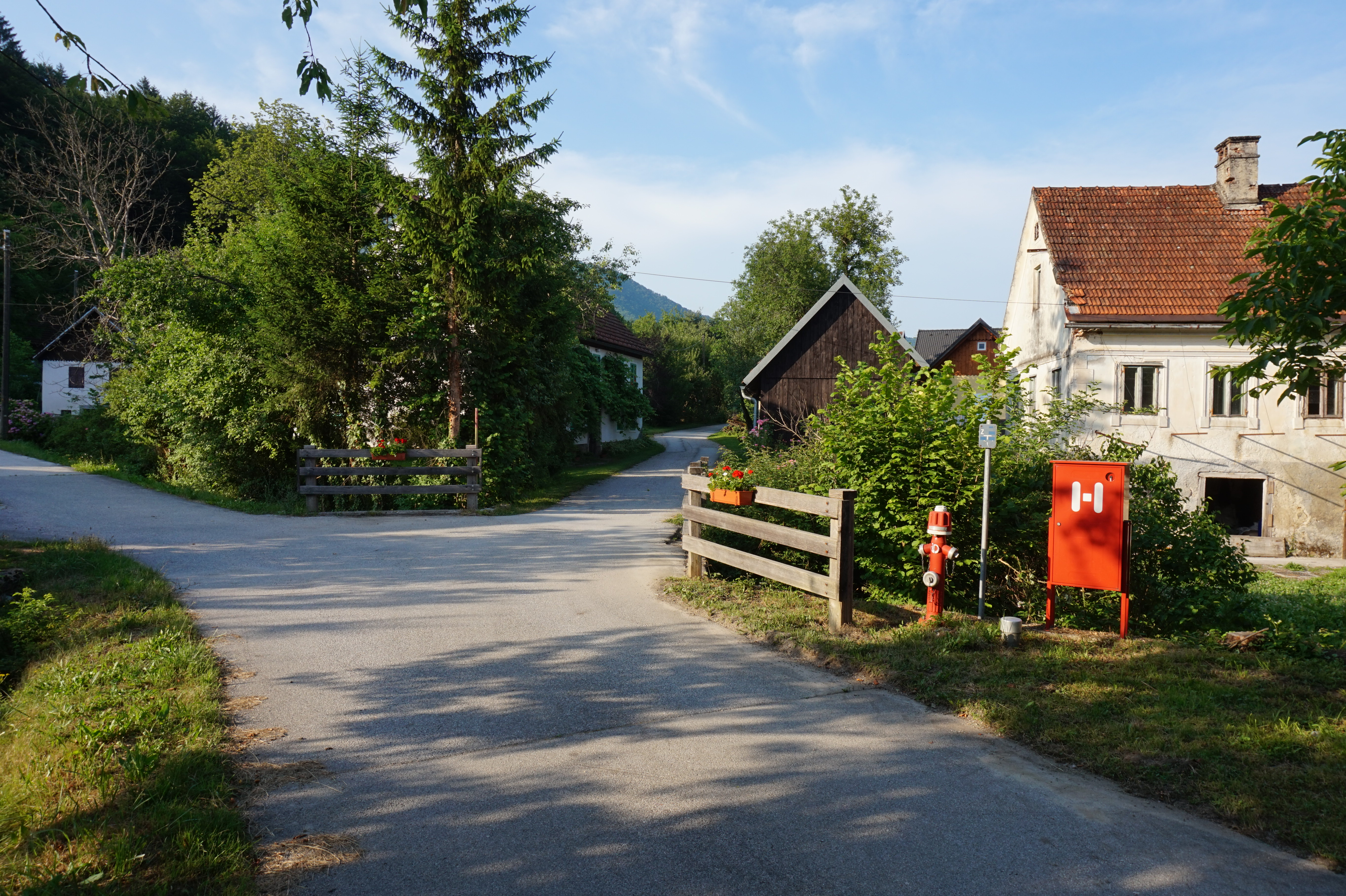

- Location in Slovenia
- Coordinates: 45°28′4.58″N 14°51′28.42″E
- Country: Slovenia
- Traditional region: Lower Carniola
- Statistical region: Southeast Slovenia
- Municipality: Kostel

Area
  - Total: 0.64 km^{2} (0.25 sq mi)
- Elevation: 227.8 m (747 ft)

Population (2002)
  - Total: 22
- Postal code: 1336

Pirče (pronounced [ˈpiːɾtʃɛ]; German: Pirtsche) is a settlement on the left bank of the Kolpa River in the Municipality of Kostel in southern Slovenia. The area is part of the traditional region of Lower Carniola and is now included in the Southeast Slovenia Statistical Region.

There is a small chapel in the settlement dedicated to the Virgin Mary. It dates to the late 19th century.
