= Padovo pri Fari =

- Location in Slovenia
- Coordinates: 45°28′59.82″N 14°54′13.61″E
- Country: Slovenia
- Traditional region: Lower Carniola
- Statistical region: Southeast Slovenia
- Municipality: Kostel

Area
  - Total: 0.32 km^{2} (0.12 sq mi)
- Elevation: 315.8 m (1,036 ft)

Population (2002)
  - Total: 0
- Postal code: 1336

Padovo pri Fari (pronounced [ˈpaːdɔʋɔ pɾi ˈfaːɾi]; in older sources also Padova, German: Padua) is a small settlement in the hills above the left bank of the Kolpa River in the Municipality of Kostel in southern Slovenia. The area is part of the traditional region of Lower Carniola and is now included in the Southeast Slovenia Statistical Region.

== Name ==
The name of the settlement was changed from Padovo to Padovo pri Fari in 1953. In the past the German name was Padua.
