= Gornji Turni =

- Village
- Interactive map of Gornji Turni
- Coordinates: 45°25′08″N 14°49′44″E
- Country: Croatia
- County: Primorje-Gorski Kotar County
- Town: Delnice

Area
  - Total: 2.3 km^{2} (0.89 sq mi)

Population (2021)
  - Total: 5
  - Density: 2.2/km^{2} (5.6/sq mi)
- Time zone: UTC+1 (CET)
  - Summer (DST): UTC+2 (CEST)

Gornji Turni is a village in Primorje-Gorski Kotar County in Croatia, on the territory of the city of Delnice.

== Demographics ==
Village of Gornji Turni: Population trends 1857–2021
v

population	49	107	104	105	92	245	194	86	78	71	71	59	31	22	15	13	9
	1857	1869	1880	1890	1900	1910	1921	1931	1948	1953	1961	1971	1981	1991	2001	2011	2021

Note:"Turni" in 1910. Includes Marija Trošt in 1910 and 1921. Sources: Croatian Bureau of Statistics publications

== Notable people ==
Notable people who were born or lived in Gornji Turni include:

- Josip Lisac (b. 23 November 1950), linguist
