= Grgelj =

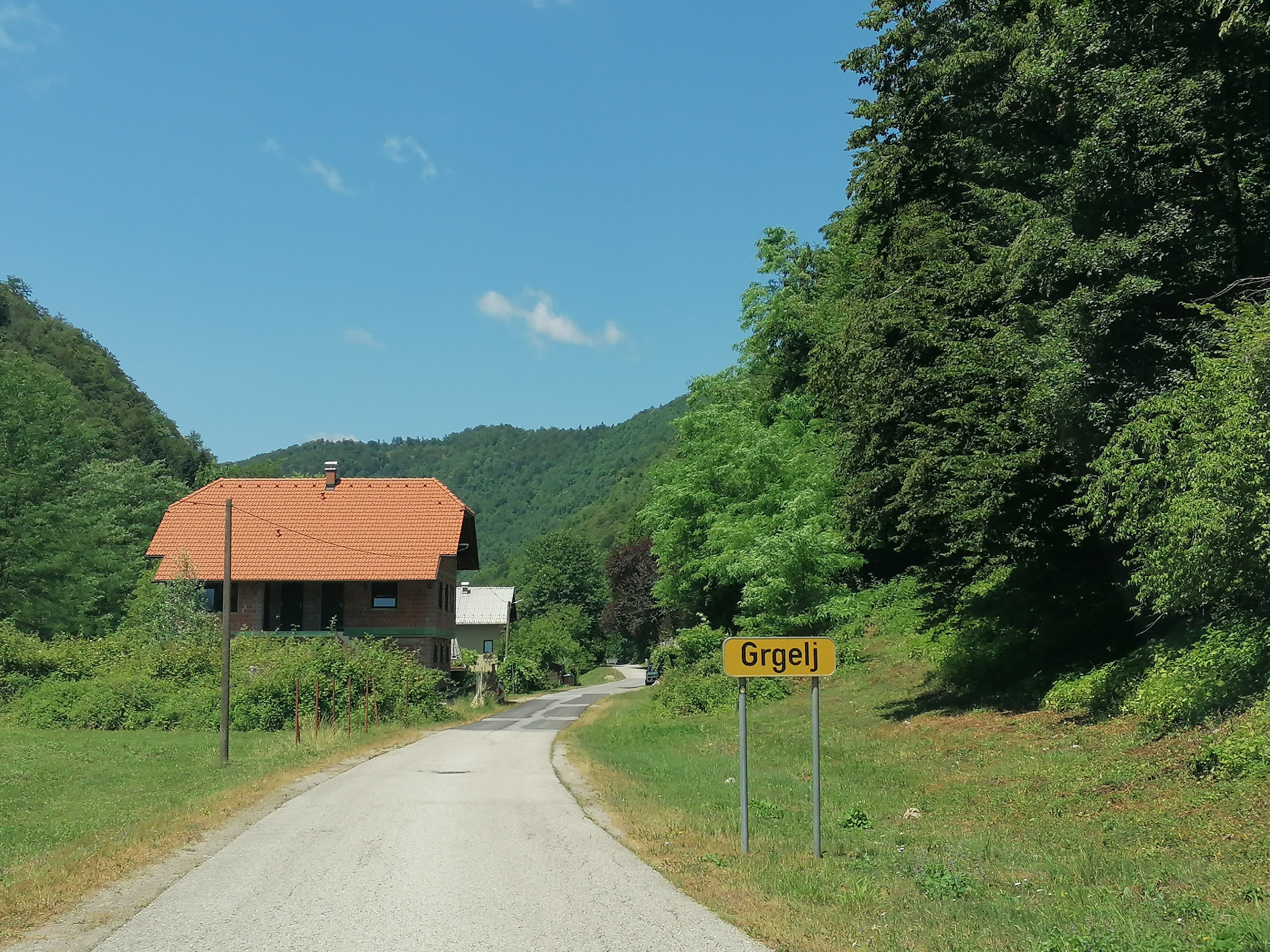

- Location in Slovenia
- Coordinates: 45°31′16.95″N 14°56′56.05″E
- Country: Slovenia
- Traditional region: Lower Carniola
- Statistical region: Southeast Slovenia
- Municipality: Kostel

Area
  - Total: 2.06 km^{2} (0.80 sq mi)
- Elevation: 243.3 m (798 ft)

Population (2014)
  - Total: 1
  - Density: 1/km^{2} (2.6/sq mi)
- Postal code: 1336

Grgelj (pronounced [ˈɡəɾɡəl]; German: Beim Gergel, Beim Görgel) is a dispersed settlement that stretches along the left bank of the Kolpa River in the Municipality of Kostel in southern Slovenia. The area is part of the traditional region of Lower Carniola and is now included in the Southeast Slovenia Statistical Region.
