= Srobotnik pri Velikih Laščah =

- Location in Slovenia
- Coordinates: 45°49′32.87″N 14°38′48.1″E
- Country: Slovenia
- Traditional region: Lower Carniola
- Statistical region: Central Slovenia
- Municipality: Velike Lašče

Area
  - Total: 0.4 km^{2} (0.15 sq mi)
- Elevation: 569.1 m (1,867 ft)

Population (2002)
  - Total: 49
- Postal code: 1315

Srobotnik pri Velikih Laščah (pronounced [sɾɔbɔˈtniːk pɾi ˈʋeːlikix ˈlaːʃtʃax]) is a small village southeast of Velike Lašče in central Slovenia. The entire Municipality of Velike Lašče is part of the traditional region of Lower Carniola and is now included in the Central Slovenia Statistical Region.

== Name ==
The name of the settlement was changed from Srobotnik to Srobotnik pri Velikih Laščah in 1953.

== Church ==
The local church, built on a small hill northwest of the main settlement, is dedicated to Saint Roch and belongs to the Parish of Velike Lašče. It was commissioned in 1624 by the owner of Ortnek Castle Krištof Moškon (Count Mosconi). It was rebuilt in 1731 and again in 1875. During the Second World War, it was targeted by Partisan mortars on 28 February 1944. During the attack, the main altar was burned, together with a painting by Anton Postl from 1770. The church was restored in the 1970s.
