= Srobotnik ob Kolpi =

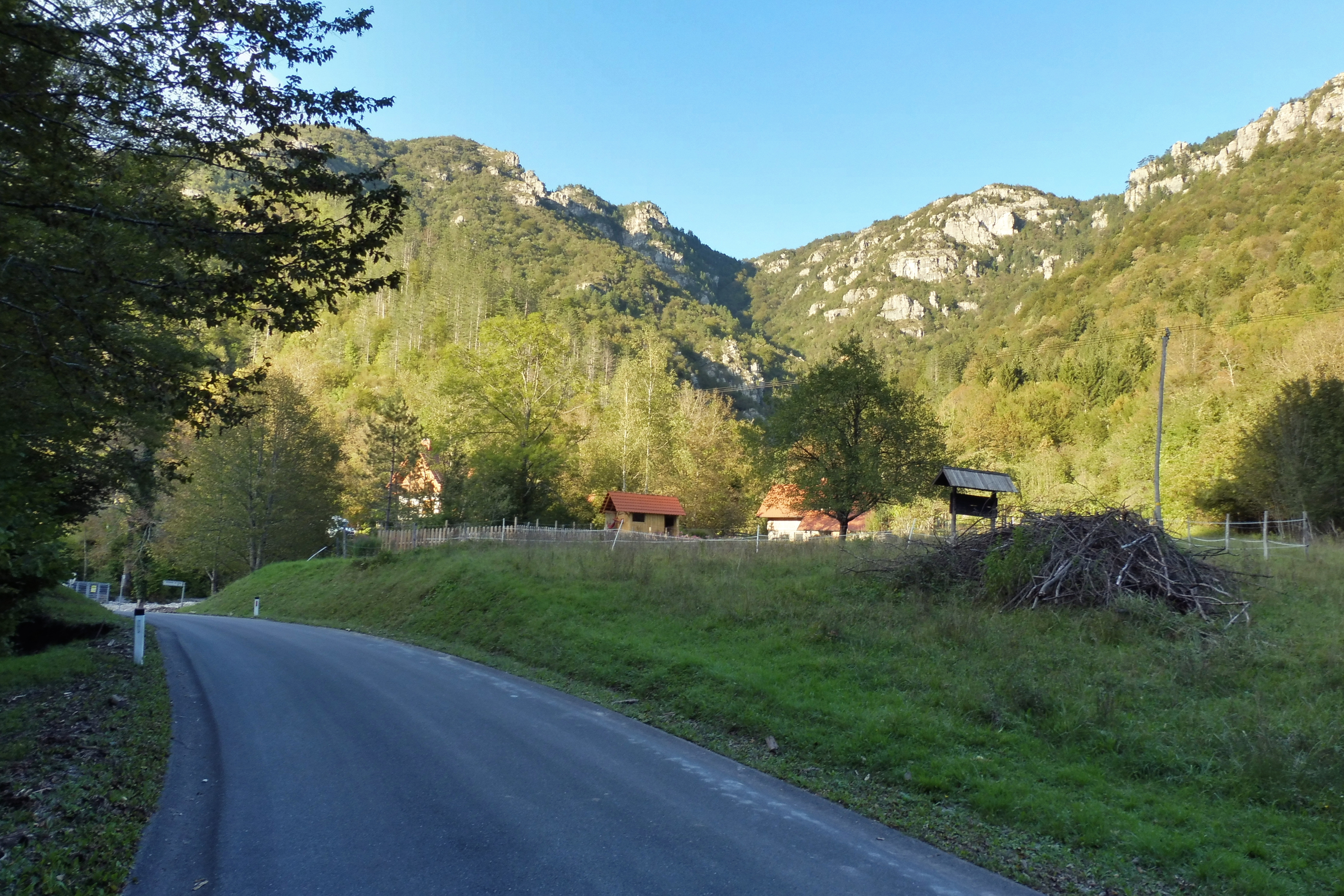

- Location in Slovenia
- Coordinates: 45°30′10.93″N 14°47′55.73″E
- Country: Slovenia
- Traditional region: Lower Carniola
- Statistical region: Southeast Slovenia
- Municipality: Kostel

Area
  - Total: 2.77 km^{2} (1.07 sq mi)
- Elevation: 267.3 m (877 ft)

Population (2002)
  - Total: 0
- Postal code: 1336

Srobotnik ob Kolpi (pronounced [sɾɔbɔˈtniːk ɔp ˈkoːlpi]) is a small settlement on the left bank of the Kolpa River in the Kostel in southern Slovenia. The area is part of the traditional region of Lower Carniola and is now included in the Southeast Slovenia Statistical Region.

== Name ==
The name of the settlement was changed from Srobotnik to Srobotnik ob Kolpi in 1953.

== Church ==
The local church, built on a small promontory above the Kolpa River west of the settlement, is dedicated to Saint Anne. It dates to the 19th century.

== Nature ==
Local Lepidoptera include Zygaena filipendulae and Z. purpuralis.
