= Petrina, Kostel =

Petrina
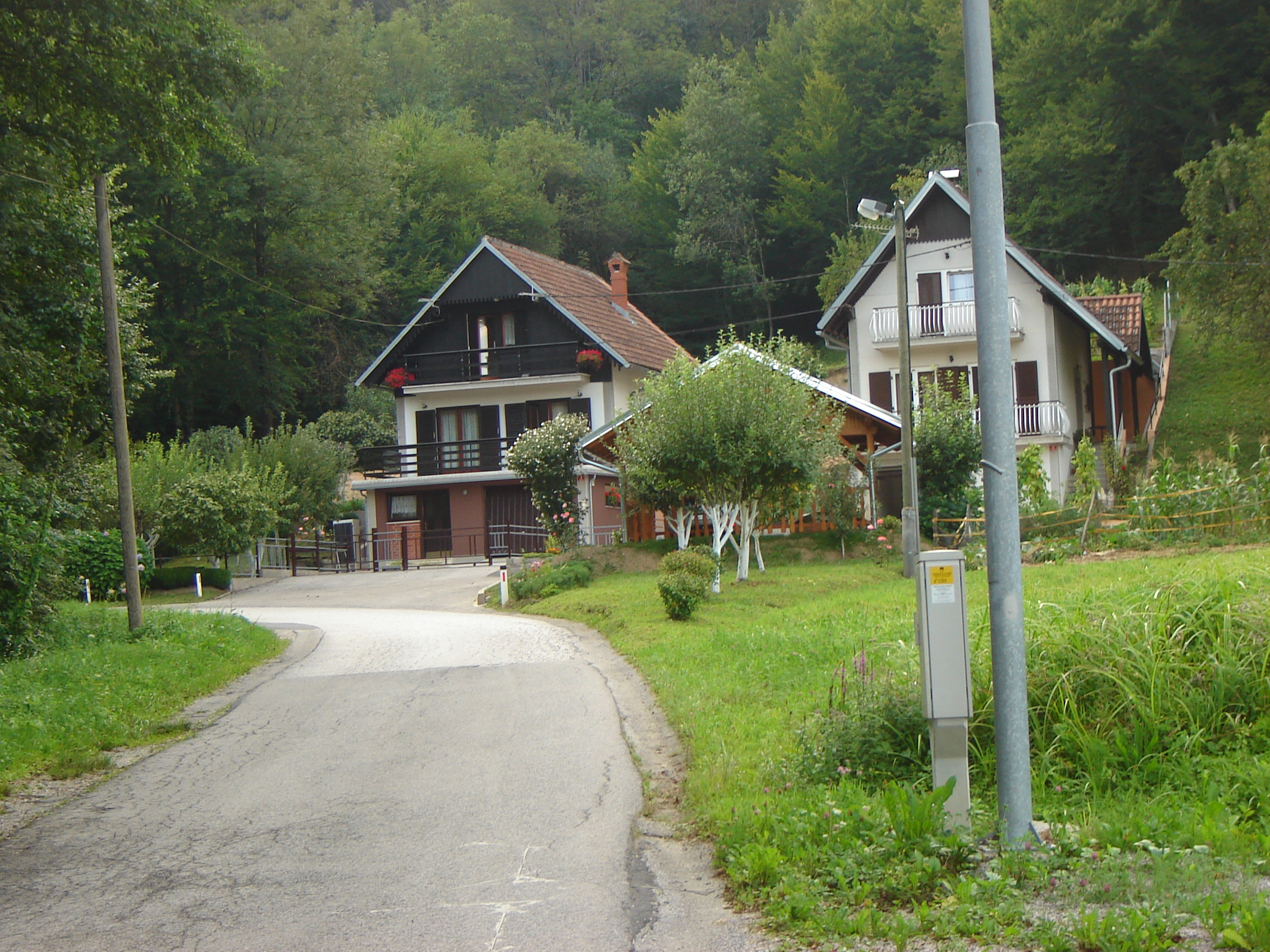
- Petrina

- Location in Slovenia
- Coordinates: 45°27′53.87″N 14°51′10.49″E
- Country: Slovenia
- Traditional region: Lower Carniola
- Statistical region: Southeast Slovenia
- Municipality: Kostel

Area
  - Total: 0.32 km^{2} (0.12 sq mi)
- Elevation: 228.4 m (749 ft)

Population (2002)
  - Total: 9
- Postal code: 1336

Petrina (pronounced [pɛˈtɾiːna]) is a small settlement on the left bank of the Kolpa River in the Municipality of Kostel in southern Slovenia. A bridge over the river connects it to Brod na Kupi on the Croatian side of the border. The area is part of the traditional region of Lower Carniola and is now included in the Southeast Slovenia Statistical Region.
