= Vas, Kostel =

Vas
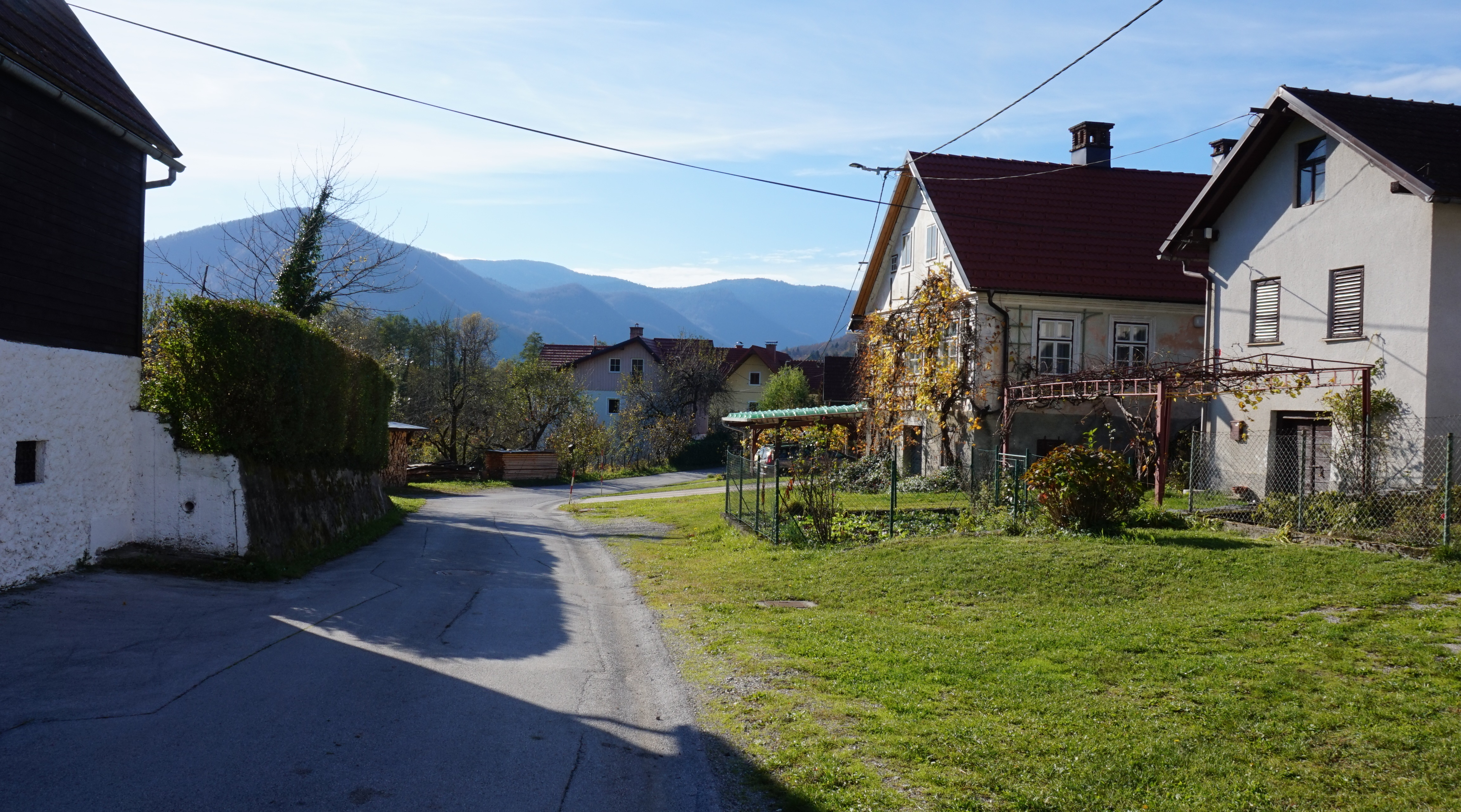

- Location in Slovenia
- Coordinates: 45°28′20.84″N 14°52′21.79″E
- Country: Slovenia
- Traditional region: Lower Carniola
- Statistical region: Southeast Slovenia
- Municipality: Kostel

Area
  - Total: 0.82 km^{2} (0.32 sq mi)
- Elevation: 222.8 m (731 ft)

Population (2002)
  - Total: 67
- Postal code: 1336

Vas (pronounced [ˈʋaːs]) is a small village on the left bank of the Kolpa River southwest of Fara in the Municipality of Kostel in southern Slovenia. The area is part of the traditional region of Lower Carniola and is now included in the Southeast Slovenia Statistical Region.

== History ==
The Vas–Fara volunteer fire department became a founding unit of the Kočevje municipal fire department on 28 August 1955.

== Cultural heritage ==
There is a small chapel-shrine in the settlement dedicated to the Virgin Mary. It dates to the early 20th century.
