= Kuželj, Kostel =

Kuželj
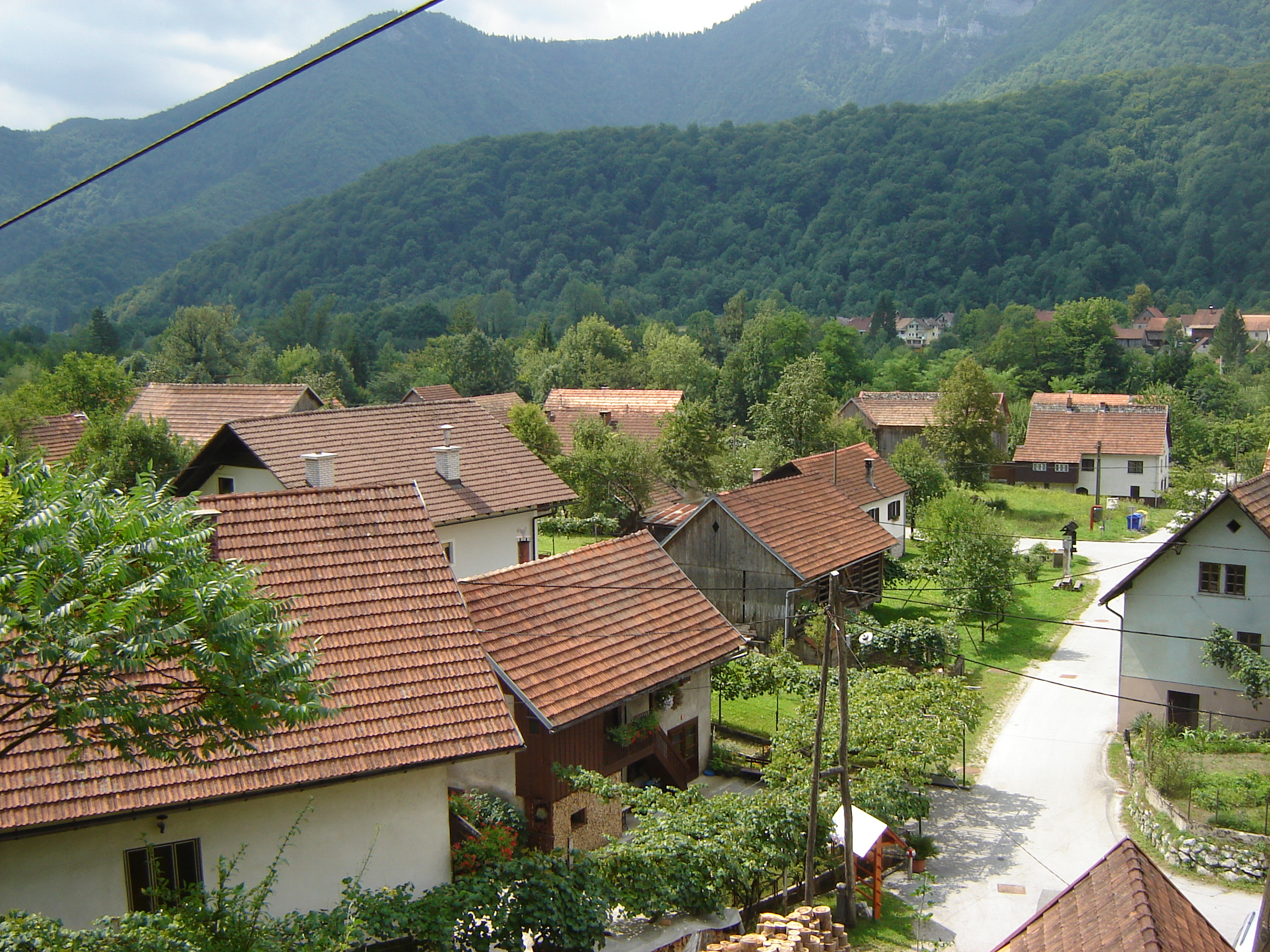
- Kuželj

- Location in Slovenia
- Coordinates: 45°28′39.32″N 14°48′36.58″E
- Country: Slovenia
- Traditional region: Lower Carniola
- Statistical region: Southeast Slovenia
- Municipality: Kostel

Area
  - Total: 2.99 km^{2} (1.15 sq mi)
- Elevation: 242.8 m (797 ft)

Population (2002)
  - Total: 54
- Postal code: 1336

Kuželj (pronounced [ˈkuːʒɛl]; German: Kuschel) is a small village on the left bank of the Kolpa River in the Municipality of Kostel in southern Slovenia. The area is part of the traditional region of Lower Carniola and is now included in the Southeast Slovenia Statistical Region.

== History ==
In 2021, a flood wall was built on the Slovene side of the Kolpa River to prevent flooding. The project cost €3,339,873, of which 85% was financed by the European Fund for Regional Development.
