= Kostel, Kostel =

Kostel
- Settlement
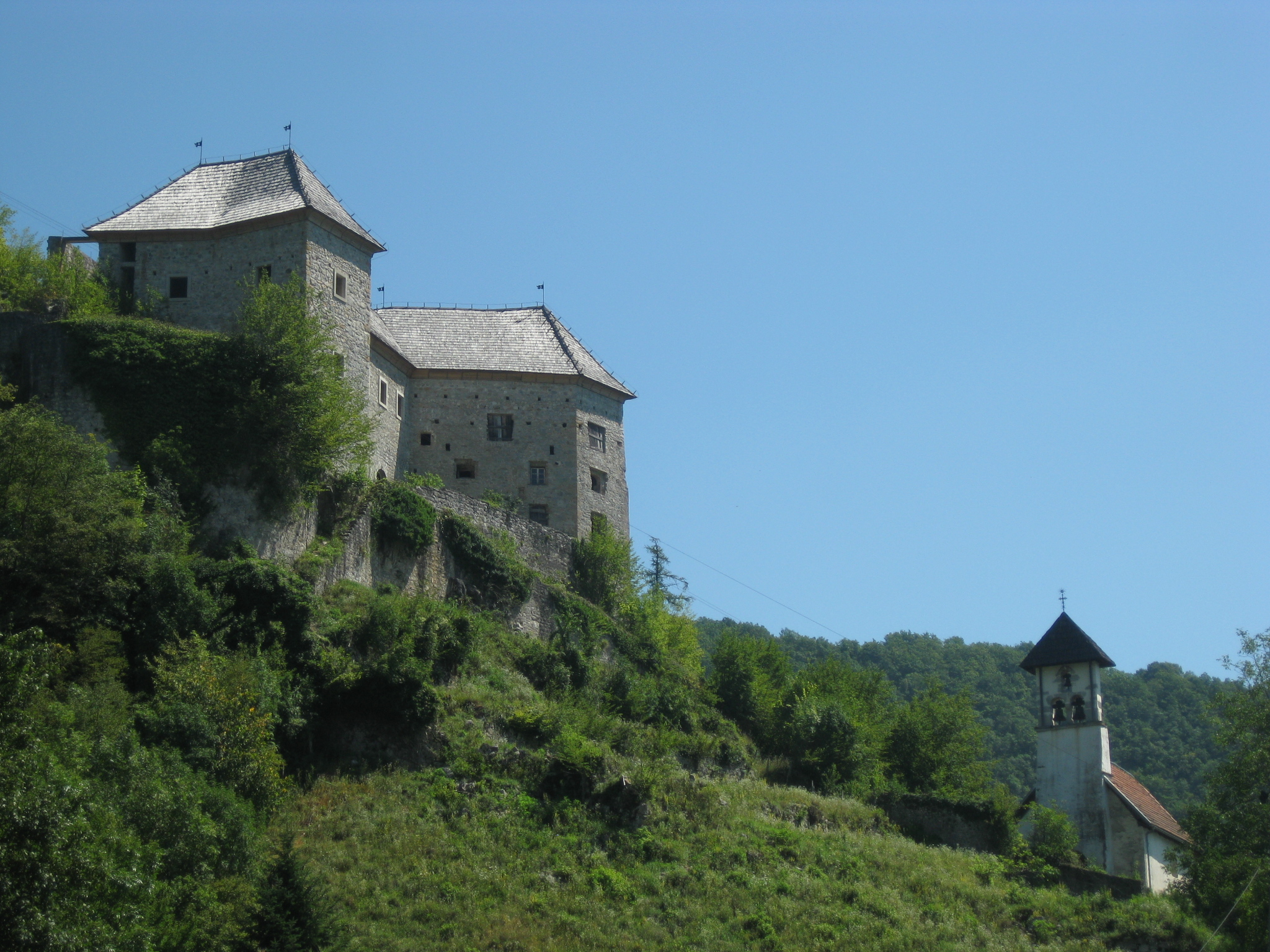
- Kostel Castle

- Location of Kostel in Slovenia
- Coordinates: 45°30′31.84″N 14°54′36.03″E
- Country: Slovenia
- Municipality: Kostel

Area
  - Total: 0.6 km^{2} (0.23 sq mi)
- Elevation: 385.3 m (1,264 ft)

Population (2012)
  - Total: 10
  - Density: 18/km^{2} (47/sq mi)

Kostel (pronounced [ˈkɔːstɛu̯]) is a settlement in the Municipality of Kostel in southern Slovenia. It is located on the left bank of the Kolpa River next to the border with Croatia. It is part of the traditional region of Lower Carniola and is now included in the Southeast Slovenia Statistical Region.

== Landmarks ==
=== Kostel Castle ===
Its main landmark from which the settlement and the municipality are named is Kostel Castle, built on a cliff above the Kolpa Valley. The castle is surrounded by a small market settlement. It dates to the 13th century with various additions over the centuries and was an important defense fortification against Ottoman raids.

=== Holy Magi Church ===
The local church is dedicated to the Magi and belongs to the parish of Fara pri Kočevju. It is a single-nave Late Gothic building that was refurbished in the Baroque style in the 18th century.
