= Fara, Kostel =

Fara
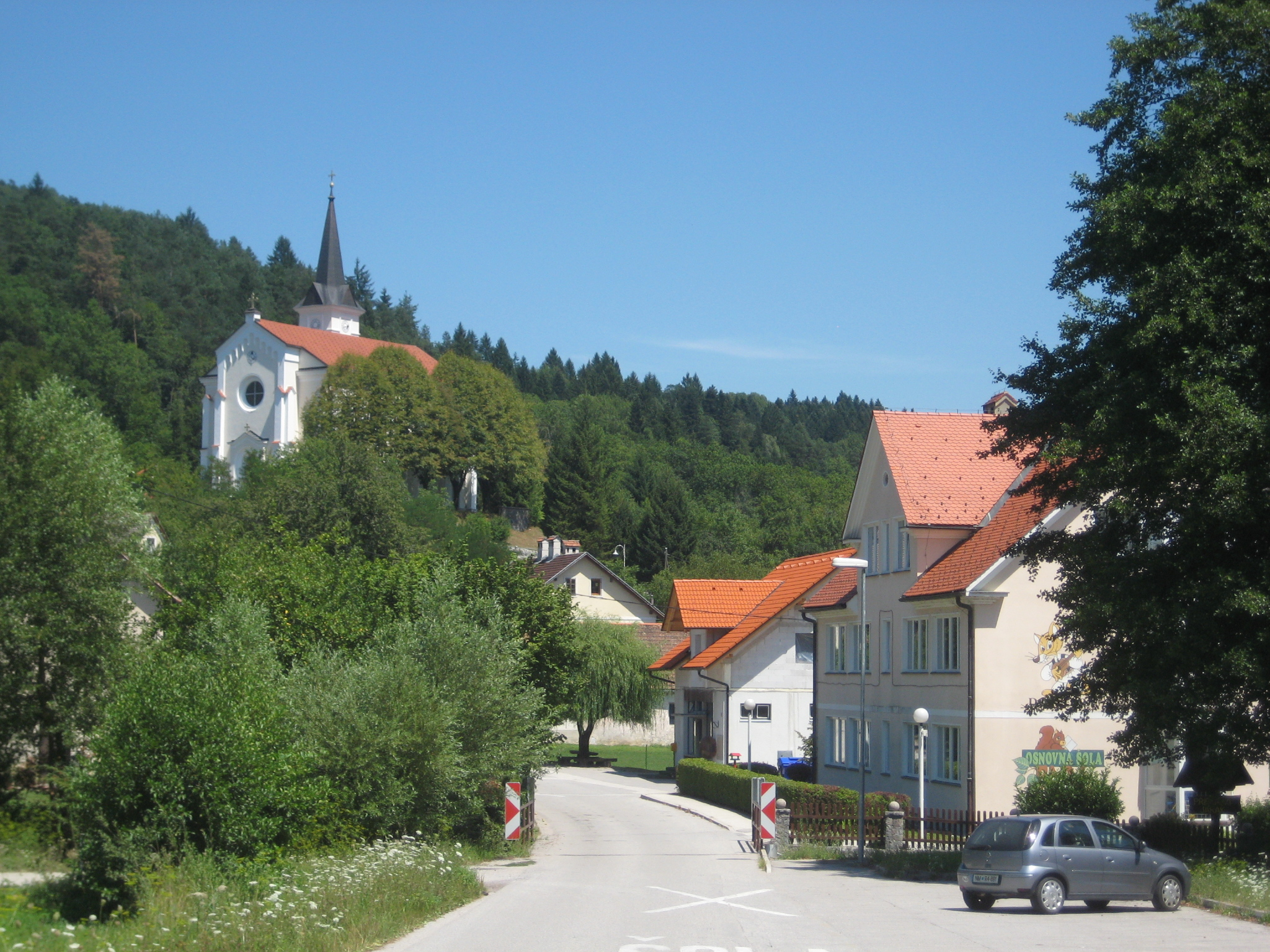

- Location in Slovenia
- Coordinates: 45°28′37.4″N 14°52′56.75″E
- Country: Slovenia
- Traditional region: Lower Carniola
- Statistical region: Southeast Slovenia
- Municipality: Kostel

Area
  - Total: 1.37 km^{2} (0.53 sq mi)
- Elevation: 227.9 m (748 ft)

Population (2002)
  - Total: 29
- Postal code: 1326

Fara (pronounced [ˈfaːɾa]) is a settlement on the left bank of the Kolpa River in the Municipality of Kostel in southern Slovenia. The municipal administration is based in the settlement. The area is part of the traditional region of Lower Carniola and is now included in the Southeast Slovenia Statistical Region.

The local parish church is dedicated to the Assumption of Mary and belongs to the Roman Catholic Diocese of Novo Mesto. It is a large building with a triple nave that was built between 1858 and 1864 in the Neo-Romanesque style on the site of an earlier church. A second church in the village is dedicated to Saint Stephen and is a late 16th- or early 17th-century building that was refurbished in the 18th and 19th centuries.
