= Banja Loka =

Banja Loka Banjaloka (until 2000)
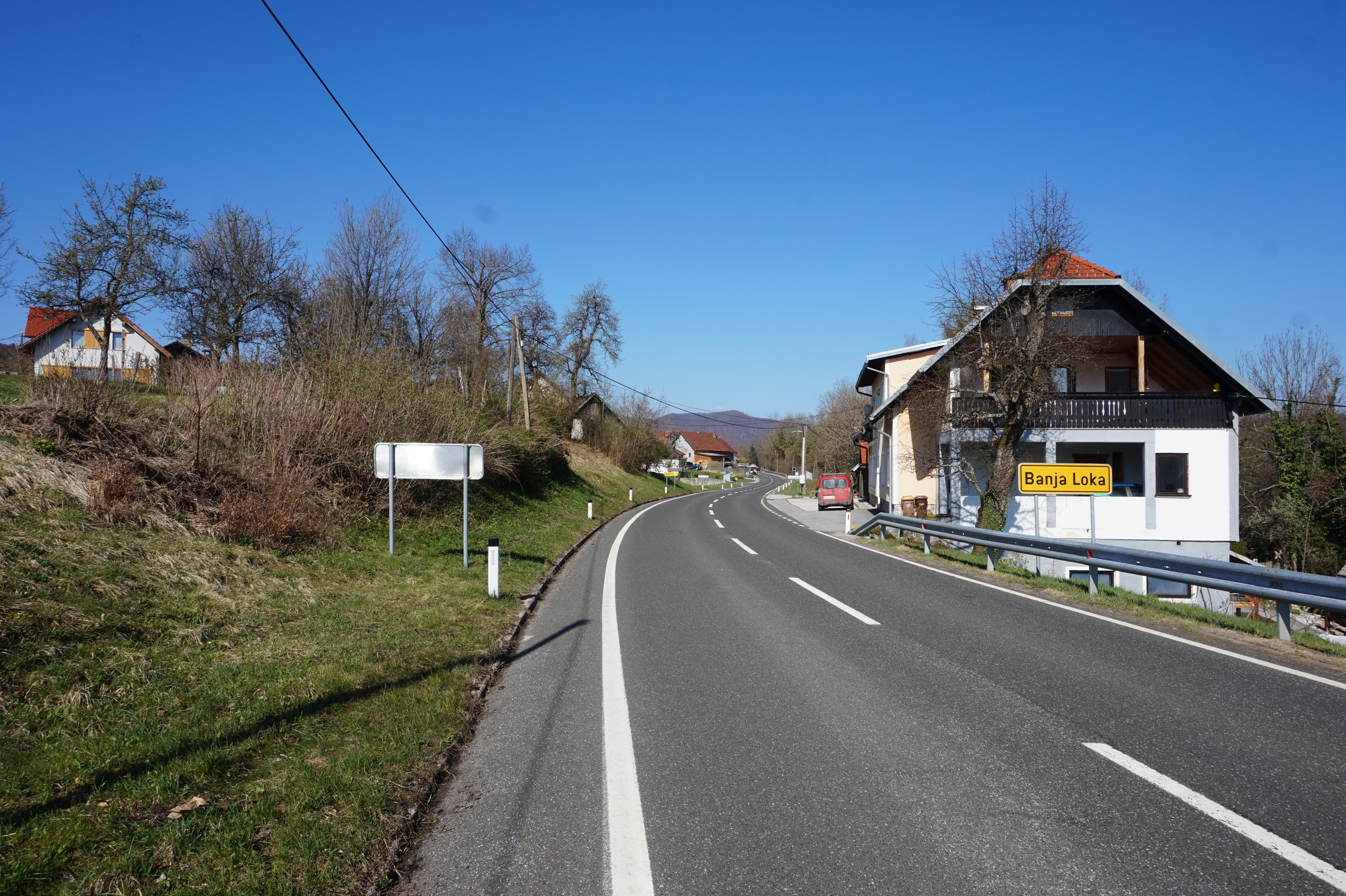
- Village of Banja Loka

- Location in Slovenia
- Coordinates: 45°30′44.03″N 14°52′26.08″E
- Country: Slovenia
- Traditional region: Lower Carniola
- Statistical region: Southeast Slovenia
- Municipality: Kostel

Area
  - Total: 3.71 km^{2} (1.43 sq mi)
- Elevation: 552.7 m (1,813 ft)

Population (2002)
  - Total: 35
- Postal code: 1336

Banja Loka (pronounced [ˈbaːnja ˈloːka]; formerly also Banjaloka) is a small village in the Municipality of Kostel in southern Slovenia. The area is part of the traditional region of Lower Carniola and is now included in the Southeast Slovenia statistical region.

== Name ==
Banja Loka was attested in historical sources as Lakch in 1470 and Ywagnalocka in 1494, and in 1763–87 as Bainloka. The first part of the name may be derived from the personal name Ban or from the obsolete common noun ban 'royal representative', and loka refers to a low-lying meadow. The name therefore means either 'Ban's meadow' or 'royal representative's meadow'. Locally, the settlement is known as Banoka, Banloka, or Banjloka. The name of the village was officially changed from Banjaloka to Banja Loka in 2000.

== Church ==
The local parish church, built to the east of the settlement next to the cemetery, is dedicated to Saint James (Slovene: sveti Jakob) and belongs to the Roman Catholic Diocese of Novo Mesto. It was built in 1742 and has a cruciform floor plan with a large belfry.
