= Mixed Kočevje subdialects =

Slovene dialect spoken around Kočevje

- Native to: Slovenia
- Region: Gotenica area and Kočevski Rog
- Ethnicity: Slovenes
- Language family: Indo-European: Balto-Slavic; Slavic; South Slavic; Western South Slavic; Slovene; Lower Carniolan; Mixed Kočevje subdialects

Language codes
- ISO 639-3: –
- Mixed Kočevje subdialects

Mixed Kočevje subdialects (Slovene: mešani kočevski govori) is a catch-all category for the Slovene dialects of heterogeneous origin now spoken in the Kočevje region, between Goteniška Gora in the west and the Kočevje Rog Plateau in the east, and spanning as far south as the border with Croatia border. The microdialects are very poorly studied, but they are very close to standard Slovene. The subdialects border the North White Carniolan dialect to the east, South White Carniolan dialect to the southwest, Kostel dialect to the south, Čabranka dialect to the west, and Lower Carniolan dialect to the north. The subdialects are derived from many different dialect bases, but they are currently listed as a special group of subdialects in the Lower Carnolan dialect group.

== Geographical distribution ==
The Mixed Kočevje subdialects are spoken where Gottschee Germans used to live; this is around Kočevje, east somewhat past the Kočevje Rog Plateau to Črmošnjice and Komarna Vas, north to Stari Log and Ložine, west to Gotenica and Goteniška Gora, and south to Briga and Grgelj. It is thought that the subdialects do not extend as far south as Logar and Rigler proposed because German was never spoken along the Kolpa River and the Kostel dialect is actually spoken there; however, due to a lack of research, this cannot be determined. The area where the Gottschee Germans used to live is larger than area where the Mixed Kočevje subdialects are currently spoken. Border areas were heavily influenced by the neighboring dialects, and so the original microdialects remained more or less intact and immigrants are in the process of assimilation. Notable settlements include Kočevje, Šalka Vas, Livold, Mozelj, Podlesje, Kočevska Reka, Borovec pri Kočevski Reki, Grčarice, Koblarji, Stari Log, Črmošnjice, Planina, and Koprivnik.

== History ==
The region was sparsely populated in the 13th century, and so in 1330 Gottschee Germans were settled here and lived along with the native population. Both Slovene and German populations lived in this area and still do; however, after the disintegration of Austria-Hungary and especially during the Second World War, when the Gottscheers voluntarily moved or were forcibly deported, the area became empty and later was repopulated, mostly by people from Slovenia, but also from other former Yugoslav republics. The area was therefore resettled by speakers from various areas and (mostly Slovene) dialects, creating a new mixed dialect area. The various microdialects, as well as the dialect spoken by the native Slovenes, are in the process of merging.

== Research ==
A lack of research means that very little is known about the characteristics of the Slovene spoken here, other than that the language of the area differs from the surrounding Lower Carniolan and White Carniolan area.

=== Indigenous people ===
Despite the fact that more than 1,000 Slovenes lived in this area before the immigration, no attempts to study their dialect were made. Fran Ramovš completely excluded the area despite his research after the First World War. Tine Logar and Jakob Rigler also did not show much interest in studying this area. This area is also excluded from Slovenski lingvistični atlas.

=== Immigrants ===
The first immigrants to come here were mostly from the Central Sava Valley and moved to this area a few years prior to the Second World War; therefore most of them spoke the Zagorje-Trbovlje subdialect. After the Second World War, people from all over Slovenia started moving to this area. In 1953, only 28% of the population was indigenous, and only 15% in Kočevje. Most of the immigrants were from more densely populated areas, such as around the Mura River (mostly speaking the Prekmurje and Prlekija dialects), northern Lower Carniola (speaking the Lower Carniolan dialect), White Carniola (speaking the North and South White Carniolan dialects), and Inner Carniola (speaking the Inner Carniolan dialect). Many people also moved from around Krško (speaking the Sevnica-Krško subdialect) and Tolmin (speaking the Tolmin and Soča dialects), as well as Croats and Bosnians. Most people, however, moved from larger cities, mainly from Ljubljana (speaking the Upper Carniolan dialect), Maribor (speaking the South Pohorje dialect or Kozjak subdialect), Celje (speaking the Central Savinja dialect), Novo Mesto (speaking the Eastern Lower Carniolan subdialect), Murska Sobota (speaking the Prekmurje Slovene), and Ptuj (speaking the Prlekija dialect).

The vast majority of the immigrants after 1940 were from Ljubljana (28%) and Novo Mesto (15%), accounting for a third of the entire population.

=== Unified dialect ===
People that moved to that area mostly spoke their original dialect or somewhat adapted when speaking with others, and their children already seem to have formed a somewhat unified dialect. The only research on the microdialects spoken here was a bachelor's thesis that focuses on the Kočevje microdialect, and it appears to be very similar to standard Slovene with similarities to the Upper Carniolan dialect, such as no diphthongs, ukanye, the ending -u instead of -i in dative/locative singular o-stems, and very prominent vowel reduction, especially for the endings -o and -i. At the same time, it lacks some key features of Lower Carniolan dialects, such as akanye. However, a feature present in (most) Lower Carniolan microdialects and not in Upper Carniolan, no masculinization or feminization, is also listed. The dialect shows clear influence of the Ljubljana microdialect, and possibly also standard Slovene. However, more research is needed to ascertain this.

The author focused on speakers that were in school at that time, which would correlate to speakers born somewhere between 1972 and 1984.

=== Accent changes ===
The bachelor's thesis does not provide stress diacritics, but when researching White Carniolan dialects Tine Logar mentioned that the accent shifts *məglȁ → *mə̀gla, *sěnȏ / *prosȏ → *sě̀no / *pròso, *visȍk → vìsok, and *kováč → *kòvač are not present "on the other side of the Kočevje forests"; that is, in the Mixed Kočevje subdialects, which would be reasonable because neither the Lower Carniolan nor Upper Carniolan dialects have undergone these accent shifts. The dialects have probably undergone the *ženȁ → *žèna accent shift because only some marginal northern and western dialects have not undergone it and speakers from those dialects were not in any of the major groups of immigrants. The subdialects differentiate between long and short vowels, but they do not have pitch accent.

=== Morphology ===
The unified dialect shows typical features of colloquial speech, such as the short infinitive instead of long, the infinitive ending in -či now has the suffix -t, the locative singular has merged with the dative, pəsa instead of psa (final accent became fixed), and many masculine nouns became t-stems, but the dual and neuter gender still exist.

== Bibliography ==
- Šekli, Matej (2018). Legan Ravnikar, Andreja (ed.). Topologija lingvogenez slovanskih jezikov (in Slovenian). Translated by Plotnikova, Anastasija. Ljubljana: Znanstvenoraziskovalni center SAZU. ISBN 978-961-05-0137-4.
- Abramovič, Irena; Pogorelc, Breda (1990). Kočevski govor : diplomska naloga (in Slovenian). Ljubljana.
