= North White Carniolan dialect =

Slovene dialect spoken in northern White Carniola

- Native to: Slovenia
- Region: Northern part of White Carniola, northern from Dobliče and Griblje.
- Ethnicity: Slovenes
- Language family: Indo-European: Balto-Slavic; Slavic; South Slavic; Western South Slavic; Slovene; Lower Carniolan dialect group; North White Carniolan dialect
- Dialects: Šokarji microdialects (western); Microdialects around Metlika (eastern)

Language codes
- ISO 639-3: –
- North White Carniolan dialect

The North White Carniolan dialect (Slovene: severnobelokranjsko narečje [sɛvɛɾnɔbɛlɔˈkɾàːnskɔ naˈɾéːt͡ʃjɛ], Serbo-Croatian: sjevernobelokrajinsko narječje) is a Slovene dialect spoken in White Carniola north of Dobliče and Griblje. The dialect was partially influenced by immigrants of Serbo-Croatian origin that moved to this area in the 15th and 16th centuries. The dialect borders the Lower Carniolan dialect to the north, Mixed Kočevje subdialects to the west, and South White Carniolan dialect to the south, as well as Prigorje and Goran Kajkavian to the east and Eastern Herzegovinian Shtokavian to the northeast. The dialect belongs to the Lower Carniolan dialect group, and it evolved from Lower Carniolan dialect base.

== Geographical distribution ==
The border between the South and North White Carniolan dialects is rather clear; it was already defined by Tine Logar. It follows the line from Jelševnik to Krasinec, but runs a bit south of Črnomelj. The borders with other Slovene dialects are also geographical borders; the Gorjanci Hills correspond to the border with the Lower Carniolan dialect, and the Kočevje Rog Plateau with the mixed Kočevje subdialects. The border between Slovene and Serbo–Croatian is deemed to follow national borders. Notable settlements include Stražnji Vrh, Črnomelj, Ručetna Vas, Semič, Gradac, Metlika, and Radovica.

== History ==
White Carniola was inhabited by Slovenes after the 13th century, and even then it was quite remote from other Slovenes on the Kočevje Rog Plateau to the west and in the Gorjanci Hills to the north. The immigration of the Gottschee Germans left the Slovenes even more closely connected to Croatia. However, they still maintained contact with other Slovenes that lived on the other side of the Gorjanci Hills to the north. Differentiation between the North and South White Carniolan dialects occurred in the 15th and 16th centuries, when the Ottomans started attacking Bosnia and Dalmatia. Because of this, White Carniolans started moving north of the Gorjanci Hills, and the mostly cleared region of southern White Carniola, especially along the Kolpa River, was newly inhabited by immigrants from Serbia, Bosnia and Herzegovina, and Croatia. The White Carniolan dialect then formed from a mix of the old White Carniolan dialect, Serbo-Croatian dialects, and dialects from newly settled Slovenes after the Ottoman invasions. Serbo-Croatian influence was the most prominent in the south, whereas in the north it had negligible influence. Therefore, today the White Carniolan dialect is split based on how much influence it received from Serbo-Croatian.

== Accentual changes ==
The dialect lost the difference between high- and low-pitched accent, both on long and short vowels, which are still differentiated. It also underwent six accentual changes, which are also present in South White Carniolan: *ženȁ → *žèna, *məglȁ → *mə̀gla, *sěnȏ / *prosȏ → *sě̀no / *pròso, *visȍk → vìsok, and *kováč → *kòvač.

== Phonology ==
Serbo-Croatian immigrants altered the dialect to a much lesser extent than in the South White Carniolan dialect. There are some partially altered microdialects, but most of them are more or less unaltered. All vowel changes are expected for a Slovene dialect, and vowel reduction is present. The Slovenian linguist Jože Toporišič even states that there was no early mixing with Croatian in this dialect.

Alpine Slavic *ě̄ and non-final *ě̀ evolved into ḙː around Semič and into ẹː elsewhere. The vowel *ō evolved into uː. Non-final *è and *ę̀, as well as *ē and *ę̄, evolved into iːe in the west and into ẹː in the east. Similarly, *ǭ and non-final *ò and *ǫ̀ evolved into uːo in the west and into ọː in the east. Syllabic *ł̥̄ and non-final *ł̥̀ evolved into oːu̯ or uː in the west, and, apart from Metlika and north of that, where oːu̯ is pronounced, ọː in the east. Non-final *ù and *ū evolved into uː, and in the past üː was also present in the west.

Newly accented e and o after the *ženȁ → *žèna shift became the diphthongs i̯eː/i̯e and u̯o/u̯a, respectively, in the west, and eː and oː/ọː, respectively, in the east. Newly stressed *a and *e in the Črnomelj microdialect turned into ə, and j appeared before i.

Before the stress, the vowels *i and *u evolved into e̥, and *a commonly turns into ə. Akanye is not common. After the stress, the vowel *o evolved into ȯ and *i into e̥. In Črnomelj, unstressed *i turned into ė. Diphthongs *ej and *aj simplified into i.

Short vowels also simplified in closed syllables, i turned into e̥, *u into ȯ, o or e̥, and a into ḁ. In Črnomelj, short *i and *i followed by *r simplified into ə.

Velar *ł was retained in the southeastern microdialects, and palatal consonants remained palatal in some microdialects, particularly those in the east.

== Morphology ==
The dialect retained neuter gender, but it lost dual forms. Adjectives are mainly compared periphrastically, but all suffixes are still occasionally in use. The long infinitive was replaced by the short infinitive ending in -t (both instead of -ti or -i). Participles in -č, -e, and -(v)ši are not in use anymore, and the gerund is also rarely used. The pluperfect is not in use anymore, and the preterite and future forms are expressed with biti + l-participle.

The instrumental plural was replaced by locative plural forms in the eastern microdialects.

== Vocabulary ==
The vocabulary of the Črnomelj microdialect was collected by Janez Kramarič and published in Slovar črnomaljskega narečnega govora.

== Bibliography ==
- Logar, Tine (1996). Kenda-Jež, Karmen (ed.). Dialektološke in jezikovnozgodovinske razprave [Dialectological and etymological discussions] (in Slovenian). Ljubljana: Znanstvenoraziskovalni center SAZU, Inštitut za slovenski jezik Frana Ramovša. ISBN 961-6182-18-8.
- Šekli, Matej (2018). Legan Ravnikar, Andreja (ed.). Topologija lingvogenez slovanskih jezikov (in Slovenian). Translated by Plotnikova, Anastasija. Ljubljana: Znanstvenoraziskovalni center SAZU. ISBN 978-961-05-0137-4.
