= Kumrova Vas =

- Location in Slovenia
- Coordinates: 45°34′59.27″N 15°0′31.98″E
- Country: Slovenia
- Traditional region: Lower Carniola
- Statistical region: Southeast Slovenia
- Municipality: Kočevje
- Elevation: 767.4 m (2,518 ft)

Population (2012)
  - Total: 0

Kumrova Vas (pronounced [ˈkuːmɾɔʋa ˈʋaːs]; Slovene: Kumrova vas or Kumrovo, German: Kummerdorf or Kummersdorf, Gottscheerish: Kümmrdoarf) is a remote abandoned settlement in the Municipality of Kočevje in southern Slovenia. The area is part of the traditional region of Lower Carniola and is now included in the Southeast Slovenia Statistical Region. Its territory is now part of the village of Svetli Potok.

== Name ==
Both the Slovene name Kumrova vas and German name Kummer(s)dorf literally mean 'Kummer village'. It has been suggested that the root Kummer is related to the dialect world Kümar 'impoverished, pitiable person' or to the surname Kummer. The possible designation of the settlement as an impoverished place to live is similar to the naming of the settlements of Slaba Gorica ('poor hill'), Sušje ('dry, drought'), and Verderb ('deterioration').

== History ==
Kumrova Vas was a Gottschee German village. In the land registry of 1574, the settlement had three full farms divided into six half-farms and nine owners, corresponding to a population between 32 and 36. In the 1770 census there were 13 houses in the village. The village had a maximum population of 87 people in 14 houses in 1869. In the 19th century, the village had a small industry making woolen coats. On the eve of the Second World War, Kumrova Vas had 10 houses and a population of 32. At the time, the economy of the village was based on agriculture, raising livestock, and peddling. The original ethnic German population, consisting of 25 people from nine families, was evicted early in the war. The village was burned repeatedly by Italian troops between May and August 1942. In late June 1942, the Yugoslav Partisans established their Medical Dressing Station No. 3 here for a week before relocating it to a forestry cabin at Travnik Hill in Kočevski Rog. The village was never rebuilt after the war.

== Religious heritage ==
A church dedicated to the Holy Name of Jesus stood to the east above Kumrova Vas, dating from 1708. The site was first used as a fortification during the Ottoman wars in Europe, and was later converted into a church. The year 1798, marking a renovation of the church, was carved into the semicircular entryway. The shingled roof of the bell tower burned during a lightning strike in 1865. The church had three altars by the mid-18th century, dedicated to the Holy Name of Jesus, Christ on the Via Dolorosa, and Christ on the Mount of Olives. The church was remodeled in 1933. The church was not repaired after the war and its furnishings disappeared. The location of the church's statues and paintings is unknown today.

A small chapel dedicated to the Precious Blood stood northeast of the village. It had a polygonal chancel walled on three sides and a wooden bell-cot over the entrance. Two bells, cast in 1607 and 1839, hung in the bell-cot until 1917. The smaller one bore the inscription Zur Ehre Gottes goß mich Elias Sombrath in Laibach 1603 ('I was cast for the glory of God by Elias Sombrath in Ljubljana, 1603'). The chapel was destroyed during the Second World War and was not rebuilt.

== Notable people ==
Notable people that were born or lived in Kumrova Vas include:

- Josef Stalzer, a well-known hermit from Staro Brezje, who lived in a cell near the church from 1837 to 1855
