= Miklarji =

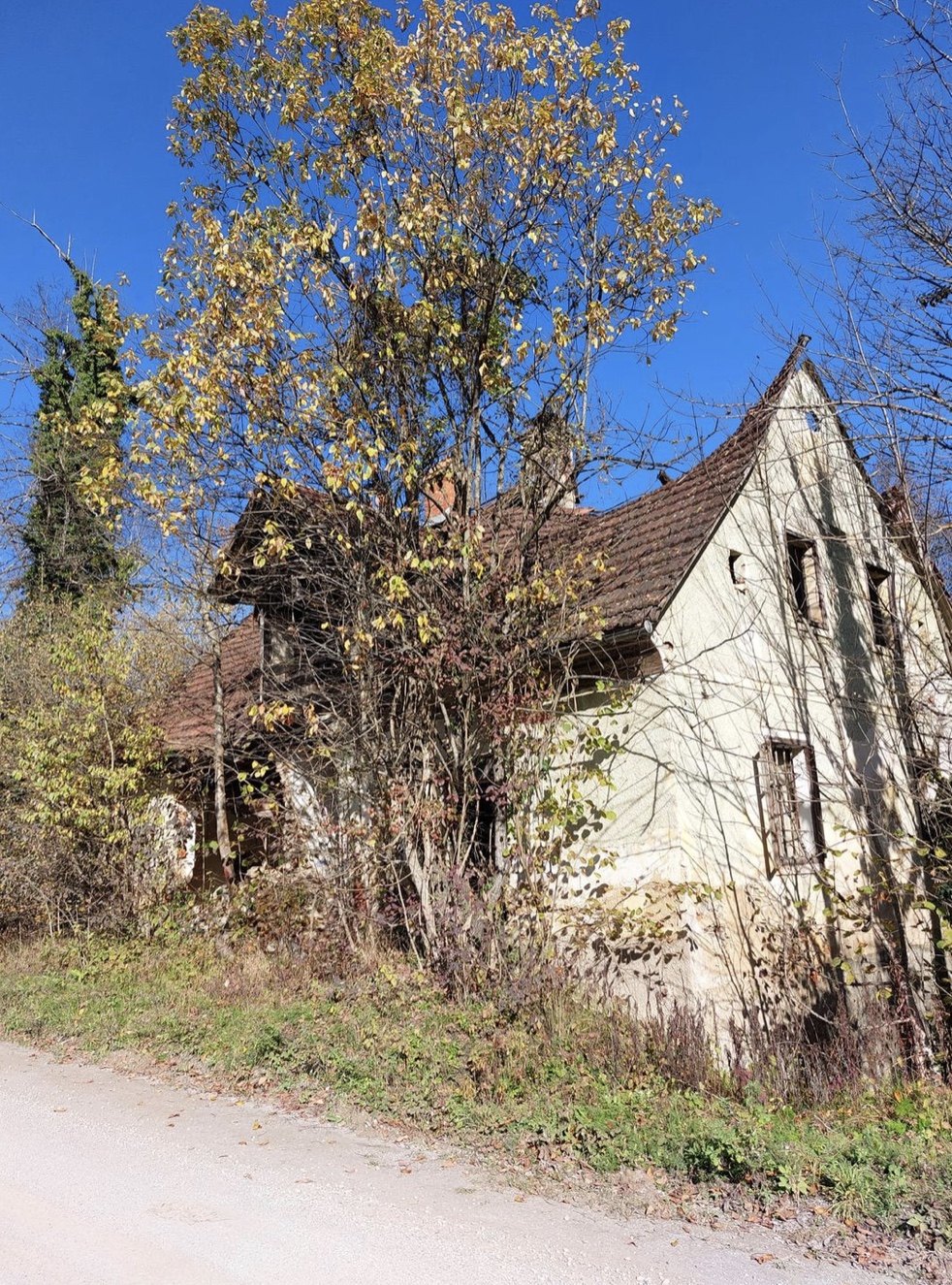
- Abandoned house in Miklarji

- Location in Slovenia
- Coordinates: 45°33′28.03″N 15°5′55″E
- Country: Slovenia
- Traditional region: White Carniola
- Statistical region: Southeast Slovenia
- Municipality: Črnomelj

Area
  - Total: 1.6 km^{2} (0.62 sq mi)
- Elevation: 536.8 m (1,761 ft)

Population (2012)
  - Total: 0

Miklarji (pronounced [ˈmiːklaɾji]; also Miklarje; German: Brunngeräuth, Gottscheerish: Prunngreit) is a small remote settlement in the hills west of Črnomelj in the White Carniola area of southeastern Slovenia. It no longer has any permanent residents. The area is part of the traditional region of Lower Carniola and is now included in the Southeast Slovenia Statistical Region.

== Name ==
The Slovene name Miklarji is a plural form. Such toponyms are generally derived from the names of local inhabitants and, in the case of Miklarji, the name is connected with the Miklar farm. Similar plural place names in the Kočevje region include Cvišlerji, Koblarji, and Štalcerji. The root of the Slovene name, Mikl-, is believed to be of German origin, named for the first settler in the area, Mik(e)l (< Middle High German michel 'large'). The settlement's standard German name Brunngeräuth literally means 'clearing with a spring'.

== History ==
Miklarji was a Gottschee German settlement. It was founded as a hunting lodge belonging to the Auersperg noble family. The bandit known as "Brause from the Miklar Farm" (Slovene: Miklarski Brause) once had a cabin in the area. The Partisan units in White Carniola set up their first camp in the forest outside the village in July 1941. In 1953 the Loka Hunting Club placed a memorial plaque on the wall of a house used by a forestry worker to commemorate two fallen soldiers. The house had been used in 1942 for convalescence for patients from the Partisans' Bobovec Hospital. In 1959 the Partisan Veterans Association renovated the dwelling used by the Partisans during the war and added another plaque to the house.
