= Štale =

- Location in Slovenia
- Coordinates: 45°39′34.57″N 15°3′55.41″E
- Country: Slovenia
- Traditional region: Lower Carniola
- Statistical region: Southeast Slovenia
- Municipality: Semič
- Elevation: 730.1 m (2,395 ft)

Population (2002)
  - Total: 0

Štale (pronounced [ˈʃtaːlɛ]; German: Stalldorf) is a remote abandoned settlement in the Municipality of Semič in southern Slovenia. The area is part of the traditional region of Lower Carniola and is now included in the Southeast Slovenia Statistical Region. Its territory is now part of the village of Komarna Vas.

== History ==
Štale was a Gottschee German village. In 1574 it consisted of one full farm and two half farms. In 1931 the settlement had 11 houses. The original inhabitants were expelled in the fall of 1941. The village was burned by Italian troops in the summer of 1942 during the Rog Offensive and it was never rebuilt.

== Cultural heritage ==
- A monument to the settlement of the Gottschee Germans on Pogorelec Hill stands in the forest southwest of Štale and south of the former Gottschee German village of Gače. It is a stone pillar that was erected in 1930 in commemoration of the 600th anniversary of Gottschee German settlement.
