= Lower Carniolan dialect =

Slovene dialect spoken in northern Lower Carniola

- dolenjsko narečje
- Pronunciation: [dɔˈlɛ̀ːi̯jnsku naˈɾɛ́ːi̯t͡ʃjɛ]
- Native to: Slovenia
- Region: Northern Lower Carniola
- Ethnicity: Slovenes
- Language family: Indo-European: Balto-Slavic; Slavic; South Slavic; Western South Slavic; Slovene; Lower Carniolan dialect group; Lower Carniolan dialect
- Dialects: Eastern Lower Carniolan subdialect

Language codes
- ISO 639-3: –
- Lower Carniolan dialect with Eastern Lower Carniolan subdialect

The Lower Carniolan dialect (Slovene: dolenjsko narečje [dɔˈlèːnskɔ naˈɾéːt͡ʃjɛ], dolenjščina) is a major Slovene dialect in the Lower Carniolan dialect group. It is one of the two central Slovene dialects and was the original foundation for standard Slovene along with the Ljubljana urban dialect. It is spoken in most of Lower Carniola, but not in the southern part (it is not spoken in towns such as Babno Polje, Kočevje, and Semič), and it also includes settlements in eastern Inner Carniola. The dialect borders the Upper Carniolan dialect to the north, the Lower Sava Valley dialect to the east, Eastern Herzegovian Shtokavian and the North White Carniolan dialect to the southeast, the Mixed Kočevje subdialects to the south, the Čabranka dialect to the southwest, the Inner Carniolan dialect to the west, and the Horjul dialect to the northwest. The eastern part of the dialect is the Eastern Lower Carniolan subdialect. The dialect belongs to the Lower Carniolan dialect group, and it evolved from the Lower Carniolan dialect base.

== Geographical distribution ==
The area where the Lower Carniolan dialect is spoken spans from the Javornik Hills and Snežnik Plateau in the west to Orehovec, Škocjan, and Polšnik in the east, and to the Sava River and Ljubljana Marsh in the north. In the southeast, the border goes along the Gorjanci Mountains, in the south roughly past the area where the Gottschee Germans used to live, and in the southwest it extends almost to the national border, but places like Babno Polje and Lazec already speak the Čabranka dialect. Notable settlements include Cerknica, Stari Trg pri Ložu, Sodražica, Ribnica, Velike Lašče, Borovnica, Ig, Škofljica, Grosuplje, Turjak, Šmartno pri Litiji, Ivančna Gorica, Žužemberk, Dolenjske Toplice, Novo Mesto, Mirna Peč, Mirna, Šentrupert, Mokronog, Trebelno, Škocjan, Šmarješke Toplice, and Šentjernej. The subdialect border roughly follows the line Vinja Vas–Češča Vas–Dobrnič–Račje Selo–Tihaboj–Zaloka.

Historically it was also spoken in Ljubljana because in the past the Ljubljana dialect displayed features more similar with the Lower Carniolan dialect group. However, it gradually grew closer to the Upper Carniola dialect group as a consequence of migration from Upper Carniola into Ljubljana in the 19th and 20th centuries. Ljubljana mostly expanded to the north, gradually incorporating many villages that were historically part of Upper Carniola, and so its dialect shifted closer to the Upper Carniolan dialects.

== Accentual changes ==
The Lower Carniolan dialect is the most archaic dialect in the Lower Carniolan dialect group because it has undergone only the *ženȁ → *žèna accent shift and partially the *məglȁ → *mə̀gla accent shift, whereas other dialects have undergone five or even more, with an exception being the Mixed Kočevje subdialects. It has also retained pitch accent and has relatively well-preserved quantitative differences between long and short syllables. The long acute on final syllables remains acute only around Ribnica, Sodražica, Ig, and Grosuplje. In other parts, the acute starts to turn into a circumflex accent, but this is mostly limited to specific endings. In the dialect, change also occurs outside of endings, and in the south, around Novo Mesto, it has generally turned into a circumflex. Around Žužemberk, the accent did not change into a circumflex, but instead both accents neutralized.

== Phonology ==
The modern dialect mostly retained the same pronunciation of long vowels as in the Lower Carniolan dialect base. Non-final *ě̀ and *ě̄ are the diphthong ēi̯, which turned into āi̯ in the southwestern and southern part and might have monophthongized into ē or ǟ elsewhere, particularly in the northeast. Alpine Slavic and later lengthened *ę̄ and *ē turned into iẹ, *ǭ and non-final *ò turned into uọ, and long *ō turned into ū. In the dialect, *ī and *ū turned into ī̧ and ū̧, īi̯ and ūu̯, or ēi̯ and ōu̯, respectively. In some microdialects, particularly in Dry Carniola, *ū is pronounced as i̯ū. Elsewhere, *ū is pronounced as ǖ by older generations and as ū by younger generations. In the central area, *ā preceded by *ń or *ĺ turned into *e and then followed the same changes as newly stressed *e. Syllabic *r̥̄ turned into ə̄r, which might also be more a-like. Syllabic *ł̥̄ turned into ou̯. Newly stressed *e and *o mostly diphthongized into ēi̯ and ōu̯ in the east and west, but changes differently in the central area. Newly stressed *e opened up to jā around Ribnica, whereas *o closed into ọ̄ around Žužemberk, Ribnica, and Ig, or became a diphthong ūo around Velike Lašče.

Word-final short *o turned into u (ukanye), in the north further reducing into ə, or even disappeared. Akanye is also common; it is present in all positions in the northern and central microdialects and in all positions except after labial and velar consonants in the northeastern microdialects, where it changes into u. Elsewhere, it mostly appears in close syllables after the stress. In parts where akanye is present in all positions, change of *a into e after palatal consonants was also present, but that change is being abandoned by younger generations. In the north, *i and *u reduced into a somewhat lighter ə.

Palatal *ĺ mostly turned into l, except in some eastern microdialects, where it is pronounced as jl. In contrast, palatal *ń turned into j east of Dobrepolje; elsewhere it turned into jn after a vowel and depalatalized into n after a consonant or at the beginning of a word. Around Velike Lašče and Bloke, elderly speakers pronounce it as j̃ between two vowels. Shvapanye (*ł → u̯) is present only in a small area south of Ljubljana; elsewhere *ł remained intact. The cluster *šč did not simplify, *čre and *žre simplified in the north and west, a bit less frequently elsewhere, the new cluster *tj simplified into k (PS tьja̋ → Alpine Slovene tjà → ke), and *tl and *dl in the l-participle simplified into *l.

== Morphology ==
The long infinitive turned into the short infinitive, except on the eastern border. The neuter gender mostly remained neuter, but partial masculinization occurs in the north.

== Subdivision ==
The eastern part of the Lower Carniolan dialect has some distinctive features that differentiate it from other parts of the dialect. Tonal accent is more or less lost on last syllables, and there is a partial *məglȁ → *mə̀gla shift. Yat (*ě̄) monophthongized, *ī and *ū widened or diphthongized, and there is a higher degree of vowel reduction.

== Bibliography ==
- Rigler, Jakob (2001). "1: Jezikovnozgodovinske in dialektološke razprave" [1: Linguohistorical and dialectological discussions]. In Smole, Vera (ed.). Zbrani spisi / Jakob Rigler [Collected essays / Jakob Rigler] (in Slovenian). Vol. 1. Ljubljana: Založba ZRC. ISBN 961-6358-32-4.
- Šekli, Matej (2018). Legan Ravnikar, Andreja (ed.). Topologija lingvogenez slovanskih jezikov (in Slovenian). Translated by Plotnikova, Anastasija. Ljubljana: Znanstvenoraziskovalni center SAZU. ISBN 978-961-05-0137-4.
