= Niko Županič =

Slovenian ethnologist and politician (1876 – 1961)

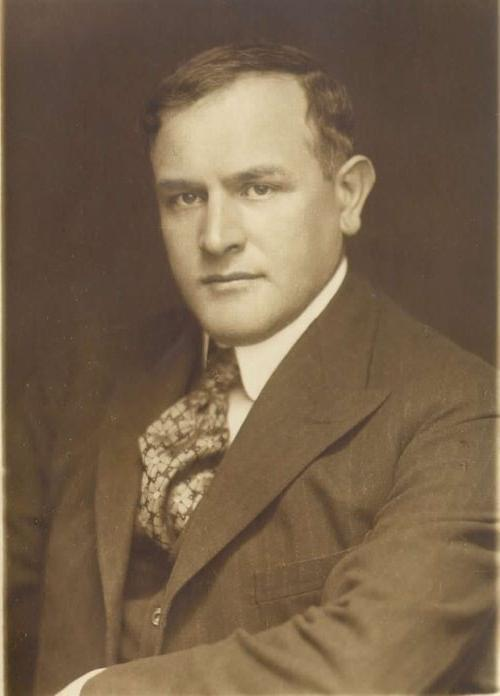
- by Veličan Bešter, 1921
- Born: 1 December 1876; Griblje, Carniola, Austria-Hungary (now Slovenia)
- Died: 11 September 1961 (aged 84); Ljubljana, Yugoslavia (now Slovenia)
- Occupations: Ethnologist, politician
- Political party: People's Radical Party

Niko Županič (Griblje, 1 December 1876 – Ljubljana, 11 September 1961) was a professor of ethnology at the University of Ljubljana. Upon outbreak of the World War I, he moved to Niš, Serbia and joined the censorship office of the Royal Serbian Army. He was a member of the Yugoslav Committee, an ad-hoc group of politicians and activists supporting political unification of the South Slavs in 1915–1919, and a representative of the newly established Kingdom of Serbs, Croats and Slovenes at the Paris Peace Conference in 1919–1920. Županič joined the People's Radical Party and became the president of its regional committee for Slovenia. In 1922–1923, Županič served as the minister without portfolio in the government led by prime minister Nikola Pašić. Županič was the founder and the first principal of the Ljubljana-based Slovenian Ethnographic Museum (in 1923). In 1926, he started publication of ethnological journal Etnolog in Ljubljana.

His works include:

- Žumberčani i Marindolci – Žumberčani in Marindolci (1912)
- Bela Srbija (on White Serbia, hypothesised ancestral land of the Serbs, 1922)
- Prvobitni Hrvati (on origin of the Croats, 1925)
- Šišano kumstvo u Beloj krajini – Nastrižno kumstvo na Belokranjskem (1950)
