= Inlauf =

- Location in Slovenia
- Coordinates: 45°32′23.76″N 14°46′54.49″E
- Country: Slovenia
- Traditional region: Lower Carniola
- Statistical region: Southeast Slovenia
- Municipality: Kočevje
- Elevation: 735.8 m (2,414 ft)

Population (2002)
  - Total: none

Inlauf (pronounced [ˈiːnlau̯f]; in older sources also Inavf or Innlauf, German: Inlauf, Gottscheerish: Inlaf, Enlaf) is a remote settlement in the Municipality of Kočevje in southern Slovenia. The area is part of the traditional region of Lower Carniola and is now included in the Southeast Slovenia Statistical Region. Its territory is now part of the village of Borovec pri Kočevski Reki.

== Name ==
The Slovene name of the settlement is derived from the identical standard German name, Inlauf. It was also called Inlaf or Enlaf in Gottscheerish. The name is derived from Einlauf 'inlet, entry'. German place names suffixed with -lauf, such as Inlauf, are frequently associated with flowing water, and Briga Creek (Slovene: Briški potok), a losing stream, has its origin at Inlauf. In 1943 the name Innlauf, based on the Gottschee German village, was proposed as a new Germanized name for Površje, which had been designated for German resettlement.

== History ==
In the land registry of 1574, Inlauf had four full farms, two of which were divided into four half-farms, corresponding to a population between 35 and 40. Before the Second World War, Inlauf had 15 houses and a population of 63. The economy of the village was based on farming, gathering berries, and transporting lumber and logs. After the war, a Yugoslav labor camp for political prisoners operated in the village from 1952 to 1955.

== Chapel ==
There used to be a chapel dedicated to Saints Cosmas and Damian at the southeastern end of Inlauf. It had a rectangular nave, a belfry projecting from the front of the building, and an octagonal chancel that was walled on five sides. It dated from the second half of the 18th century and was first mentioned in a military report from 1763–1787; the belfry bore the year 1808 and one of the bells was dated 1799. The chapel had one altar. A postwar Yugoslav labor camp was located next to the chapel and used the belfry as a watchtower. When the camp was closed down, the chapel and belfry were also destroyed.
