= Gače =

- Location in Slovenia
- Coordinates: 45°39′18.56″N 15°5′11.49″E
- Country: Slovenia
- Traditional region: Lower Carniola
- Statistical region: Southeast Slovenia
- Municipality: Semič
- Elevation: 929.1 m (3,048 ft)

Population (2002)
  - Total: 0

Gače (pronounced [ˈɡaːtʃɛ]; German: Gatschen, Gottscheerish: Gatschn) is a remote abandoned settlement in the Municipality of Semič in southern Slovenia. The area is part of the traditional region of Lower Carniola and is now included in the Southeast Slovenia Statistical Region. Its territory is now part of the village of Komarna Vas and it is registered as a cultural heritage site.

== Name ==
The origin of the name Gače is uncertain. Petschauer suggests that the name is derived from Slovene kača 'snake'. However, Bezlaj derives this and similar names (e.g., Gačnik) from Slovene gat 'weir, dike, barrier', generally referring to a barrier that water spills over. In the past the German name was Gatschen.

== History ==
Gače was a Gottschee German village. The settlement was not mentioned in the land registries of 1574 or 1770, but it does appear in the Črmošnjice land registry of 1754. The settlement had four houses with 18 residents in 1880, and reached its peak population in 1890 (20 people). After this, the population declined to seven in 1900, and only one in 1910. Gače was abandoned before the First World War. The ruins of the village mayor's house were partially restored in 1995. Gače has been used for skiing since before the Second World War, and the Gače ski center now operates at Gače.

== Cultural heritage ==
Two monuments in Gače are registered as cultural heritage:

- A monument to the settlement of the Gottschee Germans stands in a meadow at the former site of the village of Gače. It is a stone pillar with a dedication to the former village that was erected in 1930 in commemoration of the 600th anniversary of Gottschee German settlement. It was restored in 1992.
- A monument to the settlement of the Gottschee Germans on Pogorelec Hill stands in the forest southwest of the former Gottschee German village of Štale (German: Stalldorf) and south of Gače. It is a stone pillar that was erected in 1930 in commemoration of the 600th anniversary of Gottschee German settlement.
