= Kočevske Poljane =

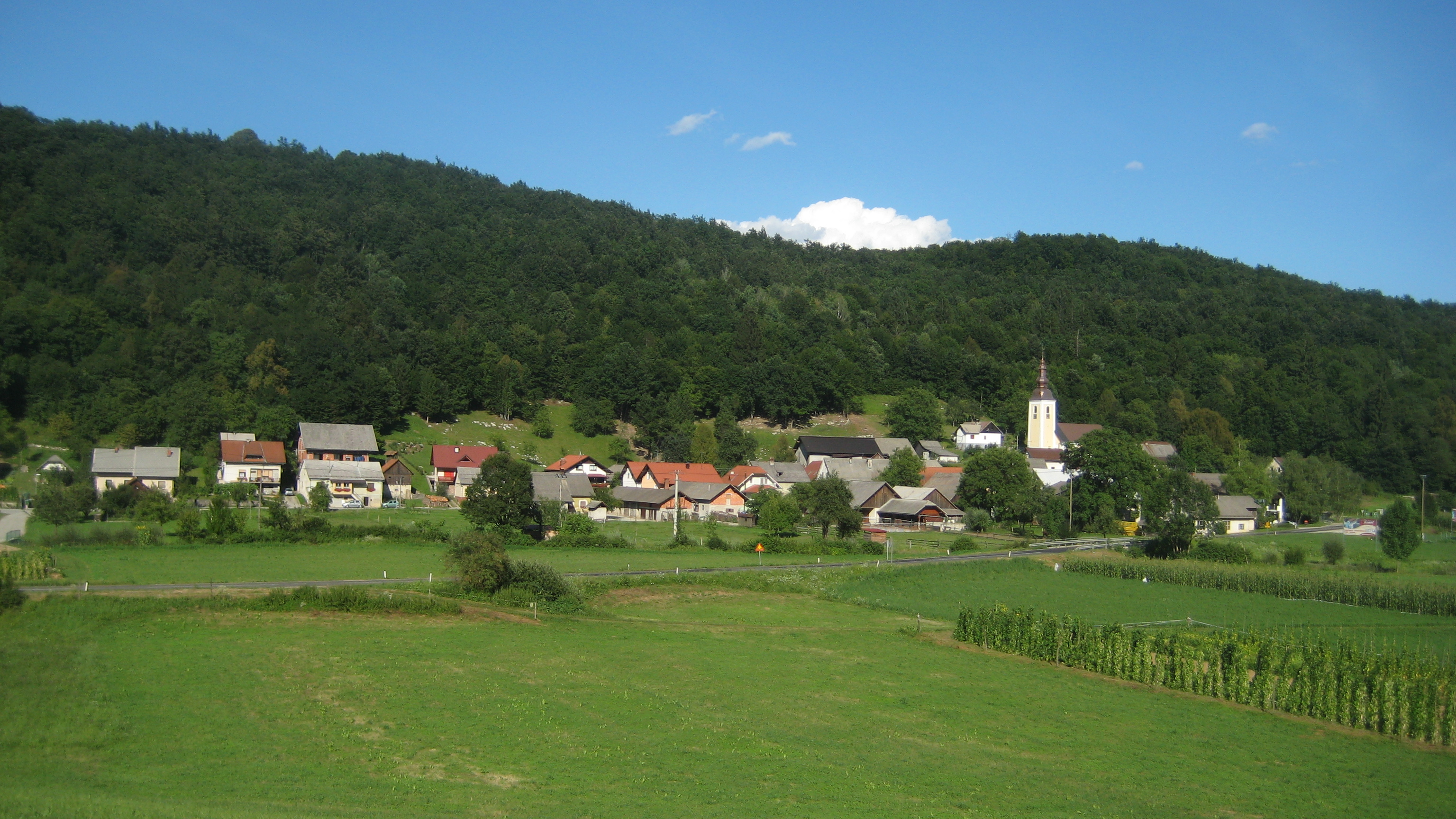

- Location in Slovenia
- Coordinates: 45°43′29.04″N 15°3′18.82″E
- Country: Slovenia
- Traditional region: Lower Carniola
- Statistical region: Southeast Slovenia
- Municipality: Dolenjske Toplice

Area
  - Total: 2.59 km^{2} (1.00 sq mi)
- Elevation: 187.9 m (616 ft)

Population (2020)
  - Total: 86
  - Density: 33/km^{2} (86/sq mi)

Kočevske Poljane (pronounced [kɔˈtʃeu̯ːskɛ pɔˈljaːnɛ]; German: Pöllandl) is a village in the Municipality of Dolenjske Toplice in Slovenia. The area is part of the historical region of Lower Carniola. The municipality is now included in the Southeast Slovenia Statistical Region. The village includes the hamlets of Gorica (German: Büchel or Büchel bei Pöllandl) and Trnovec (or Trnje; German: Dornachberg).

== Name ==
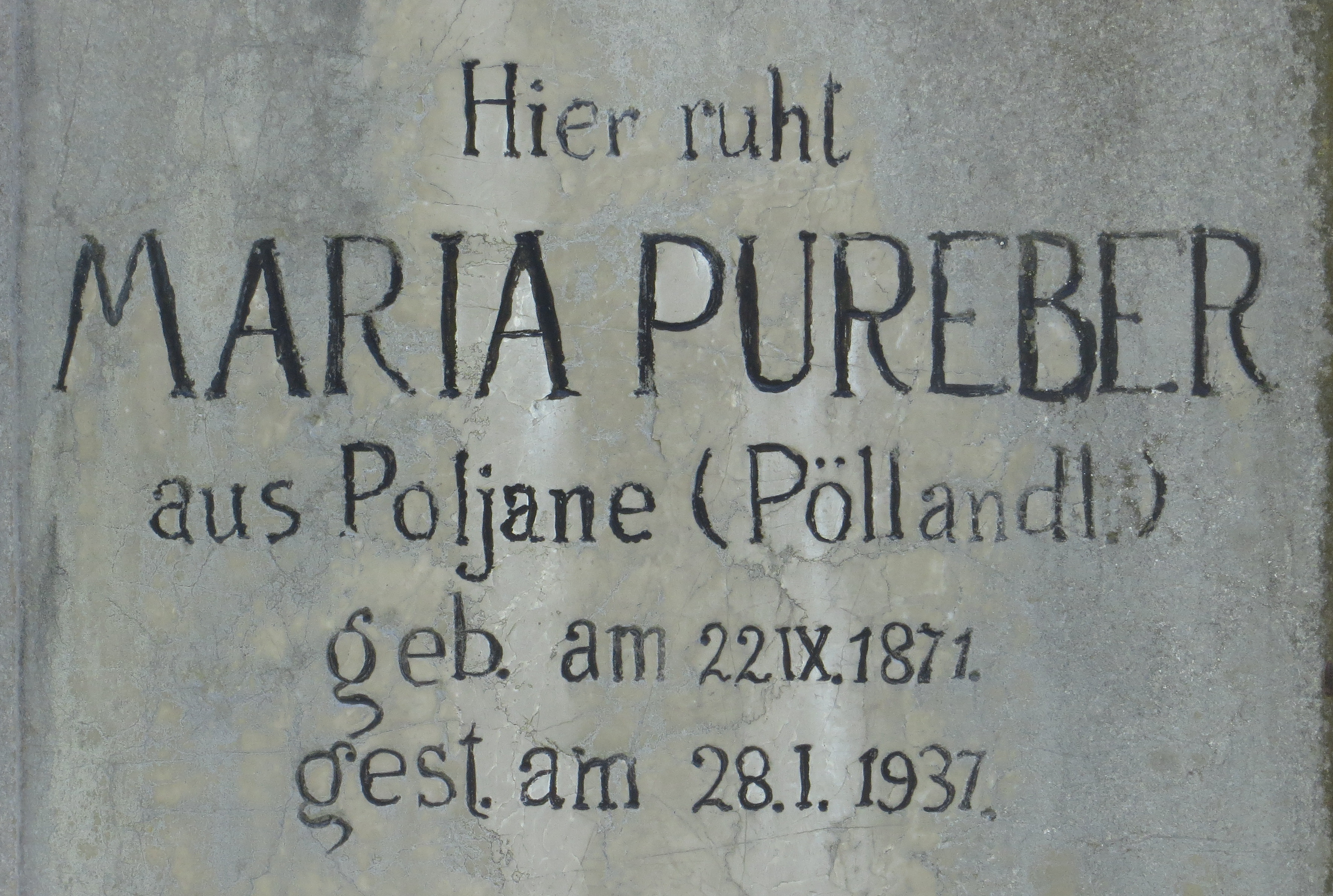
Gravestone detail with the Slovene and German names of the village

The name of the settlement was changed from Poljane to Kočevske Poljane in 1953. In the past the German name was Pöllandl.

== History ==
Pöllandl was a village settled by Gottschee Germans inside the Gottschee region until 1941. During the Second World War its original population was resettled by the German authorities. However, some Gottscheer families managed to resist and prevent expulsion, and most of these collaborated with the Partisans of the Liberation Front of the Slovene People, which had a base (Baza 20) nearby. Their dialect Gottscheerish was forbidden after World War II, and so today there are only a few people left that speak it.

== Church ==
The local parish church is dedicated to Saint Andrew and belongs to the Roman Catholic Diocese of Novo Mesto. It dates to the 17th century. A second church belonging to the parish, built just north of the settlement in the hamlet of Gorica, is dedicated to Mary Help of Christians and was a pilgrimage church built in the late 17th century. The cemetery is one of only ten in the Kočevje region to have (mostly) preserved the tombstones of the Gottschee Germans.

== Notable people ==
Notable people that were born or lived in Kočevske Poljane include the following:

- August Schauer (1872–1941), parish priest at Koprivnik for over 30 years and editor of the Gottscheer Kalender (Gottschee Almanac) from 1925 to 1941
