= Ravne, Kočevje =

Ravne
- Location in Slovenia
- Coordinates: 45°33′24.93″N 14°46′23.00″E
- Country: Slovenia
- Traditional region: Lower Carniola
- Statistical region: Southeast Slovenia
- Municipality: Kočevje
- Elevation: 746.8 m (2,450 ft)

Population (2002)
  - Total: none

Ravne (pronounced [ˈɾáːwnɛ]; German: Eben; Gottscheerish: Ebn, Ebnə) is a remote settlement in the Municipality of Kočevje in southern Slovenia. The area is part of the traditional region of Lower Carniola and is now included in the Southeast Slovenia Statistical Region. Its territory is now part of the village of Borovec pri Kočevski Reki.

== Name ==
Ravne is a relatively common name for places in Slovenia (cf. Ravne, Ravne, Ravne na Koroškem, etc.). The name literally means 'level' and is of adjectival origin, usually an ellipsis of ravne njive 'level fields', referring to a small elongated cultivated terrace. The German name Eben is semantically identical, meaning 'level' and referring to cultivation of the land.

== History ==
In 1498 Ravne had three full farms divided into half-farms, corresponding to a population between 35 and 40. In 1770 the village had 13 houses. One of the executed ringleaders of the 1809 Gottscheer Rebellion was from Ravne. The village had 18 houses and a population of 47 in 1937. Ravne had a steam-powered sawmill, which was burned down during the Second World War. The village came under aerial bombardment during the war. After the war the Posestvo Snežnik company had a barn for cattle in Ravne.

== Pilgrimage chapel and shrine ==
A forest pilgrimage chapel known as Our Lady of the Woods (German: Maria im Walde) was built between Eben and Borovec pri Kočevski Reki in 1905 at the site of the Eben Shrine (German: Ebener Bild or Ebner Bild, Gottscheerish: Ēbmar pillain), a popular wayside shrine. The church was built as a result of the 1855 cholera epidemic, during which the residents of Borovec pri Kočevski Reki would trek to the summit of Ravne Hill (German: Ebner Berg, 846 m) and the priest mentioned that a small church could be built where there was a shrine with an image of Our Lady of the Seven Sorrows, probably erected around 1440 or 1450 along a route to Rijeka for pack animals. The chapel was 10.5 m long, 5.5 m wide, and 15 m tall, topped by a flèche with two bells. It was built of undressed stone. The construction began on 5 July 1905 and the chapel was consecrated on 17 September 1905. The chapel was destroyed during the Second World War.
