= Zapudje =

- Location in Slovenia
- Coordinates: 45°30′5.3″N 15°9′46.35″E
- Country: Slovenia
- Traditional region: White Carniola
- Statistical region: Southeast Slovenia
- Municipality: Črnomelj

Area
  - Total: 13.54 km^{2} (5.23 sq mi)
- Elevation: 272.8 m (895 ft)

Population (2020)
  - Total: 76
  - Density: 5.6/km^{2} (15/sq mi)
- Postal code: 8343

Zapudje (pronounced [zaˈpuːdjɛ]) is a village in the hills south of Dragatuš in the Municipality of Črnomelj in the White Carniola area of southeastern Slovenia. The area is part of the traditional region of Lower Carniola and is now included in the Southeast Slovenia Statistical Region. It includes the hamlet of Golek north of the main settlement.

== Geography ==
Zapudje is a clustered village in a small valley with many sinkholes at the foot of Travnik Hill (657 m) and Ušec Hill (also known as Vušec Hill, 616 m). It lies on a side road 3 km from the main road between Črnomelj and Vinica. The location has good insolation and is sheltered from the wind. The soil is rich in humus in the Loke area east of the village, and is loamy and gravelly elsewhere. There is sufficient grazing land to support livestock, and orchards grow well. The village is surrounded by chestnut and beech forests. Škalva Spring on the east slope of Travnik Hill supplies drinking water to the village. Lubešnica (or Lebešnica) Spring is located in a cave southeast of the village, just inside the territory of neighboring Gornji Suhor pri Vinici, but provided water for fieldwork in the Loke area. During flooding, the adjacent Suhor Karst Field is inundated by water from Lubešnica Spring and Gradnica Spring, also located in Gornji Suhor pri Vinici.

== History ==
According to oral tradition, the first settlement in Zapudje was at Sela behind Oberlinec Hill north of the current settlement, but people were driven from the area by bandits. The site is now overgrown with sparse birch and fern woods. The village was recorded as Sabath in the land registry of Poljane in 1576. A vineyard cottage, used to store wine and wheat to maintain St. Peter's Church, was abandoned before the First World War. During the Second World War, because of frequent Partisan activity in the village, Italian forces from Sinji Vrh entered Zapudje, shot eight local men, burned 25 houses and 35 farm buildings, and sent many of the residents to a concentration camp. After the war, 18 houses in the village were renovated. Monuments commemorating the wartime events were set up in the village in 1955 and 1962.

== Church ==
The local church is dedicated to Saint Peter and belongs to the Parish of Dragatuš. It was built in the 18th century and its main altar dates to 1891. Local tradition states that an earlier church, attested in 1526, stood at a different location, where traces of walls are visible. The current church stands in an isolated location north of the hamlet of Golek and is surrounded by a small cemetery. It is a Baroque structure with a rectangular chancel slightly rounded at the end and a rectangular barrel-vaulted nave with pilasters. The interior is painted with brackets and rosettes. The main altar dates from 1891 and was probably the work of Janez Poglajen (based on the initials). The altar painting was created in 1892 by Franc Blaznik. An 1840 painting of Saints Benedict, Peter, and Joseph hangs above the door casing.
