= Draga, Kočevje =

Draga
- Location in Slovenia
- Coordinates: 45°33′52.75″N 14°43′58.76″E
- Country: Slovenia
- Traditional region: Lower Carniola
- Statistical region: Southeast Slovenia
- Municipality: Kočevje
- Elevation: 817.6 m (2,682 ft)

Population (2002)
  - Total: none

Draga (pronounced [ˈdɾaːɡa]; German: Suchen) is a remote abandoned settlement in the Municipality of Kočevje in southern Slovenia. The area is part of the traditional region of Lower Carniola and is now included in the Southeast Slovenia Statistical Region. Its territory is now part of the village of Borovec pri Kočevski Reki.
