= Lower Carniolan dialect group =

Group of dialects of Slovene

Map of regional groups of Slovene dialects Lower Carniolan (3. Kostel, 4. Kočevje, 5. Northern White Carniola, 6. Southern White Carniola)

The Lower Carniolan dialect group (dolenjska narečna skupina) is a group of closely related dialects of Slovene. The Lower Carniolan dialects are spoken in most of Lower Carniola and in the eastern half of Inner Carniola.

== Phonological and morphological characteristics ==
Among other features, this group is characterized by pitch accent, extensive diphthongization (ei, ie, uo), an a-colored semivowel, shift of o > u, and partial akanye.

== Individual dialects and subdialects ==
- Lower Carniolan dialect (dolenjsko narečje, dolenjščina)
  - Eastern Lower Carniolan subdialect (vzhodnodolenjski govor, vzhodna dolenjščina)
- North White Carniolan dialect (severnobelokranjsko narečje)
- South White Carniolan dialect (južnobelokranjsko narečje, južna belokranjščina)
- Kostel dialect (kostelsko narečje, kostelska belokranjščina, kostelščina)
