= Borovec pri Kočevski Reki =

Borovec
- Location in Slovenia
- Coordinates: 45°32′46.98″N 14°47′4″E
- Country: Slovenia
- Traditional region: Lower Carniola
- Statistical region: Southeast Slovenia
- Municipality: Kočevje

Area
  - Total: 21.25 km^{2} (8.20 sq mi)
- Elevation: 670.3 m (2,199 ft)

Population (2002)
  - Total: 57
- Postal code: 1338

Borovec pri Kočevski Reki (pronounced [bɔˈɾɔːʋəts pɾi kɔˈtʃeːu̯ski ˈɾeːki]; German: Morobitz, Gottscheerish: Mərobits) is a settlement in the Municipality of Kočevje in southern Slovenia. The area is part of the traditional region of Lower Carniola and is now included in the Southeast Slovenia Statistical Region. It also includes the former villages of Draga (Suchen), Ravne (Eben), Pleš (Plösch), and Inlauf (Inlauf) as hamlets. The former village of Ajbik (or Ajbig, German: Eibig) was annexed by Borovec pri Kočevski Reki on 30 January 1953.

== Name ==
Borovec pri Kočevski Reki was attested in written sources as Barobetz in 1498. The name of the settlement was changed from Borovec to Borovec pri Kočevski Reki (literally, 'Borovec near Kočevska Reka') in 1953. The name is derived from the Slovene common noun borovec 'pine'. In the past the German name was Morobitz.

== Geography ==
Borovec pri Kočevski Reki is a compact village extending along the road from Kočevska Reka to Dolnja Briga in the Borovec Valley (Slovene: Borovška dolina), which is separated by a low hill from the Gotenica–Kočevska Reka Valley (Slovene: Goteniškoreška dolina). Surrounding elevations include Mount Cerk (1,192 m) and Mount Mož (1,125 m) to the west, Krempa Hill (944 m) to the south, Ravne Hill (846 m) to the north, and Ajbig Hill (765 m) to the east. The soil is loamy and sandy, and water is supplied from springs north of the settlement. Prior to World War II, the area was known as Kočevska Švica (Kočevje Švica), as it developed as a small tourist resort with temperate climate and a starting point for hiking.

== History ==
In the land registry of 1498, Borovec had five full farms and two half farms. The registry of 1574 recorded 10 half-farms, one full farm, and two cottages in Borovec, three full farms divided into halves in Ravne, and a full farm in Pleš. By 1770, Borovec had grown to include 25 houses, and Pleš had grown to six houses. Before the Second World War, the village had a mixed Slovene and Gottschee German population. Borovec pri Kočevski Reki is one of the oldest villages in the Kočevje area with an original Slovene population. A steam-powered sawmill operated in the village but was burned during the war, when Ravne also came under bombardment. The Gottschee Germans were evicted in 1941, and after the war people from various parts of Slovenia settled in the village.

== Church ==
The local church, dedicated to Saint Michael, used to be a parish church, but now belongs to the Parish of Banja Loka. It was built between 1858 and 1863 and burned down by the Italian army in 1943. In 1952 the remains of the church were removed and only the foundations of the original building are preserved.
