= Zilje =

- Location in Slovenia
- Coordinates: 45°27′38.47″N 15°18′14.59″E
- Country: Slovenia
- Traditional region: White Carniola
- Statistical region: Southeast Slovenia
- Municipality: Črnomelj

Area
  - Total: 5.07 km^{2} (1.96 sq mi)
- Elevation: 234.4 m (769 ft)

Population (2020)
  - Total: 131
  - Density: 25.8/km^{2} (66.9/sq mi)
- Postal code: 8344

Zilje (pronounced [ˈziːljɛ]; German: Sile) is a settlement above the left bank of the Kolpa River in the Municipality of Črnomelj in the White Carniola area of southeastern Slovenia. The area is part of the traditional region of Lower Carniola and is now included in the Southeast Slovenia Statistical Region.

== Geography ==
Zilje has three settlement centers: Gornje Zilje (literally, 'upper Zilje') to the west with a smaller hamlet called Majišče, Srednje Zilje (literally, 'middle Zilje') east of that, also known as Cvetaše, and Spodnje Zilje (literally, 'lower Zilje') furthest east. A road from Vinica to Preloka runs through the village. The fields have sinkholes, and above them are sparse birch and fern woods, low-quality hay fields mowed once a year, and then mixed woods in the direction of Bojanci. The village lies on the sheltered lee of a hill, favorable for orchards and vineyards.

== Name ==
Zilje was recorded in written sources in 1674 as Dorff Sylle. The name is believed to derive from the same root as Slovene Zilja 'Gail Valley' (in Austria), probably from a pre-Romance substrate form such as *gai̯li̯a- meaning 'foaming, powerful' and referring to the nearby river.

== Church ==
The local church is dedicated to Saint Anthony the Great and belongs to the Parish of Preloka. It was first mentioned in written documents dating to 1526, but owes its current Baroque look to a remodelling in the 18th century. In 1888 it also underwent a major rebuilding. The main altar dates to the late 19th century.

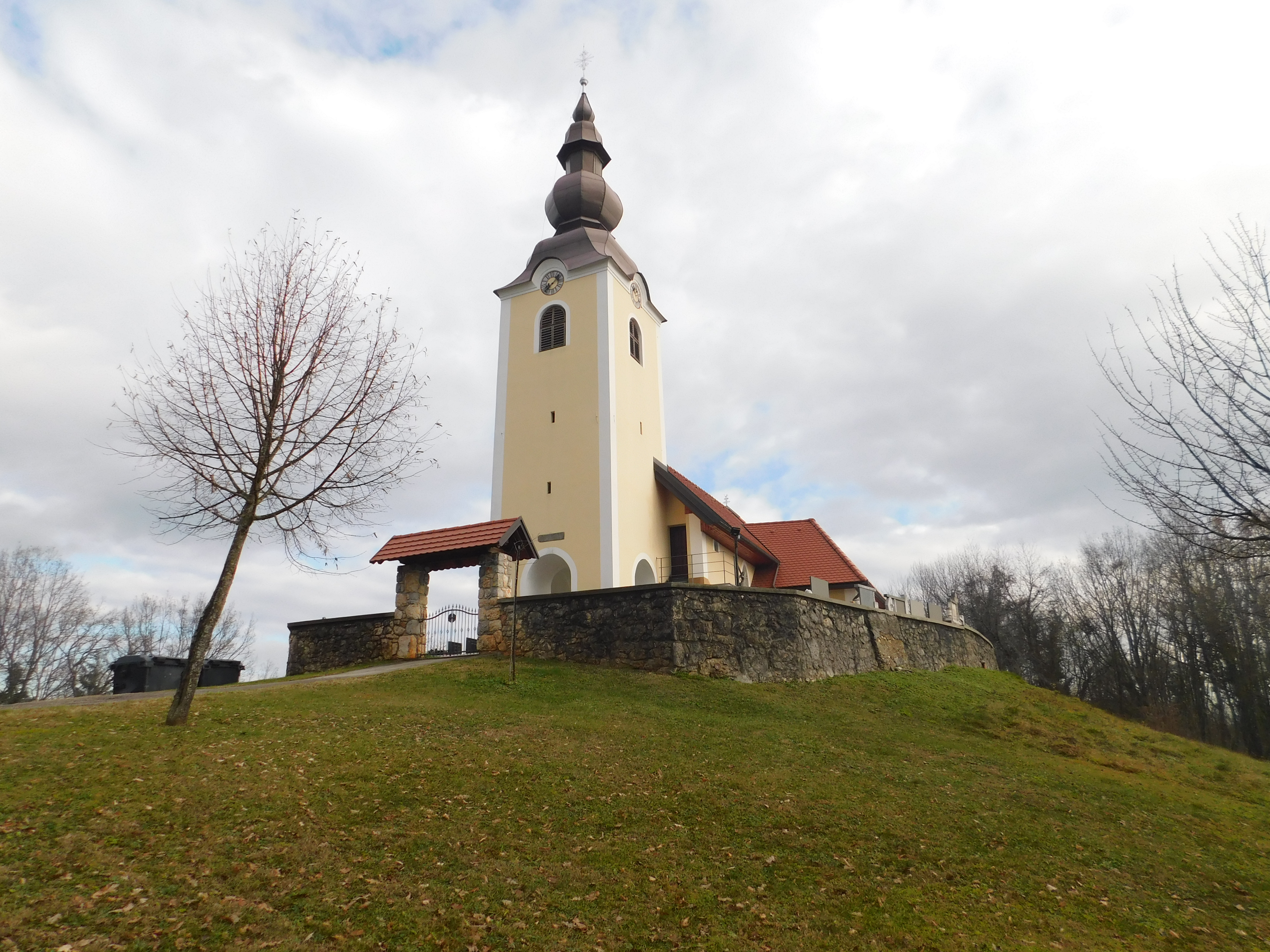
St. Anthony the Great Church in Zilje. 22 December 2022
