= Gornji Suhor pri Vinici =

- Location in Slovenia
- Coordinates: 45°29′30.82″N 15°11′15.14″E
- Country: Slovenia
- Traditional region: White Carniola
- Statistical region: Southeast Slovenia
- Municipality: Črnomelj

Area
  - Total: 4.46 km^{2} (1.72 sq mi)
- Elevation: 161 m (528 ft)

Population (2020)
  - Total: 38
  - Density: 8.5/km^{2} (22/sq mi)
- Postal code: 8343

Gornji Suhor pri Vinici (pronounced [ˈɡoːɾnji ˈsuːxɔɾ pɾi ˈʋiːnitsi]; German: Obersuchor) is a village on the route from Dragatuš to Vinica in the Municipality of Črnomelj in the White Carniola area of southeastern Slovenia. The area is part of the traditional region of Lower Carniola and is now included in the Southeast Slovenia Statistical Region.

== Name ==
The name of the settlement was changed from Gornji Suhor to Gornji Suhor pri Vinici in 1953. The German name for the village is Obersuchor.

== Church ==
The local church is dedicated to Saints Fabian and Sebastian and belongs to the Parish of Vinica. It was first mentioned in written documents dating to 1526, and still has Gothic ribbed vaulting in its sanctuary. The main altar dates to 1658 and was restored in the late 19th century.

== World War II ==
A plaque commemorates a British bomber aircraft that crashed close to Gornji Suhor on March 31, 1945. The ambassador of the United Kingdom, Tiffany Sadler, celebrated British–Slovenian Friendship Day together with Slovene Minister of Defense Marjan Šarec on May 6, 2024, in Gornji Suhor.
