= Pleš, Kočevje =

Pleš
- Location in Slovenia
- Coordinates: 45°33′14.20″N 14°47′20.19″E
- Country: Slovenia
- Traditional region: Lower Carniola
- Statistical region: Southeast Slovenia
- Municipality: Kočevje
- Elevation: 644.1 m (2,113 ft)

Population (2002)
  - Total: none

Pleš (pronounced [ˈpleːʃ]; German: Plösch) is a remote settlement in the Municipality of Kočevje in southern Slovenia. The area is part of the traditional region of Lower Carniola and is now included in the Southeast Slovenia Statistical Region. Its territory is now part of the village of Borovec pri Kočevski Reki.

== Name ==
Pleš was attested in historical sources as Plesch in 1498 and 1574. Like related names (e.g., Plešivec, Plešivica), the name Pleš is derived from the adjective pleš 'bare, barren of vegetation', referring to the local terrain.

== History ==
Pleš was listed in the land registry of 1498 as having a full farm; in the land registry of 1574, the farm had been divided into two halves. Pleš gradually grew into a settlement with six houses. In 1971, Pleš had only one house, located about 100 m west of the road to Kočevska Reka.
