= Ručetna Vas =

- Location in Slovenia
- Coordinates: 45°37′14.84″N 15°9′49.92″E
- Country: Slovenia
- Traditional region: White Carniola
- Statistical region: Southeast Slovenia
- Municipality: Črnomelj

Area
  - Total: 2.03 km^{2} (0.78 sq mi)
- Elevation: 209.3 m (687 ft)

Population (2020)
  - Total: 131
  - Density: 64.5/km^{2} (167/sq mi)
- Postal code: 8340

Ručetna Vas (pronounced [ˈɾuːtʃɛtna ˈʋaːs]; Slovene: Ručetna vas, German: Rutschetendorf) is a settlement north of Črnomelj in the White Carniola area of southeastern Slovenia. The area is part of the traditional region of Lower Carniola and is now included in the Southeast Slovenia Statistical Region.

== Geography ==
Ručetna Vas is a clustered village that lies among orchards on a terrace below the railroad from Semič to Črnomelj. Fertile fields lie to the east, and there is a spring in the center of the village that floods the area during heavy rains. The spring is the source of an influent stream that disappears into the karst landscape towards the village of Starihov Vrh. There is extensive cultivation of vineyards. The surrounding forest is mixed woods with many chestnut trees. There is a deep karst shaft above the railroad on the edge of the Kočevje Rog plateau.

== History ==
During the 18th century and first half of the 19th century, the village was part of the Dominion of Krupa. In 1756 the village had four farms that were subject to the dominion. The village was the seat of an elected overseer for vineyards and taxes (Slovene: gornik) with some judicial authority. From 1727 to 1738 this position was held by Jakob Plut from the Rotič farm; oral tradition states that this is the oldest surname in the village. In the fall of 1942, Italian troops burned two houses and ten vineyard cottages in the village. During the October offensive that year, German forces killed a prisoner on the road below the village who was returning home. From the winter of 1943 to April 1944, a business committee of the Partisan Executive Council of the Liberation Front was headquartered here. Other Partisan operations in the village included a judicial and medical station, a cartography office, a courier station, a radio transmitter, a shoemaker's shop, and a tailor's shop.
