= August Schauer =

Roman Catholic priest

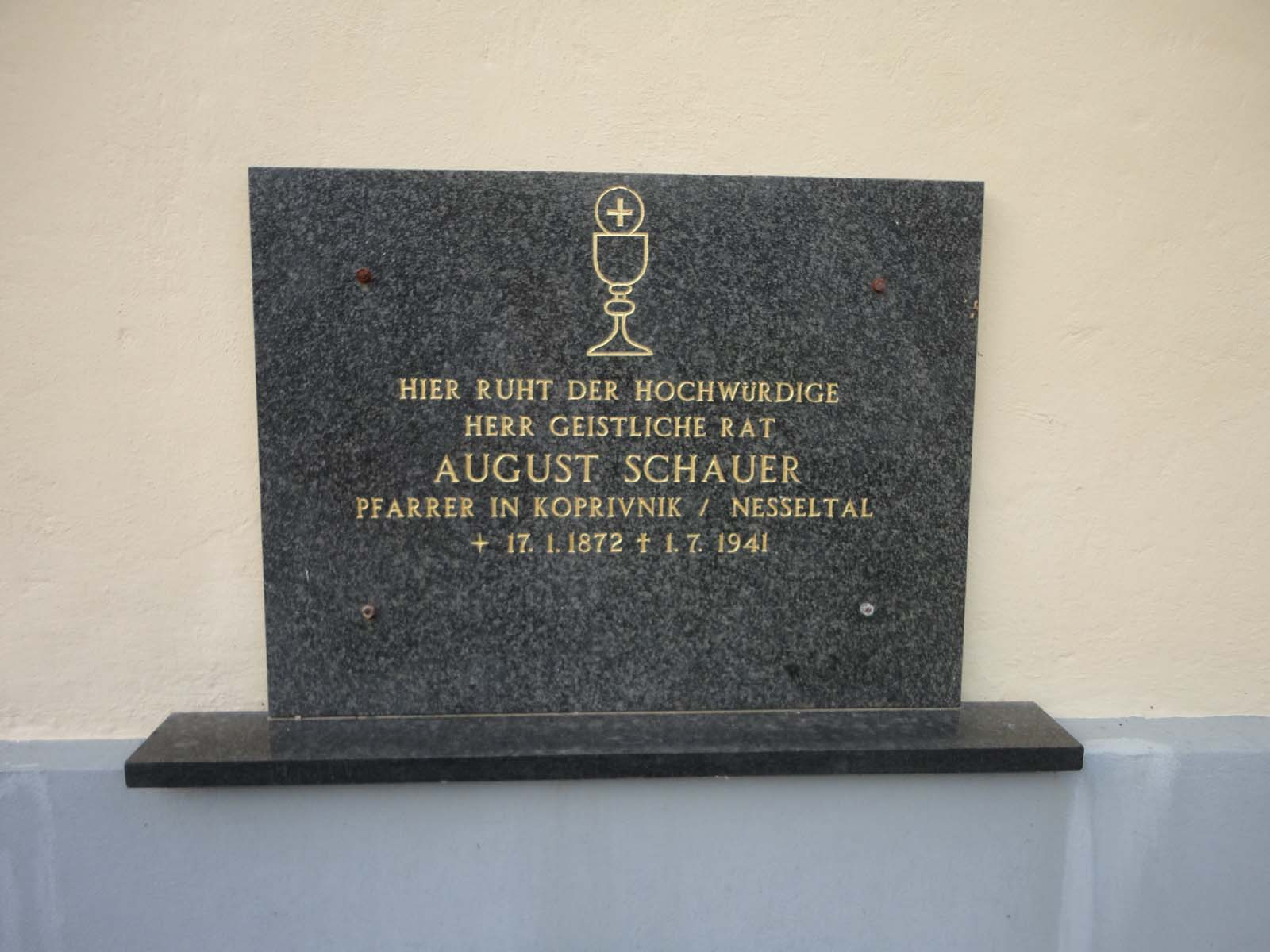
- Memorial plaque to August Schauer, Kočevske Poljane church wall

Orders
- Ordination: 1897

Personal details
- Born: August Schauer; 17 January 1872 Pöllandl, Austria-Hungary
- Died: 1 July 1941 (aged 69) Lubiana, Kingdom of Italy
- Buried: Kočevske Poljane, Slovenia
- Denomination: Roman Catholic

August Schauer (17 January 1872 – 1 July 1941) was a Gottschee Roman Catholic priest and publisher.

== Education ==
After graduating from the lower secondary school in Kočevje, Schauer attended the upper secondary school in Novo Mesto. He then studied theology in Ljubljana and was ordained a priest on 22 July 1897.

== Priesthood ==
Schauer celebrated his first mass in Kočevske Poljane on 8 August 1897. He was initially appointed as a curate in Koprivnik, and then transferred to Stari Log in 1899. Schauer then became the parish priest in Topla Reber in 1901. He became the parish priest of Koprivnik in 1906. Schauer served as the parish priest of Koprivnik for over 30 years. He was appointed a spiritual adviser in 1930. A celebration was held in Koprivnik on 10 January 1936 to mark his 30 years of service as parish priest. A celebration marking 40 years of his priesthood was held on 22 July 1937.

== Professional work ==
Schauer edited the Gottscheer Kalender (Gottschee Almanac) (sl) from 1925 to 1941, following the editorships of Wilhelm Tschinkel (1921–1923) and Robert Braune (1924). In addition to promoting Catholicism, the almanac also cultivated local history studies and the Gottscheerisch dialect. Schauer was among the organizers of the celebration in August 1930 to commemorate 600 years of Gottschee German settlement, and he delivered a sermon at the event. Like most of his fellow Gottschee German clergy, Schauer was opposed to the mass resettlement of the Gottschee Germans during the Second World War.

== Death ==
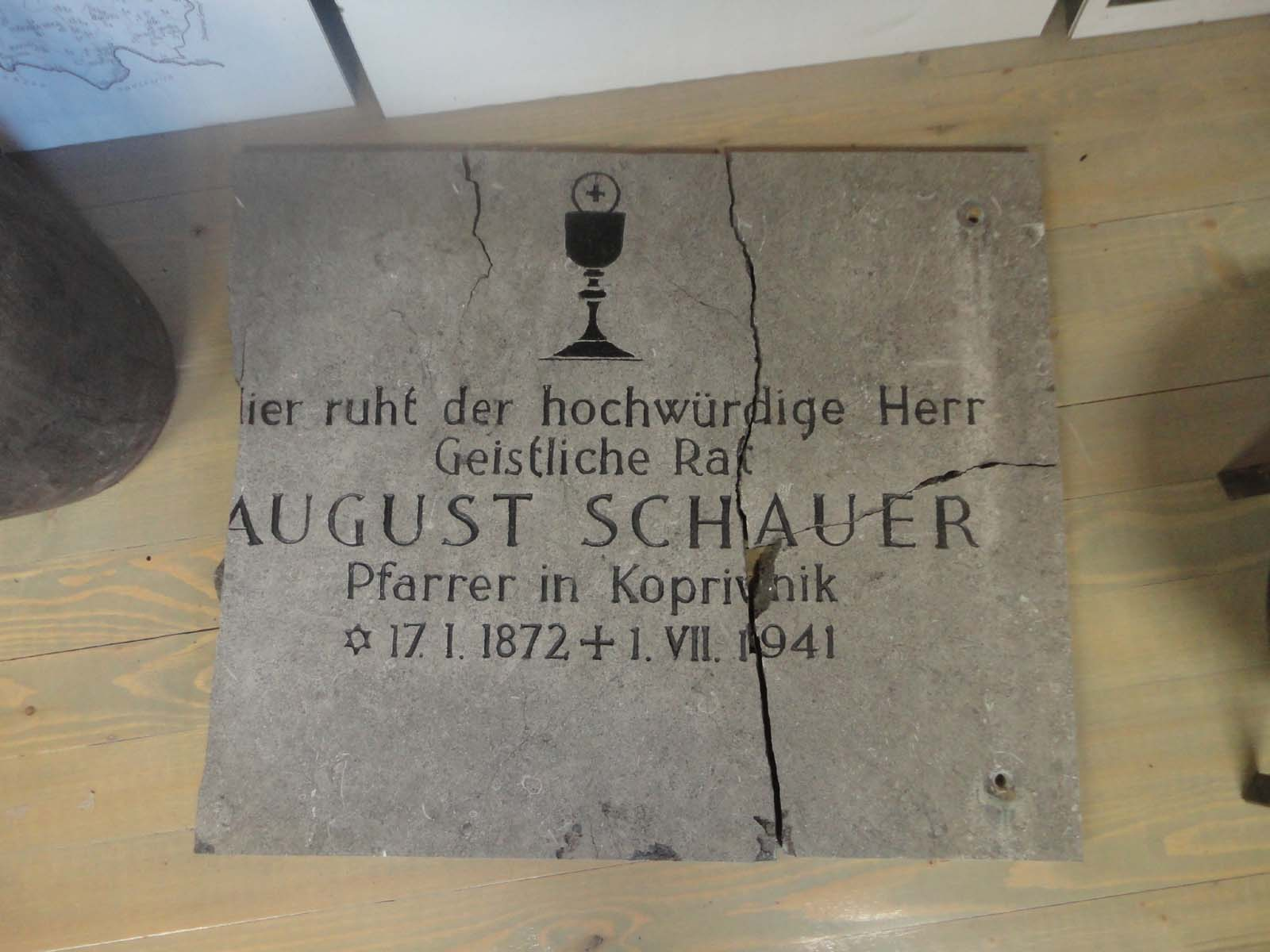
Plaque to August Schauer, formerly on the Kočevske Poljane church wall

Schauer died at the Leonišče Hospital in Ljubljana on 1 July 1941 and was buried in his native village of Kočevske Poljane.
