= Tanča Gora =

- Location in Slovenia
- Coordinates: 45°32′5.84″N 15°9′18.58″E
- Country: Slovenia
- Traditional region: White Carniola
- Statistical region: Southeast Slovenia
- Municipality: Črnomelj

Area
  - Total: 11.19 km^{2} (4.32 sq mi)
- Elevation: 221.5 m (727 ft)

Population (2020)
  - Total: 223
  - Density: 19.9/km^{2} (51.6/sq mi)
- Postal code: 8343

Tanča Gora (pronounced [ˈtaːntʃa ˈɡɔːɾa]; German: Tanzberg) is a settlement in the hills southwest of Črnomelj in the White Carniola area of southeastern Slovenia. The area is part of the traditional region of Lower Carniola and is now included in the Southeast Slovenia Statistical Region.

There are two churches in the settlement. Both belong to the Parish of Dragatuš. One is dedicated to Saint Thomas and was first mentioned in written documents dating to 1526 and preserves its Gothic sanctuary. The second is dedicated to Saint Anne and was built in 1805 on the site of an earlier church.
