= Koblarji =

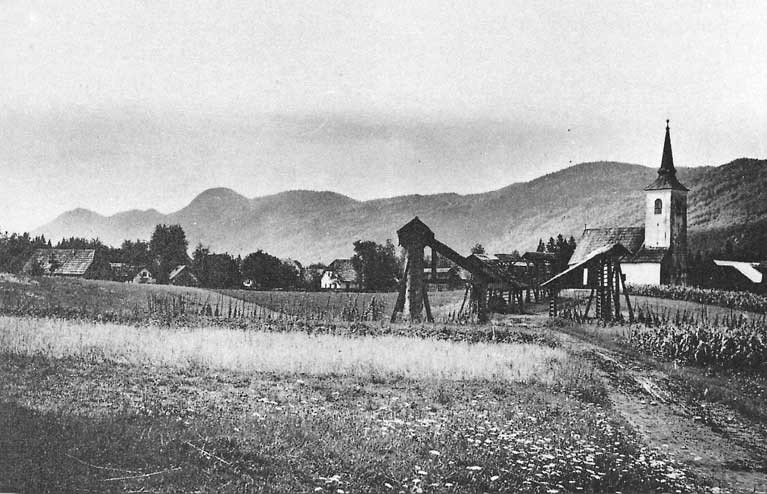
- Koblarji in 1932.

- Location in Slovenia
- Coordinates: 45°40′46.69″N 14°49′54.09″E
- Country: Slovenia
- Traditional region: Lower Carniola
- Statistical region: Southeast Slovenia
- Municipality: Kočevje

Area
  - Total: 11.63 km^{2} (4.49 sq mi)
- Elevation: 469.2 m (1,539 ft)

Population (2021)
  - Total: 285
- Postal code: 1332

Koblarji (pronounced [ˈkoːblaɾji]; in older sources also Kovlerji, German: Koflern, Gottscheerish: Kowlarn, in de Kowlara) is a settlement northwest of Kočevje in southern Slovenia. The area is part of the traditional region of Lower Carniola and is now included in the Southeast Slovenia Statistical Region. Koblarji Cave (Slovene: Koblarska jama, Dolga jama, Velika jama pri Koblarjih, German: Weites Loch bei Koflern, Kofler Grotte) is located in the settlement.

== Name ==
Koblarji was first attested in written sources under its German name, as Koflern or Koflein. The Slovene name is derived from the German name. The German name is derived from Middle High German kofeler 'hill dweller', from Middle High German kofel 'wooded hill'. An alternative but less likely theory derives the name from Middle High German kobeler 'hut dweller'.

== History ==
Koblarji was a Gottschee German village. In the land registry of 1574 the settlement had eight full farms divided into 16 half-farms with 16 owners, corresponding to a population between 58 and 65. In the 1770 census the village had 39 houses. The population of Koblarji steadily declined from 1869, with 255 people in 44 houses, to only 196 people in 1931, largely due to emigration. At the time, the village economy was based on raising crops and animals, forestry, and peddling. There were two inns in the village, run by the Perz and Erker families or, according to some sources, Vode and Barthol. The ethnic German residents, numbering 150, were evicted during the Second World War. Unlike many Gottschee settlements, the village was not burned during the war. After the war, 41 of the village's houses were habitable and the settlement had a population of 114. By 2011, the population had grown to 292.

== Church ==
The local church, dedicated to Saint Stephen and Saint Anthony of Padua, was a 16th-century building that survived the Second World War more or less intact, but was demolished in 1956. The church likely originally had a bell-gable. A sacristy was probably added to the southern side of the church in 1788, and a large bell tower was added in 1817. Two bells cast in 1835 and 1848 hung in the bell tower but were removed during the First World War. They were replaced by iron bells cast in 1921, but these were removed during the Second World War. A small chapel dedicated to Saint Stephen was built at the site of the former church in 2004.

== Notable people ==
Notable people that were born or lived in Koblarji include:

- Lojze Čampa (1935–2000), forestry expert and ecologist
- Josefine Samide (1870–1968), educator and school director in Klagenfurt
