= Jelševnik =

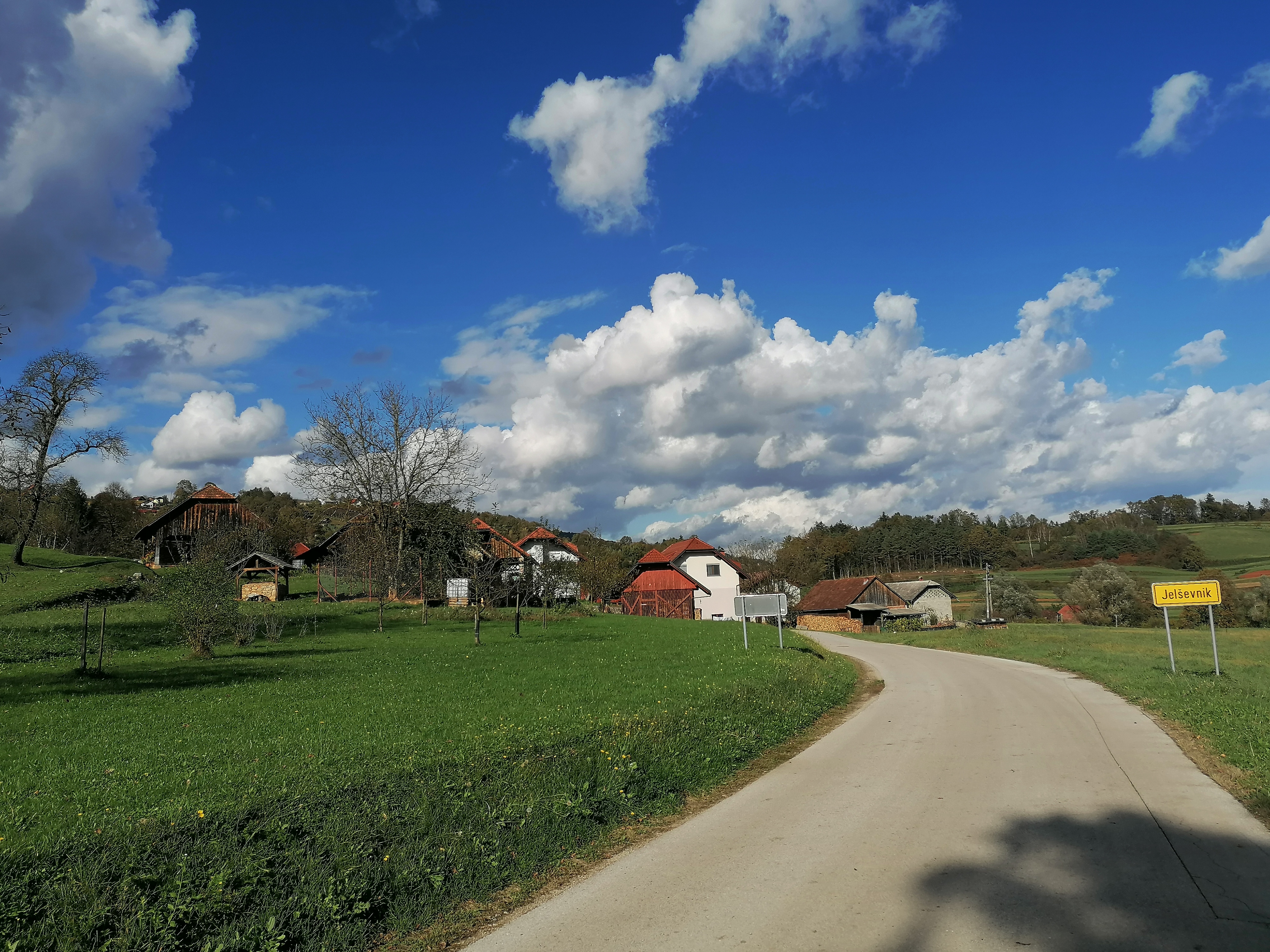

- Location in Slovenia
- Coordinates: 45°34′16.11″N 15°8′48.51″E
- Country: Slovenia
- Traditional region: White Carniola
- Statistical region: Southeast Slovenia
- Municipality: Črnomelj

Area
  - Total: 1.78 km^{2} (0.69 sq mi)
- Elevation: 166.8 m (547 ft)

Population (2020)
  - Total: 124
  - Density: 69.7/km^{2} (180/sq mi)
- Postal code: 8340

Jelševnik (pronounced [jɛu̯ˈʃeːu̯nik]) is a settlement west of the town of Črnomelj in the White Carniola area of southeastern Slovenia. The area is part of the traditional region of Lower Carniola and is now included in the Southeast Slovenia Statistical Region.

Near the settlement, at the source of Dobličica Creek, a tributary of the Lahinja, the unique amphibian black proteus was found in 1986.
