= Eastern Lower Carniolan subdialect =

Dialect of Slovene

The Eastern Lower Carniolan subdialect (vzhodnodolenjski govor, vzhodna dolenjščina, vzhodnodolenjsko podnarečje) is a Slovene subdialect in the Lower Carniolan dialect group. It is spoken south of the Lower Sava Valley dialect in the watersheds of the Mirna and Temenica rivers, east of a line running from west of Trebnje and west of Novo Mesto to the lower Krka Valley. The dialect includes the settlements of Kostanjevica na Krki, Krmelj, Mirna, Mokronog, Novo Mesto, Raka, Šentjernej, Šentrupert, Škocjan and Trebnje.

== Phonological and morphological characteristics ==
The Eastern Lower Carniolan subdialect has a pitch accent.
