= Preloka =

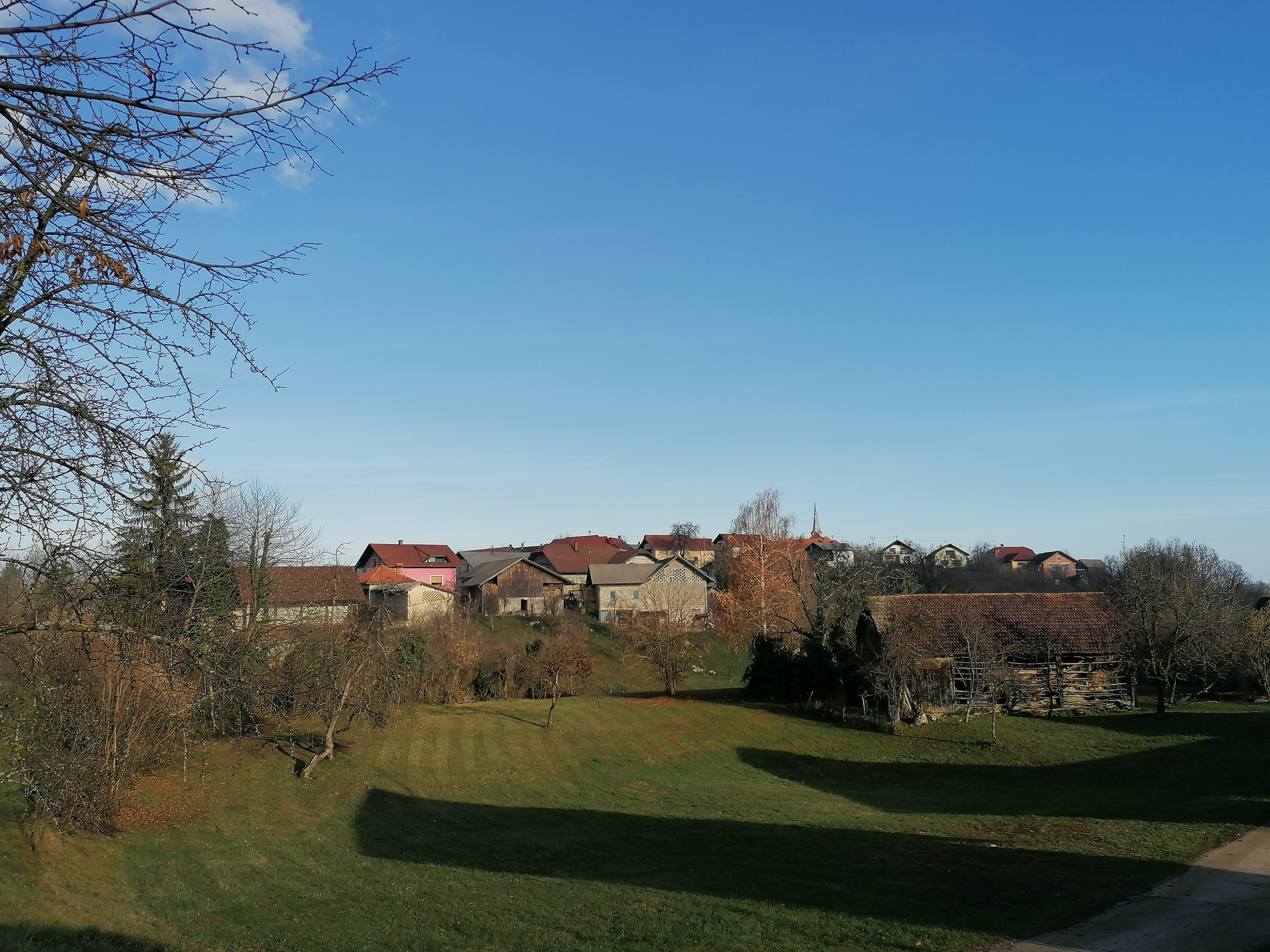

- Location in Slovenia
- Coordinates: 45°28′14.7″N 15°20′28.77″E
- Country: Slovenia
- Traditional region: White Carniola
- Statistical region: Southeast Slovenia
- Municipality: Črnomelj

Area
  - Total: 8.31 km^{2} (3.21 sq mi)
- Elevation: 284.7 m (934 ft)

Population (2020)
  - Total: 106
  - Density: 12.8/km^{2} (33.0/sq mi)
- Postal code: 8344
- Climate: Cfb

Preloka (pronounced [ˈpɾeːlɔka]) is a settlement above the left bank of the Kolpa River in the Municipality of Črnomelj in the White Carniola area of southeastern Slovenia. In addition to the village of Preloka, it includes the settlements of Jakovini, Novoseli, Škavurini, and Vidine. The area is part of the traditional region of Lower Carniola and is now included in the Southeast Slovenia Statistical Region.

== Church ==
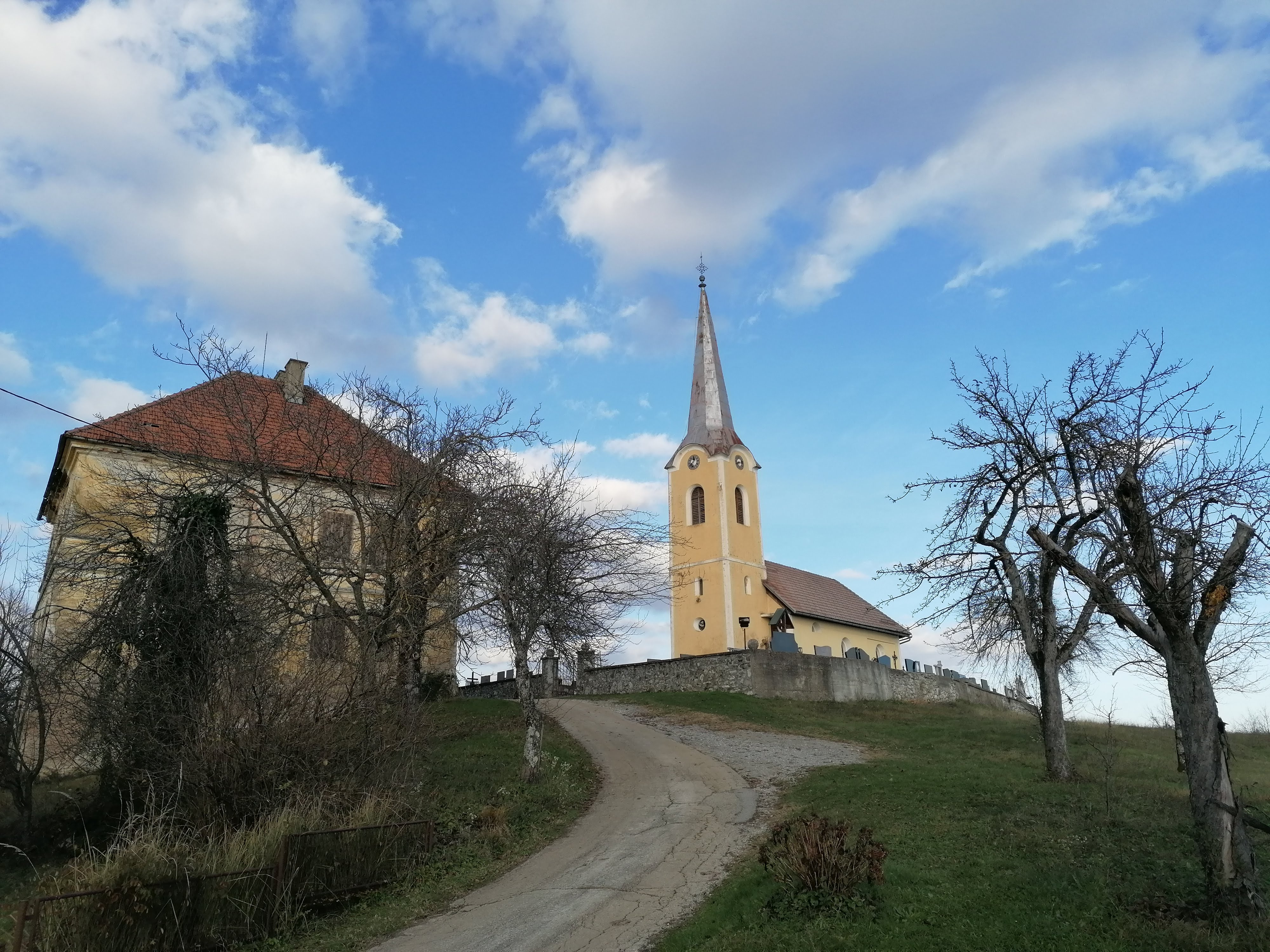
Holy Trinity Church in Preloka

The local parish church, built on the top of Krtinjek Hill to the east of the village core, is dedicated to the Holy Trinity (Slovene: Sveta Trojica) and belongs to the Roman Catholic Diocese of Novo Mesto. It was mentioned for the first time in 1334 as a chapel of ease of Holy Cross Church in the nearby village of Vinica. The original church was probably destroyed during Ottoman incursions into White Carniola in the 15th and 16th centuries. The current building was built in the mid-19th century on what is said to have been the site of an Orthodox church dedicated to Saint Kyriaki.
