= Koprivnik, Kočevje =

Koprivnik
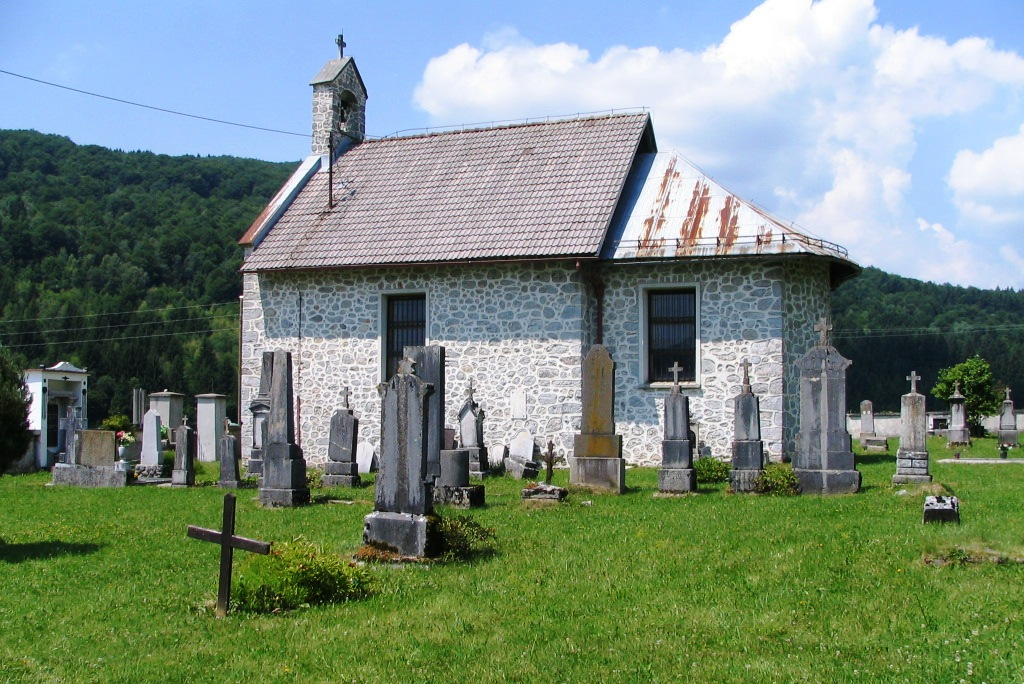
- Chapel and cemetery in Koprivnik

- Location in Slovenia
- Coordinates: 45°36′9.5″N 15°1′52.08″E
- Country: Slovenia
- Traditional region: Lower Carniola
- Statistical region: Southeast Slovenia
- Municipality: Kočevje

Area
  - Total: 12.03 km^{2} (4.64 sq mi)
- Elevation: 629.6 m (2,066 ft)

Population (2002)
  - Total: 65
- Postal code: 1330

Koprivnik (pronounced [kɔˈpɾíːwnik]; German: Nesseltal or Nesselthal) is a settlement in the Municipality of Kočevje in southern Slovenia. It was a village settled by Gottschee Germans until 1941. During the Second World War its original population was expelled. The area is part of the traditional region of Lower Carniola and is now part of the Southeast Slovenia Statistical Region.

== History ==
The Koprivnik volunteer fire department became a founding unit of the Kočevje municipal fire department on 28 August 1955.

== Church ==
The local parish church in the village was dedicated to Saint James and was built in 1622 on the location of a 14th-century church. It was set on fire in 1949 and its ruins totally removed in 1955. A 19th-century chapel built outside the village next to the main cemetery was a dedicated to Saint Anne and was burnt to the ground in 1956. A church was built in its place in 1973. The cemetery is one of only ten in the Kočevje region to have (mostly) preserved the gravestones of the Gottschee Germans. Some of the gravestones have been professionally restored.

== Notable people ==
Notable people that were born or lived in Koprivnik include the following:

- August Schauer (1872–1941), parish priest at Koprivnik for over 30 years and editor of the Gottscheer Kalender (Gottschee Almanac) from 1925 to 1941
