= Komarna Vas =

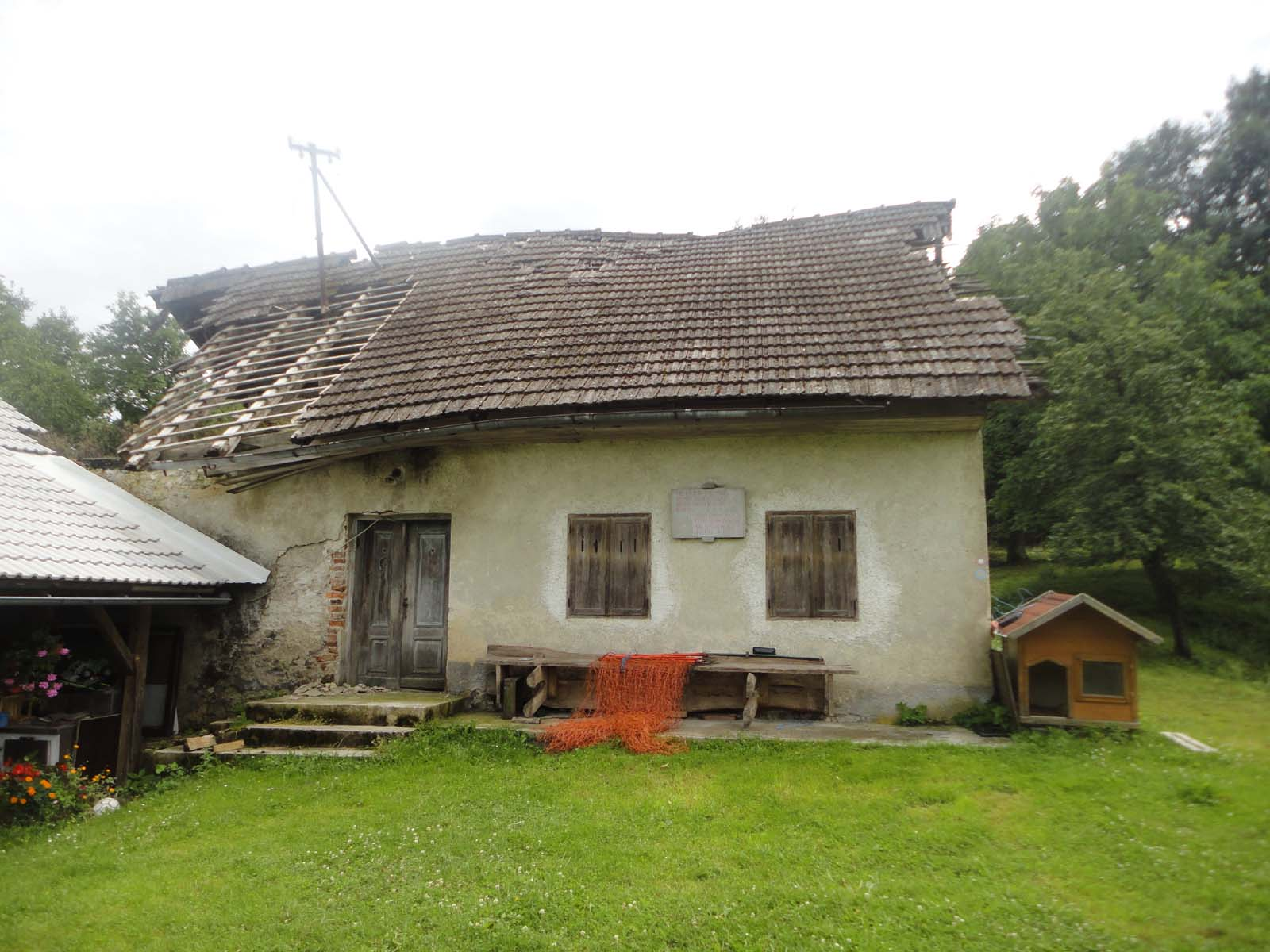
- A house in Komarna Vas, the only building left in the destroyed village. During World War II, it served as the headquarters of the central Partisan hospital.

- Location in Slovenia
- Coordinates: 45°40′22.08″N 15°4′49.2″E
- Country: Slovenia
- Traditional region: Lower Carniola
- Statistical region: Southeast Slovenia
- Municipality: Semič

Area
  - Total: 15.39 km^{2} (5.94 sq mi)
- Elevation: 680.2 m (2,232 ft)

Komarna Vas (pronounced [kɔˈmaːɾna ˈʋaːs]; German: Muckendorf or Obertappelwerch) is a village on the eastern edge of Kočevski Rog in the Municipality of Semič in Slovenia. The area is part of the historical region of Lower Carniola. The municipality is now included in the Southeast Slovenia Statistical Region.

== History ==
Komarna Vas was inhabited by Gottschee Germans that were mostly expelled in 1941 during the Second World War. The local church was burned down in 1942. It was dedicated to the Virgin Mary, Queen of All Saints.
