= Griblje =

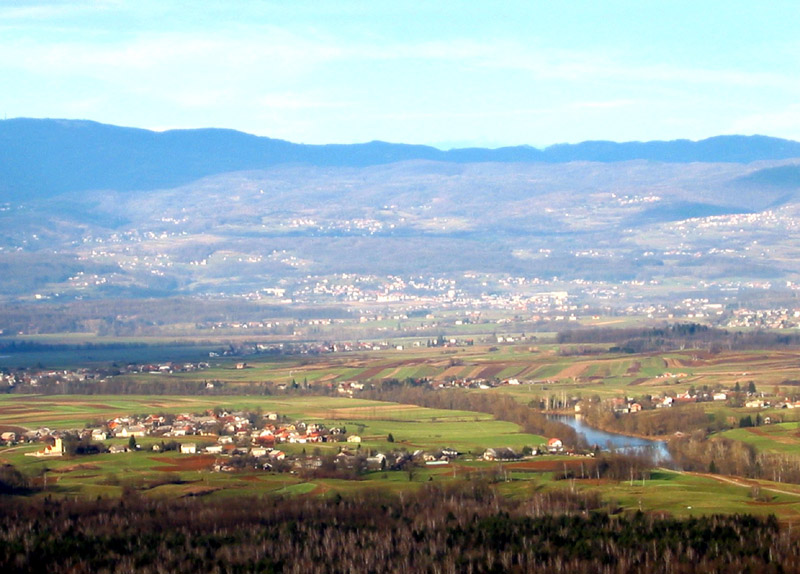

- Location in Slovenia
- Coordinates: 45°34′31.61″N 15°17′33.94″E
- Country: Slovenia
- Traditional region: White Carniola
- Statistical region: Southeast Slovenia
- Municipality: Črnomelj

Area
  - Total: 3.4 km^{2} (1.3 sq mi)
- Elevation: 153.4 m (503 ft)

Population (2020)
  - Total: 334
  - Density: 98/km^{2} (250/sq mi)
- Postal code: 8332

Griblje (pronounced [ˈɡɾiːbljɛ]; German: Grüble) is a settlement on the left bank of the Kolpa River in the Municipality of Črnomelj in the White Carniola area of southeastern Slovenia. The area is part of the traditional region of White Carniola and is now included in the Southeast Slovenia Statistical Region.

== Name ==
Griblje was attested in historical sources as Griblach in 1468, Briglach in 1490, and Griblah in 1593. The origin of the name is uncertain. It may derive from the dialect common noun grib 'Boletus', referring to a place where such mushrooms grow. Other possibilities are derivation from griba 'clod, clump (of soil)', from a word related to Serbo-Croatian griblja 'furrow', or from griva 'slope overgrown with grass'.

== Church ==
The local church, south of the main settlement, is dedicated to Saint Vitus (Slovene: sveti Vid) and belongs to the Parish of Podzemelj. It was first mentioned in written documents dating to 1526, but the current building dates to the 18th century.
