= Dragatuš =

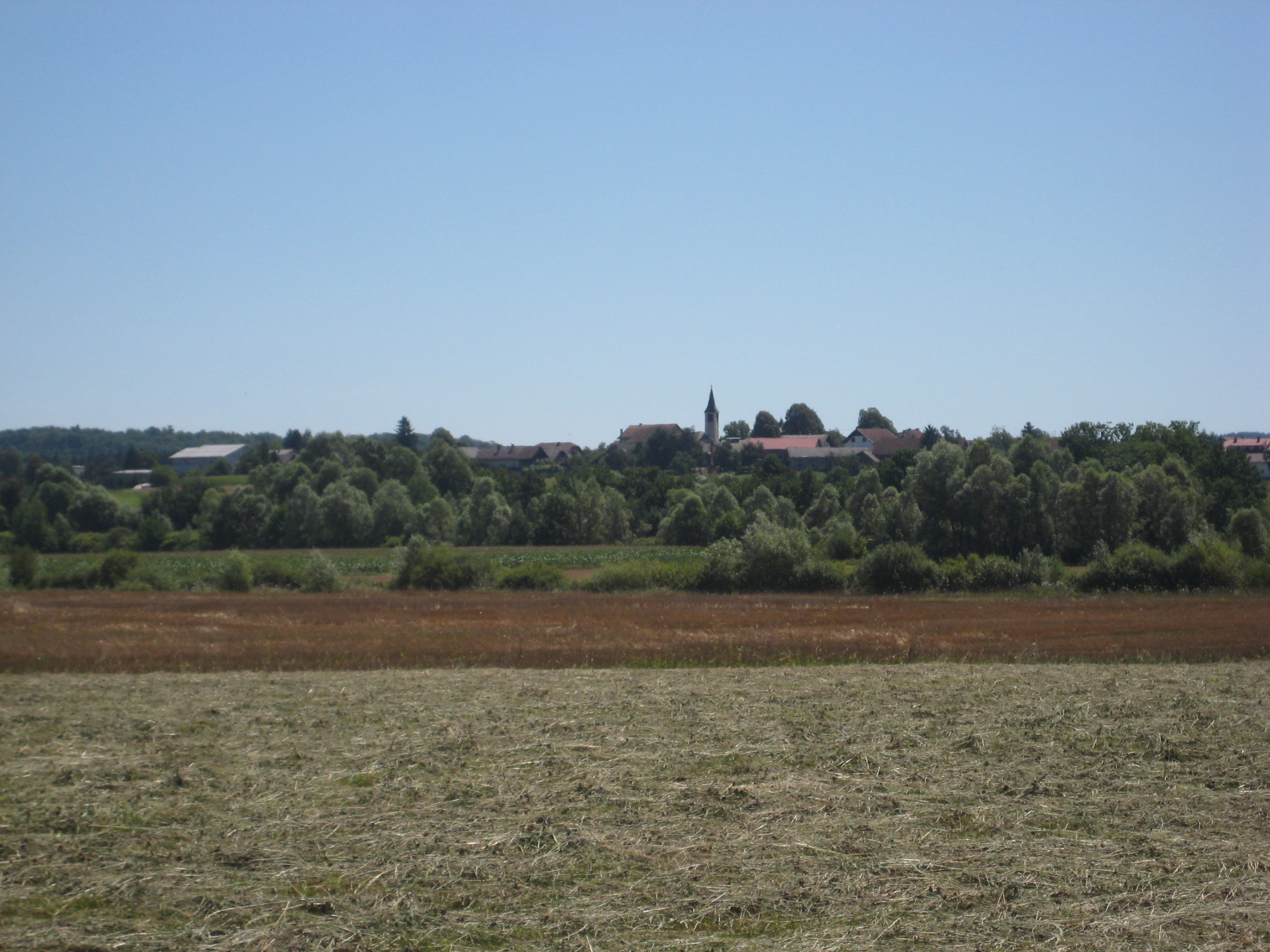

- Location in Slovenia
- Coordinates: 45°31′17.12″N 15°10′44.16″E
- Country: Slovenia
- Traditional region: White Carniola
- Statistical region: Southeast Slovenia
- Municipality: Črnomelj

Area
  - Total: 1.53 km^{2} (0.59 sq mi)
- Elevation: 166.7 m (547 ft)

Population (2020)
  - Total: 224
  - Density: 146/km^{2} (379/sq mi)
- Postal code: 8343

Dragatuš (pronounced [dɾaɡaˈtuːʃ], German: Dragatusch) is a village south of Črnomelj in the White Carniola area of southeastern Slovenia. The area is part of the traditional region of Lower Carniola and is now included in the Southeast Slovenia Statistical Region.

== Name ==
Dragatuš was attested in historical sources in 1352 as Dragotusch (and as Dragatusch in 1402, Draganntutsch in 1490, and Dragotws in 1593). The name is derived from the Slavic personal name *Dragotušъ or *Dragotuxъ, presumably referring to an early resident of the place. In the past the village was known as Dragatusch in German.

== Church ==
The local parish church is dedicated to John the Baptist (Slovene: sveti Janez Krstnik) and belongs to the Roman Catholic Diocese of Novo Mesto. It was built in 1858, but was destroyed during the Second World War, when the village was bombed in a German air raid on May 5, 1944.
