= Kočevski Rog =

Mountain plateau in Slovenia

Kočevski Rog or Kočevje Rog (German: Hornwald) or simply called Rog is a karstified plateau in the Kočevje Highlands above the Črmošnjice Valley in southeastern Slovenia. The plateau is part of the traditional Lower Carniola region of Slovenia and of the Dinaric Alps. The highest area is the central part, with the 1099-metre-high peak of Veliki Rog. The plateau is densely forested. The only ski slope in Lower Carniola, Rog-Črmošnjice (or Gače) also lies in the vicinity of Rog.

== The Gottscheers ==
This area, known in German as Gottschee, was settled in the late 14th century by the Carinthian Counts of Ortenburg initially with colonists from the Ortenburg estates in Carinthia and Tyrol, and by other settlers who came from Austrian and German Dioceses of Salzburg, Brixen and Freising. The settlers cleared the vacant and heavily forested land, and established towns and rural villages. The area of Carniola that was to become Gottschee had been a strategic part of the Holy Roman Empire since the year 800. As a result, there were a number of important fortifications in and around Gottschee, which received its municipal charter and city seal in 1471. The Gottschee ethnic and linguistic area consisted of more than 180 villages organized into 31 townships and parishes.

Gottscheer began to emigrate from their homeland around 1870, with most going to the United States. With the end of the Habsburg monarchy in 1918, Gottschee became a part of the new Kingdom of Yugoslavia. Thus, the Gottscheer went from being part of the ruling ethnicity of Austria-Hungary (and the ruling group in the estates of the province of Carniola itself) to an ethnic minority in a large Slavic state.

== The Gottscheer 1935–1945 ==
While some Gottscheer community leaders had embraced Nazism and agitated for "assistance" and "repatriation" to the Reich before the Wehrmacht invasion in 1941, most Gottscheer had no interest in reuniting with Greater Germany or joining the Nazis.

They had been integrated into society with their Slovenian neighbors, often intermarrying among Slovenians and becoming bilingual while maintaining their Germanic language and customs since their arrival in the region in the late 14th century. However, propaganda and Nazi ideology prevailed, and following an agreement between Benito Mussolini and Adolf Hitler, the VoMi began planning the Gottschee "resettlement" (forced expulsion) from the Italian occupation zone to the Rann Triangle (German: Ranner Dreieck), a region in Lower Styria between the confluences of the Krka, Sotla, and Sava rivers.

To achieve that goal, accommodation had to be made for the Gottschee "settlers" and some 46,000 Slovenians in the Rann Triangle region were forcibly deported to eastern Germany for potential Germanisation or forced labor beginning in November 1941. Shortly before that time, a largely transparent propaganda effort was aimed toward both the Gottscheer and the Slovenians, promising the latter equivalent farmland in Germany for the land relinquished in Lower Styria. The Gottscheer were given Reich passports and transportation to the Rann area just after the forced departure of the Slovenians. Most of the Gottschee fled due to coercion and threats since the VoMi had a deadline of 31 December 1941 for the mass movement of both groups. Though many Gottscheer did receive farmland and households, these were of lesser quality than their own, and many were in disarray from the hasty forced expulsion of the Slovenians.

From the time of their arrival to the end of the war, Gottschee farmers were harassed and sometimes killed by Tito's Partisans. The attempt to resettle the Gottscheer was a costly failure for the Nazi regime, since extra manpower was required to protect the farmers from the partisans. In 1945 the Gottscheer mostly fled to Austria and Germany.

Most Gottschee were as much victims as the Slovenians deported to the Reich, though the former were not used for forced labor as the latter were. The deported Slovenians were taken to several camps in Saxony, Silesia, and elsewhere in Germany where they were forced to work on German farms or in factories run by German industries from 1941 to 1945. The forced laborers were not always kept in formal concentration camps, but often just vacant buildings where they slept until the next day's labor took them outside these quarters. Toward the close of the war, these camps were liberated by American and Soviet troops, and the later repatriated Slovenian refugees returned to Yugoslavia to find their homes in shambles. Since then, the Rog area has been largely uninhabited.

== World War II ==
Yugoslavia was invaded by the Wehrmacht on 6 April 1941, and groups of Partisans began to gather in Kočevski Rog as early as August 1941. From May 1942 on, large areas of liberated territory were established in the Lower Carniola, the Inner Carniola and the White Carniola, with Kočevski Rog as the centre of resistance to the occupation and home to the leadership of the Liberation Front of the Slovenian People.

Following an Italian offensive in the summer of 1942, the leaders fled to forested hills above Polhov Gradec, where they decided that Rog would be the location of Partisan hospitals, workshops, schools, printing houses and stores. The leadership returned to Rog on 17 April 1943, setting up a major facility with associated barracks called Baza 20 (Base 20), which is still preserved and today is a tourist attraction. It became the headquarters of the Liberation Front of the Slovenian People, the headquarters of the High Command of Slovene Partisan troops and of the Central Committee of the Communist Party of Slovenia (CK KPS).

== World War II aftermath ==
Kočevski Rog was also a location where thousands of people, such as the Slovene Home Guard (Slovene: Slovenski domobranci) and their families, were executed by special units of the Yugoslav Army in late May 1945. They were thrown into various pits and caves, which were then sealed with explosives. Several thousand (between 10,000 and 12,000, according to certain sources)

- The killing continued after the war, as Tito's victorious forces took revenge on their real and perceived enemies. British forces in Austria turned back tens of thousands of fleeing Yugoslavs. Estimates range from 30,000 to 55,000 killed between spring and autumn 1945. War prisoners, repatriated by the British military authorities from Austria, where they had fled, died in these postwar summary executions.

Nikolai Tolstoy mentions the events in his book The Minister and the Massacres and John Corsellis, who served in Austria with the British Army, wrote about the events in his book, Slovenia 1945: Memories of Death and Survival after World War II.

Boris Karapandžić writes that there were 12,000 members of the Slovene Home Guard, 3,000 Serbian Chetniks, 1,000 Montenegrin Chetniks and 2,500 members of the Croatian Home Guard. Karapandžić's report is confirmed in subsequent book by a group of scholars.
