= Gottscheerish =

Upper German dialect of Slovenia

- Gottscheerisch, Kočevarščina
- Native to: Slovenia
- Region: Gottschee
- Language family: Indo-European: Germanic; West Germanic; Elbe Germanic; High German; Upper German; Bavarian; Southern Bavarian; Gottscheerish

Language codes
- ISO 639-3: –
- Glottolog: gott1234
- IETF: bar-SI
- Gottscheerisch is classified as Critically Endangered by the UNESCO Atlas of the World's Languages in Danger.

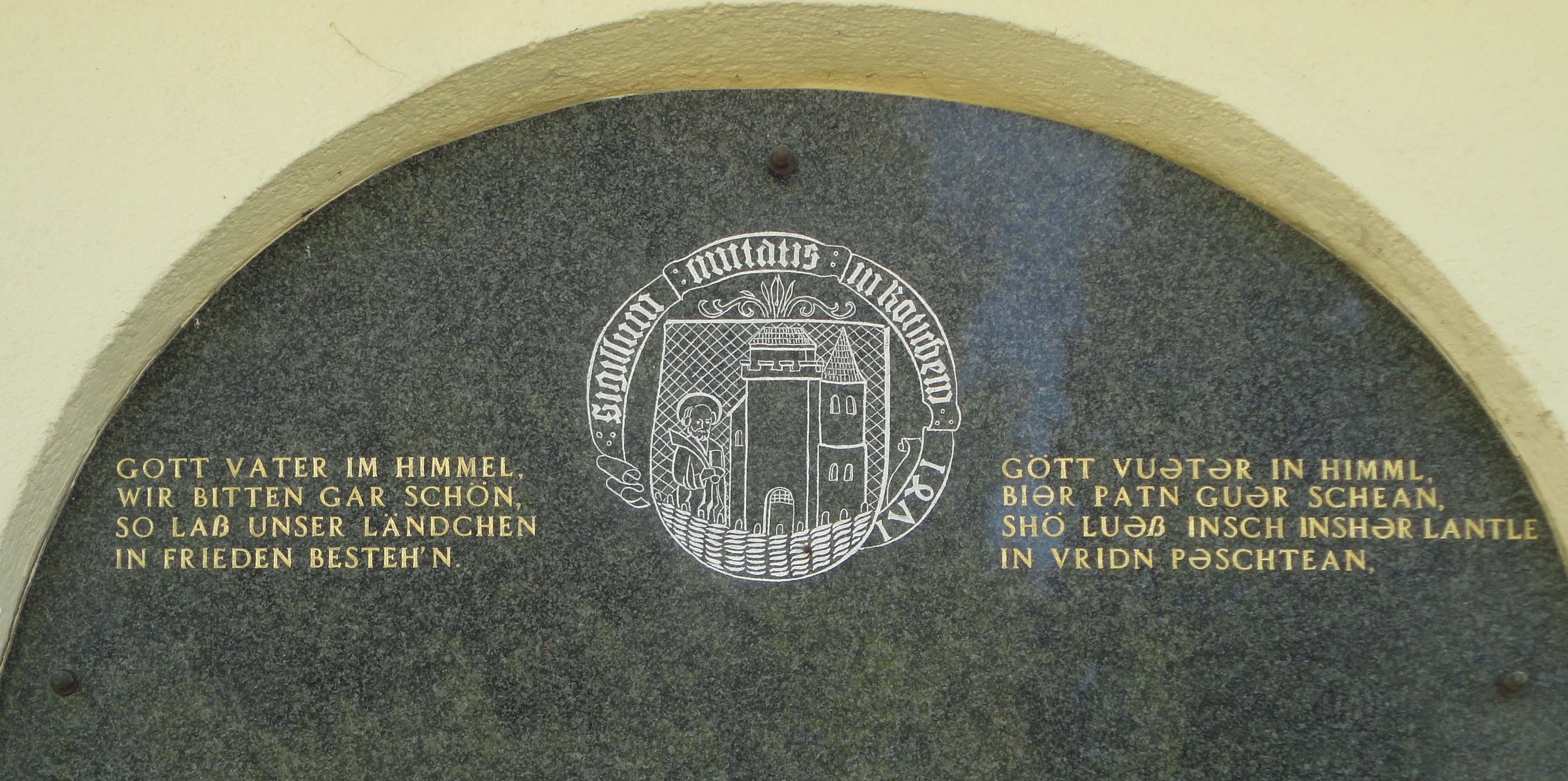
Inscription in Gottscheerish on a plaque at the wall of the Chapel of the Holy Sepulchre near the Church of Corpus Christi in Trata, Kočevje

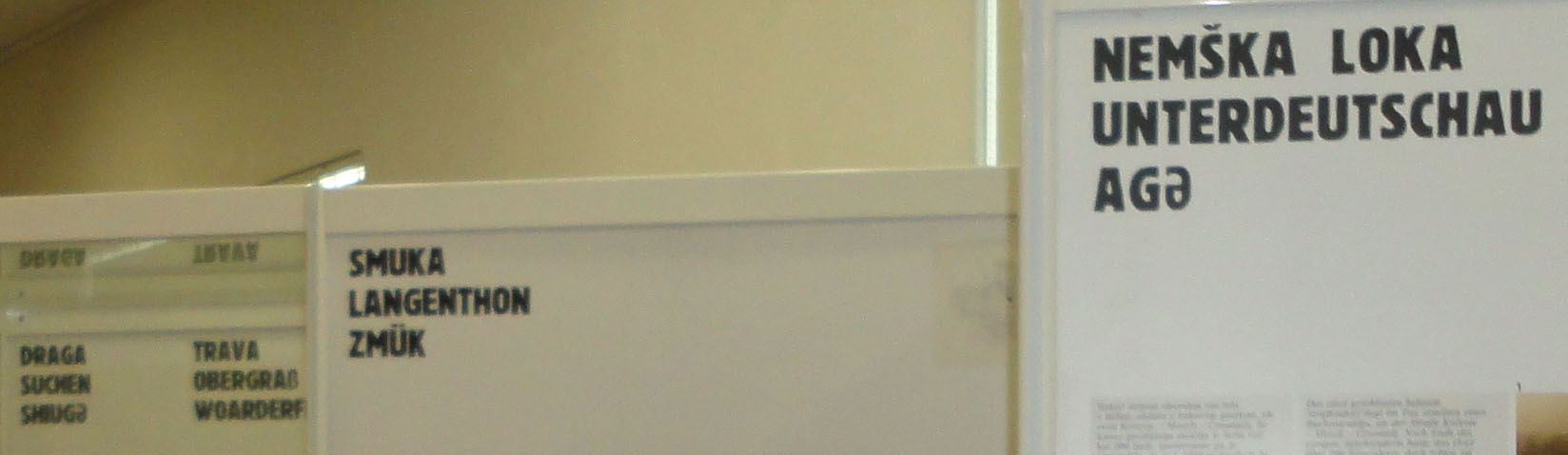
The traditional Gottscherish placenames are not always the same as the German names

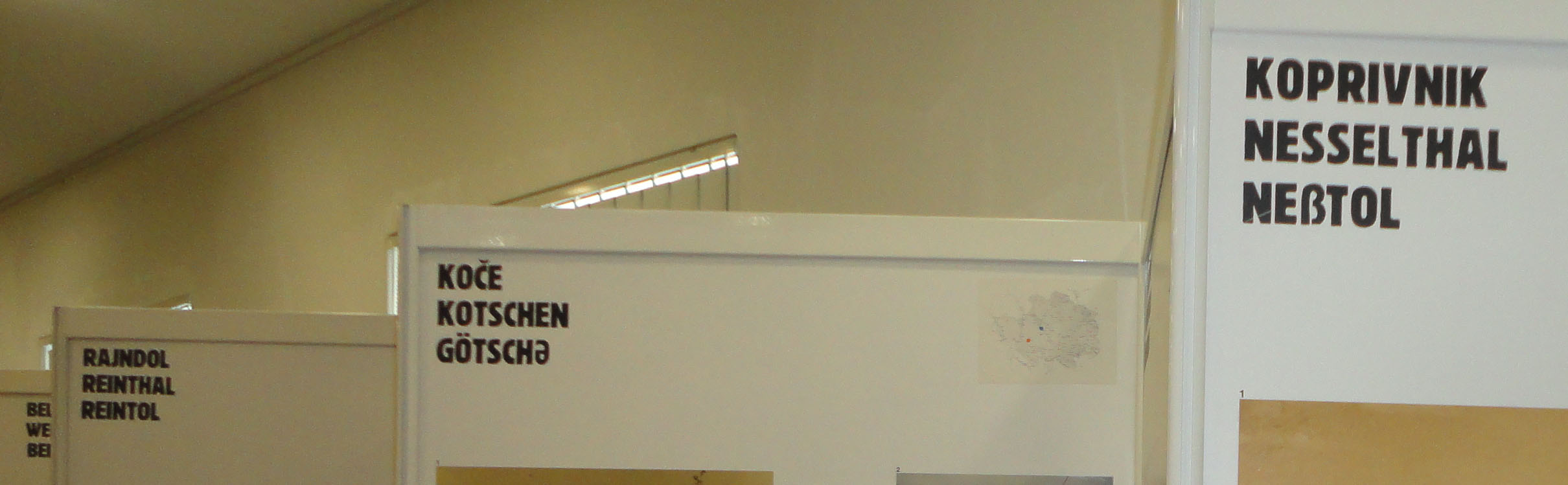
The Gottscherish placenames show that the stage of the sound system of Gottscheerish is different from Standard German

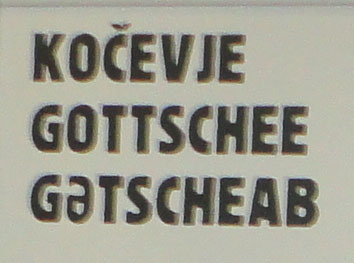
Name of the City of Kočevje in Slovene, German and Gottscheerish

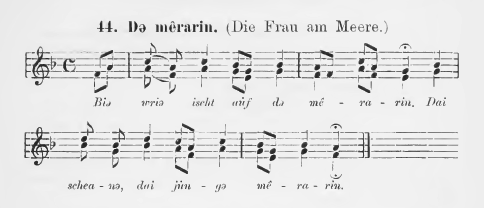
Melody and first strophe of the Gottscheer folk song Də mêrarin ("The Woman by the Sea")

Gottscheerish (Göttscheabarisch, German: Gottscheerisch, Slovene: kočevarščina) is an Upper German dialect which was the main language of communication among the Gottscheers in the enclave of Gottschee, Slovenia, before 1941. It is occasionally referred to as Granish or Granisch in the United States (< German Krainisch 'Carniolan'), a term also used for Slovene.

== Language history ==
Gottscheerish belongs to Southern Bavarian within the Bavarian dialect group. The Bavarian dialects of Carinthia are closest to it. Gottscheerish shares a lot of properties with the Bavarian dialects of the German language islands of the eastern Alps, among them Cimbrian in Veneto, Sappada (Pladen), and Timau (Tischelwang) in Friuli-Venezia Giulia, and Sorica (Zarz) in Upper Carniola (Slovenia).

Gottscheerish evolved independently for more than 600 years from the settlement of the first German-speaking settlers from Eastern Tyrol and Western Carinthia around 1330.

The Gottscheer Germans used Gottscheerish as oral language for daily communication, whereas their written language was Standard German. However, folk songs and folk tales collected in the 19th and 20th century have been published in Gottscheerish.

Already in the 19th century, many speakers of Gottscheerish left their homes to emigrate to the United States. After resettlement of most Gottscheers by the German occupation forces in 1941 during the Second World War, only a few hundred speakers of Gottscheerish remained in their homeland. After the war, Gottscheerish was forbidden in Yugoslavia.

== Present situation ==
According to the UNESCO, Gottscheerish is a "critically endangered language". The majority of its speakers live in the U.S., with a significant community in Queens, New York City. Most of them are of the oldest generation, who spent their childhood in Gottschee County. There are speakers in Canada, Austria and Germany as well; just as in the U.S., these populations have hardly any opportunity to practice it. Everyday language in the family and elsewhere is English and German or the local dialect, respectively.

In Slovenia, there are some families who preserved Gottscheerish in spite of the ban after World War II. Today, however, there are probably no more children learning it as first language. Most Gottscheerish speakers live in Moschnitze valley (Črmošnjiško-Poljanska dolina) between Kočevske Poljane and Črmošnjice, where some Gottscheer families collaborated with the partisan movement and therefore were allowed to stay.

== Written representation ==
As a primarily or exclusively spoken language, the written representation of Gottscheerish has varied considerably. The following table shows how some of the more problematic phonemes have been represented in different writing systems.

Phoneme	Schröer (1870)	Tschinkel (1908)	Schauer (1926)	Contemporary
/ɕ/	–	ṡ	–	–
/ɛ/	e	ä		
/ə/		ə	ä	ə
/j/	j	i̯	j	j
/kʰ/		kh	k	kh
/kx/		kχ		
/ɵ/	ö	ȯ	ó	ö
/s/	s, ß	s	ß	s, ß
/ʃ/	sch	š	sch	sch
/ts/	z	ts	z	ts
/tʃ/	tsch	tš	tsch	tsch
/ʉ/	ü	u̇	u	ü
/x/	ch	χ	ch	ch
/ʑ/	–	ż	–	–
/ʒ/	ş	ž	sh	sh

The symbol ə for schwa is frequently distorted in representations of Gottscheerish, incorrectly replaced by the partial differential symbol ∂ or umlauted ä.

== Phonology ==
The phonological inventory of Gottscheerish differs from standard German in a number of ways, especially regarding palatal consonants. The phonological inventory here is based on Hans Tschinkel's 1908 grammar. Tschinkel does not explicitly distinguish between phonemic and phonetic status.

=== Consonants ===
Consonants in parentheses are either phonetic/positional variants, idiolect variants, or dialect variants.

		Bilabial	Labiodental	Dental	Palatal	Velar	Pharyngeal
Plosive	voiceless	p		t		k	
Plosive	aspirate					kʰ	
Plosive	voiced	b		d		ɡ	
Fricative	voiceless		f	s	(ɕ) ʃ	x	h
Fricative	voiced	w	v	z	(ʑ) ʒ		
Affricate		pf		ts	tʃ	kx	
Nasal		m		n	(ɲ)	ŋ	
Trill				r			
Lateral				l	(ʎ)		

In the westernmost part of Gottschee, known as the Suchen Plateau (German: Suchener Hochtal), the phonemes /s/ and /ʃ/ merged to yield /ɕ/ and the phonemes /z/ and /ʒ/ merged to yield /ʑ/. The phoneme /r/ is rarely realized as [ʁ]. The phoneme /l/ is realized as [ʟ] after front vowels and after labial/velar obstruents.

=== Vowels ===
Tschinkel gives a large vowel inventory for Gottscheerish, especially for vowel clusters. He does not strictly distinguish between phonemic and phonetic values.

	Front	Central	Back
High	i iː	ʉ ʉː	u uː
Hi-Mid	e eː	ɵ ɵː	o oː
Lo-Mid	ɛ	ə	
Low		a aː	

Falling diphthongs: ai, ao, au, aʉ, ea, ei, ia, iə, oa, oɛ, oi, ou, ɵi, ɵʉ, ua, ui, uə, ʉi, ʉə, əi, aːi, aːo

Rising diphthongs: i̯a, i̯aː, i̯ɛ, i̯e, i̯eː, i̯i, i̯iː, i̯o, i̯oː, i̯ɵ, i̯ɵː, i̯u, i̯uː, i̯ʉ, i̯ʉː, i̯ə

Falling triphthongs: oai, uai, eau, iəu, ʉəu, oːai, uːai

Rising-falling triphthongs: i̯ai, i̯au, i̯aʉ, i̯ea, i̯ei, i̯iə, i̯ou, i̯ɵʉ, i̯uə, i̯əi, u̯ai

Tetraphthongs: i̯oai, i̯uai, i̯oːai, i̯uːai

== Grammar ==
=== Personal pronouns ===
The following pronouns are given in Hans Tschinkel's transcription.

	Singular					Plural			Formal (sg./pl.)
Case	1st person	2nd person	3rd person			1st person	2nd person	3rd person	2nd person
(English nominative)	I	you	he	it	she	we	you	they	you
Nominative	iχ, ī, i, iχχe	dū̇, du̇	ār, ar, a	īns, is, əs, ’s	žī, ži	biər, bər	iər, ər, dər	žai	žai
Genitive	maindər	daindər	žaindər (īmonš)		īrdər	inžər, inžə(r)dər	aijər, airər, aijə(r)dər	īr	īr
Dative	miər, miərə, mər	diər, diərə, dər	īmon (īmonə), mon		īr (īrə), ir	inš	ai	in, ən, ’n, nən	in, ən, ’n, nən
Accusative	mī, mi	dī, di	in, ən, ’n	īns, əs, ’s	žai, žə	inš	ai	žai, žə, ž’	žai, žə, ž’

=== Numbers ===
The following numbers are given in abridged form in Hans Tschinkel's transcription.

Number	Gottscheerish
1	uains
2	tsboai
3	drai
4	viər
5	vemf
6	žekš
7	žībm
8	oχt
9	nain
10	tsēhŋ

Number	Gottscheerish
11	uaindlof
12	tsbelf
13	draitsain
14	viərttsain
15	vu̇ftsain, vemftsain
16	žaχtsain
17	žimtsain
18	oχtsain
19	naintsain
20	tsbȯntsikh

Number	Gottscheerish
21	uian-in-tsbȯntsikh
22	tsboai-in-tsbȯntsikh
23	drai-in-tsbȯntsikh
24	viər-in-tsbȯntsikh
25	vemv-in-tsbȯntsikh
30	draisikh
40	viərttsikh
50	vu̇ftsikh, vemftsikh
60	žaχtsikh
70	žimtsikh

Number	Gottscheerish
80	oχtsikh
90	naintsikh
100	hu̇ndərt
101	hu̇ndərt-uain
110	hu̇ndərt-tsēhŋ
200	tsbianhu̇ndərt, tsboaihu̇ndərt
300	draihu̇ndərt
1,000	tau̇žnt
2,000	tsbaintau̇žnt, tsboaitau̇žnt
1,000,000	miliōn

== Examples ==
A text in Karl Schröer's orthography (1870):

Gottscheerish	German	English
Bie wrüe işt auf dar Hanşel junc, ar stéanot şmóaronş gûr wrüe auf, ar legot şih gûr schíander ån, ar géanot ahin of es kîrtàgle.	Wie früh ist auf der Hänsel jung, er stund des morgens gar früh auf, er legte sich gar schön (schöner) an, er gieng hin auf den Jahrmarkt.	How early young Johnny is up, He got up very early this morning, He put on his fine clothes, He went to the parish fair.

A text partially based on Hans Tschinkel's orthography (ca. 1908):

Gottscheerish (Note: The spelling and first two lines of this verse (Ammoin, Attoin) by Wilhelm Tschinkel differ considerably among publications.)	German	English
Du̇ hoscht lai oin Ammoin, oin Attoin dərzu̇ə, du̇ hoscht lai oin Hoimət, Gottschəabarschər Pu̇ə.	Du hast nur eine Mutter einen Vater dazu, du hast nur eine Heimat, Gottscheer Bub.	You have only one mother One father as well. You have only one homeland, Gottschee boy.

== Bibliography ==
- Karl Julius Schröer: Wörterbuch der Mundart von Gottschee. K. k. Hof- und Staatsdruckerei, Wien 1870.
- Adolf Hauffen: Die deutsche Sprachinsel Gottschee. Geschichte und Mundart, Lebensverhältnisse, Sitten und Gebräuche, Sagen, Märchen und Lieder. K. k. Universitäts-Buchdruckerei und Verlags-Buchhandlung ‚Styria‘, Graz 1895. S. 19-33: Die Gottscheer Mundart.
- Hans Tschinkel: Grammatik der Gottscheer Mundart. Niemeyer, Halle a. S. 1908.
- Walter Tschinkel: Wörterbuch der Gottscheer Mundart. 2 Bände. Mit Illustrationen von Anni Tschinkel. Studien zur Österreichisch-Bairischen Dialektkunde. Verlag der Österreichischen Akademie der Wissenschaften, Wien 1973.
- Maridi Tscherne: Du höscht lai oin Hoimöt. Domovina je ena sama. Pesmarica pesmi v kočevarskem narečju. Slovensko kočevarsko društvo Peter Kosler, Ljubljana 2010.
- Maridi Tscherne: Beartərpiəchla - Göttscheabarisch-Kroinarisch. Kočevarsko-slovenski slovarček. Zavod za ohranitev kulturne dediščine Nesseltal Koprivnik, Koprivnik/Nesseltal 2010.
