= Coklovca =

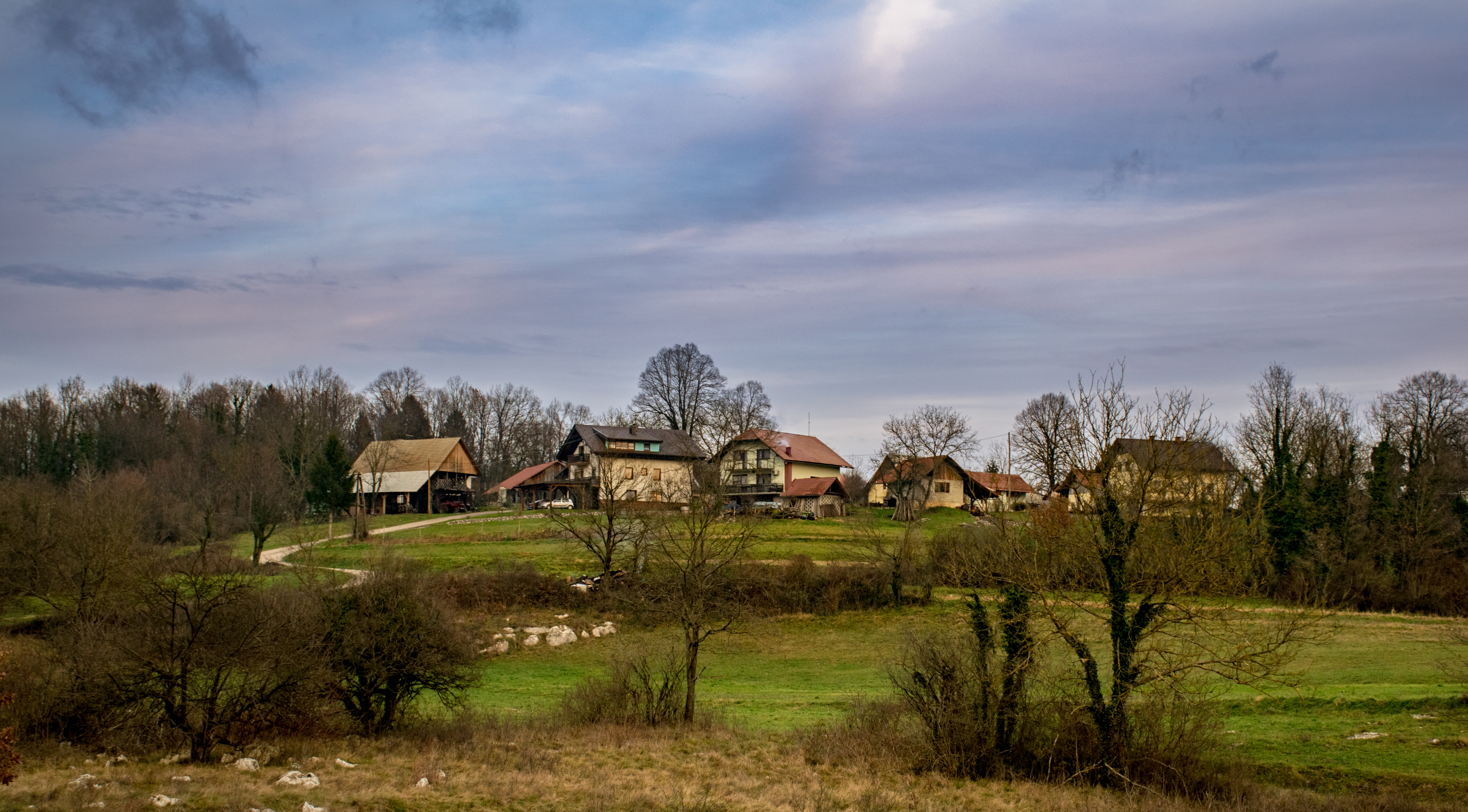

- Location in Slovenia
- Coordinates: 45°39′13″N 15°11′40″E
- Country: Slovenia
- Traditional region: Lower Carniola
- Statistical region: Southeast Slovenia
- Municipality: Semič
- Elevation: 220 m (720 ft)

Coklovca (Slovene pronunciation: [ˈtsoːklɔu̯tsa], in older sources Coklavica, German: Zoklouze) is a former settlement in the Municipality of Semič in southeastern Slovenia. It is now part of the town of Semič. The area is part of the traditional region of Lower Carniola. The municipality is now included in the Southeast Slovenia Statistical Region.

== Geography ==
Coklovca is a clustered settlement on a small hill about 400 meters (1,300 ft) east-northeast of the cemetery in Semič. It is surrounded by fields and wooded land, where beech and oak predominate. There is a spring below the village to the west. The soil is loamy and stony, and it has poor fertility. The village has a Roma population.

== History ==
Coklovca was annexed by the town of Semič in 2001, ending its existence as a separate village.
