= Mišače =

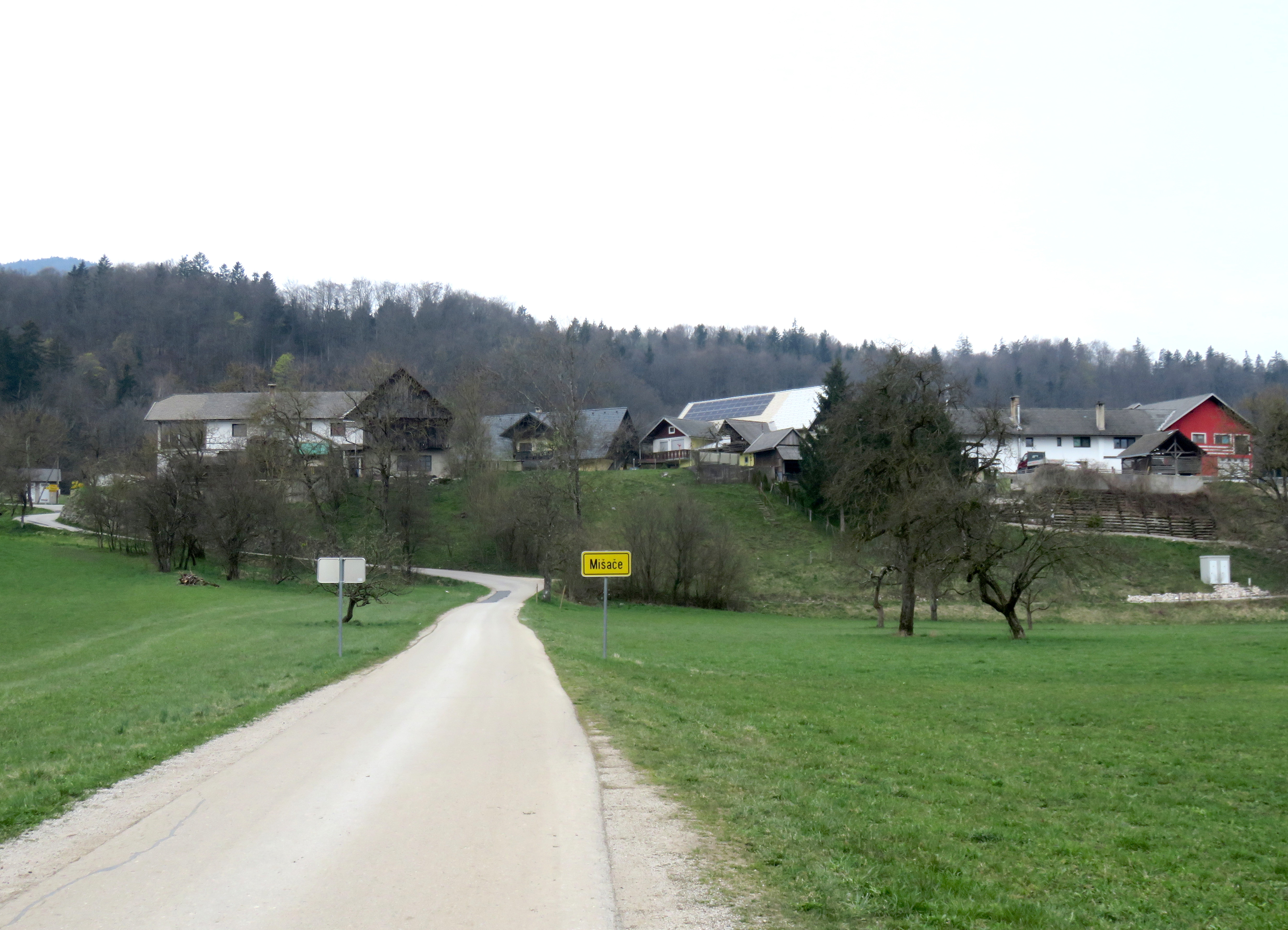

- Location in Slovenia
- Coordinates: 46°18′54″N 14°12′46.35″E
- Country: Slovenia
- Traditional region: Upper Carniola
- Statistical region: Upper Carniola
- Municipality: Radovljica
- Elevation: 441.1 m (1,447 ft)

Population (2002)
  - Total: 66

Mišače (pronounced [miˈʃaːtʃɛ]) is a small settlement on the road from Globoko to Otoče in the Municipality of Radovljica in the Upper Carniola region of Slovenia.

== Name ==
Mišače was attested in written sources as Meyssach in 1368 and as Mischacz in 1498.
