= Vošče =

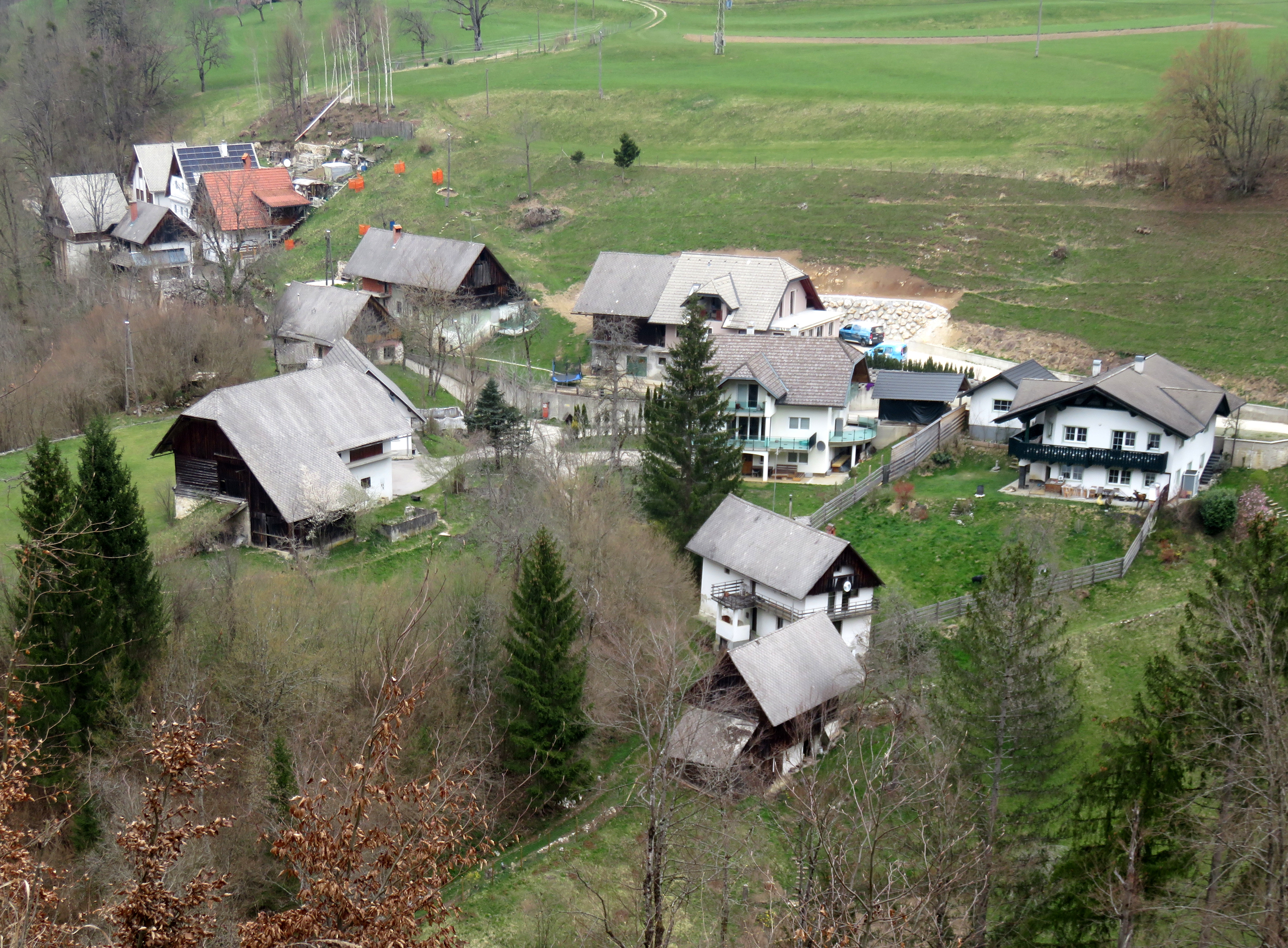

- Location in Slovenia
- Coordinates: 46°19′47.04″N 14°8′48.06″E
- Country: Slovenia
- Region: Upper Carniola
- Statistical region: Upper Carniola
- Municipality: Radovljica
- Elevation: 531.6 m (1,744 ft)

Population (2002)
  - Total: 43

Vošče (pronounced [ˈʋoːʃtʃɛ]) is a settlement in the Municipality of Radovljica in the Upper Carniola region of Slovenia.
