= Posavec, Radovljica =

Posavec
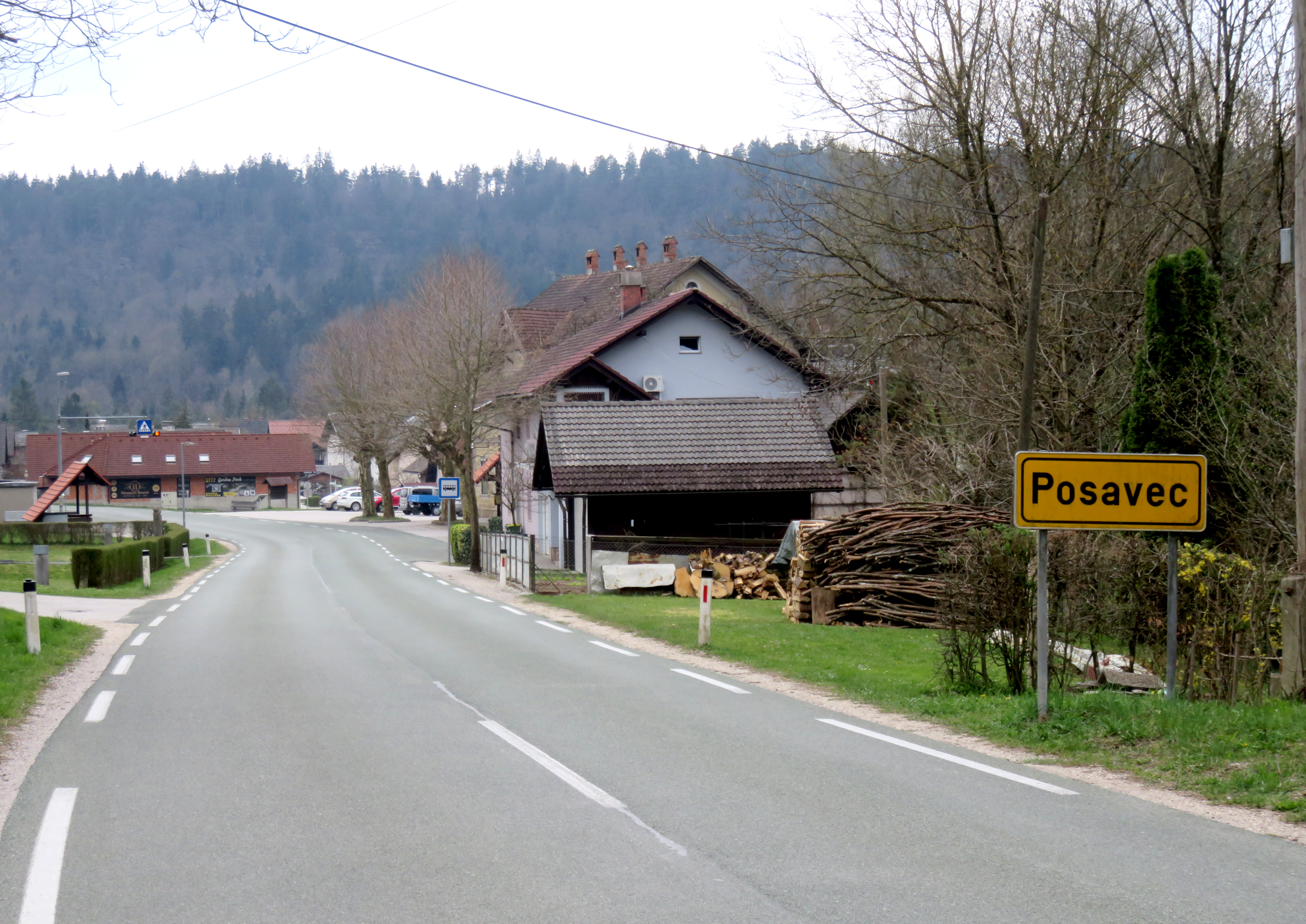

- Location in Slovenia
- Coordinates: 46°18′34.3″N 14°14′30.86″E
- Country: Slovenia
- Region: Upper Carniola
- Statistical region: Upper Carniola
- Municipality: Radovljica
- Elevation: 394 m (1,293 ft)

Population (2002)
  - Total: 373

Posavec (pronounced [pɔˈsaːʋəts], German: Posautz) is a settlement on the Sava River in the Municipality of Radovljica in the Upper Carniola region of Slovenia.
