= Dobravica, Radovljica =

Dobravica
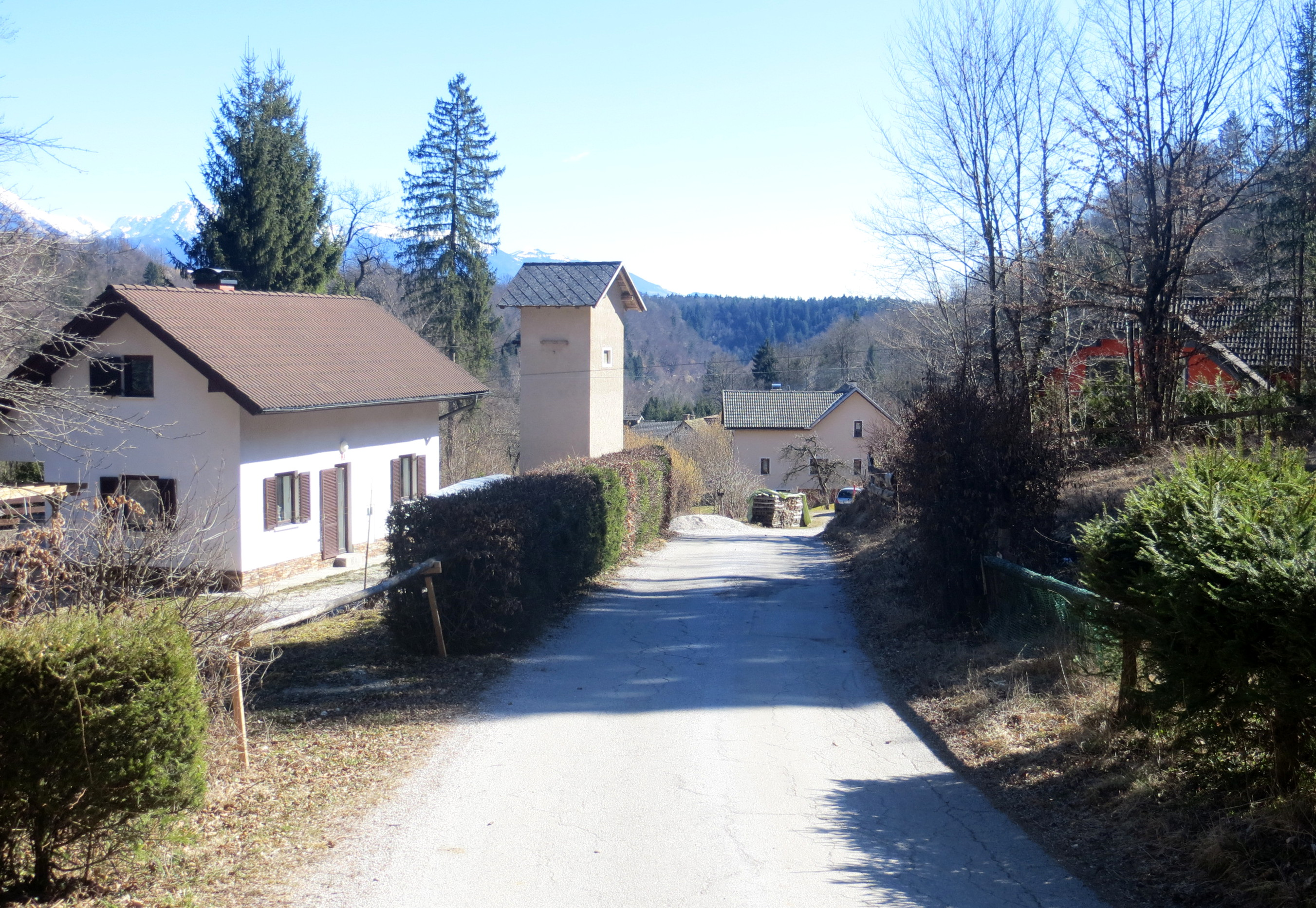

- Location in Slovenia
- Coordinates: 46°17′26.55″N 14°14′21.52″E
- Country: Slovenia
- Traditional region: Upper Carniola
- Statistical region: Upper Carniola
- Municipality: Radovljica
- Elevation: 432.7 m (1,420 ft)

Population (2002)
  - Total: 21

Dobravica (pronounced [dɔˈbɾaːʋitsa]) is a small settlement in the Municipality of Radovljica in the Upper Carniola region of Slovenia.
