= Ravnica, Radovljica =

Ravnica Mošnja (until 1955)
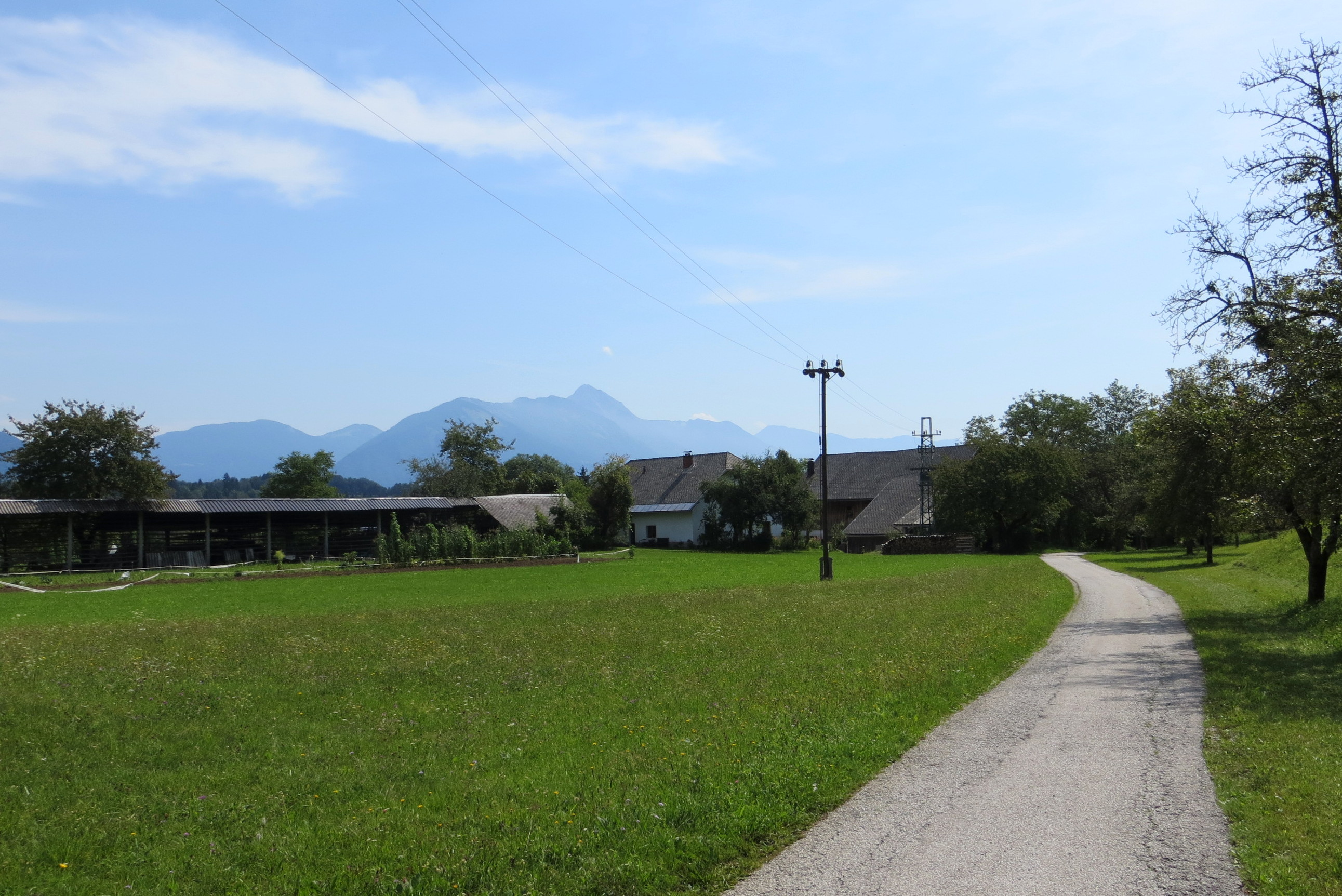

- Location in Slovenia
- Coordinates: 46°19′32.18″N 14°11′6.69″E
- Country: Slovenia
- Region: Upper Carniola
- Statistical region: Upper Carniola
- Municipality: Radovljica
- Elevation: 461.4 m (1,514 ft)

Population (2025)
  - Total: 34

Ravnica (pronounced [ɾau̯ˈniːtsa]) is a settlement in the Municipality of Radovljica in the Upper Carniola region of Slovenia.

== Name ==
The name of the settlement was changed from Mošnja to Ravnica in 1955.
