= Zapuže, Radovljica =

Zapuže
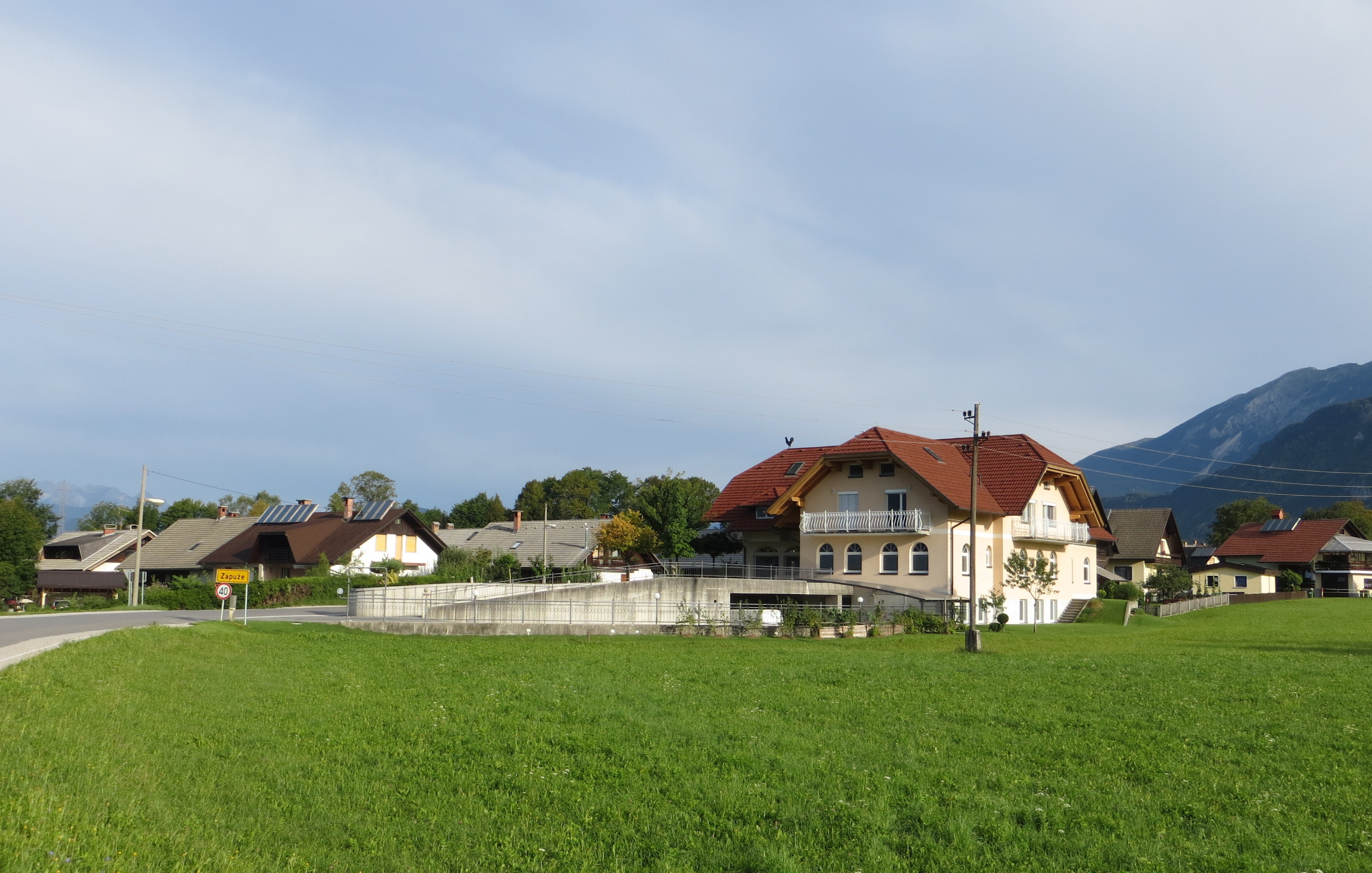

- Location in Slovenia
- Coordinates: 46°21′15.97″N 14°11′34.09″E
- Country: Slovenia
- Region: Upper Carniola
- Statistical region: Upper Carniola
- Municipality: Radovljica
- Elevation: 537.1 m (1,762 ft)

Population (2002)
  - Total: 389

Zapuže (pronounced [ˈzaːpuʒɛ]) is a settlement in the Municipality of Radovljica in the Upper Carniola region of Slovenia.
