= Praproše =

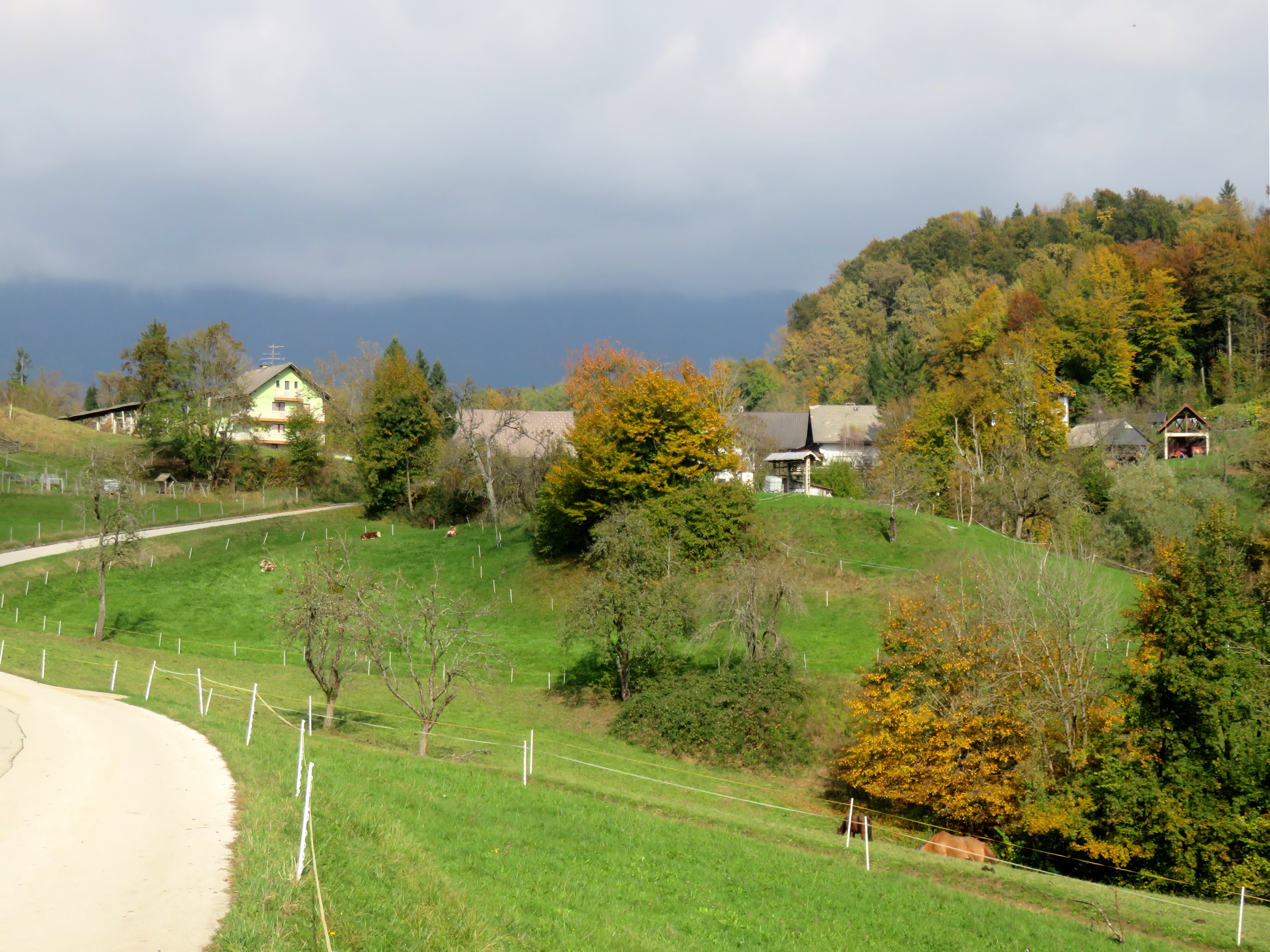

- Location in Slovenia
- Coordinates: 46°19′46.75″N 14°15′3.53″E
- Country: Slovenia
- Region: Upper Carniola
- Statistical region: Upper Carniola
- Municipality: Radovljica
- Elevation: 480.1 m (1,575 ft)

Population (2002)
  - Total: 26

Praproše (pronounced [ˈpɾaːpɾɔʃɛ], in some sources also Praproče) is a settlement in the Municipality of Radovljica in the Upper Carniola region of Slovenia.
