= Municipality of Radovljica =

Municipality of Slovenia

Municipality of Radovljica Občina Radovljica
- Municipality
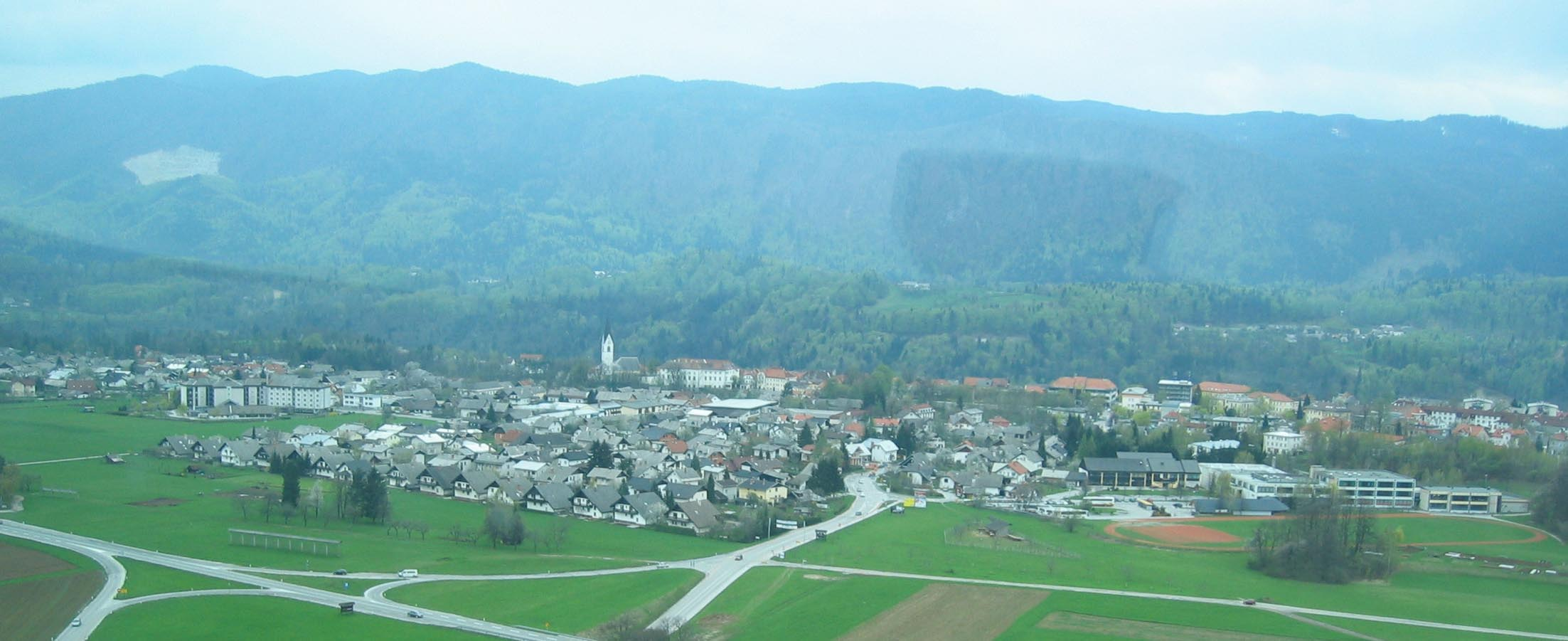

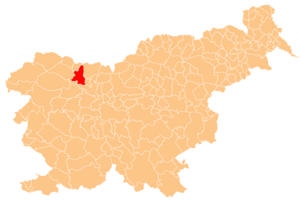
- Location of the Municipality of Radovljica in Slovenia
- Coordinates: 46°21′N 14°10′E
- Country: Slovenia

Government
  - Mayor: Ciril Globočnik

Area
  - Total: 118.7 km^{2} (45.8 sq mi)

Population (2002)
  - Total: 18,164
  - Density: 153.0/km^{2} (396.3/sq mi)
- Time zone: UTC+01 (CET)
  - Summer (DST): UTC+02 (CEST)
- Website: www.radovljica.si

The Municipality of Radovljica (pronounced [ɾaˈdoːu̯ljitsa]; Slovene: Občina Radovljica) is a municipality in the Upper Carniola region of northern Slovenia. The administrative seat of the municipality is the town of Radovljica.

== Geography ==
The municipality has around 18,000 inhabitants and an area of 118 square kilometres (46 sq mi). It is located at the southern slope of the Karawanks mountain range at the confluence of the Sava Dolinka and the Sava Bohinjka, both headwaters of the Sava River.

== Settlements ==
In addition to the municipal seat of Radovljica, the municipality also includes the following settlements:

- Begunje na Gorenjskem
- Brda
- Brezje
- Brezovica
- Češnjica pri Kropi
- Črnivec
- Dobravica
- Dobro Polje
- Dvorska Vas
- Globoko
- Gorica
- Hlebce
- Hraše
- Kamna Gorica
- Kropa
- Lancovo
- Lesce
- Lipnica
- Ljubno
- Mišače
- Mlaka
- Mošnje
- Noše
- Nova Vas pri Lescah
- Otoče
- Ovsiše
- Peračica
- Podnart
- Poljče
- Poljšica pri Podnartu
- Posavec
- Praproše
- Prezrenje
- Ravnica
- Rovte
- Slatna
- Spodnja Dobrava
- Spodnja Lipnica
- Spodnji Otok
- Srednja Dobrava
- Srednja Vas
- Studenčice
- Vošče
- Vrbnje
- Zadnja Vas
- Zaloše
- Zapuže
- Zgornja Dobrava
- Zgornja Lipnica
- Zgornji Otok
- Zgoša
