= Dvorska Vas, Radovljica =

Dvorska Vas
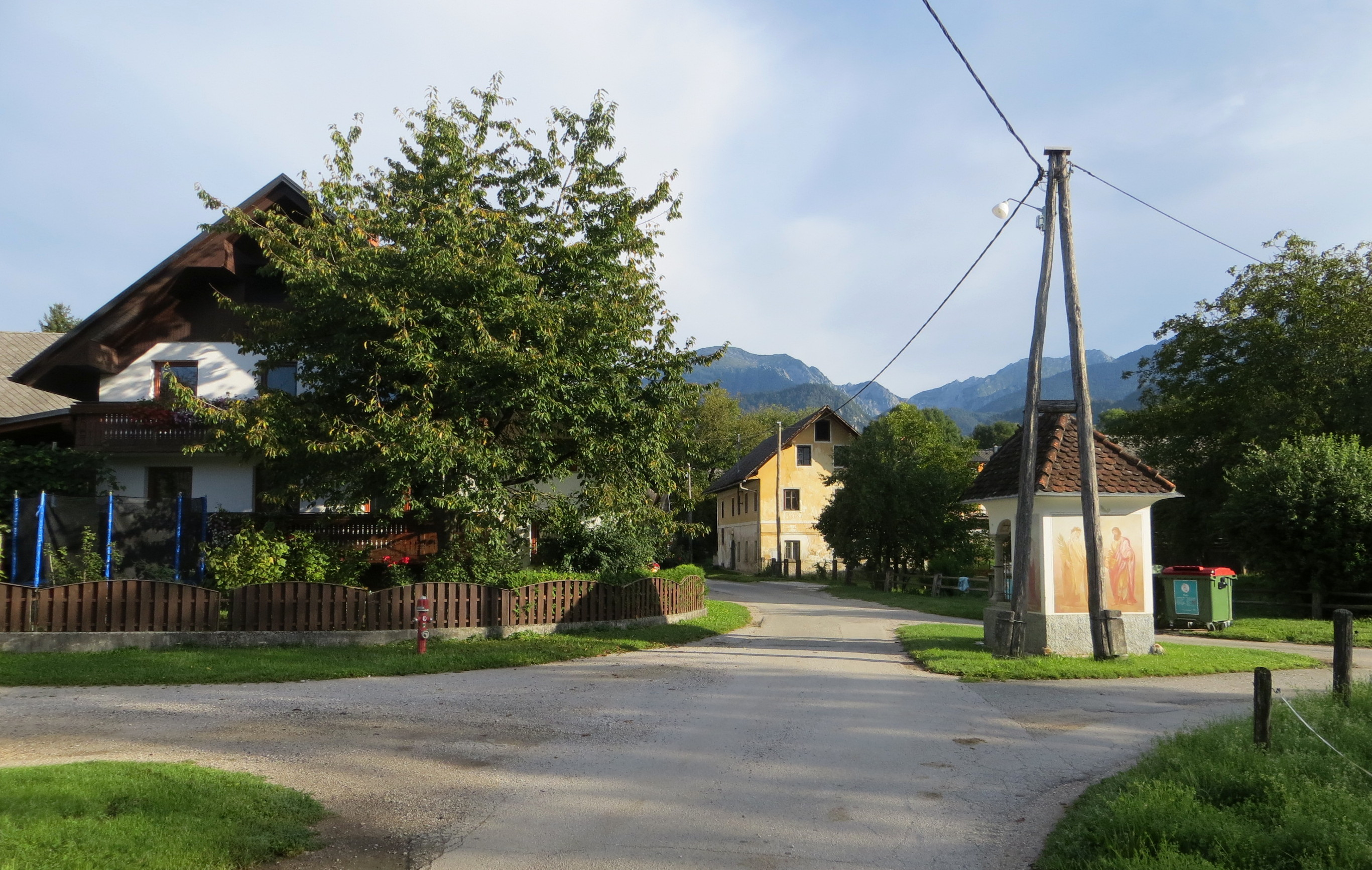

- Location in Slovenia
- Coordinates: 46°21′36.38″N 14°12′13.62″E
- Country: Slovenia
- Traditional region: Upper Carniola
- Statistical region: Upper Carniola
- Municipality: Radovljica
- Elevation: 526.9 m (1,729 ft)

Population (2002)
  - Total: 179

Dvorska Vas (pronounced [ˈdʋoːɾska ˈʋaːs]; Slovene: Dvorska vas, German: Hofdorf) is a settlement in the Municipality of Radovljica in the Upper Carniola region of Slovenia.
