= Ovsiše =

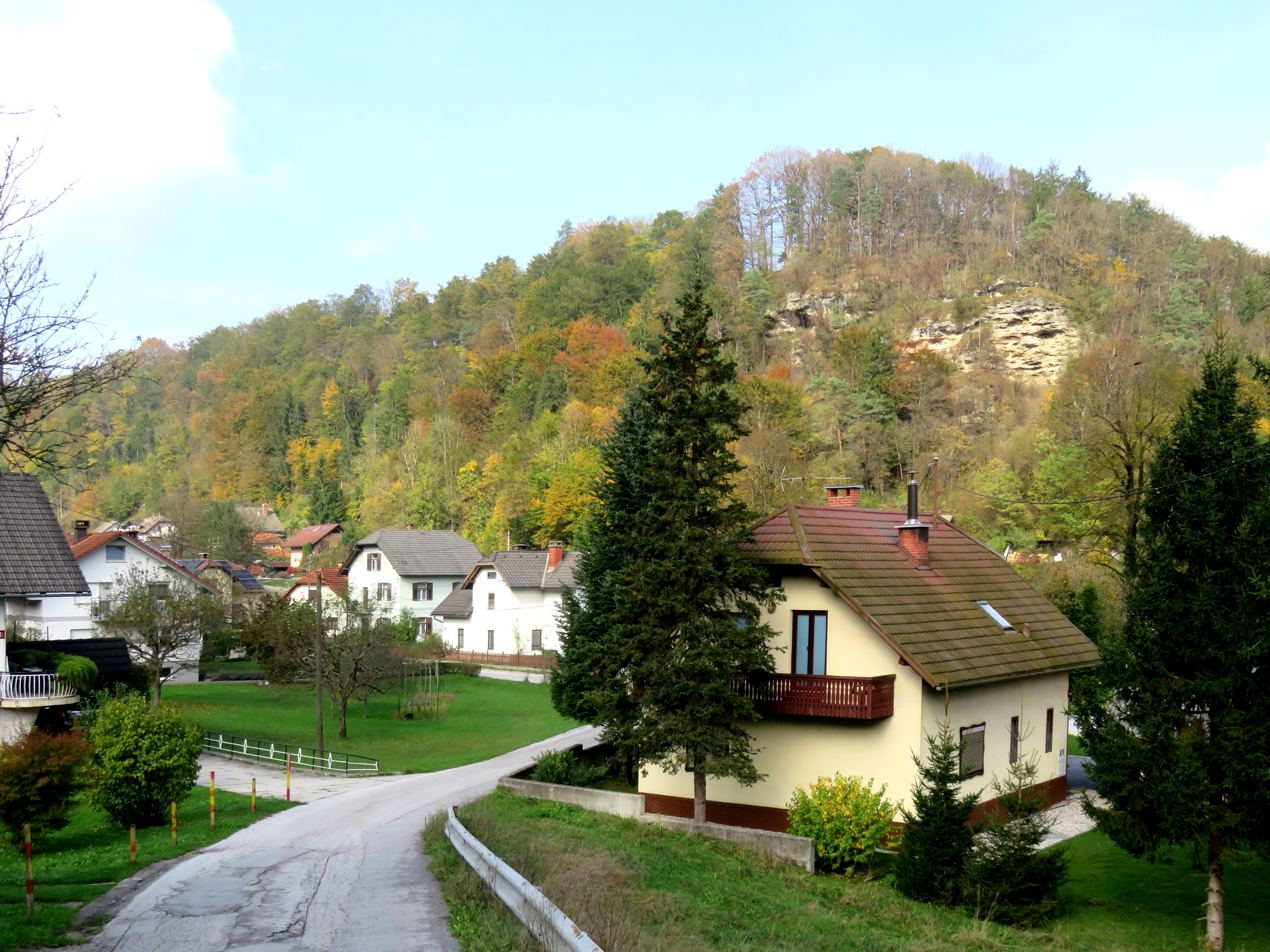

- Location in Slovenia
- Coordinates: 46°17′13″N 14°15′20.11″E
- Country: Slovenia
- Region: Upper Carniola
- Statistical region: Upper Carniola
- Municipality: Radovljica
- Elevation: 407.8 m (1,338 ft)

Population (2002)
  - Total: 213

Ovsiše (pronounced [ɔu̯ˈsiːʃɛ], in older sources also Olšiše, German: Ouschische) is a village in the Municipality of Radovljica in the Upper Carniola region of Slovenia.

== Name ==
Ovsiše was attested in historical sources as Harlant in 1291, and as Haberlandt and Ousischo in 1481.

== Church ==
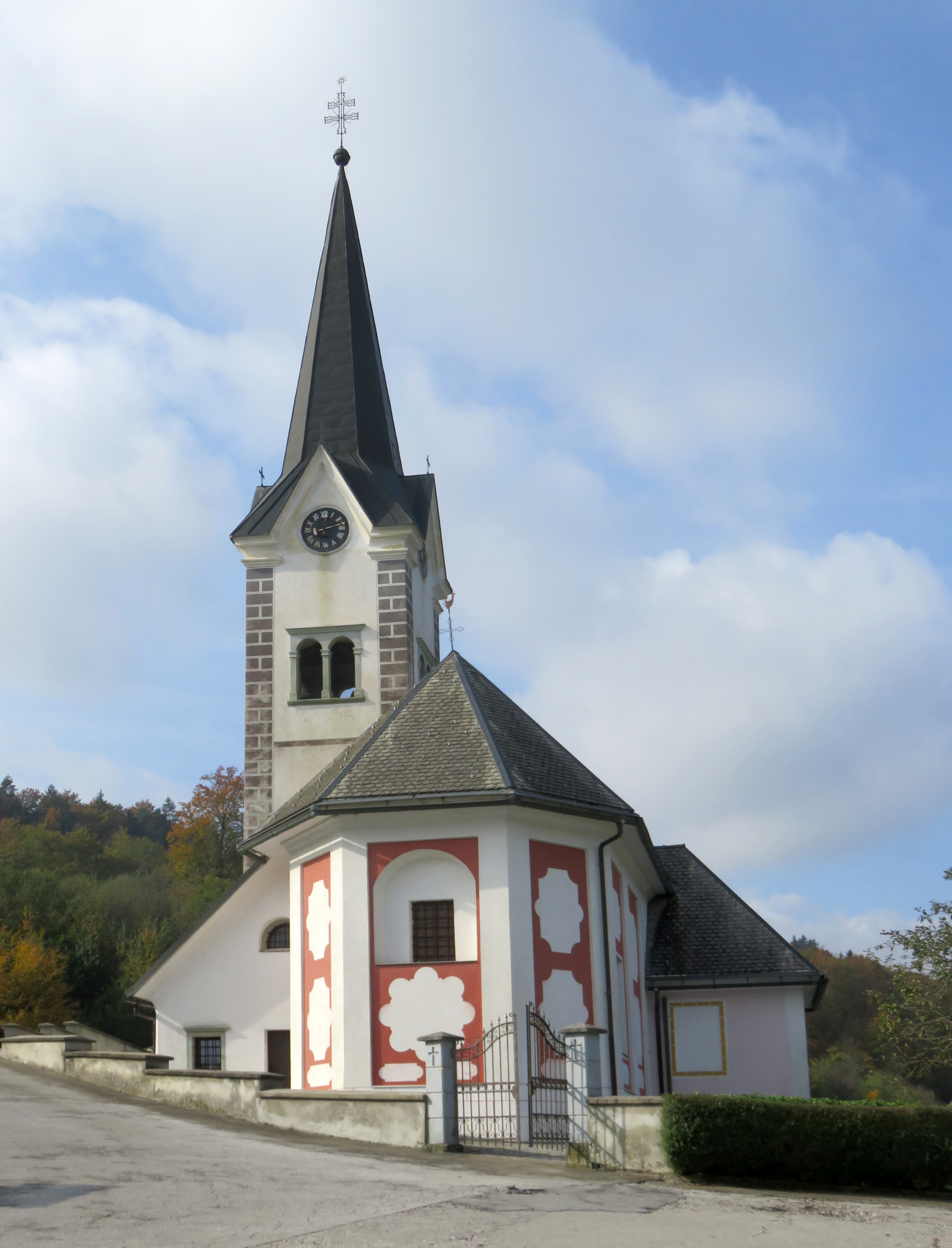
Saint Nicholas's Church

The village church is dedicated to Saint Nicholas.
