= Nova Vas pri Lescah =

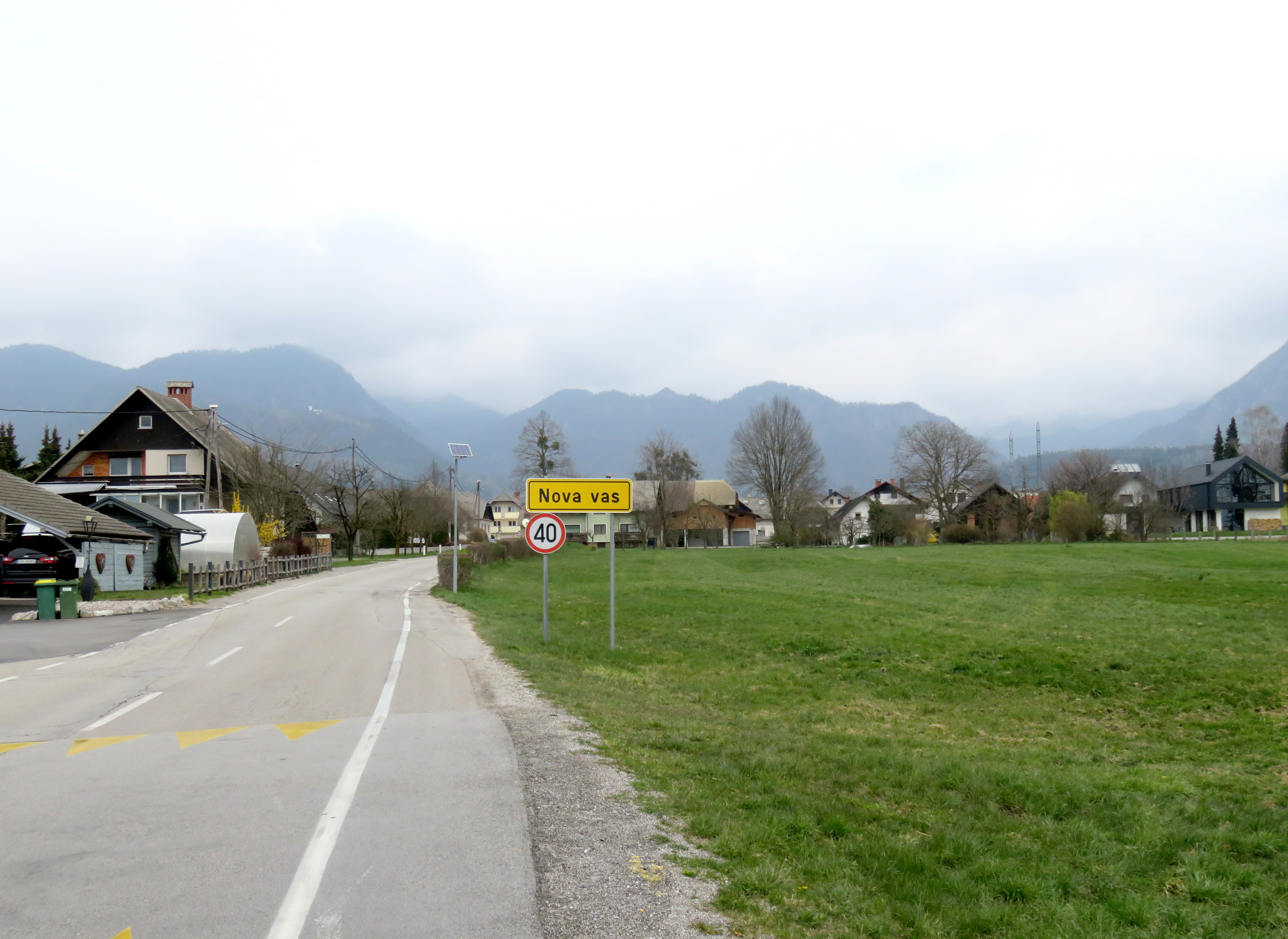

- Location in Slovenia
- Coordinates: 46°21′32.4″N 14°11′15.2″E
- Country: Slovenia
- Traditional region: Upper Carniola
- Statistical region: Upper Carniola
- Municipality: Radovljica
- Elevation: 521.1 m (1,710 ft)

Population (2002)
  - Total: 179

Nova Vas pri Lescah (pronounced [ˈnɔːʋa ˈʋaːs pɾi lɛˈstsax]; Slovene: Nova vas pri Lescah) is a settlement near Lesce in the Municipality of Radovljica in the Upper Carniola region of Slovenia.

== Name ==
The name of the settlement was changed from Nova vas to Nova vas pri Lescah in 1955.

== Cultural heritage ==
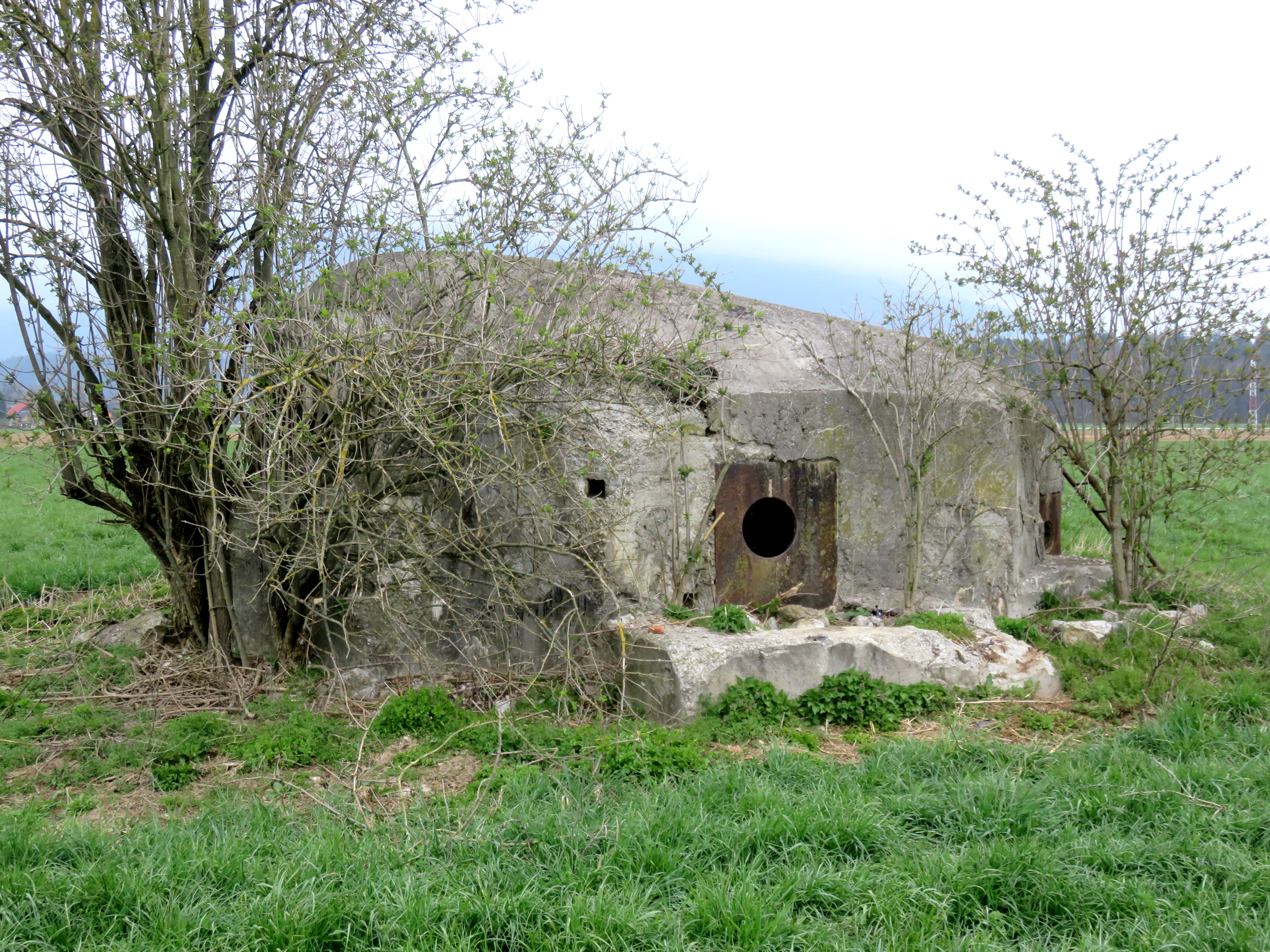
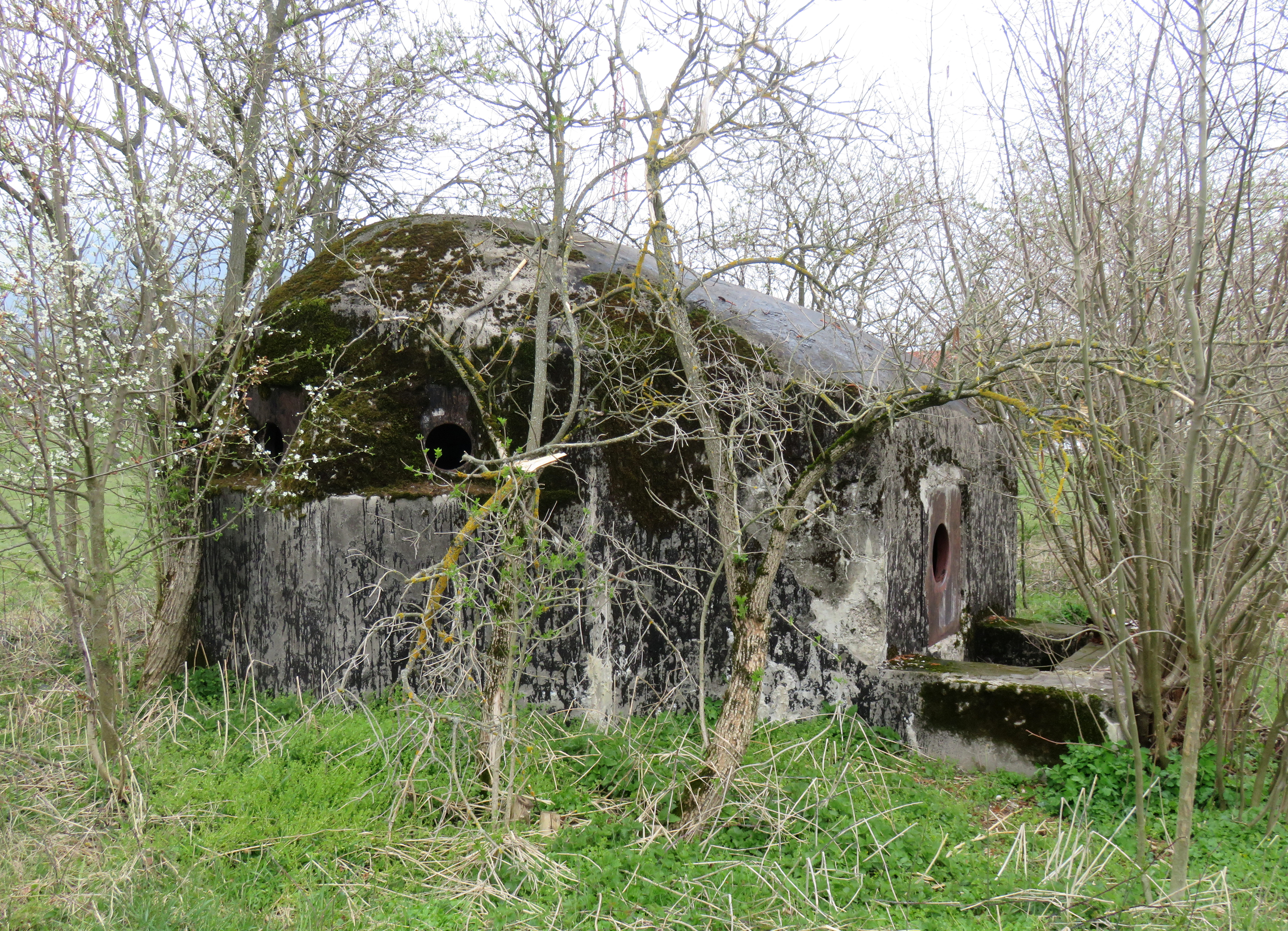
Bunkers in Nova Vas pri Lescah

There are two bunkers in Nova Vas pri Lescah. They were built as part of the Rupnik Line and date from 1936–1937. Both bunkers stand southwest of the village and were designed to protect the Lesce airfield.
