= Češnjica pri Kropi =

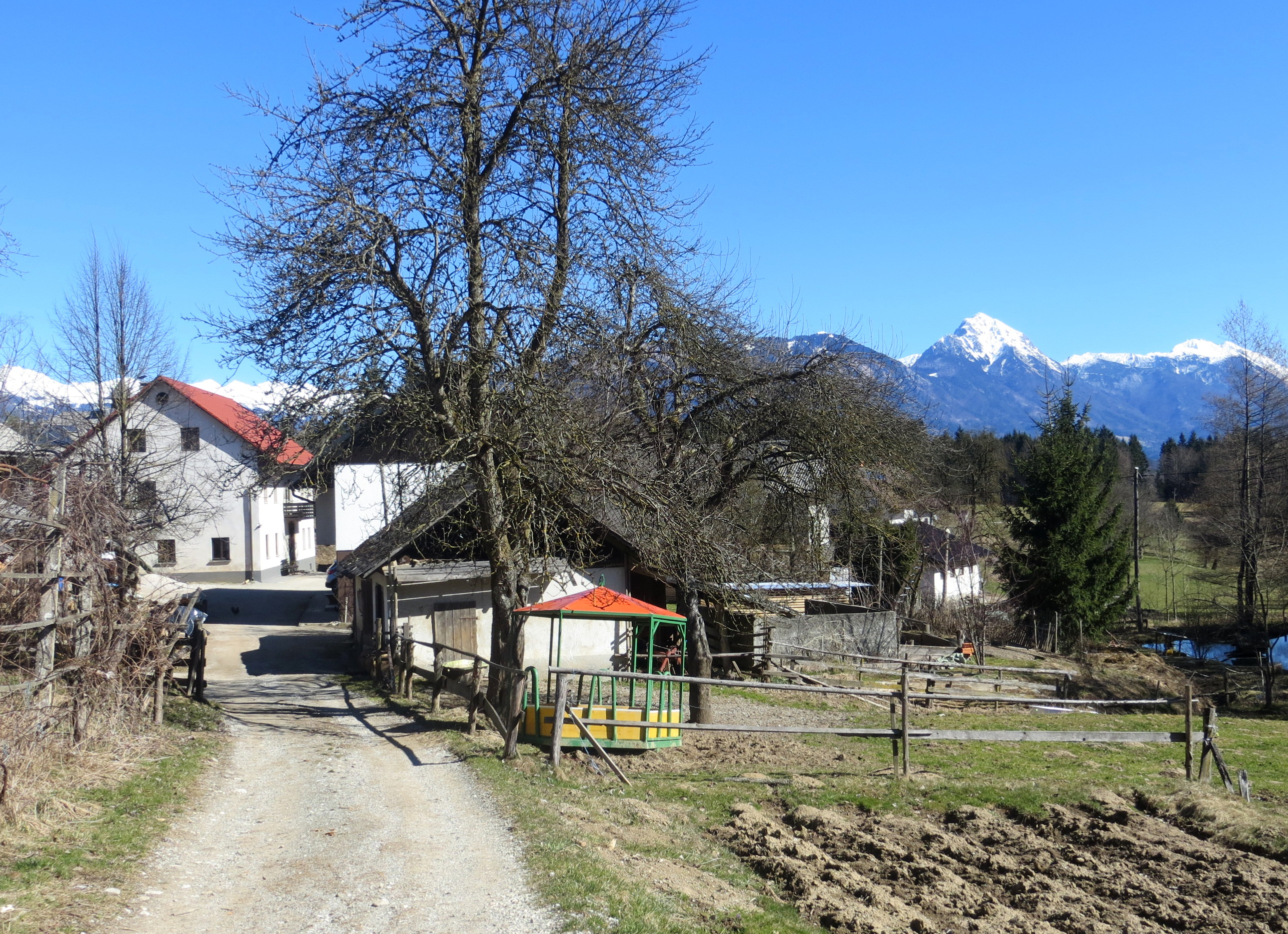

- Location in Slovenia
- Coordinates: 46°17′15.91″N 14°13′41.48″E
- Country: Slovenia
- Traditional region: Upper Carniola
- Statistical region: Upper Carniola
- Municipality: Radovljica
- Elevation: 486.7 m (1,597 ft)

Population (2002)
  - Total: 118

Češnjica pri Kropi (pronounced [ˈtʃeːʃnjitsa pɾi ˈkɾoːpi]) is a village near Kropa in the Municipality of Radovljica in the Upper Carniola region of Slovenia.

== Name ==
The name of the settlement was changed from Češnjica to Češnjica pri Kropi in 1952.

== Church ==
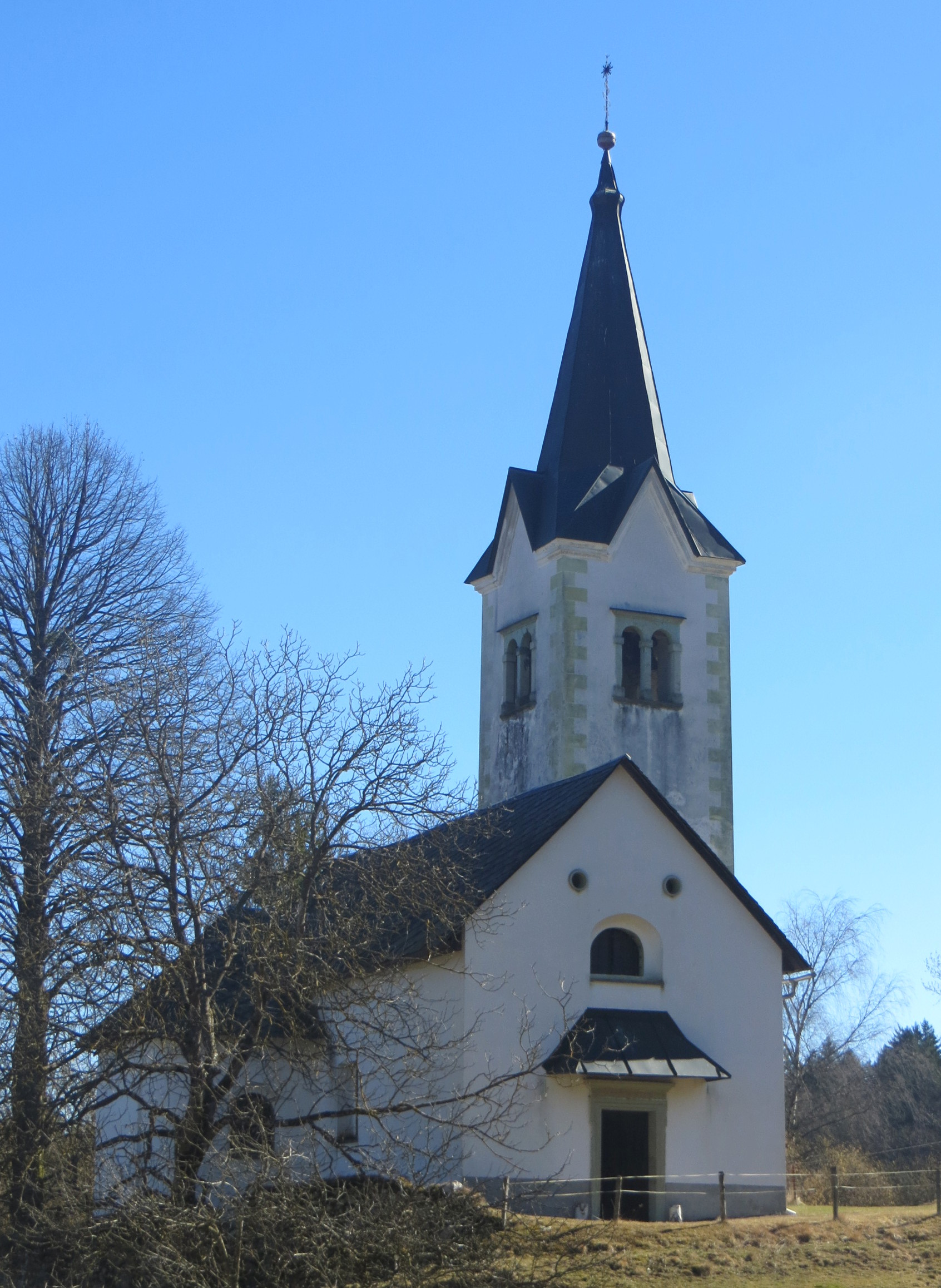
Saint Thomas's Church

The church in Češnjica pri Kropi is dedicated to Saint Thomas. It was built in 1696 and renovated in 1763 and 1814. The church is decorated in a simple Baroque style.
