= Zgoša =

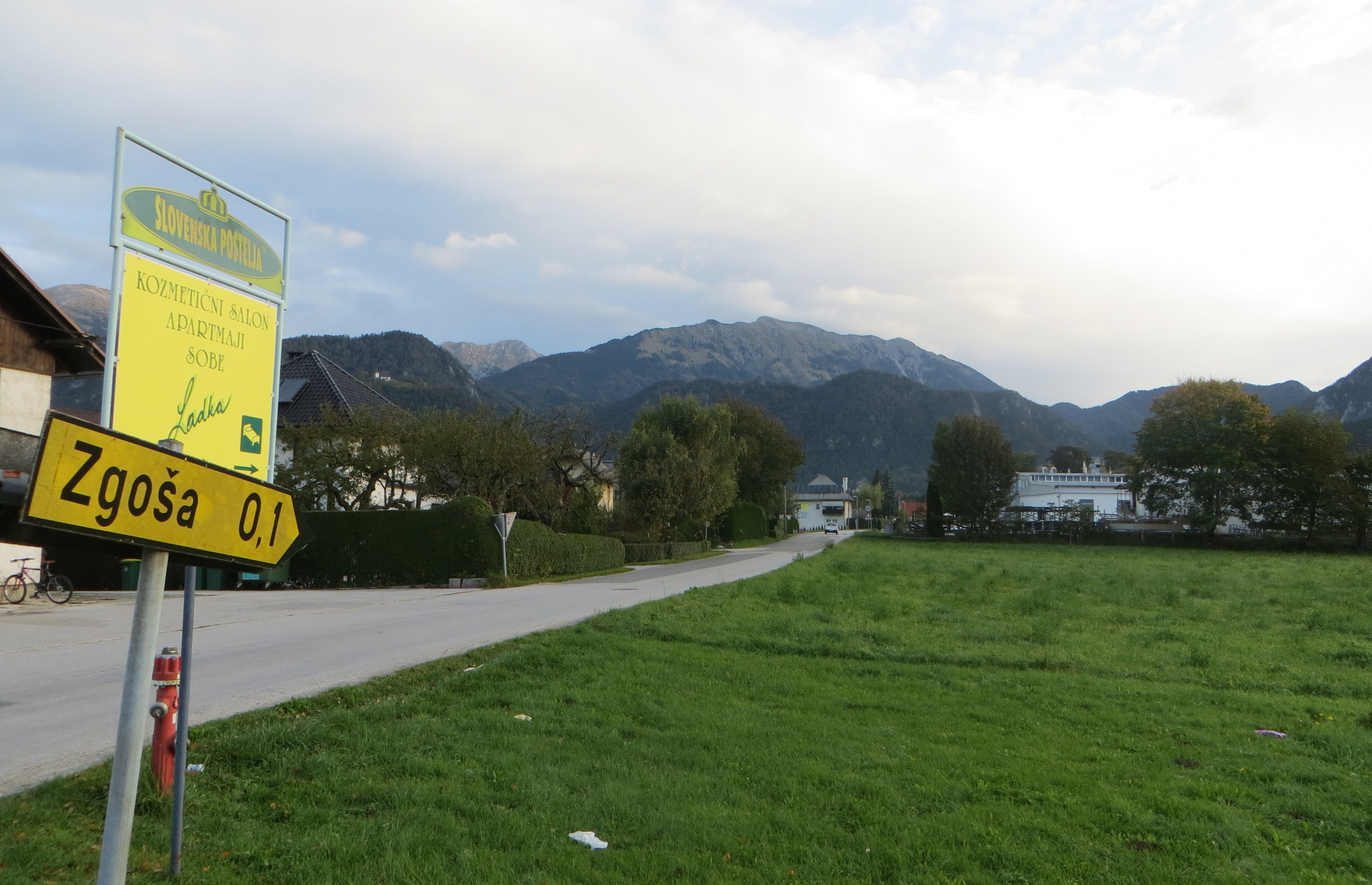

- Location in Slovenia
- Coordinates: 46°22′8.91″N 14°11′47.88″E
- Country: Slovenia
- Region: Upper Carniola
- Statistical region: Upper Carniola
- Municipality: Radovljica
- Elevation: 552.7 m (1,813 ft)

Population (2002)
  - Total: 313

Zgoša (pronounced [ˈzɡoːʃa]) is a settlement in the Municipality of Radovljica in the Upper Carniola region of Slovenia.

== Name ==
Zgoša was first attested in written sources as Guscha in 1075 (and as Goscha in 1085, Sgusch in 1394, and Zguoch in 1406). The name derives from *Zgošča, created from a nominalized possessive adjective based on the personal name *Zgost. The name is believed to originally be a hydronym, *Zgošča (reka/voda) (literally, 'river/creek where Zgost lives'), shortened through ellipsis and the Upper Carniolan phonological development-šč- > -š-. Zgoša Creek, which flows through the settlement, is also referred to as Begunščica Creek today.
