= Studenčice, Radovljica =

Studenčice
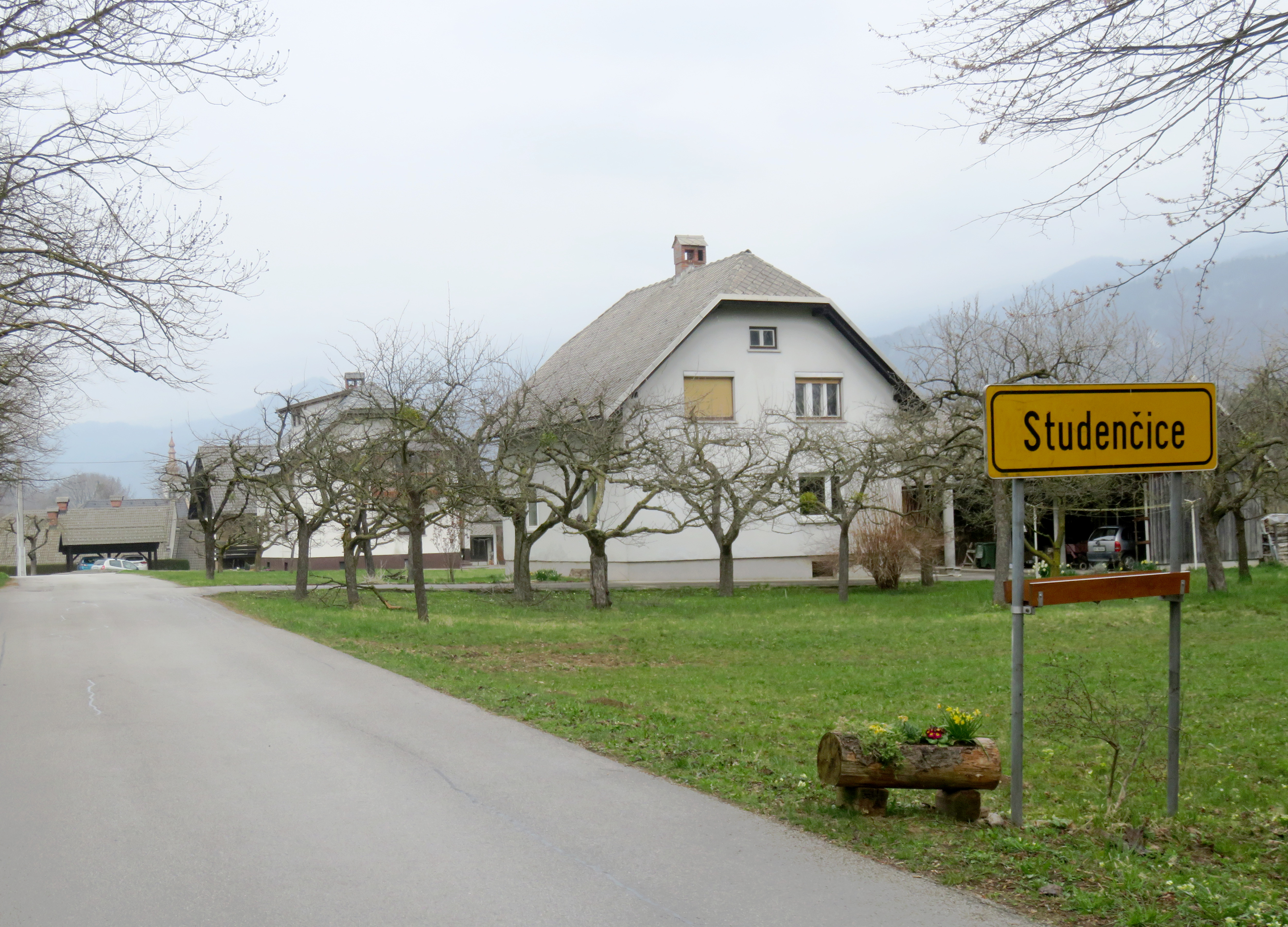

- Location in Slovenia
- Coordinates: 46°22′37.78″N 14°9′38.29″E
- Country: Slovenia
- Region: Upper Carniola
- Statistical region: Upper Carniola
- Municipality: Radovljica
- Elevation: 521 m (1,709 ft)

Population (2002)
  - Total: 97

Studenčice (pronounced [stuˈdɛːntʃitsɛ]) is a village in the Municipality of Radovljica in the Upper Carniola region of Slovenia.

== Church ==
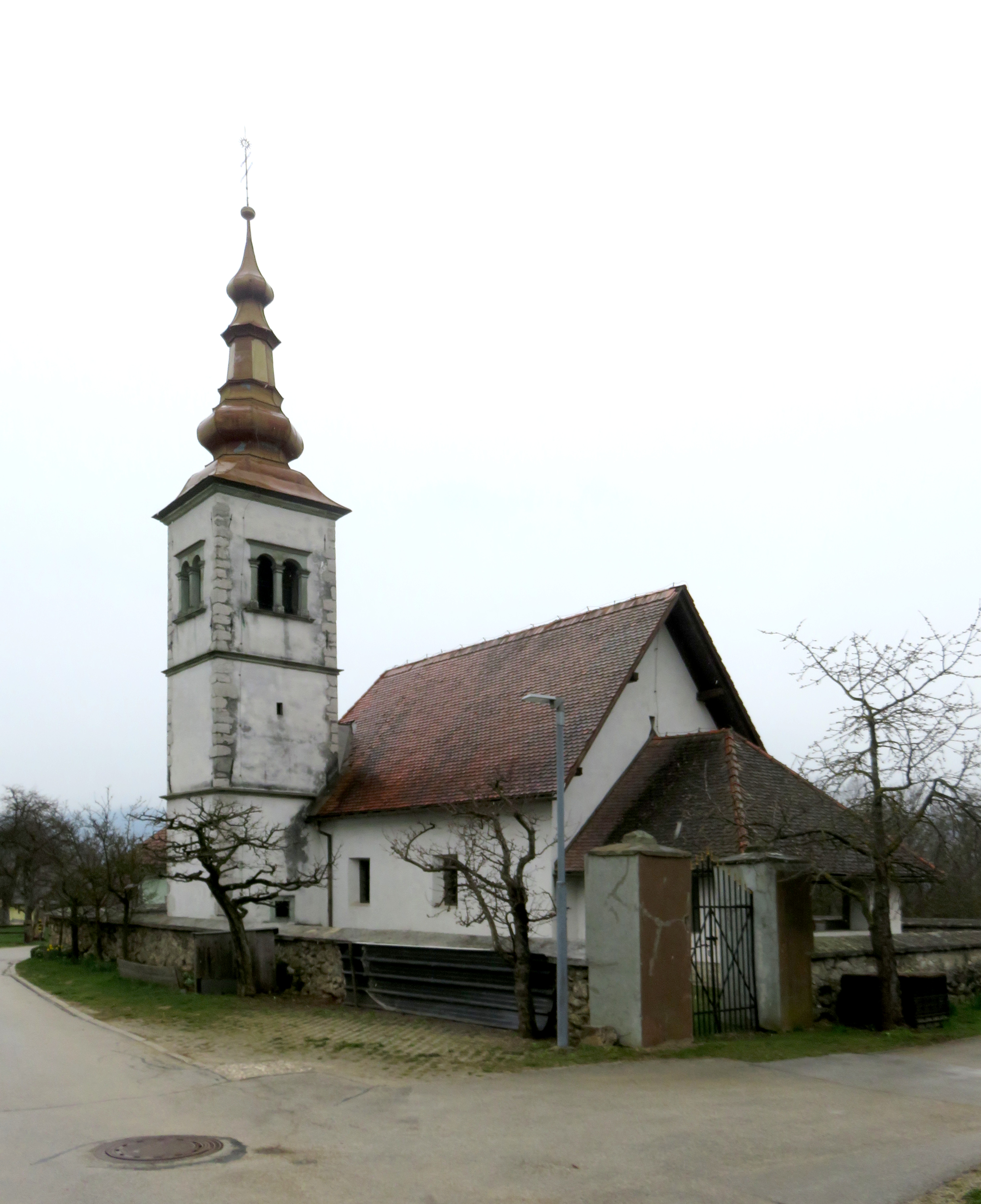
Saint Florian's Church

The village church is dedicated to Saint Florian.
