= Hraše, Radovljica =

Hraše
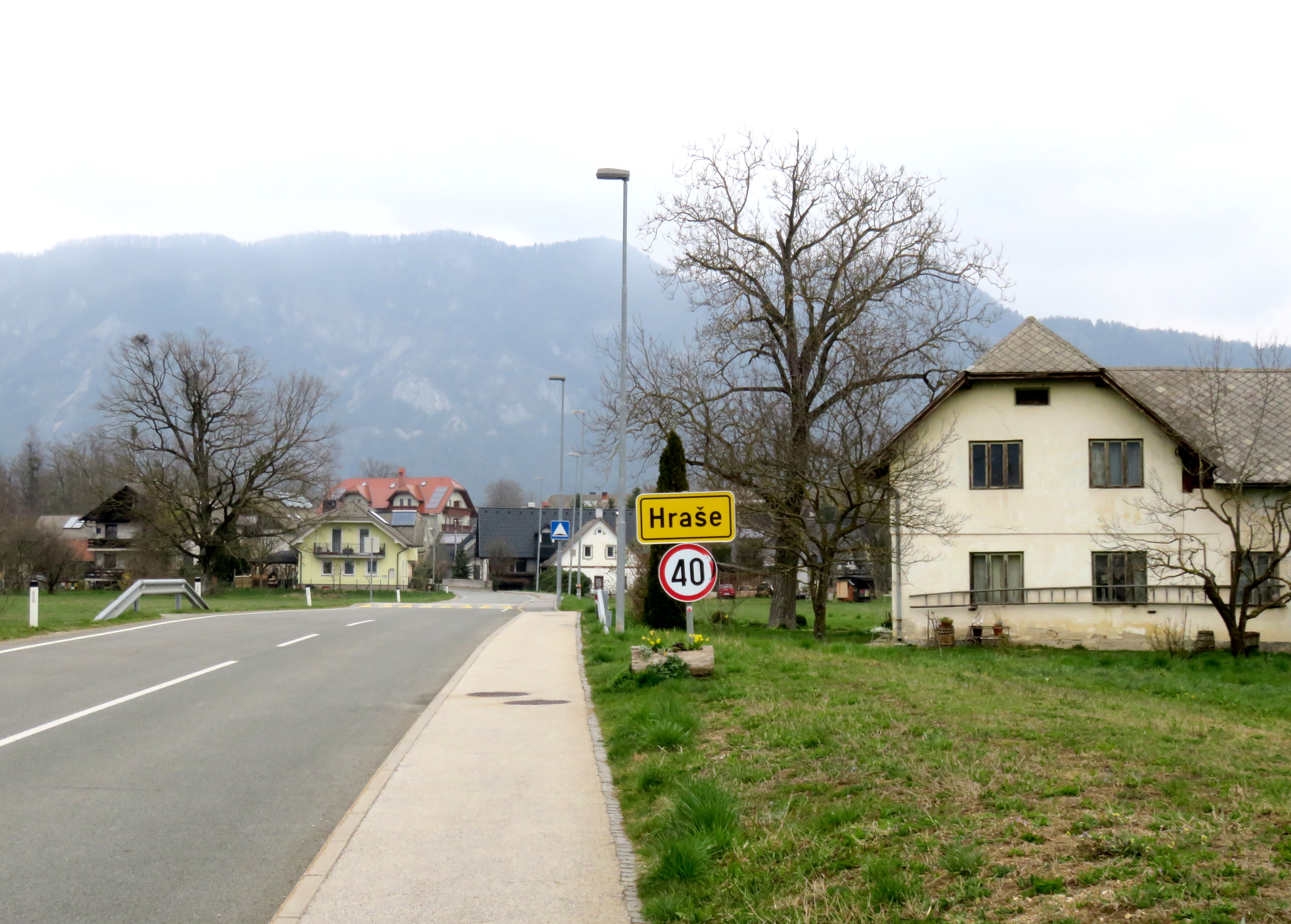

- Location in Slovenia
- Coordinates: 46°22′13.21″N 14°10′2.52″E
- Country: Slovenia
- Traditional region: Upper Carniola
- Statistical region: Upper Carniola
- Municipality: Radovljica
- Elevation: 518.7 m (1,702 ft)

Population (2002)
  - Total: 181

Hraše (pronounced [ˈxɾaːʃɛ]) is a settlement in the Municipality of Radovljica in the Upper Carniola region of Slovenia.
