= Brezovica, Radovljica =

Brezovica
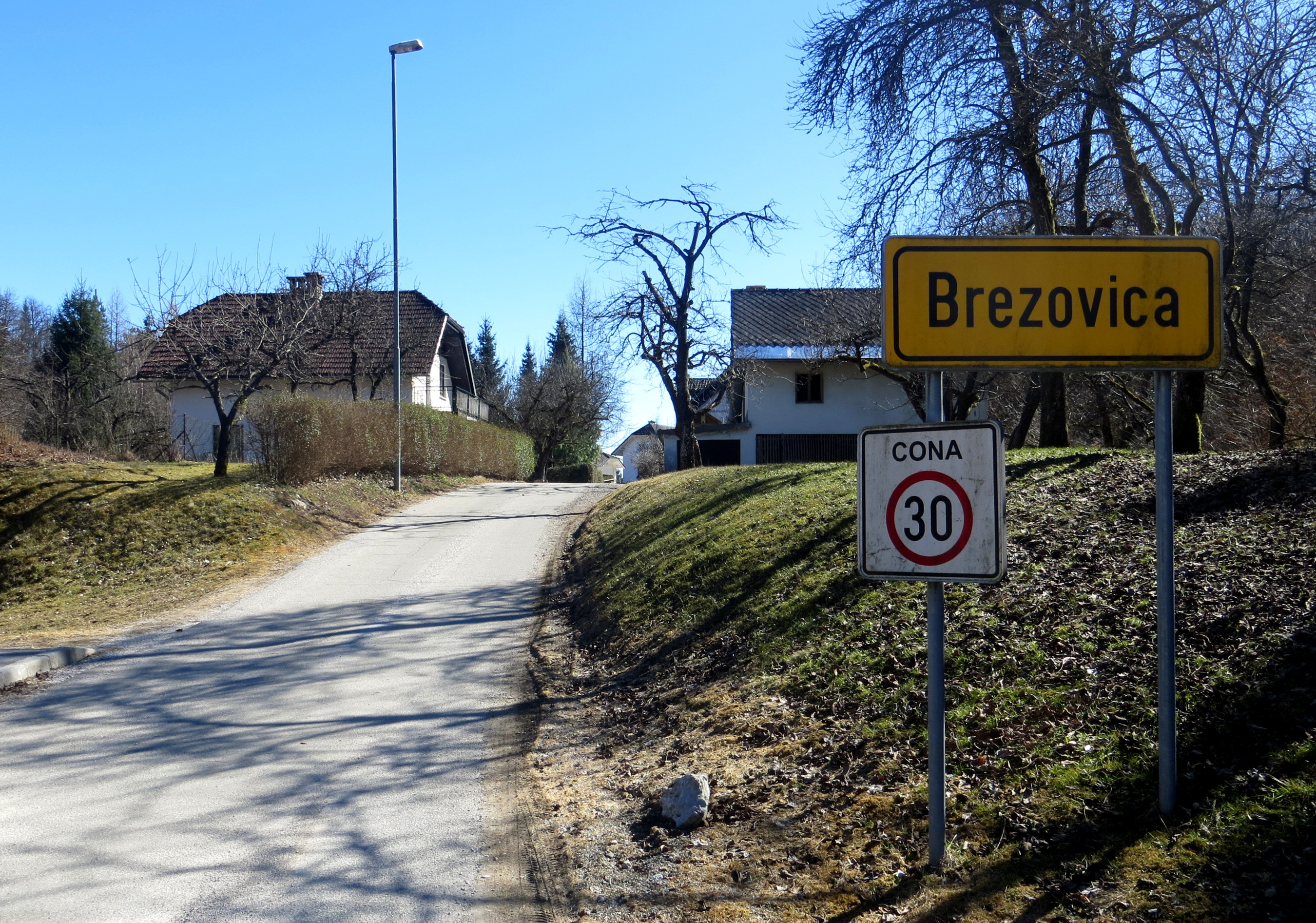

- Location in Slovenia
- Coordinates: 46°18′10.88″N 14°12′39.96″E
- Country: Slovenia
- Traditional region: Upper Carniola
- Statistical region: Upper Carniola
- Municipality: Radovljica
- Elevation: 463.1 m (1,519 ft)

Population (2002)
  - Total: 139

Brezovica (pronounced [ˈbɾéːzɔʋitsa]) is a settlement in the Municipality of Radovljica in the Upper Carniola region of Slovenia.
