= Rovte, Radovljica =

Rovte
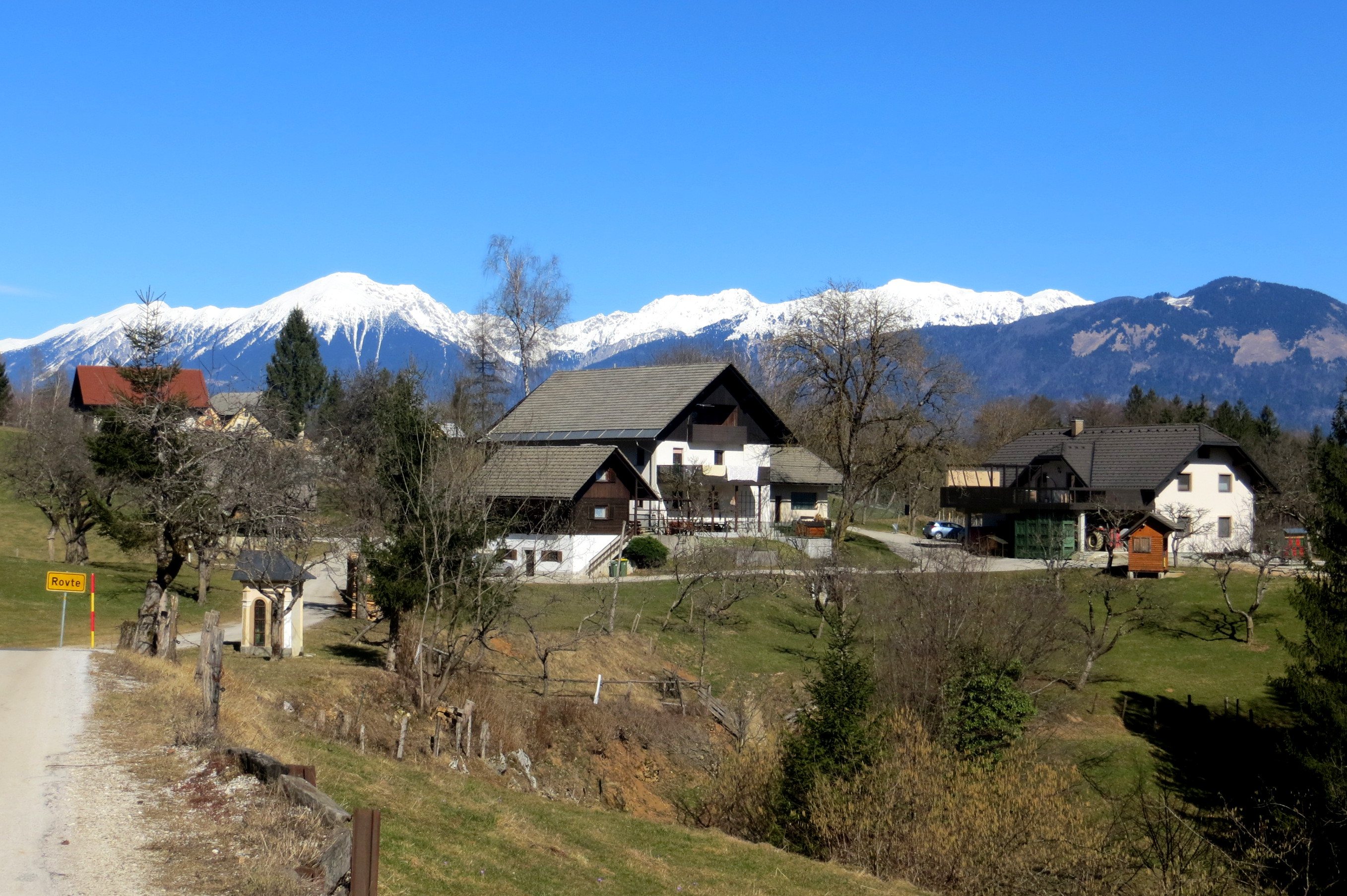

- Location in Slovenia
- Coordinates: 46°16′46.97″N 14°14′13.19″E
- Country: Slovenia
- Region: Upper Carniola
- Statistical region: Upper Carniola
- Municipality: Radovljica
- Elevation: 485.5 m (1,593 ft)

Population (2002)
  - Total: 58

Rovte (pronounced [ˈɾou̯ːtɛ]; in older sources also Rovte pri Nemiljah, German: Route bei Nemile) is a small settlement in the Municipality of Radovljica in the Upper Carniola region of Slovenia.
