= Dobro Polje, Radovljica =

Dobro Polje
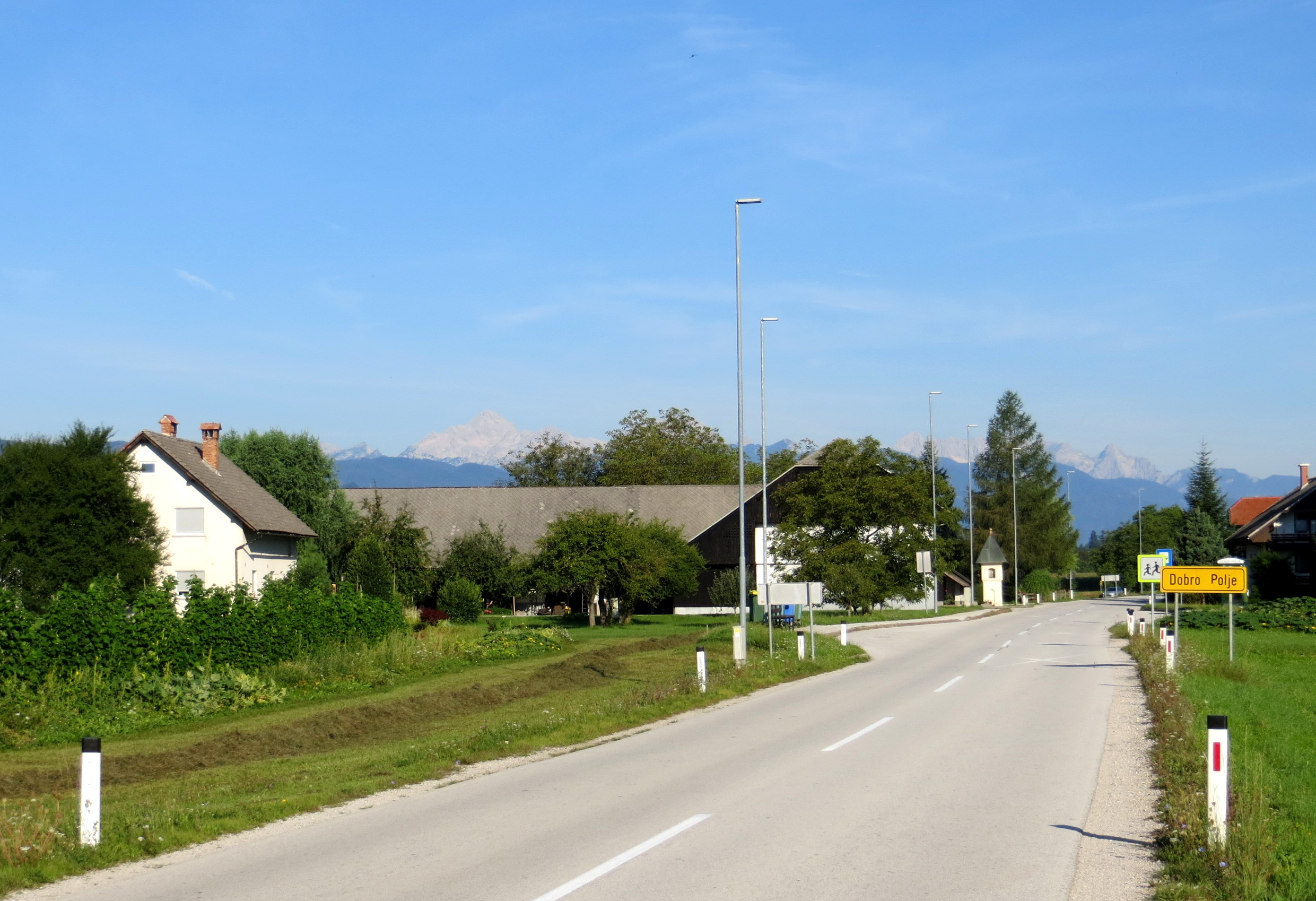

- Location in Slovenia
- Coordinates: 46°19′23.09″N 14°13′24.27″E
- Country: Slovenia
- Traditional region: Upper Carniola
- Statistical region: Upper Carniola
- Municipality: Radovljica
- Elevation: 463.1 m (1,519 ft)

Population (2002)
  - Total: 119

Dobro Polje (pronounced [ˈdɔːbɾɔ ˈpoːljɛ], German: Gutenfeld) is a settlement on the left bank of the Sava River in the Municipality of Radovljica in the Upper Carniola region of Slovenia.

== Geography ==
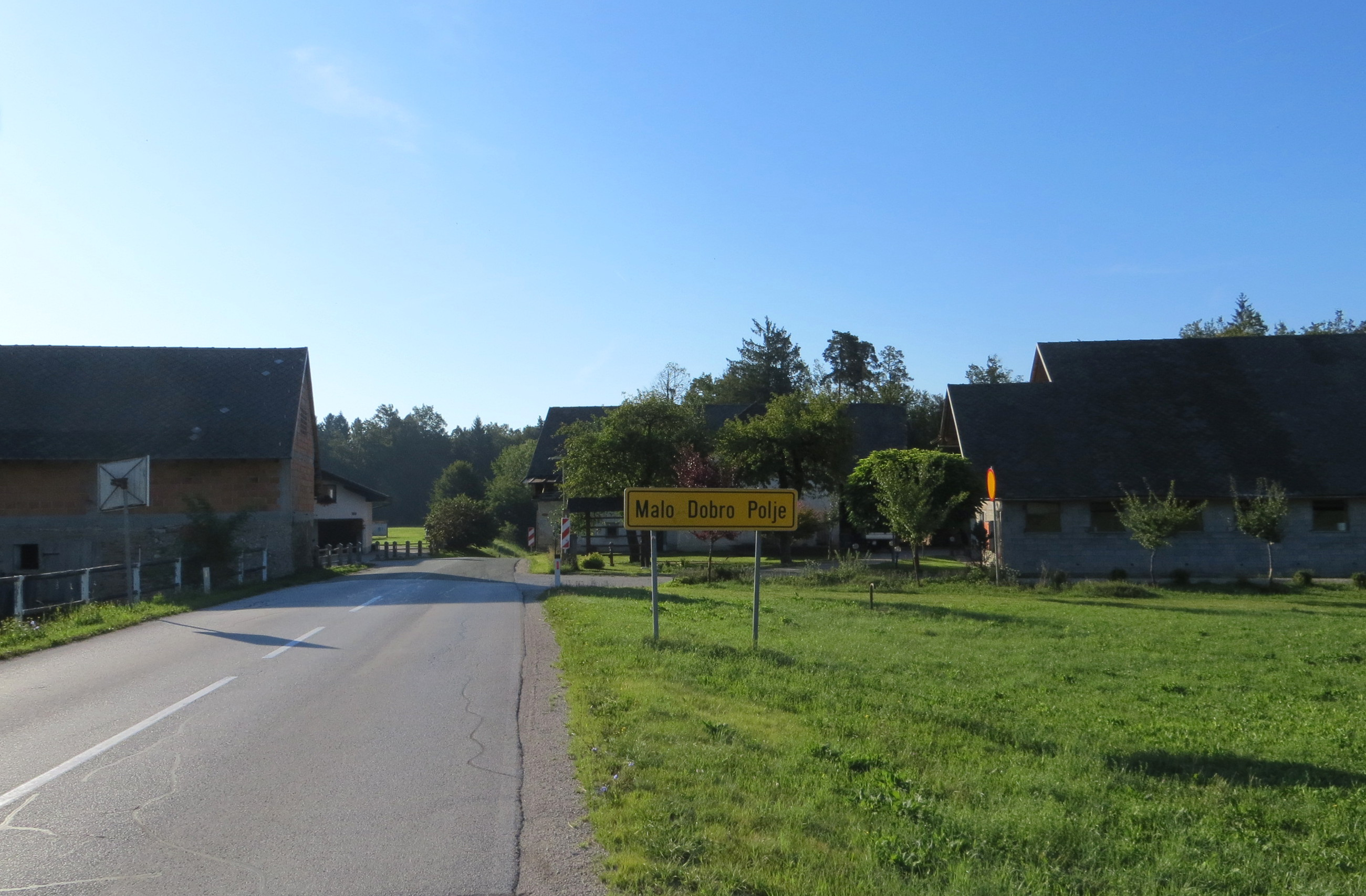
Malo Dobro Polje

Dobro Polje is divided into the hamlet of Malo Dobro Polje (literally, 'little Dobro Polje'; German: Kleingutenfeld) to the southeast and the main settlement of Veliko Dobro Polje (literally, 'big Dobro Polje'; German: Großgutenfeld) to the northwest. It is located in the lower part of the Brezje Basin. The soil is thin and sandy, limiting agriculture. Peračica Creek, a tributary of the Sava River, flows through a deep bed east of the village.
