= Hlebce =

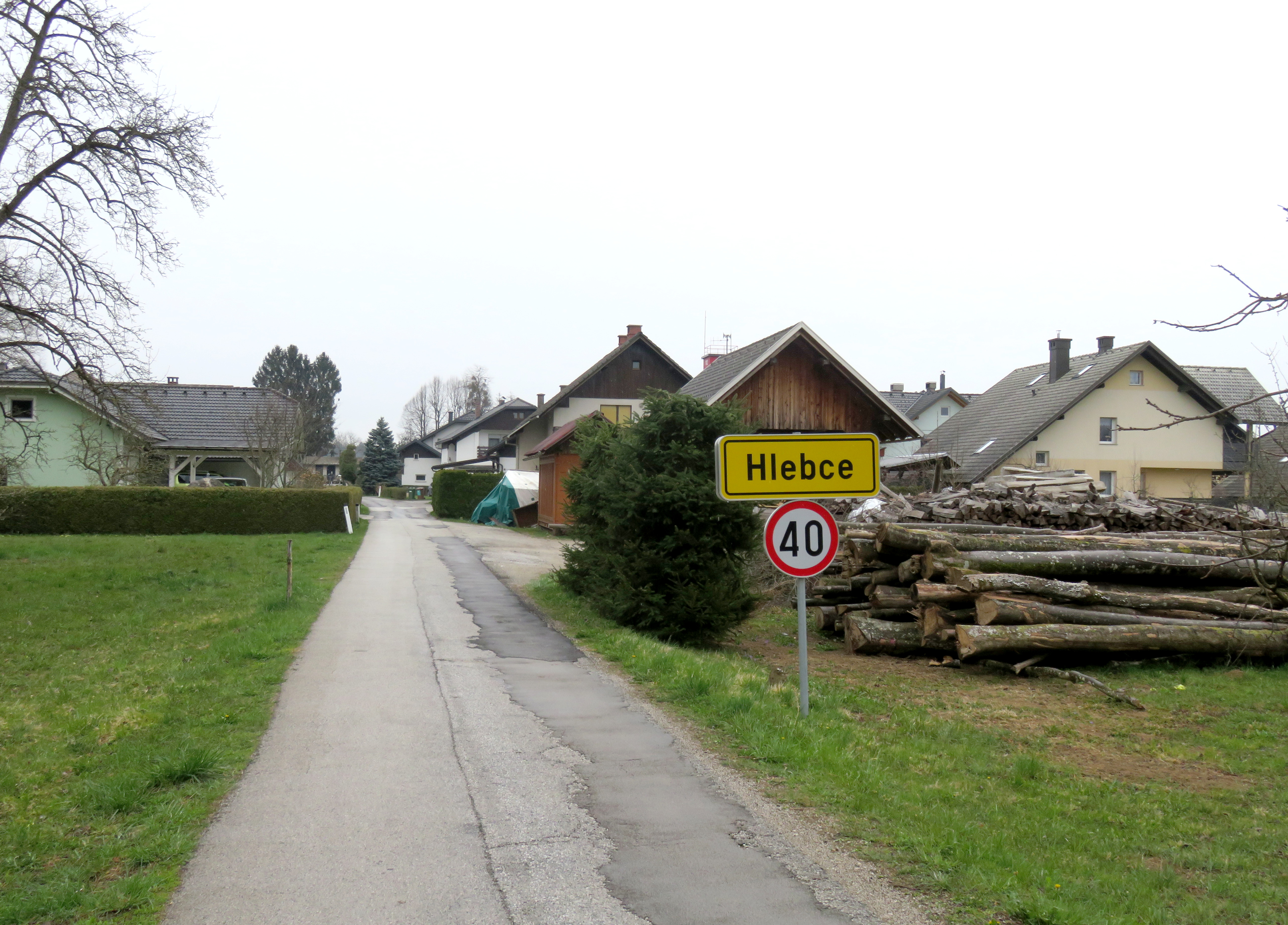

- Location in Slovenia
- Coordinates: 46°21′59.4″N 14°10′45.32″E
- Country: Slovenia
- Traditional region: Upper Carniola
- Statistical region: Upper Carniola
- Municipality: Radovljica
- Elevation: 521.7 m (1,712 ft)

Population (2002)
  - Total: 217

Hlebce (pronounced [ˈxleːptsɛ]) is a village in the Municipality of Radovljica in the Upper Carniola region of Slovenia.

== Name ==
Hlebce was attested in historical sources in 1338 as Chlepz (and as Chlebts in 1359 and Chlebcz in 1416). The name is probably an old locative form derived from Slavic *chlębь 'dell, shaft, chasm', referring to a local geographical feature.

== History ==
A number of buildings several centuries old stand in Hlebce; they are the remnant of a manor farm that belonged to Katzenstein Castle in Begunje na Gorenjskem. There was extensive new construction in the village and population growth after the Second World War. Graben Creek flowed from the Krpina Valley through Hlebce until 1956, when it was rerouted into Begunje na Gorenjskem due to drainage work and made a tributary of Zgoša Creek.

=== Mass graves ===
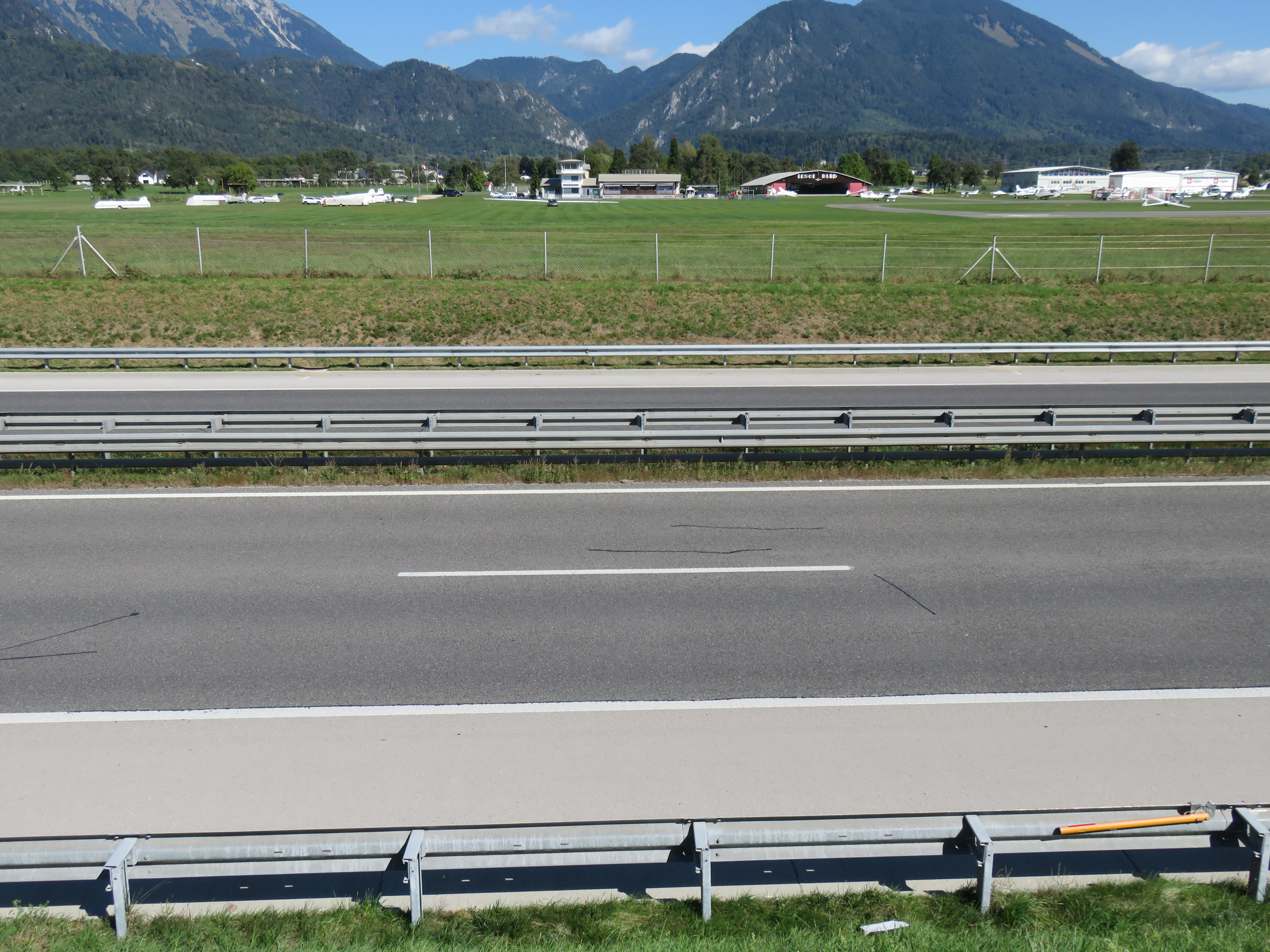
Site of the Lesce 1 and 2 Mass Graves

Hlebce is the site of two known mass graves from the period immediately after the Second World War. Both are located near the freeway southeast of the settlement and contain the remains of Russian Liberation Army soldiers murdered in mid-May 1945 by members of the 29th Herzegovinian Division. The graves were excavated in late 2006 during freeway construction. The Lesce 1 Mass Grave (Slovene: Grobišče Lesce 1) lies in an area covering 6 by 2.7 meters (19.7 by 8.9 ft) and yielded the remains of at least 33 victims. The Lesce 2 Mass Grave (Grobišče Lesce 2) is located about 14 meters (46 ft) from the first site. It lies in an area covering 2 by 1.5 meters (6 ft 7 in by 4 ft 11 in) and yielded the remains of three victims. The grave site is unmarked and is partially covered by the freeway lanes.

== Cultural heritage ==
A number of structures in Hlebce have been registered as cultural heritage:

- A one-story stone farmhouse with a partial semi-cellar stands in the southern part of the village at Hlebce no. 12, south of the road to Lesce. It has a gabled roof covered with flat concrete tiles, a wooden attic, and an enclosed balcony along the gable. The tuff door casing has a semicircular top with the year 1777 carved into it. Part of the house has stone window casings.
- A two-story farmhouse with a gabled roof, a stone door casing with a semicircular top, and a two-light window above the entrance stands at Hlebce no. 15 in the center of the village, west of the Second World War monument and northeast of the fire station. There is a vaulted vestibule on the upper floor. The house dates from the 18th and 19th centuries, but was remodeled in the late 20th and early 21st centuries, when new elements were added to it.
- A stone chapel-shrine stands north of the road from to Lesce, west of the village. It is square with a hip roof and a groin-vaulted niche containing a painting of the Virgin Mary with an angel. The shrine is decorated with frescoes, has a wrought-iron gate, and dates from the late 18th or early 19th century.
- A crucifix stands in the middle of the village, north of the intersection with the road to Lesce and south of the house at Hlebce no. 20. It consists of a wooden cross and a wooden polychrome figure from the late 19th or early 20th century.
- A crucifix stands along the road in the southwest part of the village, at Hlebce no. 40. It consists of a wooden cross and a cast-iron figure from a gravestone, and dates from the late 19th or early 20th century.
- In the middle of the village there is a monument to nine villagers that lost their lives in the Second World War. It is a marble obelisk that was erected in 1946.
