= Lancovo =

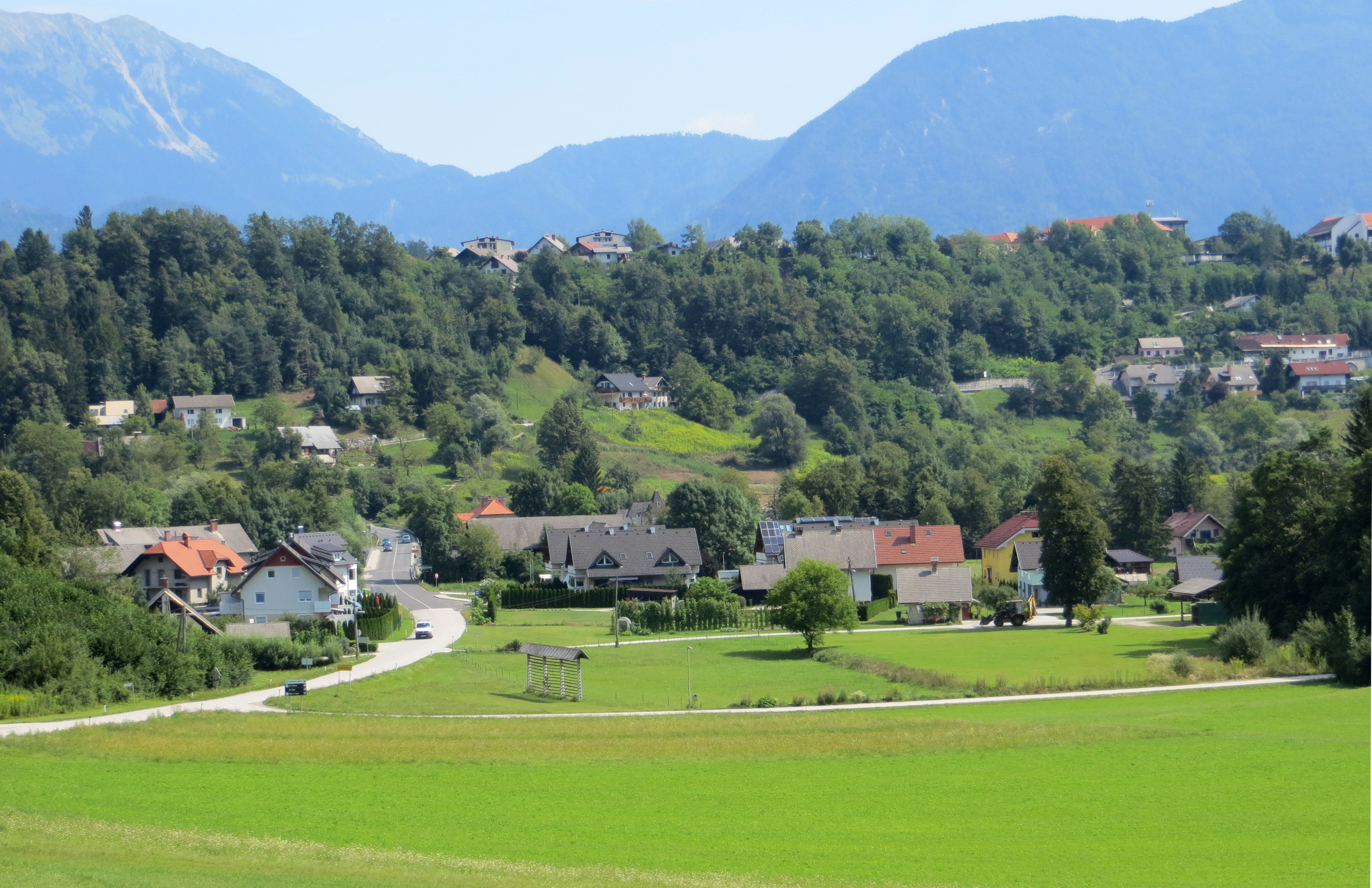

- Location in Slovenia
- Coordinates: 46°19′58.08″N 14°9′36.06″E
- Country: Slovenia
- Traditional region: Upper Carniola
- Statistical region: Upper Carniola
- Municipality: Radovljica
- Elevation: 387 m (1,270 ft)

Population (2022)
  - Total: 536

Lancovo (pronounced [ˈlaːntsɔʋɔ]) is a settlement on the right bank of the Sava River, opposite Radovljica in the Upper Carniola region of Slovenia.

== Name ==
Lancovo was attested in written sources as Lanczawe in 1295, Lanzaw in 1326, and Sannd Lamprecht and Lanndtsach in 1498, among other variations.

== Church ==
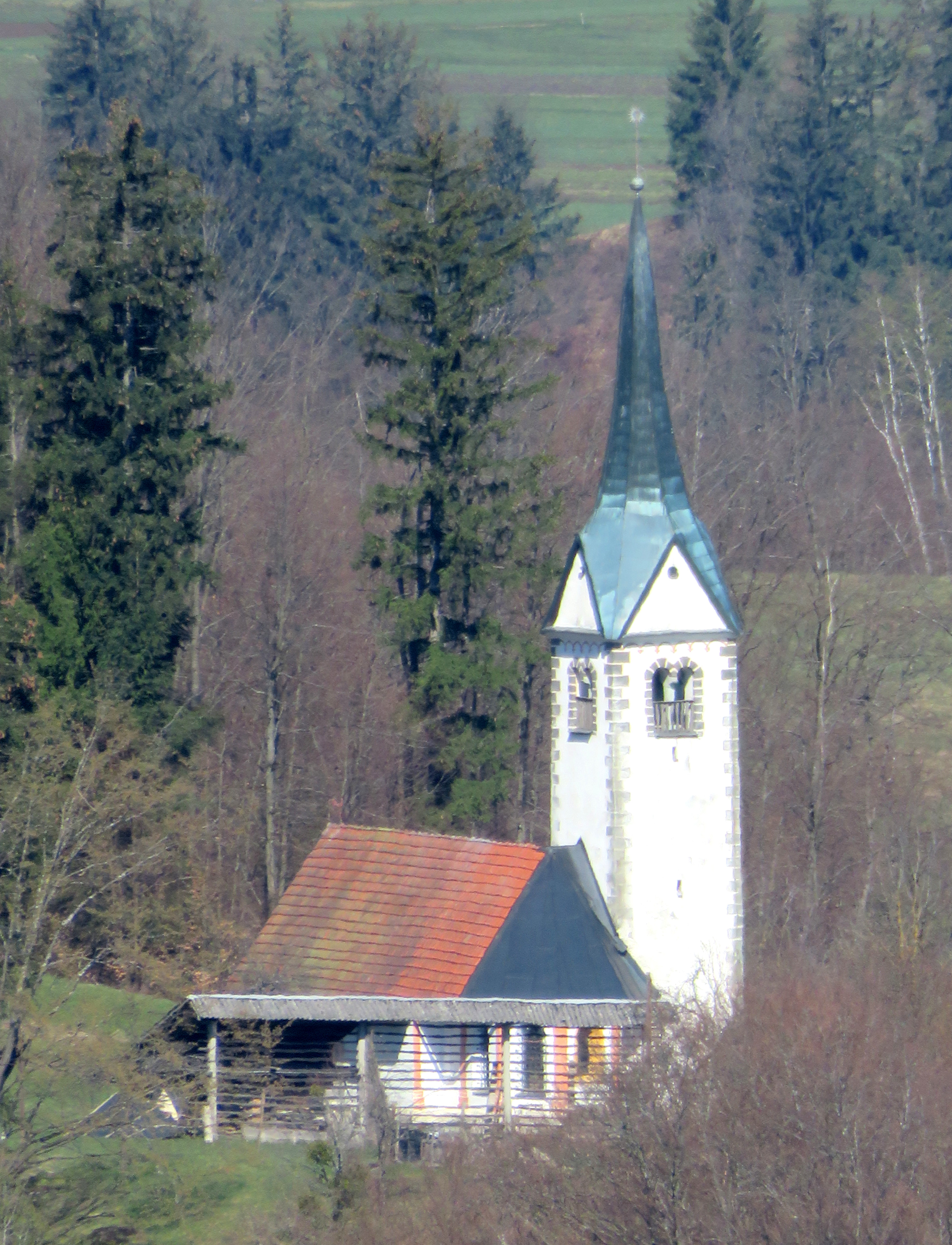
Saint Lambert's Church

There is a church in Lancovo dedicated to St. Lambert. It was originally built in the first half of the 16th century, from which the chancel with ribbed vaulting and late Gothic frescoes remain. The nave was later remodeled in the Baroque style.
