= Vrbnje =

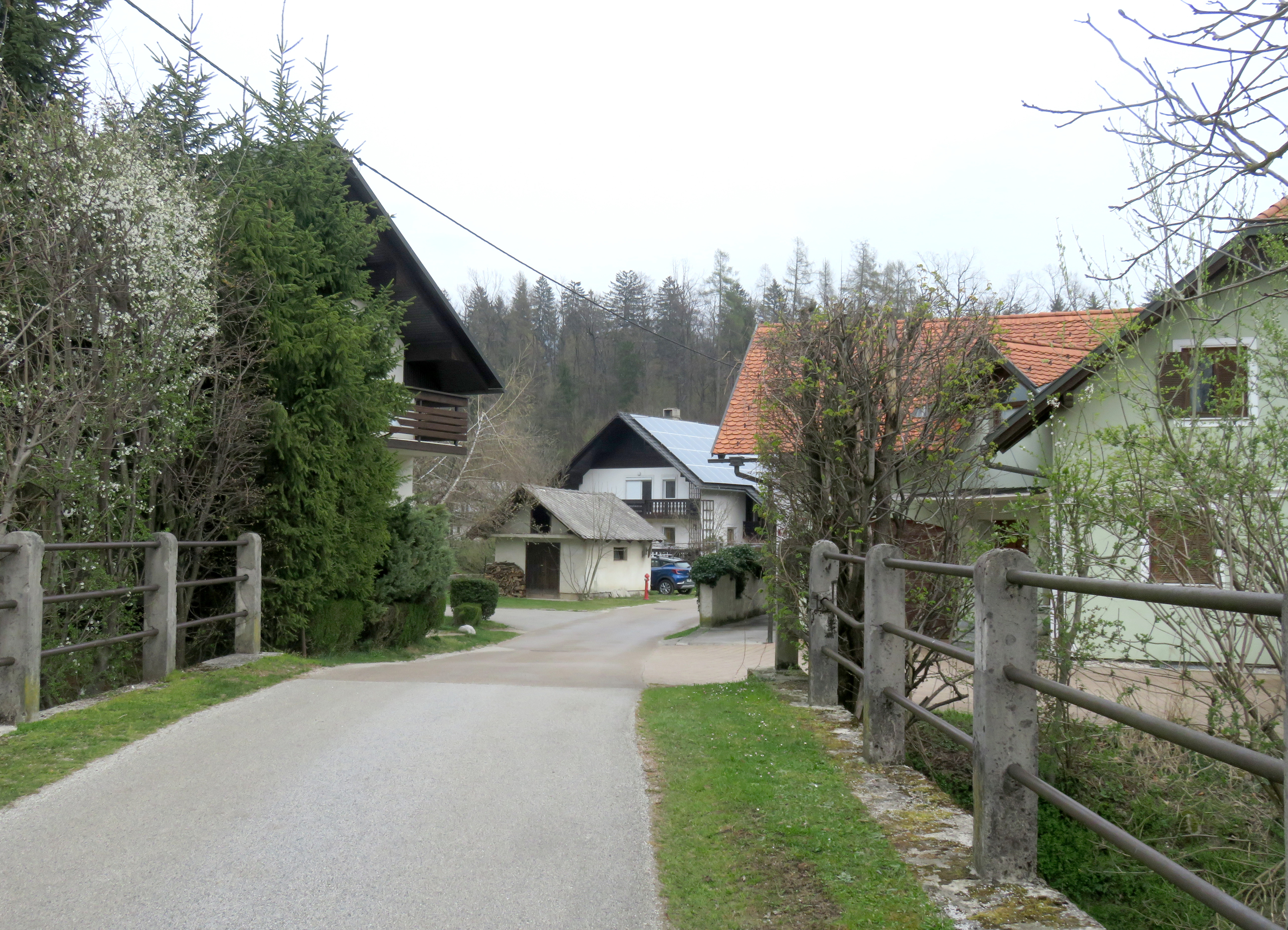

- Location in Slovenia
- Coordinates: 46°21′6.44″N 14°11′26.67″E
- Country: Slovenia
- Region: Upper Carniola
- Statistical region: Upper Carniola
- Municipality: Radovljica
- Elevation: 508.4 m (1,668 ft)

Population (2002)
  - Total: 336

Vrbnje (pronounced [ˈʋəɾbnjɛ], German: Werbnach) is a settlement in the Municipality of Radovljica in the Upper Carniola region of Slovenia.
