= Noše =

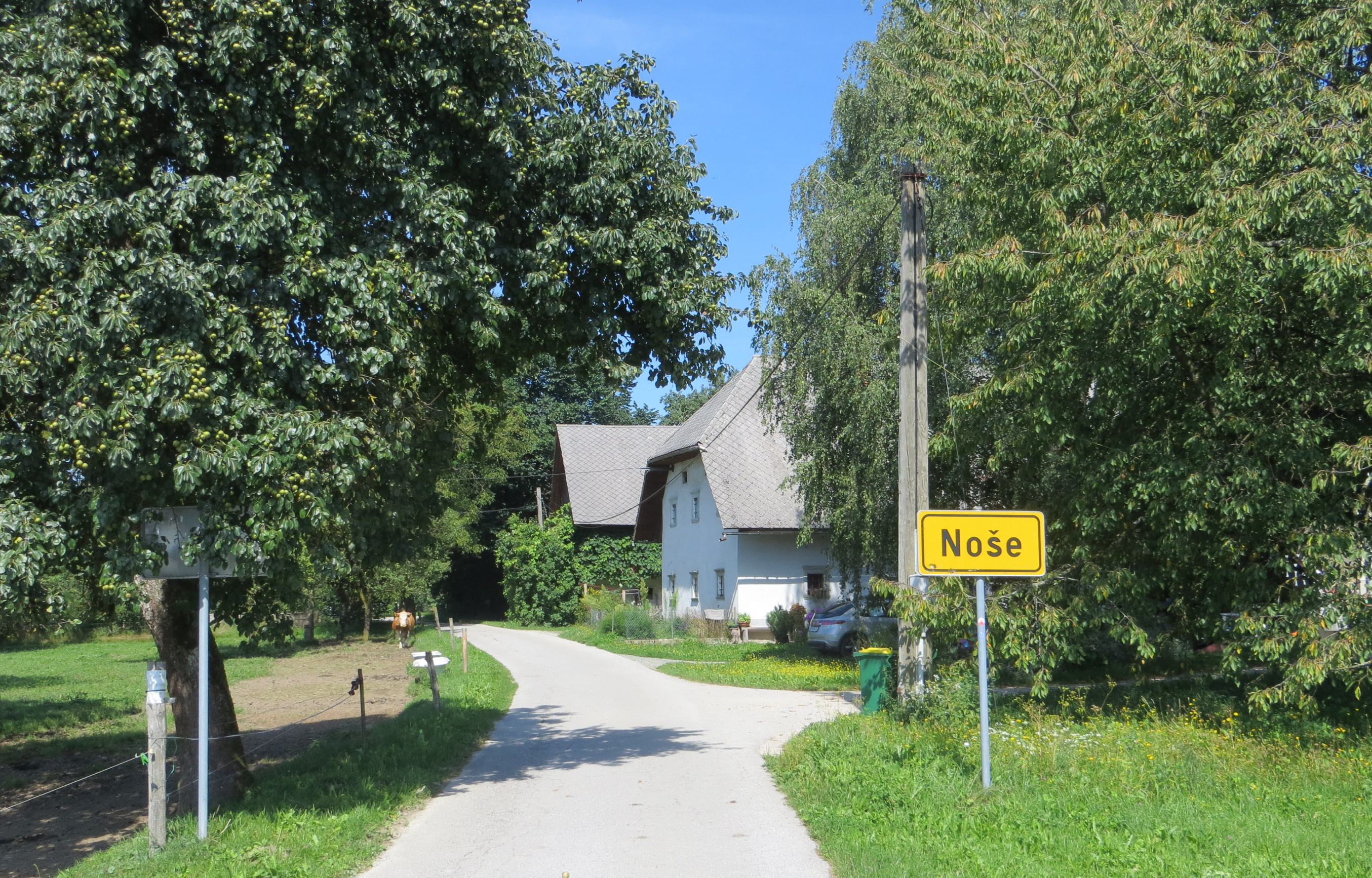

- Location in Slovenia
- Coordinates: 46°19′58.22″N 14°13′46.22″E
- Country: Slovenia
- Traditional region: Upper Carniola
- Statistical region: Upper Carniola
- Municipality: Radovljica
- Elevation: 491.7 m (1,613 ft)

Population (2002)
  - Total: 12

Noše (pronounced [ˈnoːʃɛ], German: Noschach) is a small settlement near Brezje in the Municipality of Radovljica in the Upper Carniola region of Slovenia.
