= Gorica, Radovljica =

Gorica
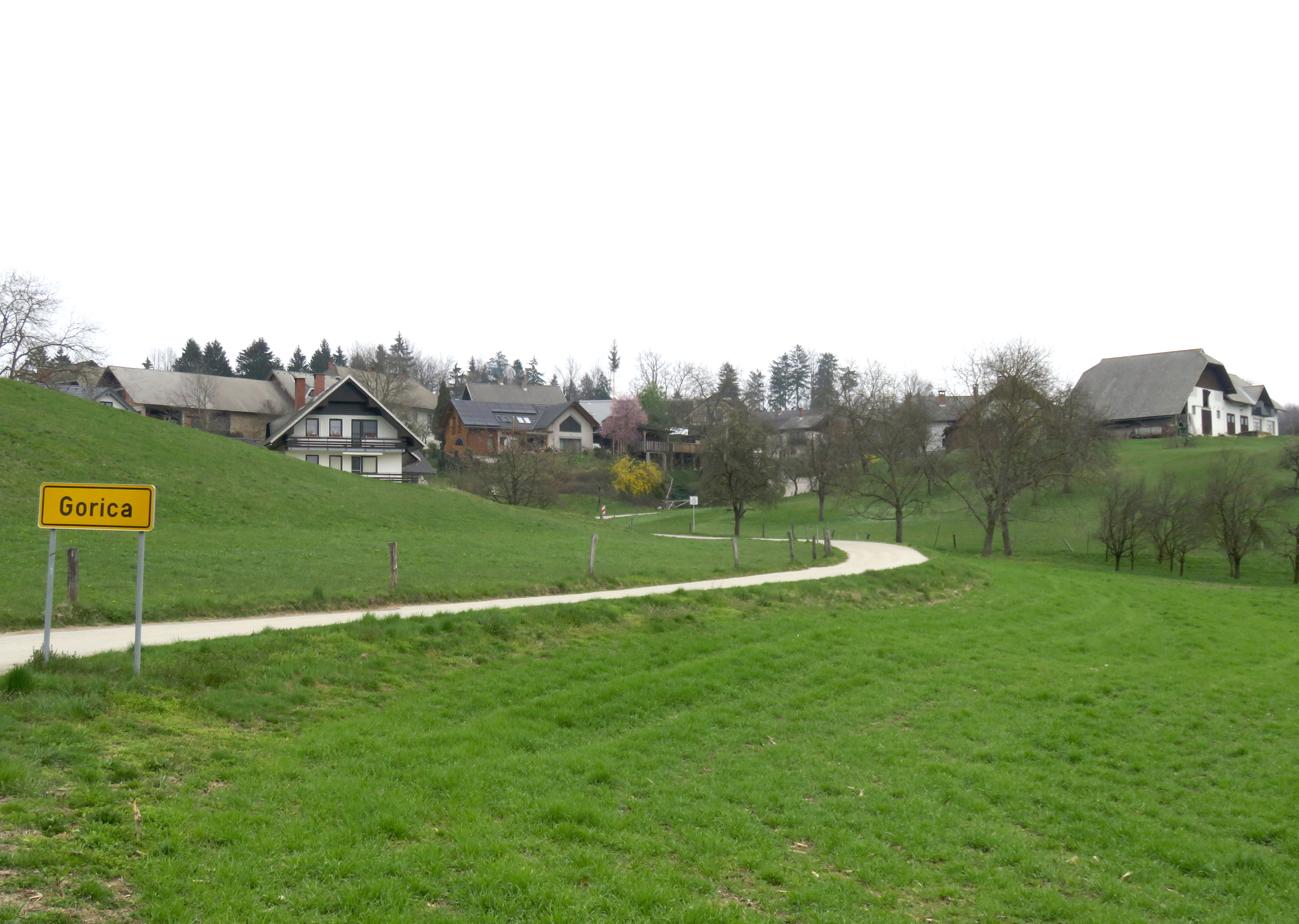

- Location in Slovenia
- Coordinates: 46°20′44.41″N 14°11′52.85″E
- Country: Slovenia
- Traditional region: Upper Carniola
- Statistical region: Upper Carniola
- Municipality: Radovljica
- Elevation: 521.4 m (1,711 ft)

Population (2002)
  - Total: 91

Gorica (pronounced [ɡɔˈɾiːtsa]) is a settlement in the Municipality of Radovljica in the Upper Carniola region of Slovenia.
