= Prezrenje =

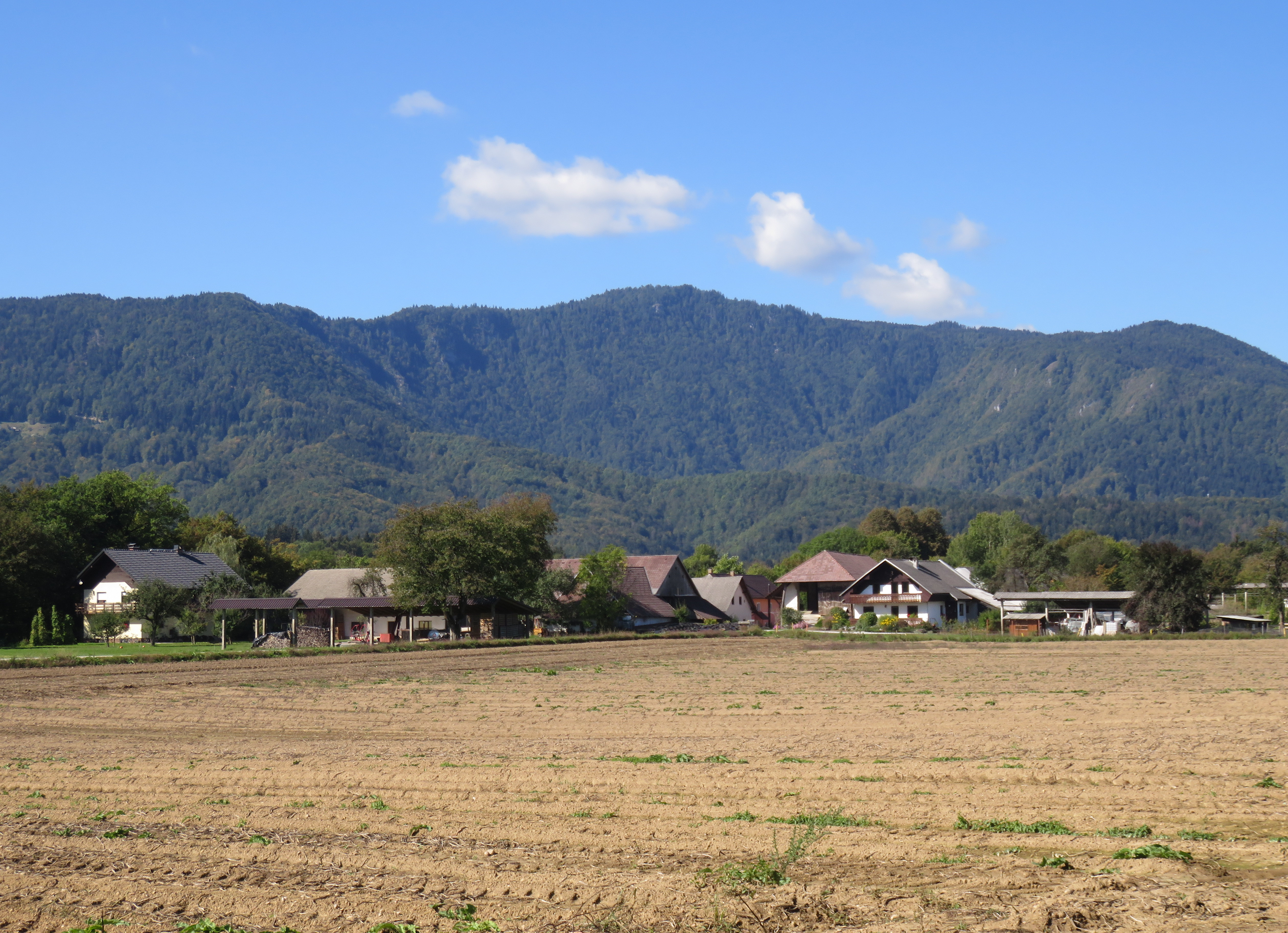

- Location in Slovenia
- Coordinates: 46°17′38.7″N 14°14′47.52″E
- Country: Slovenia
- Region: Upper Carniola
- Statistical region: Upper Carniola
- Municipality: Radovljica
- Elevation: 463.5 m (1,521 ft)

Population (2002)
  - Total: 77

Prezrenje (pronounced [pɾɛˈzɾeːnjɛ]) is a settlement in the Municipality of Radovljica in the Upper Carniola region of Slovenia.
