= Zaloše =

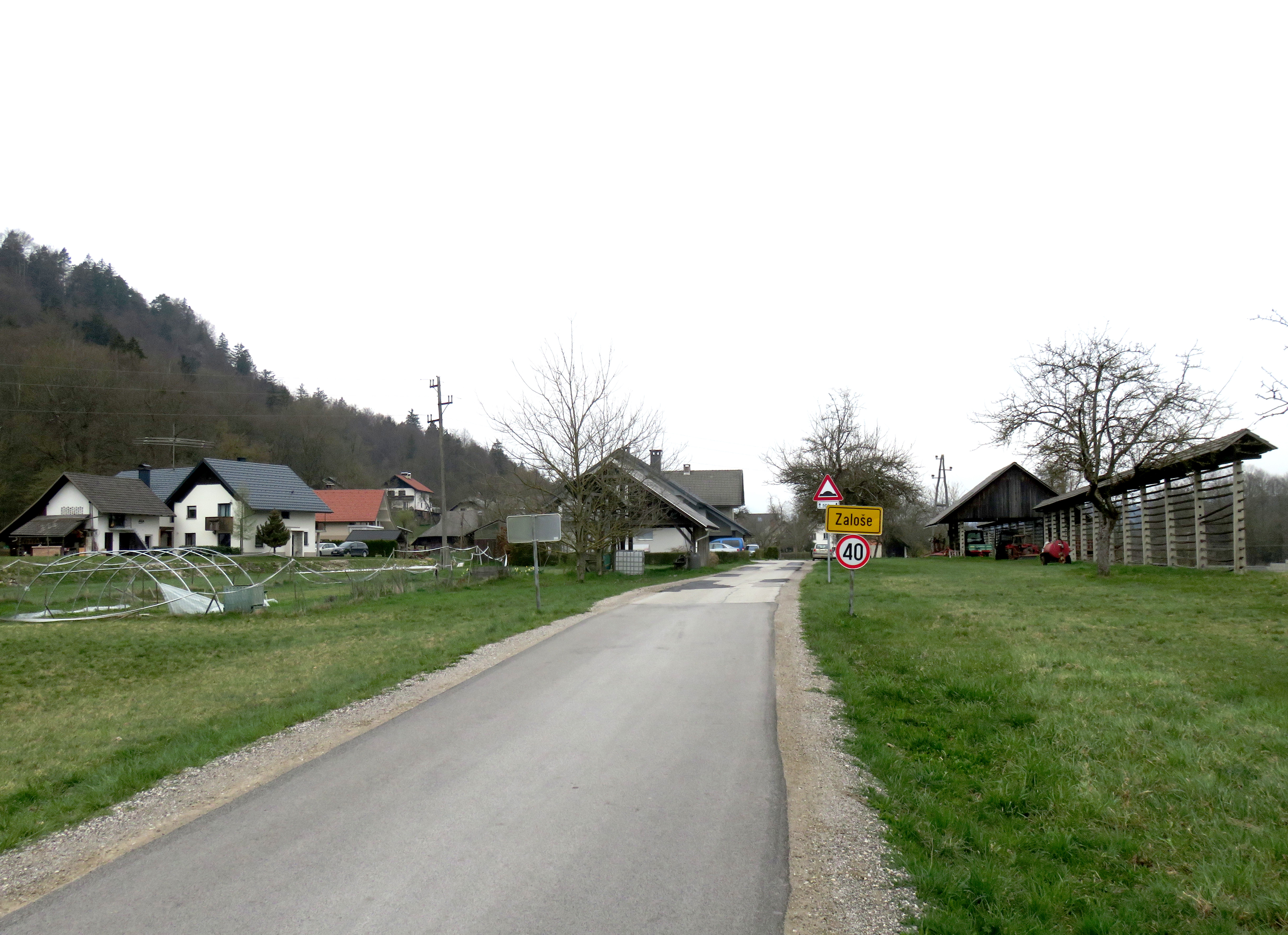

- Location in Slovenia
- Coordinates: 46°18′15.62″N 14°14′46.08″E
- Country: Slovenia
- Region: Upper Carniola
- Statistical region: Upper Carniola
- Municipality: Radovljica
- Elevation: 388.9 m (1,276 ft)

Population (2002)
  - Total: 90

Zaloše (pronounced [ˈzaːlɔʃɛ]) is a settlement on the right bank of the Sava River in the Municipality of Radovljica in the Upper Carniola region of Slovenia.
