= Otoče =

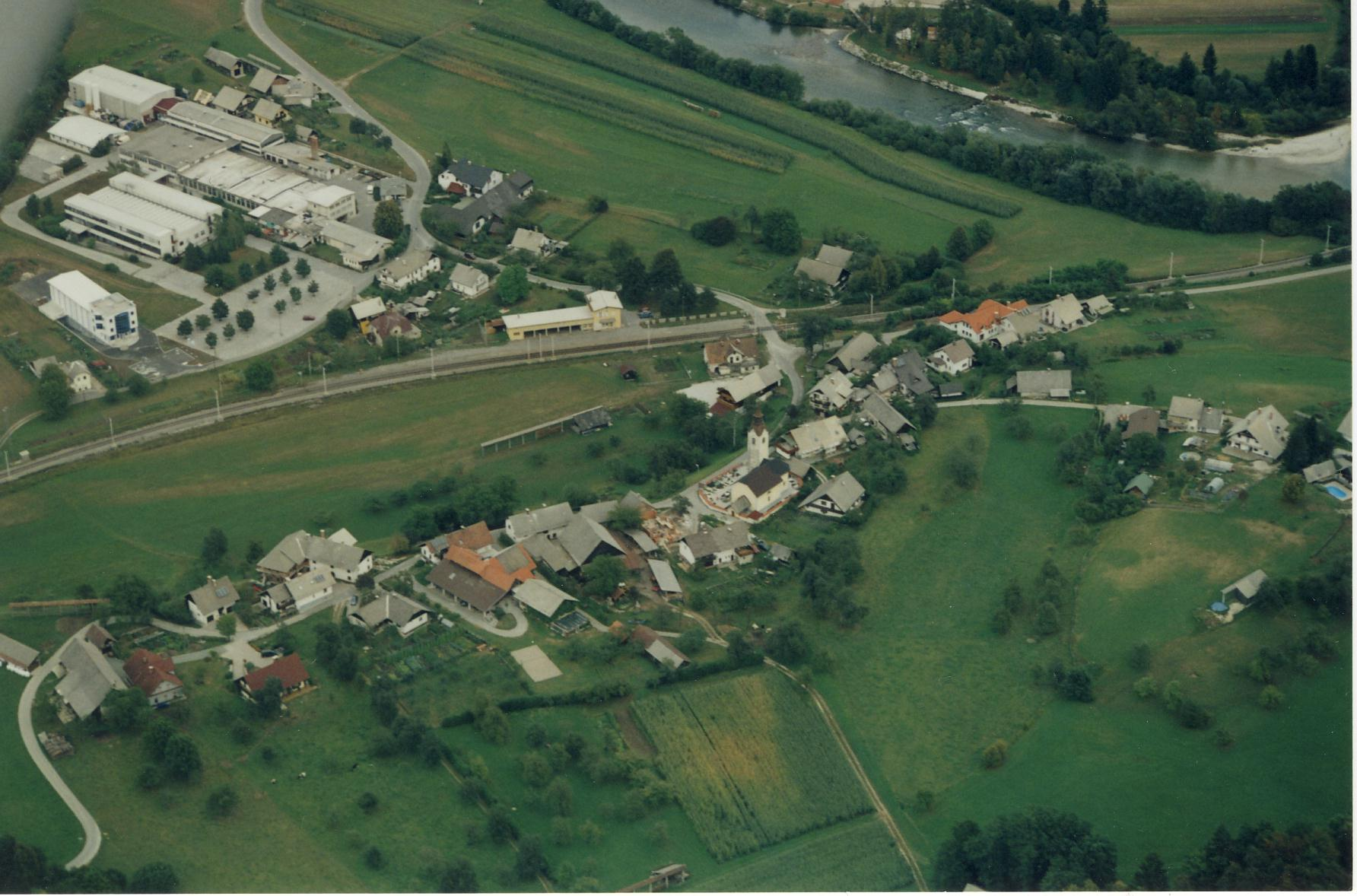

- Location in Slovenia
- Coordinates: 46°18′36.98″N 14°13′54.84″E
- Country: Slovenia
- Region: Upper Carniola
- Statistical region: Upper Carniola
- Municipality: Radovljica
- Elevation: 399.3 m (1,310 ft)

Population (2002)
  - Total: 159

Otoče (pronounced [ɔˈtoːtʃɛ]) is a village on the Sava River in the Municipality of Radovljica in the Upper Carniola region of Slovenia.

== Church ==
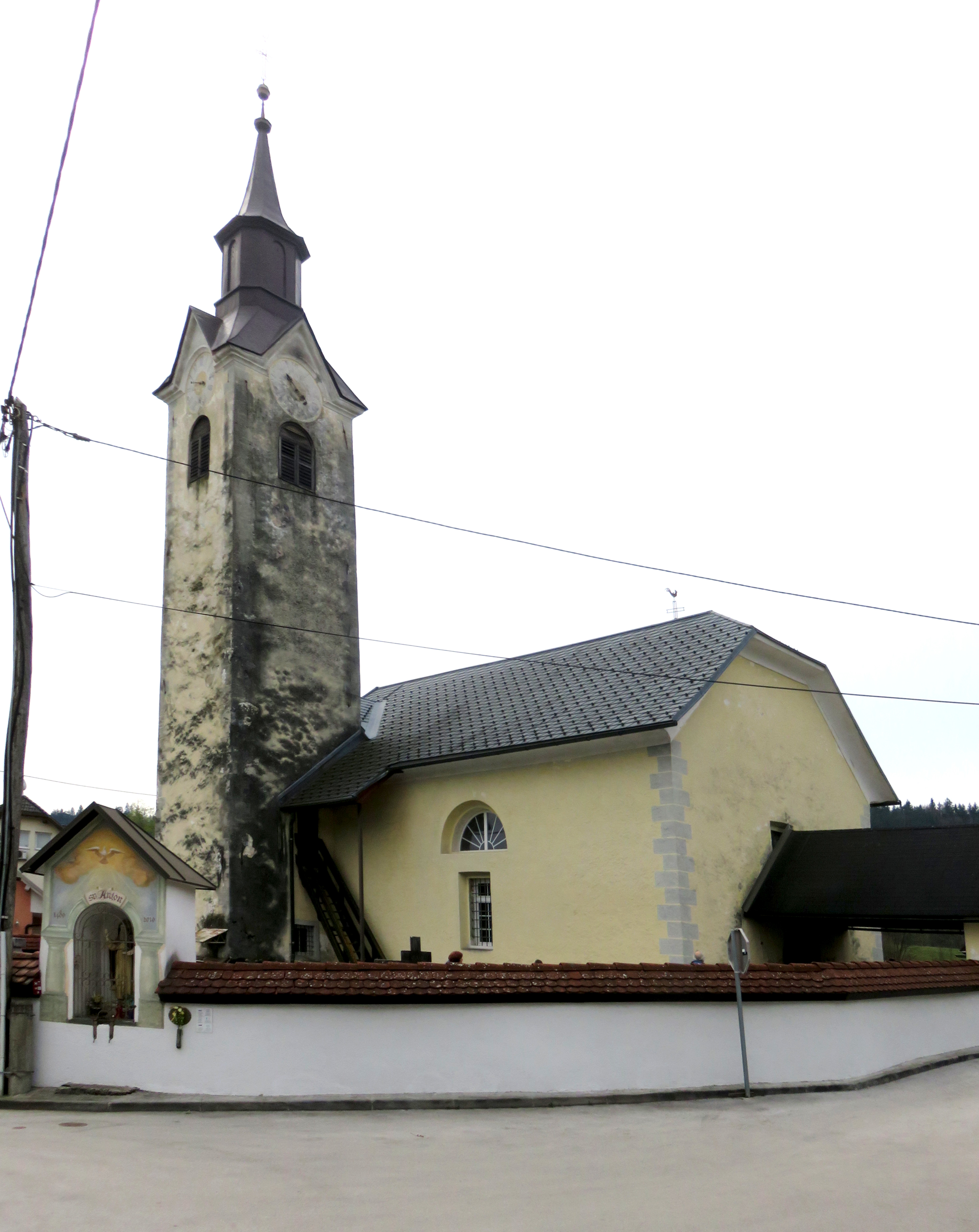
Saint Anthony the Great Church

The church in Otoče is dedicated to Saint Anthony the Great. It is originally a Gothic church that was remodeled in the Baroque style. The year 1480 is carved above the entrance, in front of which there is a Renaissance portico with an atrium.
