= Battle of Dražgoše =

1942 Nazi battle with Partisans in Slovenia

Battle of Dražgoše dražgoška bitka
- Part of World War II in the Slovene Lands
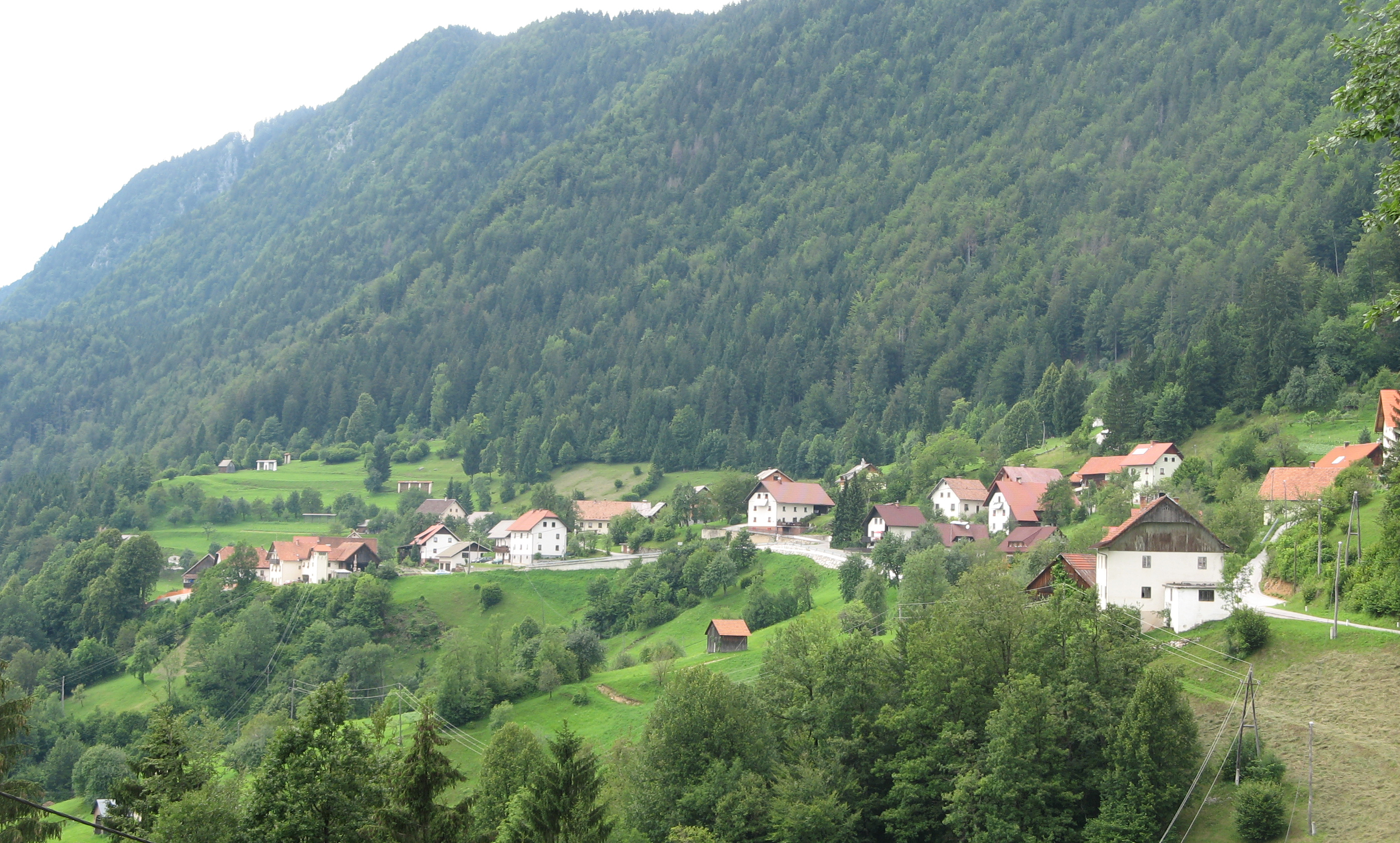
- The village of Dražgoše below the Jelovica Plateau
Date	January 9–11, 1942
Location	Dražgoše, Nazi Germany (present-day Slovenia) 46°15′7.61″N 14°10′38″E
Result	Partisans retreated on the third day, Germans razed Dražgoše and imprisoned or killed its inhabitants in revenge

Belligerents
Slovene Partisans	Germany

Commanders and leaders
Jože Gregorčič	Willi Hertlein

Strength
200 fighters	4,000 policemen and soldiers

Casualties and losses
9 killed in action 11 wounded	27 killed in action 42 wounded
- 41 hostages shot 81 villagers interned
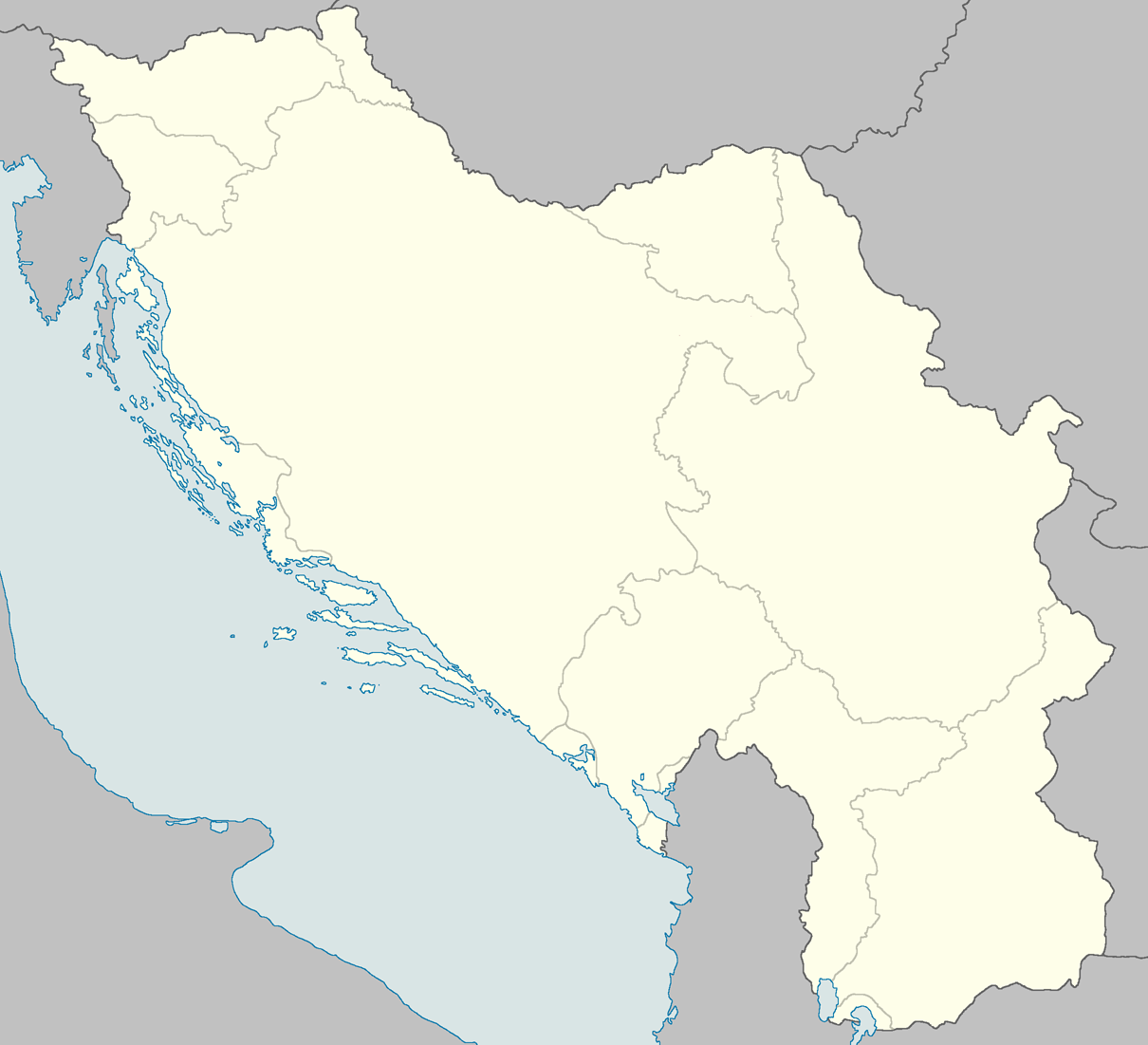
- Location in annexed and occupied Yugoslavia

The Battle of Dražgoše (Slovene: dražgoška bitka) was a Second World War battle between the Slovene Partisans and Nazi Germany armed forces, which took place between January 9 and January 11, 1942, in the village of Dražgoše in German-occupied Slovenia. This battle was the first direct confrontation between the two. It ended with brutal reprisals of German forces against the villagers and the destruction of the village.

== Background ==
Following the occupation of Slovenia, Germany planned to annex Upper Carniola, where Dražgoše is located, to the Reich, and Germanize the local population. The Germans expelled nearly all Slovene priests from the region, as well as teachers and other intellectuals, forbade the use of Slovene language in schools and churches, imported German-speaking teachers into Upper Carniola, while drafting local Slovenes into forced labor in the Reich. This soon generated resistance, with initially smaller scale actions, but the halting of the German Army before Moscow led to hopes the war would soon end, prompting the Slovene Liberation Front to start a wider uprising in Upper Carniola.

The main Partisan unit in Upper Carniola was the Cankar Battalion, founded in August 1941, which had already carried out a number of actions against the Germans, including an unsuccessful attempt to free prisoners from the Gestapo headquarters at Begunje. On December 12, 1941, the Cankar Battalion encountered a unit of German armed police near Rovte v Selški Dolini, killing 45 of them, perhaps one of the largest such single-battle successes to date in all occupied Europe. This further emboldened Slovenes, with hundreds voluntarily joining the Cankar Battalion.

News of the uprising reached Himmler, who ordered additional armed police battalions to suppress the uprising, and the German authorities also shot 37 Slovene prisoners, mostly Partisans and Partisan supporters, at their Gestapo headquarters in Begunje na Gorenjskem. The Germans attacked the Cankar Battalion at Pasja Ravan, where the Partisans resisted for three days, killing dozens of armed police. Knowing the Germans were sending reinforcements, the Cankar Battalion decided to retreat from Pasja Ravan and, after discussing a number of alternatives, decided to retreat to Dražgoše.

== The battle ==
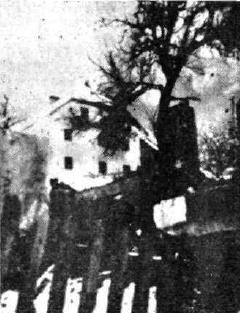
During the battle

For the attack on Dražgoše, the Germans gathered four battalions with more than 2,000 well-armed men, including heavy artillery and a spotter airplane, to attack some 200 Partisans of the Cankar Battalion. Over three days of battles, from January 9 to 11, the Germans suffered 69 casualties - 27 killed and 42 wounded - while the Partisans had 20 casualties - 9 killed and 11 wounded.

On January 11, the Germans, with the help of local Slovene collaborators, managed to enter the village. That evening, the exhausted Partisans were forced to leave the village, withdrawing to Mount Jelovica, and some Dražgoše residents joined them in the withdrawal.

The Partisans selected Dražgoše to challenge the German forces, and that villagers asked the Partisans forces to leave the village. Others note that going to Dražgoše was just one of multiple options considered by the Partisans, following their battles against the Germans at Rovte and Pasja Ravan, and point to the fact that when they arrived at the village, they permitted the locals to inform the Germans of their presence, so the village would not be held responsible and suffer reprisals.

== Aftermath ==
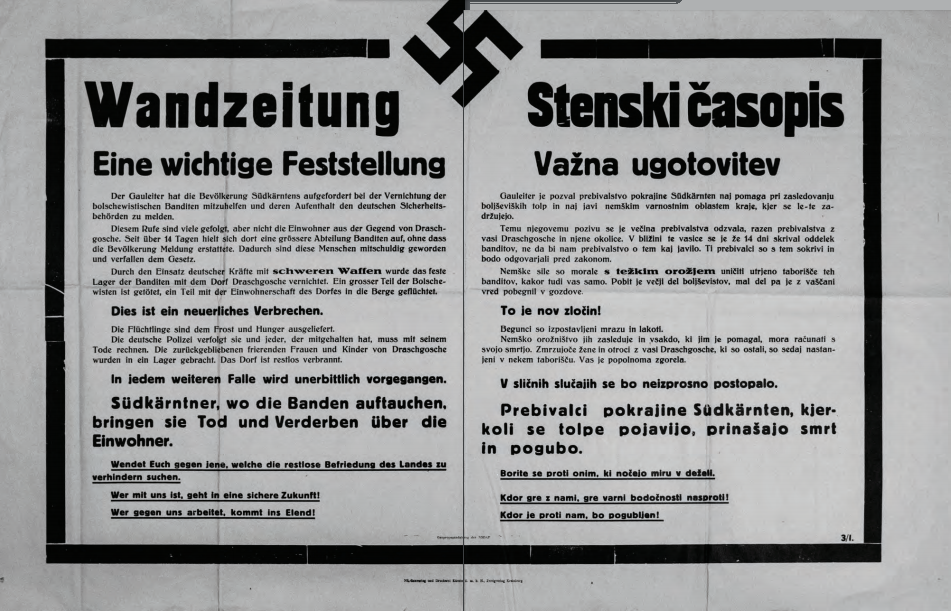
German poster announcing destruction of Dražgoše

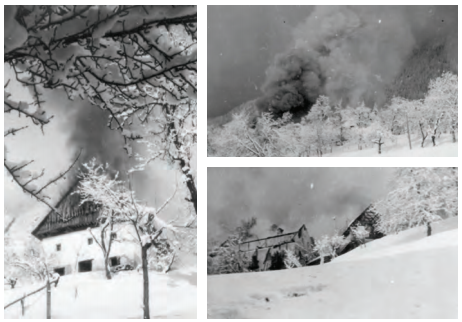
Germans burning Dražgoše

Two days after the Dražgoše engagement, German troops attacked two Partisan platoons on the Mošnje Pasture (Mošenjska planina). During the 13-hour engagement, some 12 Partisans were killed and five were wounded.

After the battle at Dražgoše, German troops killed 41 villagers, including 21 civilians at Jelenšče, executing 18 (among them 7 children below 18 years, including two 11-year-olds, and a 13-year-old). They killed two more trying to escape, and also killed a 3-year-old girl, when a German soldier threw a grenade into a cellar full of civilians. During the evening of the following day, a further 18 male residents who had previously escaped, only to be apprehended as they returned, were executed, houses were looted, and the village was set on fire. In February 1942, the Germans returned to demolish the entire village with explosives, forbidding entry into the village until the end of the war. The remaining villagers were then rounded up and sent to concentration camps.

The German public announcement of the destruction of the village and the sending of women and children to concentration camps, proclaimed this was because the villagers did not report the Partisans’ presence, which was clearly a lie, since the villagers reported the Partisans’ presence, with the approval of the Partisans, so they would not be held responsible. After listing the reprisals taken, the German announcement finished with a threat to all the residents of Upper Carniola: "Whoever is against us will be executed."

After the war, a number of memorials were erected in the village, including: 1) a memorial in front of the church with the names of 41 hostages shot by the Germans, plus 16 Dražgoše residents killed as members of the Partisans from 1942 to 1945; 2) a monument at the church to 18 Dražgoše residents executed by the Germans at that spot, erected by the Partisan Veterans Association; 3) a memorial at Jelenšče to 21 Dražgoše residents executed there by the Germans after the battle, erected by the Partisan Veterans Association; 4) a memorial at the church graveyard, where the hostages and Partisans were buried before they were transferred to a common grave; and 5) a large monument where 40 hostages and 8 Partisans are buried.

== Interpretations ==
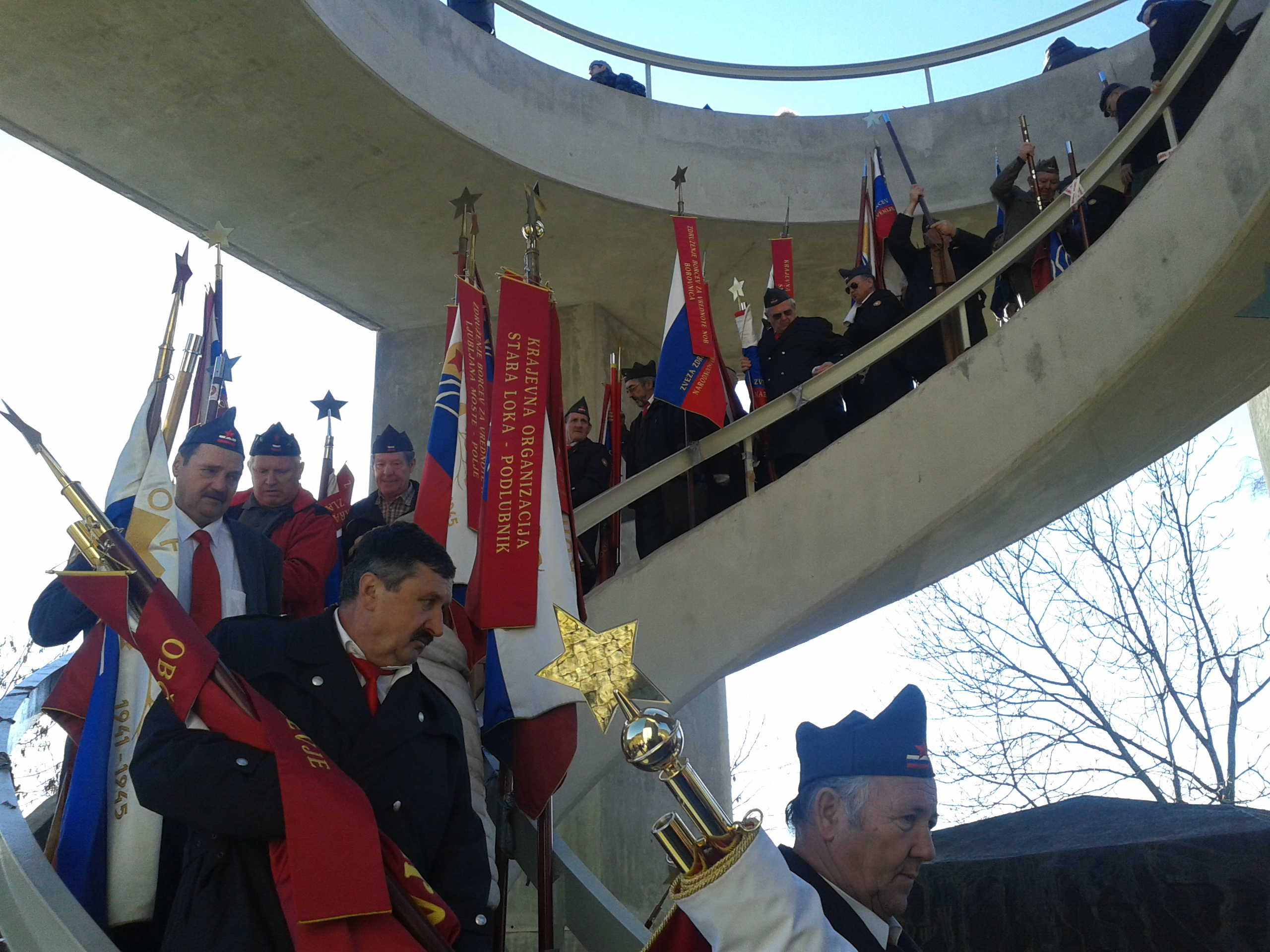
2014 commemoration

News of the Battle of Dražgoše spread to the United States, where it was lauded as a heroic act of defiance in occupied Europe. The battle was further celebrated in communist-era and present day Slovenia. The first small monument to the killed Partisans and villagers was erected in 1947. Based on interviews with Partisans and villagers, in 1971 Ivan Jan wrote a popular book on the Dražgoše battle which drew further attention to the event, and in 1976 a large monument was raised dedicated to the nine fallen Partisans and 41 executed civilians; three other monuments were also raised for the executed villagers. From soon after the battle to decades later, German casualties were overestimated by various Slovene sources, erroneously citing anywhere from at least 100 German dead and wounded to hundreds of German casualties. Jan stated that there were hundreds of German casualties, or at least 100 dead and 200 wounded, and he repeatedly claimed that the Germans were concealing information about the extent of their losses, noting that German documents were unavailable, and thus that there were no exact data on German losses. In a 1955, account a villager stated that German soldiers had told him they had suffered 1,200 dead at Dražgoše, or that there had not been even a single Partisan casualty. Yet a 1977 article stated that German casualties were unknown. The actual, German casualty counts of 27 dead, plus 42 wounded, were established only during the 1980s, when the relevant German historical documents became available.

The battle was also highly praised after Slovenia declared independence and introduced democracy. Danilo Türk, the president of Slovenia, described the Battle of Dražgoše as the "biggest moral victory" of the Slovene nation and as the "victory of responsibility for the future of one's own nation" in 2008. He stated that it was a foundation for Slovenia as an independent country. Commemorations of the battle are held every year at Dražgoše, with thousands of participants, including the president of Slovenia and other senior leaders. Some critical Slovene commentators have described the commemorations as a "cult."

Franc Kavčič, a longtime resident of Dražgoše who lived through the battle, has more recently presented a diverging first-hand personal account of the battle and subsequent events. According to his telling, the Partisans were invited to the village by supporters, and refused to leave following a subsequent request by some villagers. The Partisans then retreated after an initial scuffle. Afterwards the Germans herded his father and 18 male villagers into the priest's residence, where they burned them alive. The Germans also sought to burn alive the 10-year-old Kavčič and his mother, along with 60 women and children, but a local official convinced them not to. Instead, the Germans expelled and imprisoned the women and children and surviving men, while burning and then blowing up with explosives the village, later returning to also blow up the church. In August 1945, a government minister of the newly established communist Yugoslav state visited Dražgoše to present a plan to rebuild the village to a handful of residents present at the time. The minister proposed that two large apartment buildings and two communal barns be built by the state, with the rest of the land converted into common pastureland. The villagers expected the government provide funds for the reconstruction of individual houses. The meeting ended when an enraged villager spit in the government representative's face. The villagers rebuilt Dražgoše without state support from 1949 to 1960, financed by revenues from a cooperative sawmill enterprise they established following the war. The state didn't see through a promise to construct a road to the village. Kavčič notes that views regarding the commemoration differ among residents, with villagers divided into two "camps" on the issue.

Another perspective is provided in documents related to the German Catholic priest, Rudolf Besel, whom the Austrian Church sent to Upper Carniola after the Germans expelled nearly all the Slovene priests and other intellectuals from Upper Carniola, since they planned to annex the region to Germany and Germanize local Slovenes. Besel was called to Dražgoše 10 days before the battle, to officiate over a funeral, where local Partisans were in attendance, and he noted "they greeted me honorably." He sought to stay entirely neutral in the war, so the Partisans gave him a pass to travel around to attend to believers in the many priest-emptied parishes throughout Upper Carniola. He was the priest who secretly buried the 41 Dražgoše villagers executed by the Germans, and later saved the gold-leaf altars from the ornate Dražgoše church before the Germans blew it up (although later the Germans stole some of its most valuable statuettes). Afterwards, sources say the Germans tried to blame the Partisans for the executions of villagers, and tried to present as a "rescue" the German jailing of Dražgoše women and children. Besel stayed on as a beloved priest after the war in Slovenia, but due mainly to enmity and distrust from the local Slovenian Church and priests, he finally left Slovenia in 1947, expressing homesickness for Slovenia thereafter.

According to a 2005 book by Corsellis and Ferrar that narrates the testimonies of anti-Partisan and anti-communist Slovene refugees and exiles after the war, the Partisans believed that uprisings such as the one at Dražgoše and the resulting reprisals turned the population against the Germans. Anti-communist Catholics believed that the Partisans staged such uprisings in or near Catholic villages deliberately so that Catholics would be targeted by reprisals, they write, and thought the battle was a "harmful waste of effort".

French literature professor and political analyst Boštjan M. Turk characterised the Battle of Dražgoše as a "national anguish and a disgrace for the Partisan movement". According to Turk, "Dražgoše represents a major defeat of the will and spirit of the resistance against the Nazis because innocent people paid for the Partisan hoax with their lives." Turk believes that, from the communist point of view, Dražgoše was a success because it raised fear among people and made carrying out the revolution and the conquest of power much easier.

The historian Stane Granda has described the Battle of Dražgoše as a "catastrophic miscalculation" and the "devastation of the village of Dražgoše", and its contemporary national celebration as an "ideological and political construction".

The historian and curator of the Slovene Military Museum, Martin Premk, notes that whereas Slovene historians in the former Yugoslavia, such as Tone Ferenc, dealt with the battle objectively, in the 1960s, a popular book by the non-historian Ivan Jan appeared, which spurred greater interest in Dražgoše, but also included some exaggerations. Then, following Slovene independence, attacks appeared on the Battle of Dražgoše, according to Premk the most ridiculous being the claim that the Partisans chose Dražgoše because they somehow knew in advance that the Germans would execute locals and burn the village in reprisal. After these extremes, Premk sees a return to more traditional assessments, which includes the fact that the Dražgoše battle resonated as an important symbol in Slovenia and even the world, of heroic resistance to German annexation. He also mentions the extreme reprisals by the Germans, including the attempt to completely wipe out the village, as proof of the threat it presented to the German forces. Premk's position has been characterized by some media as questionable and politically motivated. On the other hand, Spomenka Hribar, an author, a key figure in Slovene independence and recipient of the EU Parliament's European Citizen's prize, states that the referenced critics of Premk, like Jože Dežman and others on the political right, engage in political and ideological manipulation of WWII history and the dead, in an attempt to slander the Partisan movement, and justify collaboration with the Nazis and fascists. Jelka Gortnar, who as a young girl witnessed the battle, told that the partisans had been betrayed by three men from Dražgoše and the neighbouring village Češnjica: Anžic, Cvirn and Pinter.
