= Srednja Dobrava =

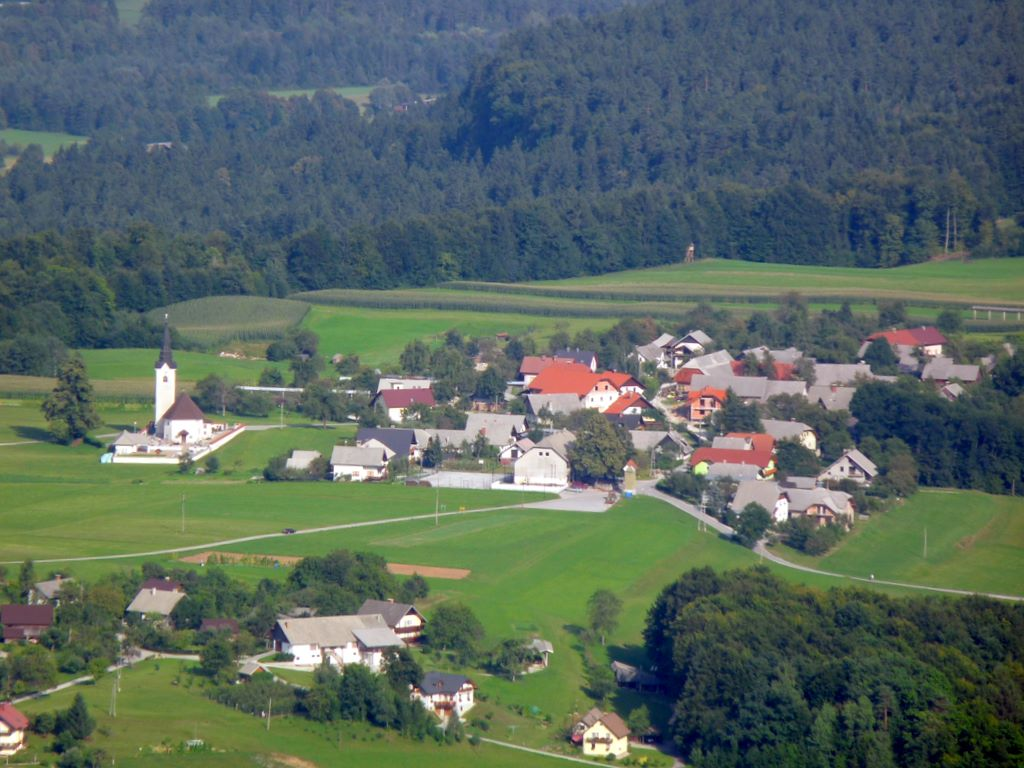

- Location in Slovenia
- Coordinates: 46°18′22.75″N 14°13′10.17″E
- Country: Slovenia
- Region: Upper Carniola
- Statistical region: Upper Carniola
- Municipality: Radovljica
- Elevation: 498.2 m (1,635 ft)

Population (2002)
  - Total: 112

Srednja Dobrava (pronounced [ˈsɾeːdnja dɔˈbɾaːʋa]) is a settlement in the Municipality of Radovljica in the Upper Carniola region of Slovenia.

== Geography ==
Srednja Dobrava stands on a plain extending 500 meters (1,600 ft) between the Sava Valley and the Lipnica, which runs parallel to the Sava below the Jelovica Plateau. Woods and fields, interrupted in places by karst sinkholes, gently descend from Kamna Gorica to Podnart. The local community of Srednja Dobrava encompasses the villages of Srednja Dobrava, Spodnja Dobrava, Zgornja Dobrava, Mišače, and Lipnica. The parish church in the village is dedicated to the Exaltation of the Cross and belongs to the Archdiocese of Ljubljana.

== Name ==
The name Srednja Dobrava literally means 'middle Dobrava' and reflects its elevation contrast with neighboring Spodnja Dobrava (literally, 'lower Dobrava', about 18 meters or 59 feet lower) and Zgornja Dobrava (literally, 'upper Dobrava', about 11 meters or 36 feet higher). The place name Dobrava is relatively frequent in Slovenia. It is derived from the Slovene common noun dobrava 'gently rolling partially wooded land' (and archaically 'woods, grove'). The name therefore refers to the local geography.

== History ==
Iron ore was collected and melted by metal workers in Kropa and Kamna Gorica. The only remnant of this period is the entrance into the Štolm Tunnel, dating back to the 18th century, which cuts through the Dobrava Plain from west to east. Farms in the area supplied the metalworkers of Kropa and Kamna Gorica with wheat. On December 5, 1941, German forces arrested 42 families and sent 23 families (81 people of a total population of 352) into forced labor in Germany; December 5 is the local memorial holiday. In the cemetery there is a monument to 18 residents that died as Partisans or were shot in retribution by the Germans during the Second World War. The central figure of the resistance in Srednja Dobrava was the teacher Stane Žagar.

== Culture and tourism ==
Srednja Dobrava is accessible by road from four directions: 1) from the south from the road from Kranj to Kropa, 2) from the north from the highway or the old route from Kranj to Radovljica via the Brezje (Dobro Polje) exit, 3) from the north from the road from Radovljica to Kropa at the Lipnica exit, and 4) from the south from the road from Kranj to Kropa at Podnart exit. By train, hikers can use three railway stations: Podnart, Otoče, or Globoko. It takes 30 minutes to reach Srednja Dobrava through the steep woods from Otoče and somewhat longer to get there from the other two stations. There are nice views of the Sava River and the Karawanks from the viewing points at Ojstra Peč and Stovc on the northern edge of the Dobrava Plain, and a picturesque church at Jamnik can be seen from the middle of the plain. The Jakob Aljaž memorial trail crosses Srednja Dobrava; Aljaž was a priest at Srednja Dobrava at the end of the 19th century. Other notable residents or visitors to the area were the priest Janez Jalen, writer Joža Lovrenčič, painter Božidar Jakac, photographer Janko Balantič, and rowing champion Luka Špik. A restaurant with a garden is located in the middle of the village, and is a stopping point for bikers, strollers, and pilgrims to the church in Brezje and horse riders. In the winter, the Dobrava Plain is used for cross-country skiing and skating. It is a 30-minute walk to Kropa, where the forging museum is located. It takes one or two hours on foot to reach the Jamnik church on the slopes of Jelovica, the Partisan Lodge at Vodice Pasture on the Jelovica Plateau above Kropa, Radovljica (crossing the Sava River on the Fuks Footbridge), and the ruins of Lipnica Castle.

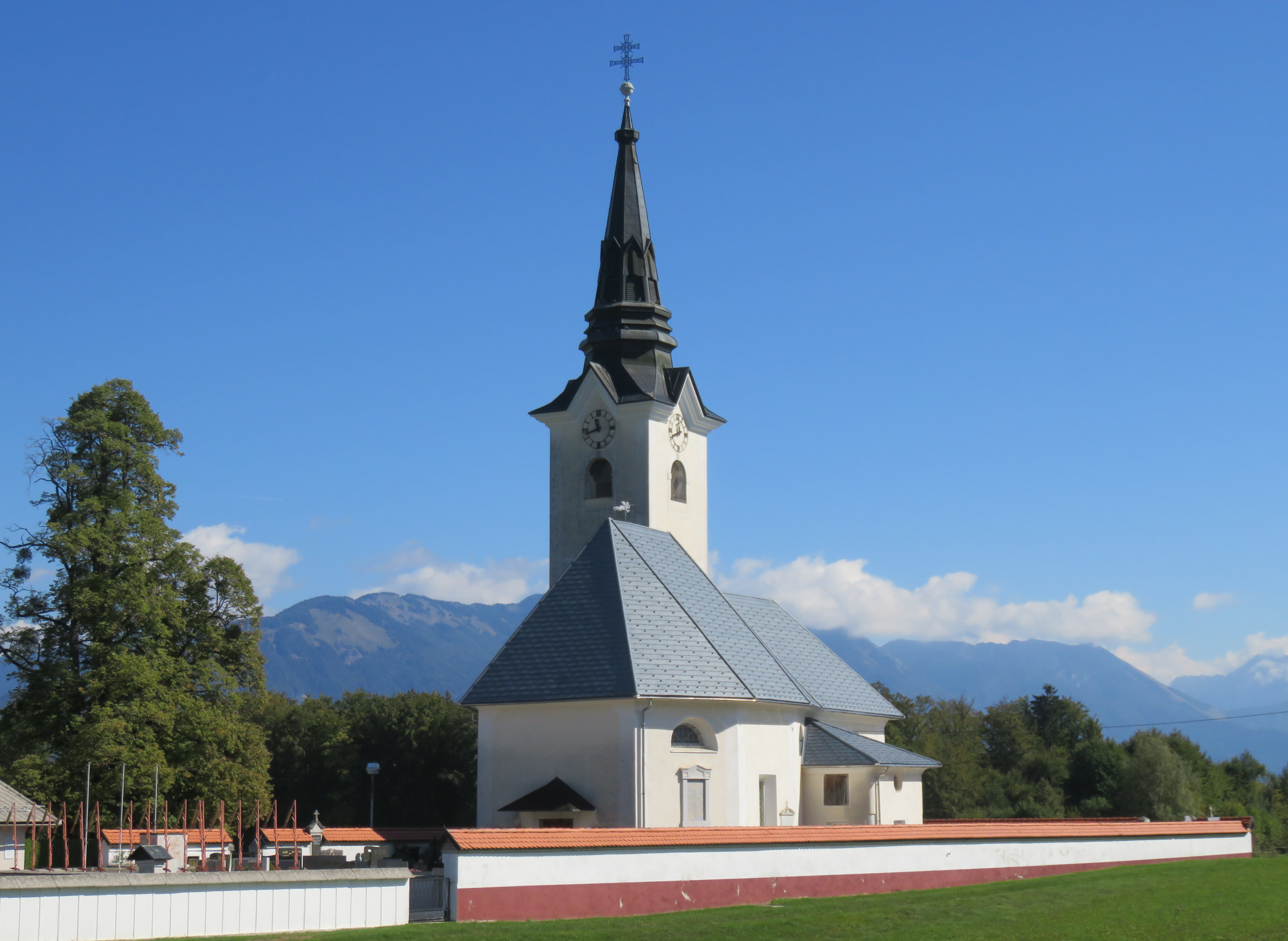
Holy Cross Church

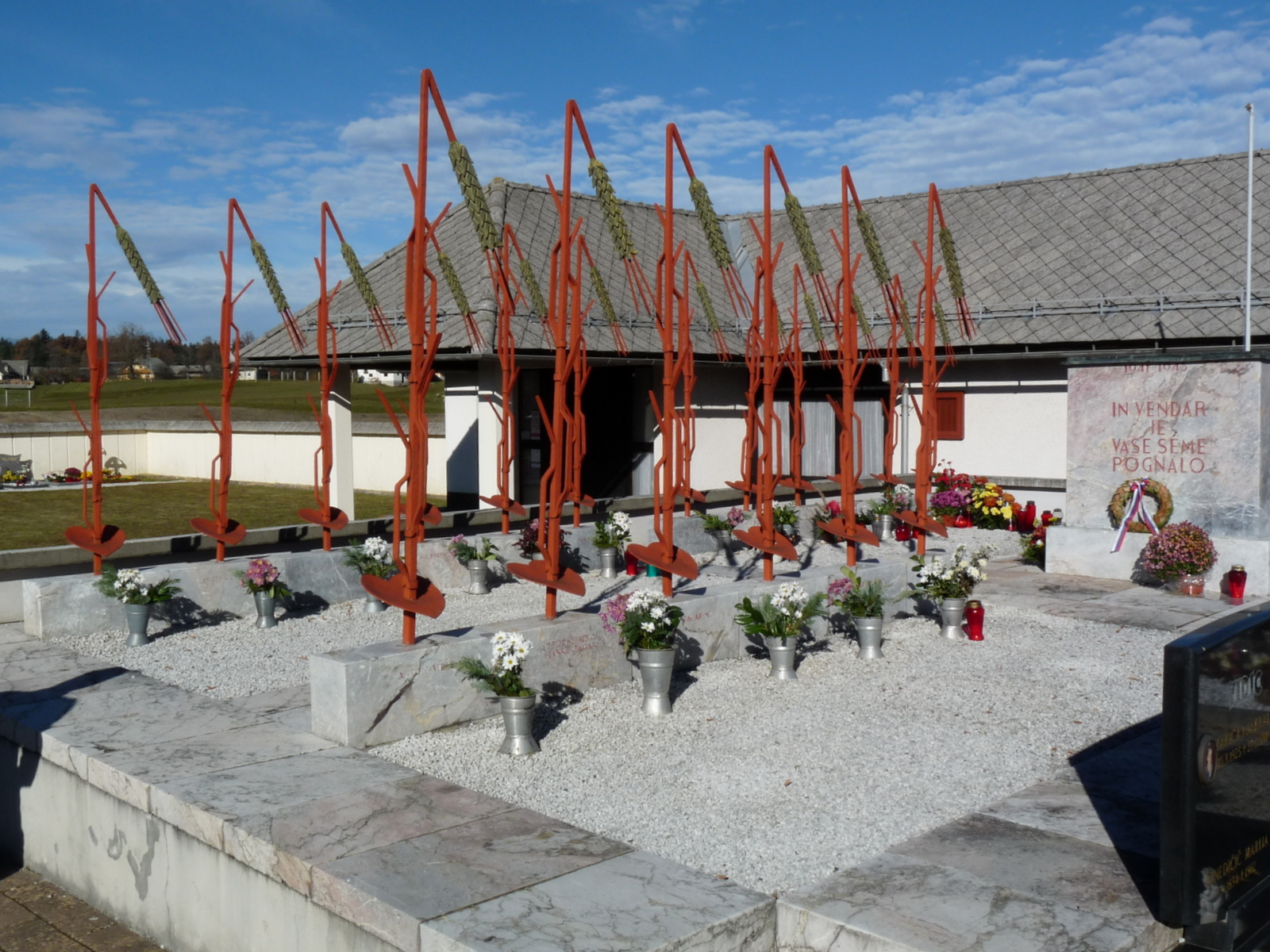
Monument to victims of Nazism

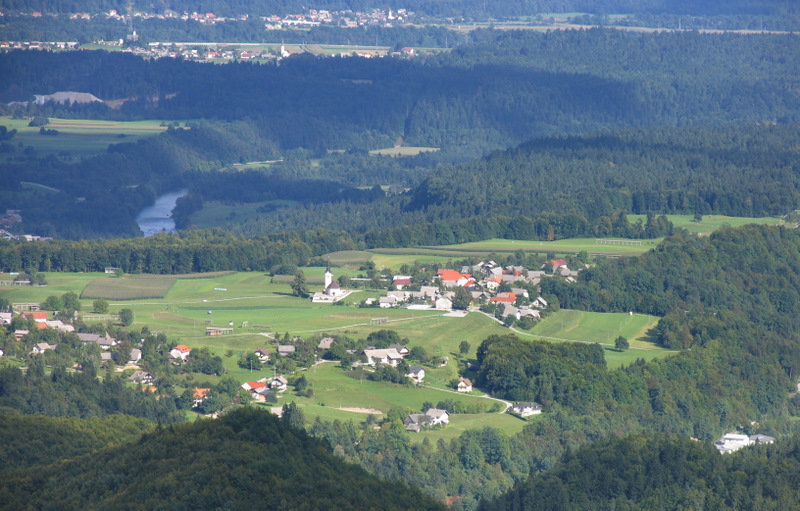
Zgornja Dobrava and Srednja Dobrava from the Jelovica Plateau

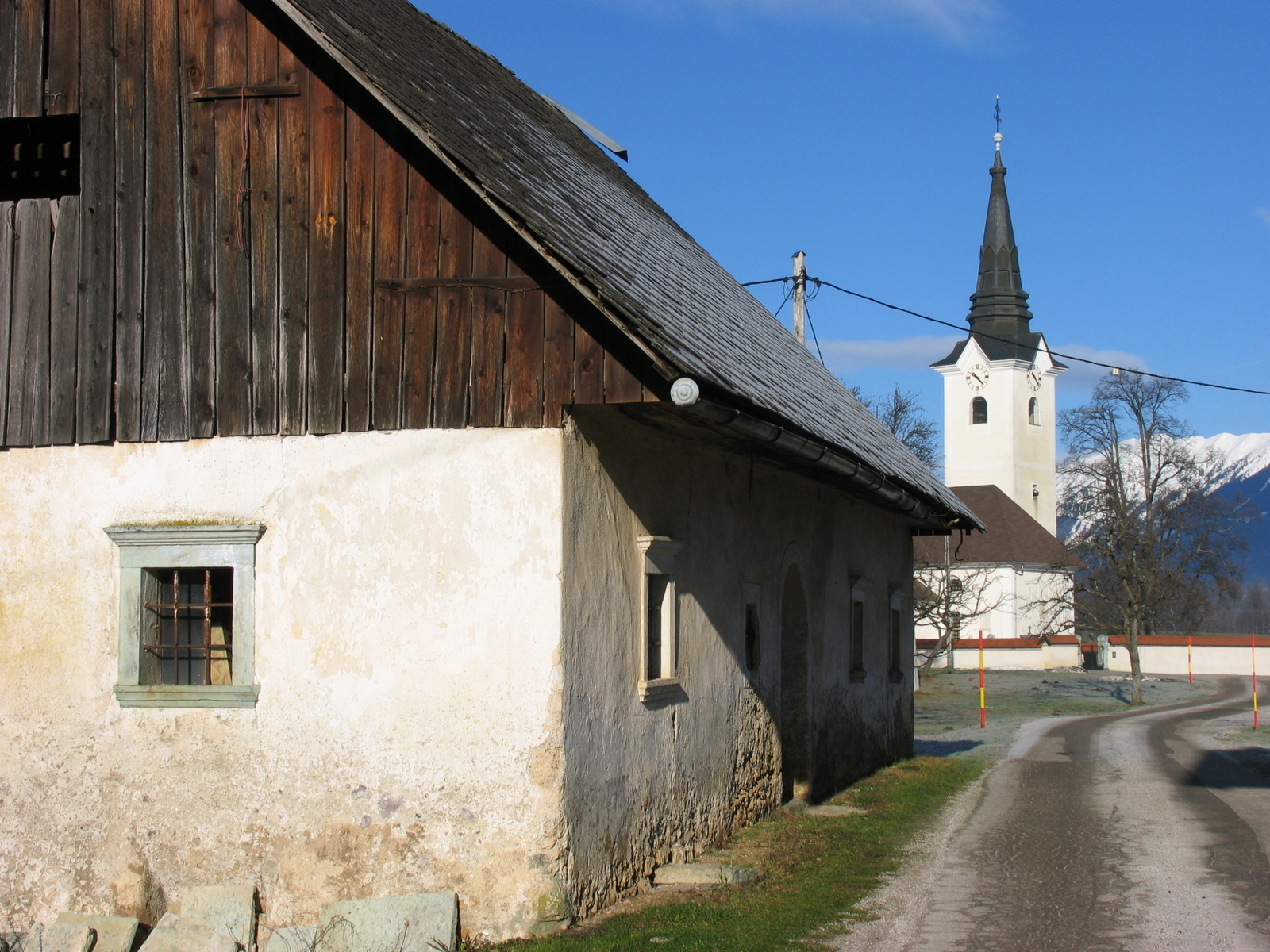
Sexton's house, no longer inhabited
