= Dražgoše =

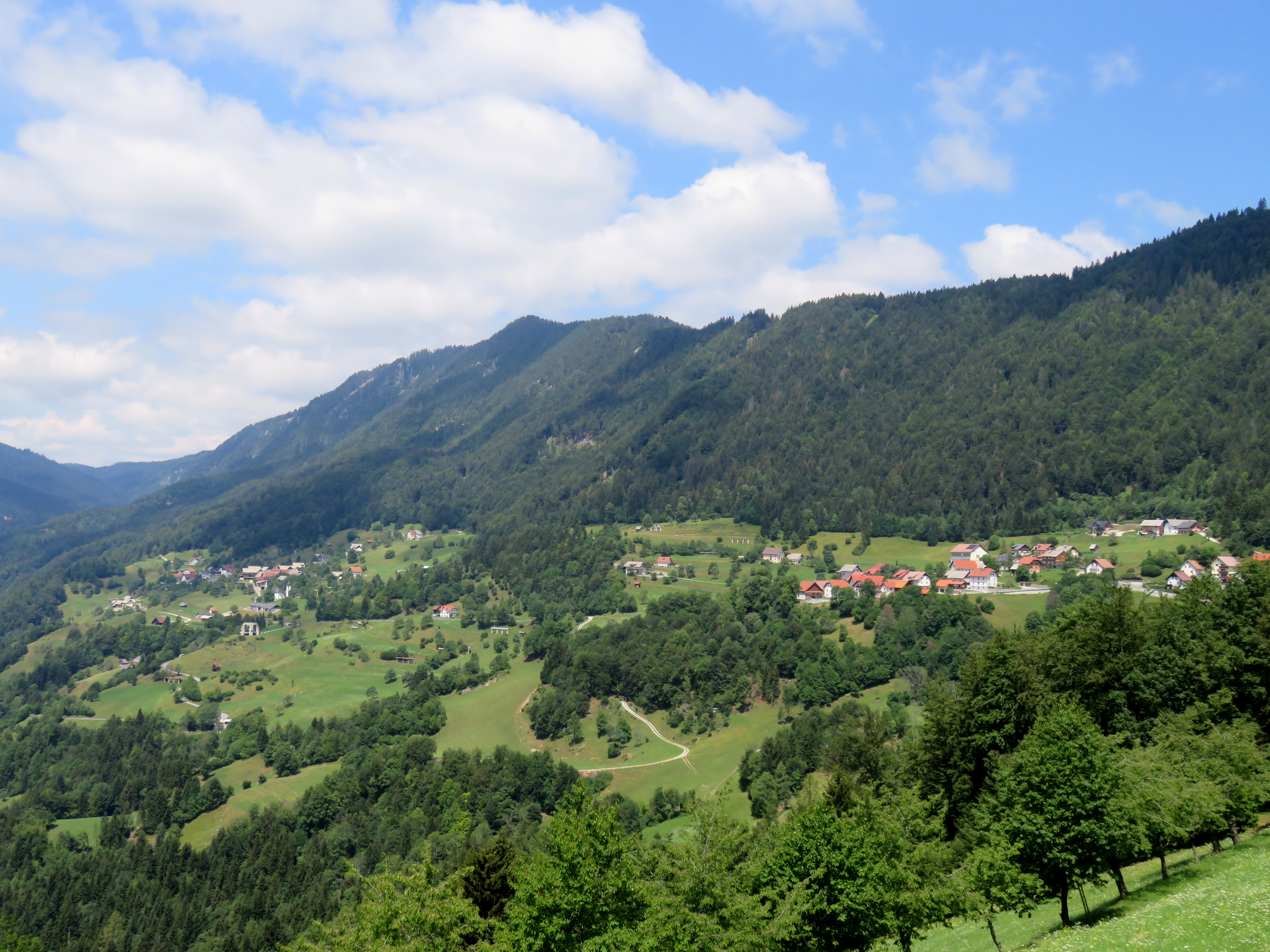

- Location in Slovenia
- Coordinates: 46°15′8.94″N 14°10′34.63″E
- Country: Slovenia
- Traditional Region: Upper Carniola
- Statistical region: Upper Carniola
- Municipality: Železniki

Area
  - Total: 20.483 km^{2} (7.909 sq mi)
- Elevation: 831.5 m (2,728 ft)

Population (2026)
  - Total: 308
  - Density: 15/km^{2} (39/sq mi)

Dražgoše (pronounced [ˈdɾaːʒɡɔʃɛ]; German: Draschgosche) is a village in the Municipality of Železniki in the Upper Carniola region of Slovenia. The village lies on the southern slopes of the Jelovica Plateau. The settlement consists of three hamlets: Pri Cerkvi, Na Pečeh, and Jelenšče. In January 2026, the population was 308.

== Name ==
Dražgoše was attested in written sources in 1291 as Drasigos (and as Drasigvs in 1318 and Draschigosch in 1481). The name is derived from *Dražigosťane, a plural demonym derived from the Slavic personal name *Dražigostь, referring to a local resident. In the past it was known as Draschgosche in German.

== History ==
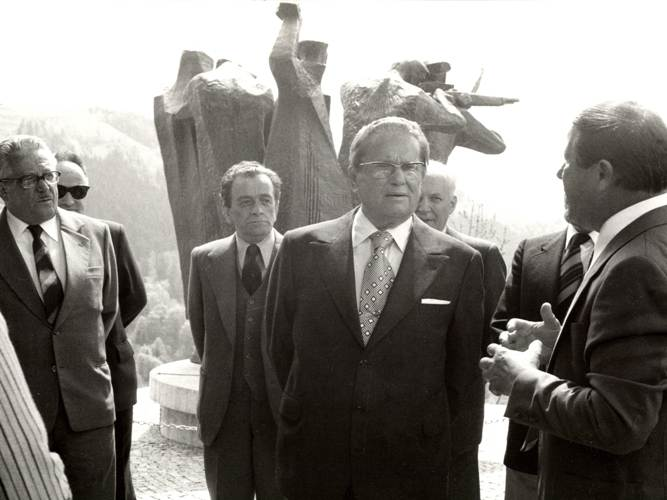
President of Yugoslavia Josip Broz Tito in Dražgoše (1977)

Dražgoše was already inhabited in prehistoric times, as evidenced by archaeological excavations at a hillfort in the hamlet of Jelenšče. The site has visible defensive trenches.

A school was established in Dražgoše in 1894, replacing instruction that had previously been offered at the sexton's residence in the village since 1889.

What is now Dražgoše was originally two villages named Pri Cerkvi (German: Draschgosche bei der Kirche) (with the hamlet of Jelenšče; in older sources Jelenčice) and Na Pečeh (Draschgosche vor der Kirche). These were combined into today's single village in 1931.

During the Second World War it was the site of the Battle of Dražgoše between Slovene Partisans and Nazi Germany armed forces, which took place between January 9 and January 11, 1942. After suffering heavy losses the Nazi forces set fire to the village, shot 41 hostages, and deported the remaining residents. In 1976 the Dražgoše war memorial was built just outside the village to commemorate this battle and the destruction of the village.

In August 1945, the new communist government presented a plan to modernize the village by rebuilding it with apartment blocks and collective farm infrastructure. The villagers reacted negatively to this plan, and then the government withheld funding for reconstruction, and so the villagers rebuilt Dražgoše themselves without any state support from 1949 to 1960. The government also left the road to the village—which was built using forced labor by German prisoners of war—unfinished, stopping construction at Rudno. The road connection from Rudno to the hamlet of Na Pečeh was completed in the fall of 1949, allowing the villagers to transport cement and brick to the village using motorized transport. A road connection was built from the village to Jamnik in 1966.

A water main was installed at Na Pečeh in Dražgoše in 1946, and it was expanded to Pri Cerkvi in 1950. The village received a telephone connection in 1952. Construction of a new primary school in the village started in 1953, and the school was opened in 1959.

== Church ==
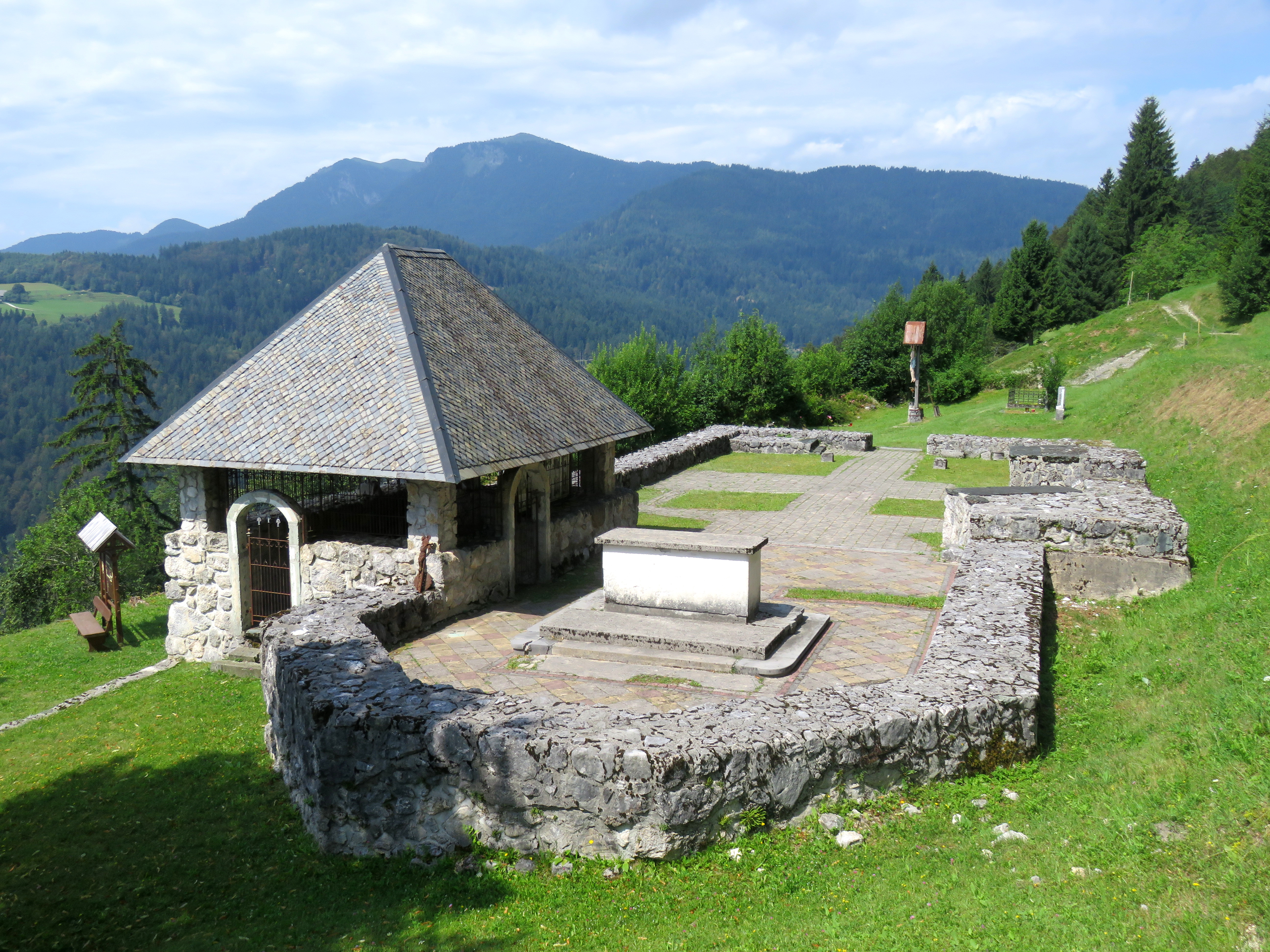
Old Saint Lucy's Church

The parish church in Dražgoše stands in the hamlet of Pri Cerkvi and is dedicated to Saint Lucy. It is administered by the Parish of Železniki. The current church was designed by Anton Bitenc in 1964 and built in 1967, after two decades of bureaucratic opposition. It features paintings by Stane Kregar.

The new church replaced an older structure destroyed in 1942. That church was a Baroque structure dating from 1642. Masses were held at the ruins of the old church until its successor was built. Today the stonework from the old church is stored in the former bell tower, and the church's gilded altar is displayed at the Loka Museum in Škofja Loka. Masses are offered at the ruins of the old church before the Feast of the Ascension and on All Souls' Day.

== Notable people ==
Notable people that were born or lived in Dražgoše include:

- Luka Jelenc (1857–1942), educator, journalist, and politician
