= Pogačnik =

Pogačnik is a surname. Notable people with the surname include:

- Anka Pogačnik (born 1991), Slovene judoka
- Antun Pogačnik (1913–1978), Croatian footballer
- Jože Pogačnik (1932–2016), Slovene film director and screenwriter
- Jožef Pogačnik (1866–1932), Slovene politician
- Marko Pogačnik (born 1944), Slovene artist and author
- Milan Pogačnik (born 1946), Slovene politician
- Nevenka Pogačnik (born 1936), Slovene gymnast
- Tone Pogačnik (1919–2013), Slovene cross-country skier
