= Jarc =

Jarc is a surname. Notable people with the surname include:

- Blaž Jarc (born 1988), Slovenian cyclist
- Iztok Jarc (born 1963), Slovenian diplomat and politician
- Miran Jarc (1900–1942), Slovenian writer, poet, playwright, and essayist
