= Zgornja Dobrava, Radovljica =

Zgornja Dobrava
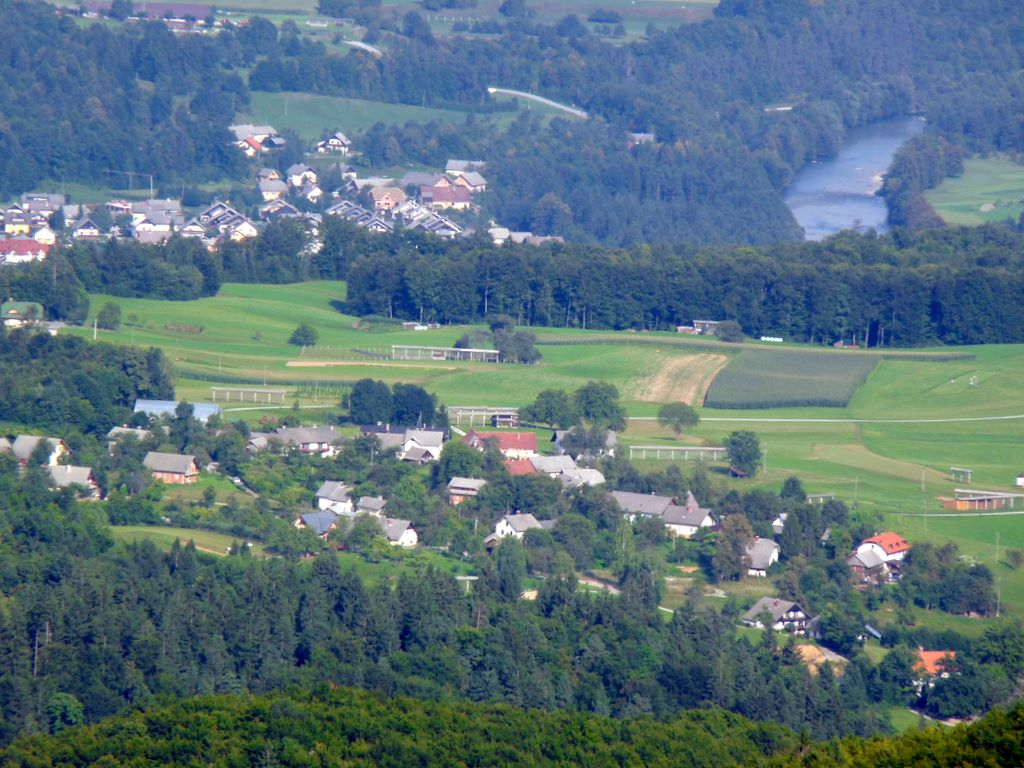

- Location in Slovenia
- Coordinates: 46°18′34.91″N 14°12′48.03″E
- Country: Slovenia
- Region: Upper Carniola
- Statistical region: Upper Carniola
- Municipality: Radovljica
- Elevation: 508.8 m (1,669 ft)

Population (2002)
  - Total: 128

Zgornja Dobrava (pronounced [ˈzɡoːɾnja dɔˈbɾaːʋa]) is a settlement in the Municipality of Radovljica in the Upper Carniola region of Slovenia.

== Name ==
Zgornja Dobrava was attested in written sources as Oberhard in 1351 and Hard in 1368. The name Zgornja Dobrava literally means 'upper Dobrava' and reflects its elevation contrast with neighboring Srednja Dobrava (literally, 'middle Dobrava', about 11 meters or 36 feet lower) and Spodnja Dobrava (literally, 'lower Dobrava', about 28 meters or 92 feet lower). The place name Dobrava is relatively frequent in Slovenia. It is derived from the Slovene common noun dobrava 'gently rolling partially wooded land' (and archaically 'woods, grove'). The name therefore refers to the local geography.
