= Pozareport.si =

Slovenian news website

Požareport.si is a Slovenian news and opinion website and blog that focuses on political and corruption events, investigative reporting into government corruption, nepotism, government controlled corporations, and personal disclosures about Slovenian politicians, media, and local media personalities and celebrities.

The website offers mainly original content and it publishes up to two articles per day. Požareport was first to publish some of the largest scandals in Slovenia, including a politically sensitive Baričević affair. In the current Slovenian government, three government ministers and some other office holders resigned soon after articles about them were published by Požareport.

It was founded and it is primarily edited by Bojan Požar, an investigative journalist; the name Požareport is a play on words, with požar (Slovene pronunciation: [pɔʒáːr]) being both Požar's surname and the Slovene word for fire.

== History and production ==
Požareport was launched in 2007 by Bojan Požar who had until 2016 been an editor-in-chief of Direkt, owned by daily newspaper Dnevnik. In 2016, Požar published a book Melania Trump: The Inside Story, depicting life of the First Lady of the United States when she still lived in Slovenia. Since 2017, the Požareport team runs a daily television political show Faktor. The first producers and journalists were Vladimir Vodušek, Bojan Požar and Sebastjan Jeretič. As of October 2019, Faktor is made by Aljuš Pertinač, Bernard Brščič and Bojan Požar.

== Notable cases ==
=== The Baričević "Bullmastiff Affair" ===
On February 2, 2010, media reported a respected medical doctor named Saša Baričević, who regularly treated country's elite including government ministers, was killed by his own dogs. The three Bullmastiffs were well known to Slovenian public from events a few years earlier, when they attacked and severely injured a bypasser on a street. Although at that time the dogs were at first determined to be too dangerous to be kept alive, the Administrative Court, with judge Boštan Zalar, the brother of a minister of justice Aleš Zalar, ruled that the dogs should be returned to Baričević.

On February 5, 2010, Požareport published an article that the police officers found a dildo with a condom near Baričević's dead body. According to Požareport, the article was viewed more than a million times, which makes it the most read article in the history of Slovenia. This claim has not been disputed.

The article published a crime scene photo, secretly taken by a police officer, showing a mutilated human body, a plastic penis nearby, and an alive dog, which was visibly bloody around its anus. It also published numerous details, leaked from the police investigation, including the Baričević's last words, when the police found him naked and still alive. The article also stated that for decades Saša Baričević had been a transgender female. In subsequent weeks, the police carried out internal investigation to find a person who leaked the crime scene photographs to Požareport. In several subsequent articles, Požareport described the friendship between Saša Baričević and Minister of interior Katarina Kresal and her domestic partner attorney Miro Senica. Articles suspected that there was another person in a garage besides Baričević's dogs. The morning after the tragedy, Minister of Interior unexpectedly did not appear at the weekly government meeting, she reported that she was skiing in St. Moritz, Switzerland, and a few days later she appeared with a bound on her arm. Media published photos from the crime scene of the morning after the Baričević's death, showing Ministry of Agriculture State Secretary Sonja Bukovec crying and hugging sister of Baričević. In the parliament, a motion of no confidence (called interpellation in Slovenia) was initiated against the Minister of Agriculture Milan Pogačnik for numerous irregularities in the events related to Baričević's dogs and the minister resigned. DNA of all three dogs was found on the condom.

=== Peter Vilfan tax evasion ===
In January 2019, Požareport published a series of articles revealing tax evasion by the Prime Minister Marjan Šarec's Cabinet State Secretary Peter Vilfan. On January 15, Vilfan made a public statement denying allegations. On March 1, 2019, Vilfan resigned.

=== Articles and resignation of minister Jure Leben ===
In February and March 2019, Požareport published a series of articles disclosing documents that showed how minister Jure Leben and Public Relations agency Futura transferred money from the state budget. Leben resigned due to corruption investigation and "media pressure".

=== Withdrawals of political candidatures ===
On March 6, 2019, Požareport disclosed that the European Parliament candidate Katja Damij is heavily in debts and owes unpaid taxes. In another article, Požareport disclosed that she emailed her business partners denying that she was in debts, and then the political party replaced her with another candidate.

On September 3, 2018, Požareport disclosed that a minister candidate Tugomir Kodelja had been fired from his previous job due to improper behavior. On September 5, prime minister Marjan Šarec removed him from the candidates' list.

== Court proceedings ==
Požareport and Bojan Požar have been sued several times. Most of these lawsuits were unsuccessful, including nine lawsuits by attorney Miro Senica. Senica and former minister Katarina Kresal filed criminal charges against Požareport or Požar eight times, and the authorities dropped all of them.

In 2009 and 2019, in separate cases, Bojan Požar was convicted for defamations of Edvard Oven and Viktor Knavs, the father of Melania Trump, but appellate courts annulled both convictions and ruled in Požar's favor. Knavs claimed that Požareport had published that he had been in jail, and Požar claimed that the disputed sentence was removed from the website in half an hour as soon as he was informed that it may be false.
