= Micka Pavlič =

Slovenian folk artist (1821–1991)

- Born: Micka Pavlič; March 30, 1821; Selca
- Died: September 12, 1891 (aged 70); Selca
- Occupation: Folk artist
- Known for: Painted beehive panels

Micka Pavlič, also called Marija Pavlič, Podnartovčeva Micka or Blažičeva Micka, (March 30, 1821 – September 12, 1891) was a Slovenian folk artist. She is best known for her vividly decorated beehive panels, which are among the best created in 19th century Austrian Empire.

== Early life ==
She was born on March 30, 1821, in Selca in a poor family. Her mother was a very small farmer Elizabeta Gašperič, and her father was a folk artist Andrej Pavlič (1790–1873). She had one sister, who letter become a very small farmer. At the young age her father started teaching her his art.

== Career ==
By her late teens she had surpassed her father and opened her own studio in Selca. Her father helped her. She specialized in:

- Beehive panels: Wooden boards fitted to the entrances of beehives, decorated with scenes ranging from biblical narratives to allegorical and rural motifs.
- Glass paintings: Small-scale devotional images painted on glass panes for home altars.
- Wood carvings: "Bridke mantre" (devotional plaques) and other devotional figures for private and church use.

Her command of both pigment and chisel earned her a reputation.

She manufactured beehive panels, for which she used stencils punched with dozens of tiny holes. Pigment in powdered form was applied by tapping a bag over the stencil, creating sharp, vibrant designs that have survived remarkably intact.

== Latter years ==
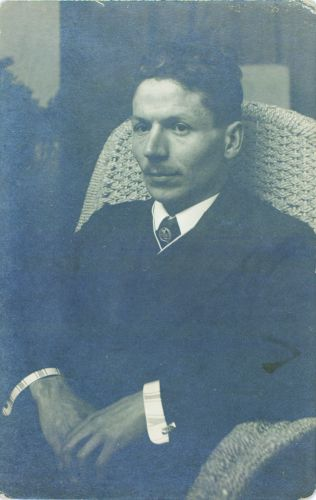
Micka's great nephew and her student, the painter Peter Žmitek

Micka taught painting to her sister's grandson Peter Žmitek. He went on to became a renowned Slovenian painter. After death of her parents she lived alone with two goats. She never married and never had children. She devoted herself only to art and painted until her death on September 12, 1891, in Selca.

== Style and technique ==
Micka's figures are highly stylized. They are defined by clothing, posture, and activity rather than individualized features and rendered in a palette of reds (including Indian red), ochre, browns, blues, and greens. The use of stencils and powdered pigment ensured that her colors remained vivid even after decades out of direct sunlight. Her workshop catalogue included at least 141 distinct motifs, 71 religious and 70 secular, ranging from biblical and devotional scenes to secular genre motifs such as the initiation rites of Mandan Native Americans, peasants quarreling over livestock, battle scenes and a Turk smoking a pipe.

== Legacy ==
Examples of Micka's beehive panels and glass paintings are preserved in the collections of the Slovenski etnografski muzej (Slovenian Ethnographic Museum) and the Loški muzej in Škofja Loka. Her work remains a keystone of Slovenian folk-art studies, documented in Gorazd Makarovič's 1962 monograph Panjske končnice ljudske slikarske delavnice iz Selc and in Boštjan Soklič's 2015 article Indijanci Micke Pavlič (Native Americans of Micka Pavlič) in Loški razgledi. Examples of her panels are held in public collections and continue to be studied as exemplars of 19th-century Carniolan folk painting.

== Gallery ==
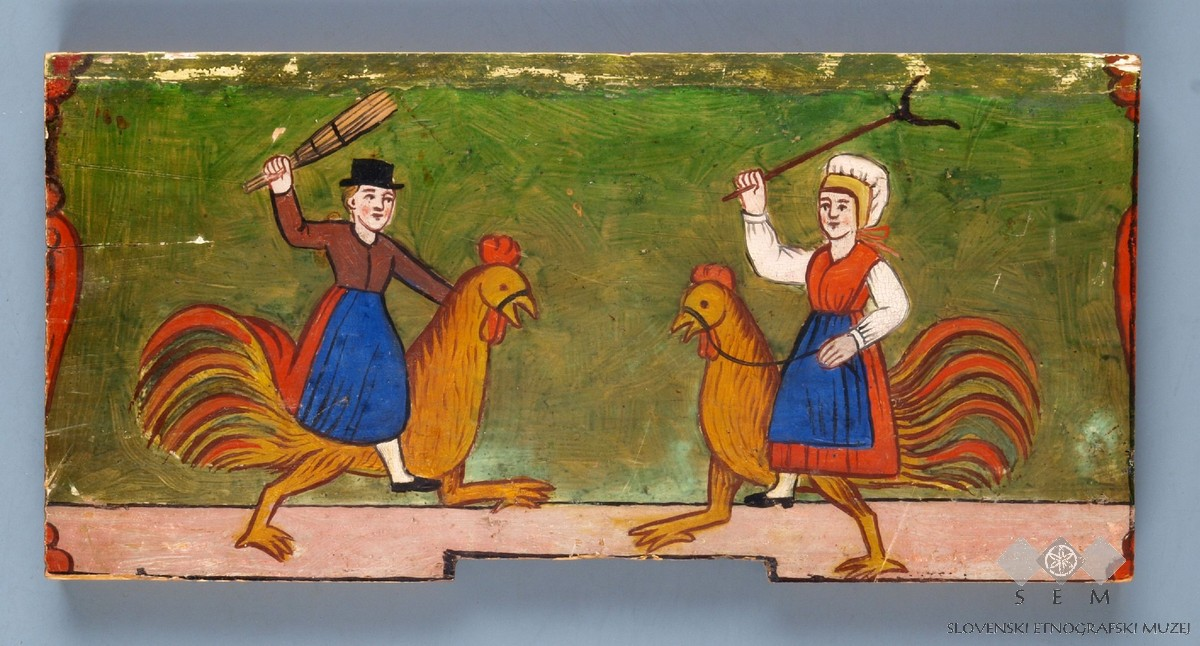
Duel between the Carinthian Woman and the Carniolan Woman (beehive panel)

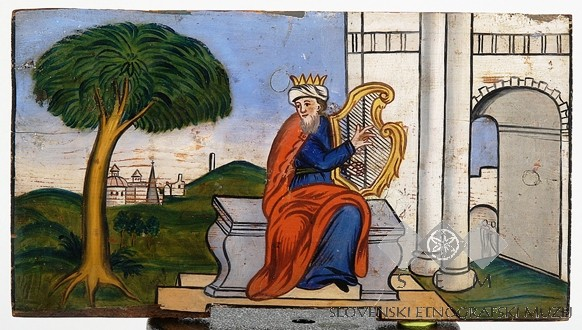
King David (beehive panel)

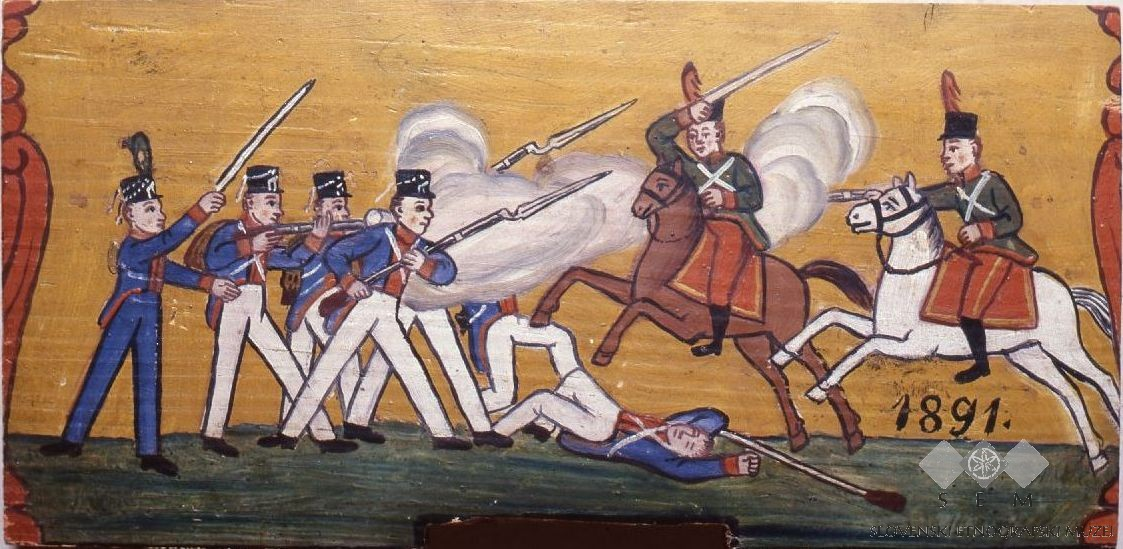
Battle scene (beehive panel)

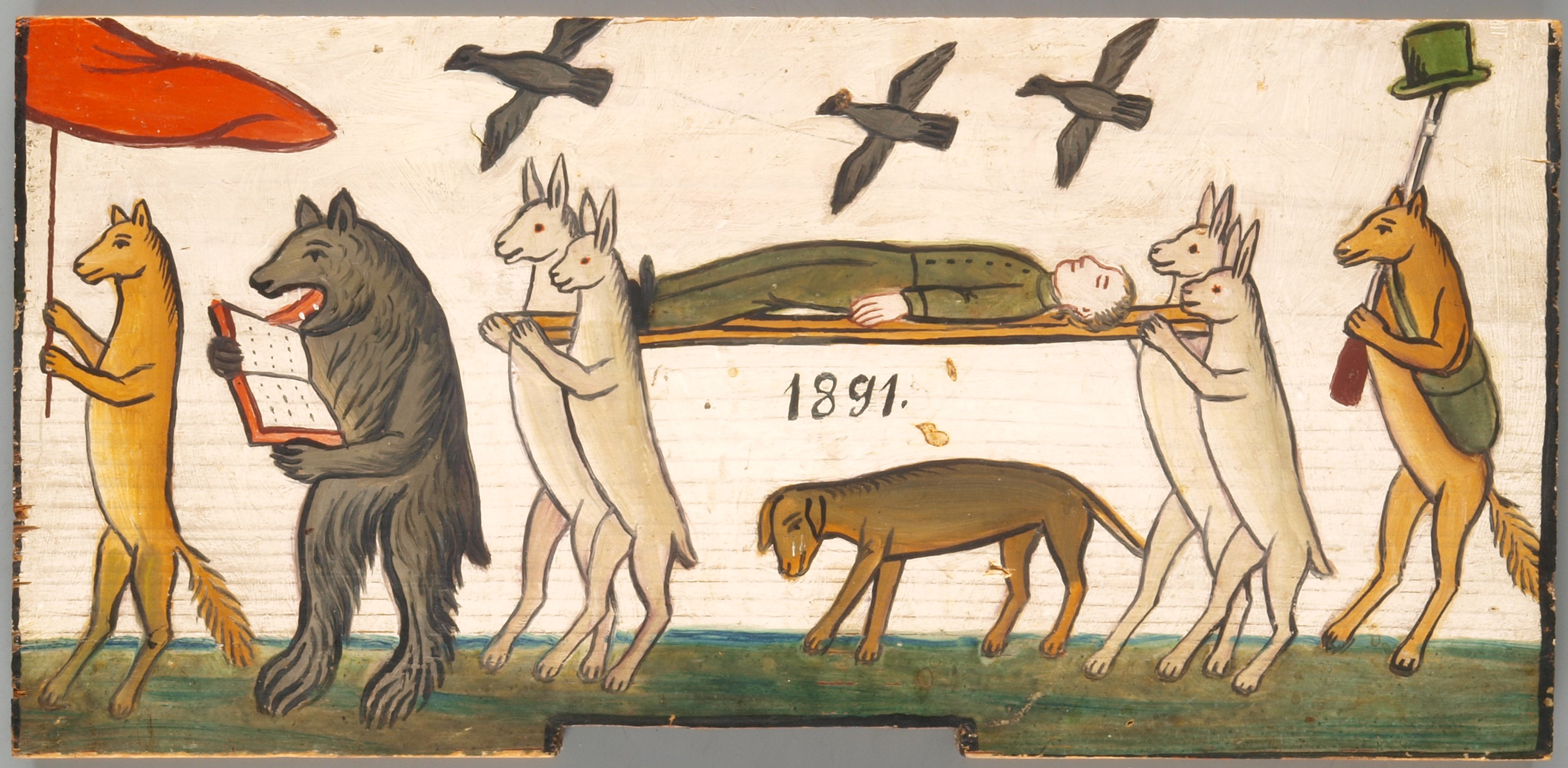
Hunter's funeral (beehive panel)

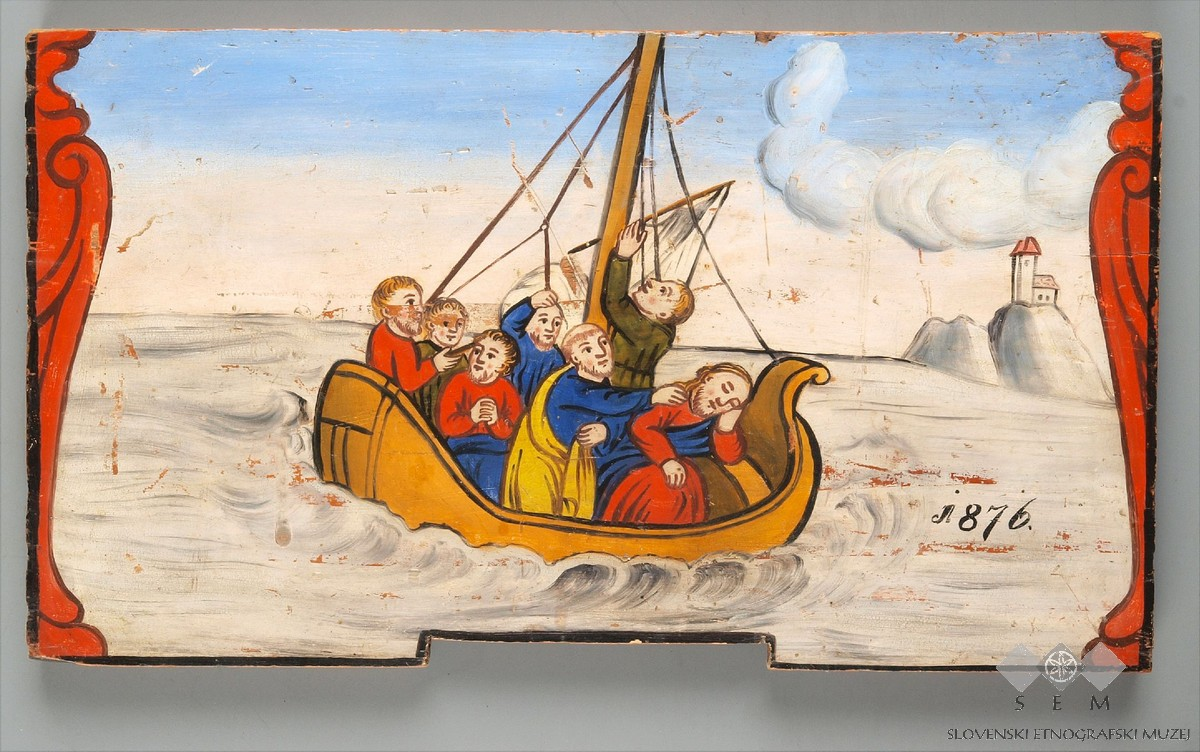
Jesus Calms the Storm on the Sea of Galilee (beehive panel)

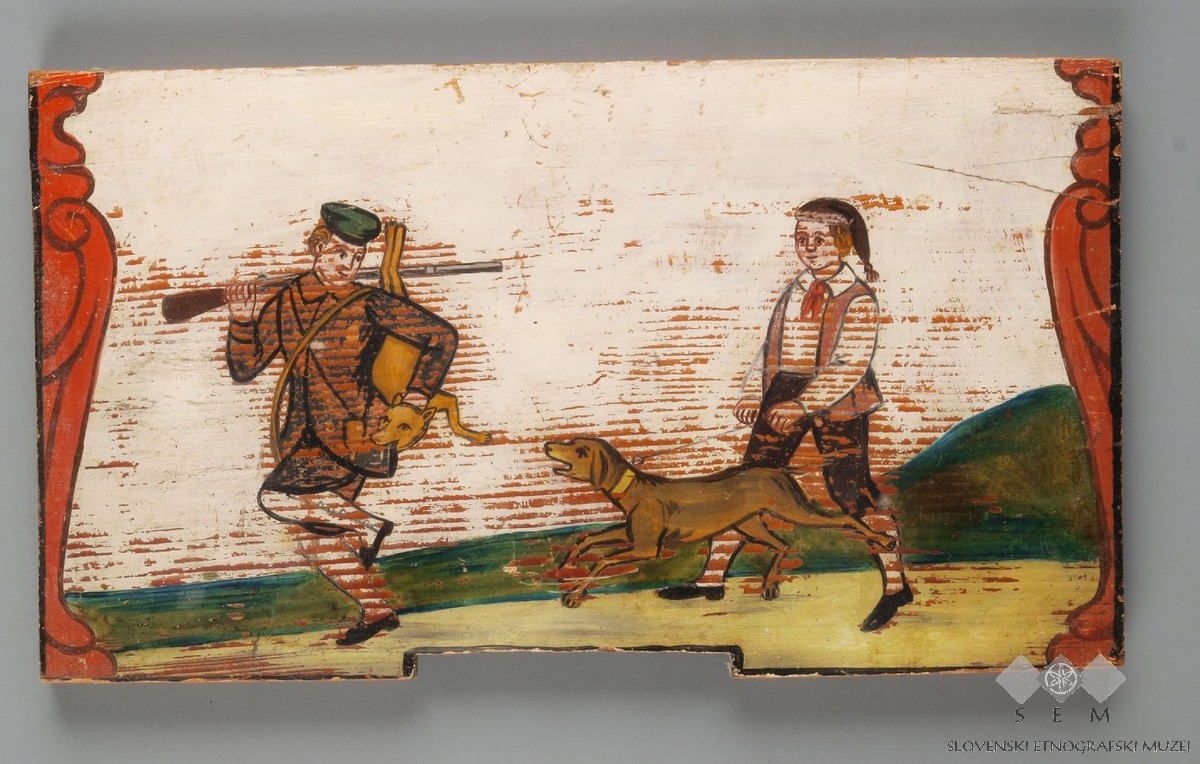
Hunting scene (beehive panel)

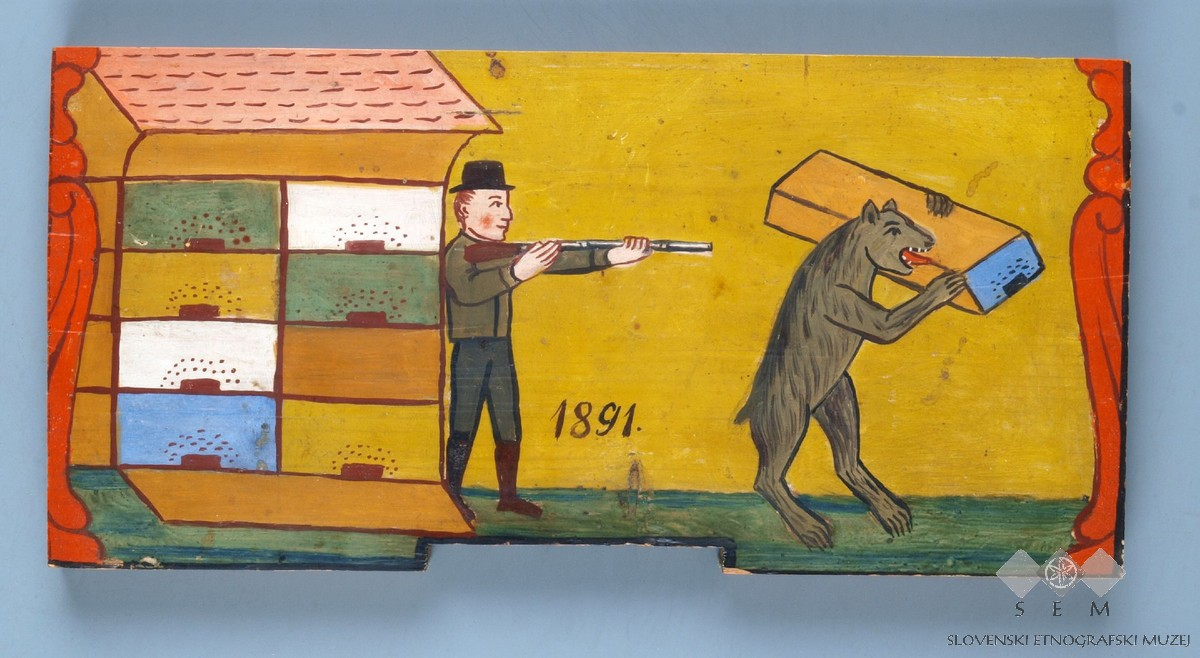
Beekeeper shoots at a bear (beehive panel)
