= Rovte v Selški Dolini =

Rovte v Selški Dolini Rovte (until 1955)
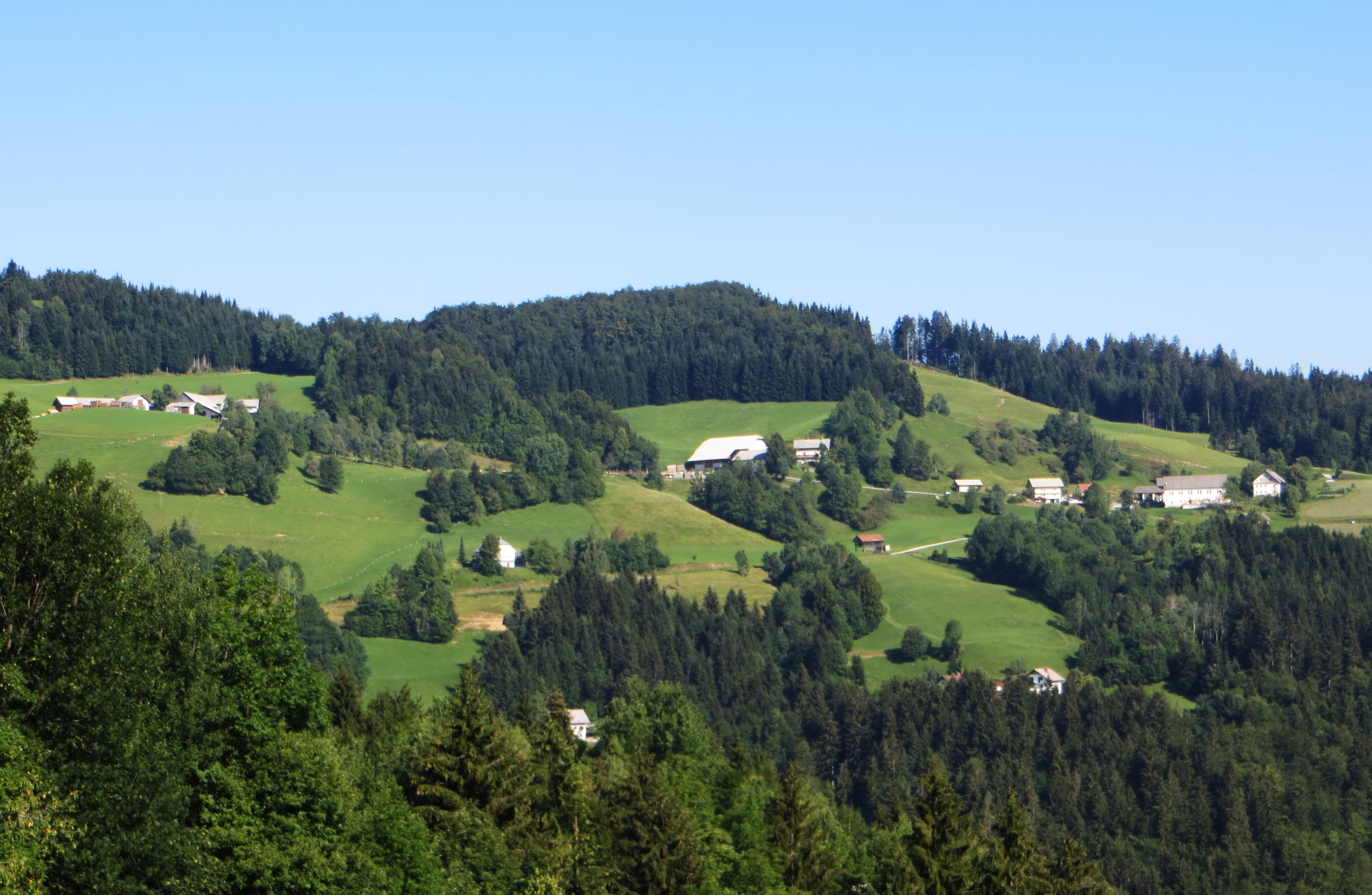

- Location in Slovenia
- Coordinates: 46°11′17.07″N 14°10′42.28″E
- Country: Slovenia
- Traditional region: Upper Carniola
- Statistical region: Upper Carniola
- Municipality: Škofja Loka

Area
  - Total: 2.87 km^{2} (1.11 sq mi)
- Elevation: 877.2 m (2,878 ft)

Population (2002)
  - Total: 54

Rovte v Selški Dolini (pronounced [ˈɾoːu̯tɛ ʍ ˈseːu̯ʃki dɔˈliːni]; Slovene: Rovte v Selški dolini, in older sources also Rovte pri Svetem Lenartu, German: Rovte bei Sankt Leonhard) is a settlement in the Municipality of Škofja Loka in the Upper Carniola region of Slovenia.

== Name ==
The name of the settlement was changed from Rovte to Rovte v Selški dolini (literally, 'Rovte in the Selca Valley') in 1955. In the past the German name was Rovte bei Sankt Leonhard (literally, 'Rovte near Sveti Lenart').
