= Spodnja Dobrava, Radovljica =

Spodnja Dobrava
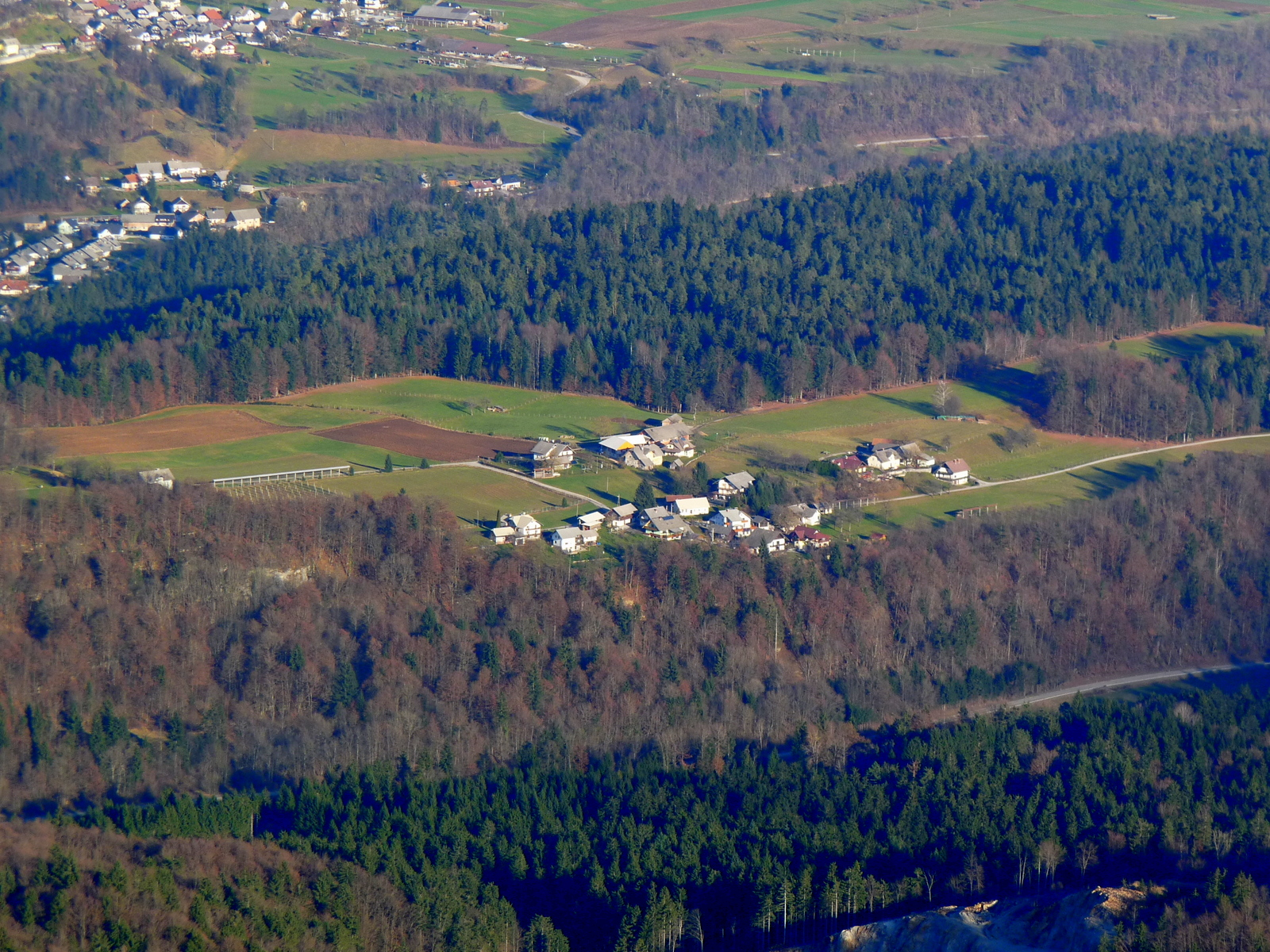

- Location in Slovenia
- Coordinates: 46°18′4.81″N 14°13′39.4″E
- Country: Slovenia
- Region: Upper Carniola
- Statistical region: Upper Carniola
- Municipality: Radovljica
- Elevation: 480.7 m (1,577 ft)

Population (2002)
  - Total: 50

Spodnja Dobrava (pronounced [ˈspoːdnja dɔˈbɾaːʋa]) is a village in the Municipality of Radovljica in the Upper Carniola region of Slovenia. It has a population of 50.

== Name ==
Spodnja Dobrava was attested in written sources as Hard in 1368, and as Niderhard and Nadabra in 1498. The name Spodnja Dobrava literally means 'lower Dobrava' and reflects its elevation contrast with neighboring Srednja Dobrava (literally, 'middle Dobrava', about 18 meters or 59 feet higher) and Zgornja Dobrava (literally, 'upper Dobrava', about 28 meters or 92 feet higher). The place name Dobrava is relatively frequent in Slovenia. It is derived from the Slovene common noun dobrava 'gently rolling partially wooded land' (and archaically 'woods, grove'). The name therefore refers to the local geography.
