= Selca, Železniki =

Selca
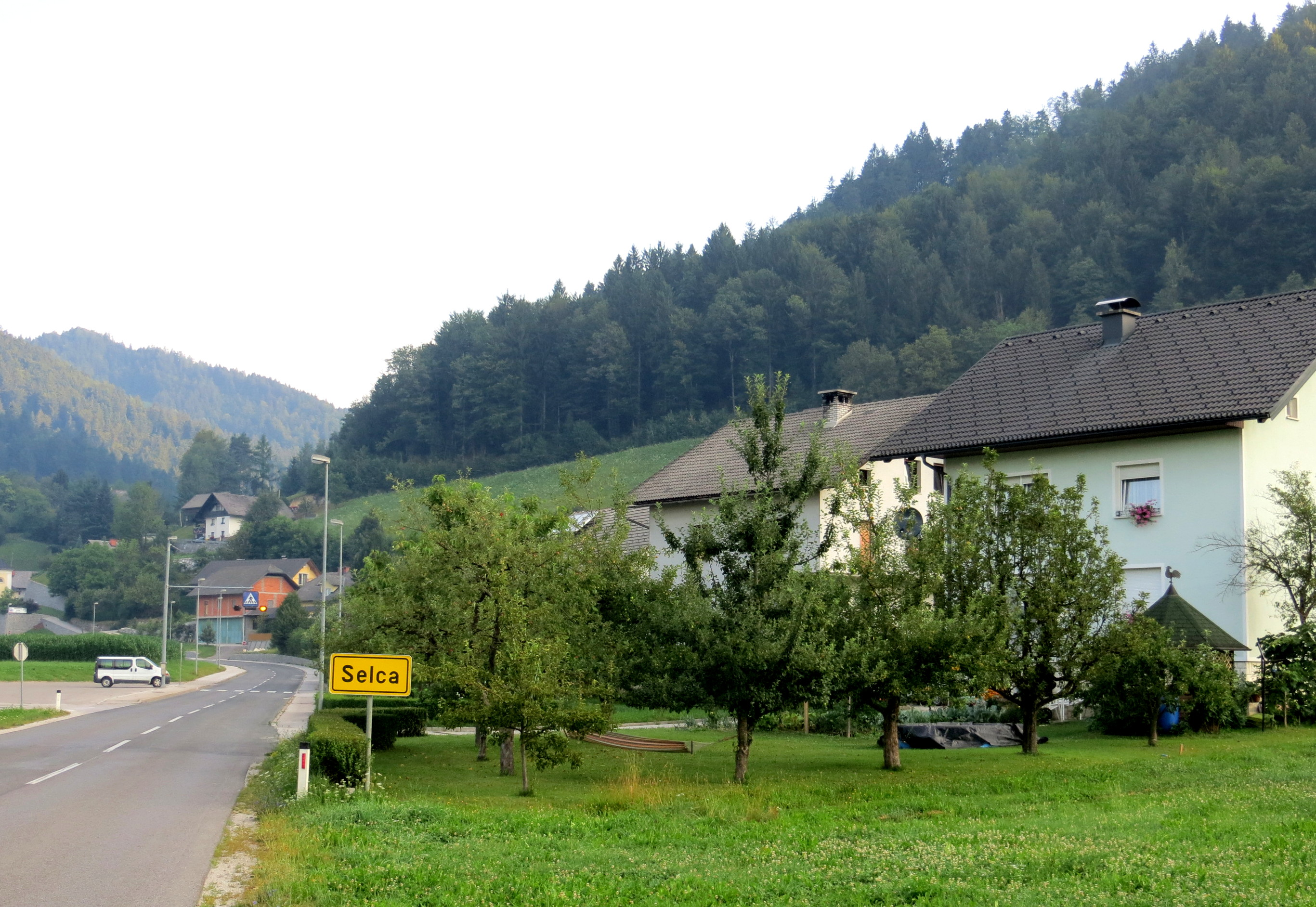

- Location in Slovenia
- Coordinates: 46°13′28.44″N 14°11′54.06″E
- Country: Slovenia
- Traditional Region: Upper Carniola
- Statistical region: Upper Carniola
- Municipality: Železniki

Area
  - Total: 6.204 km^{2} (2.395 sq mi)
- Elevation: 449 m (1,473 ft)

Population (2026)
  - Total: 705
  - Density: 114/km^{2} (300/sq mi)

Selca (pronounced [ˈseːu̯tsa]; in older sources also Selce, German: Selzach) is a village in the Municipality of Železniki in the Upper Carniola region of Slovenia. In January 2026, the population was 705.

== History ==
It is an old settlement, first mentioned in 973 AD, and was formerly the main settlement and center for the entire Selca Valley (Slovene: Selška dolina), which was named after the village. Only in more recent times did Železniki become the administrative center for the area.

== Churches ==
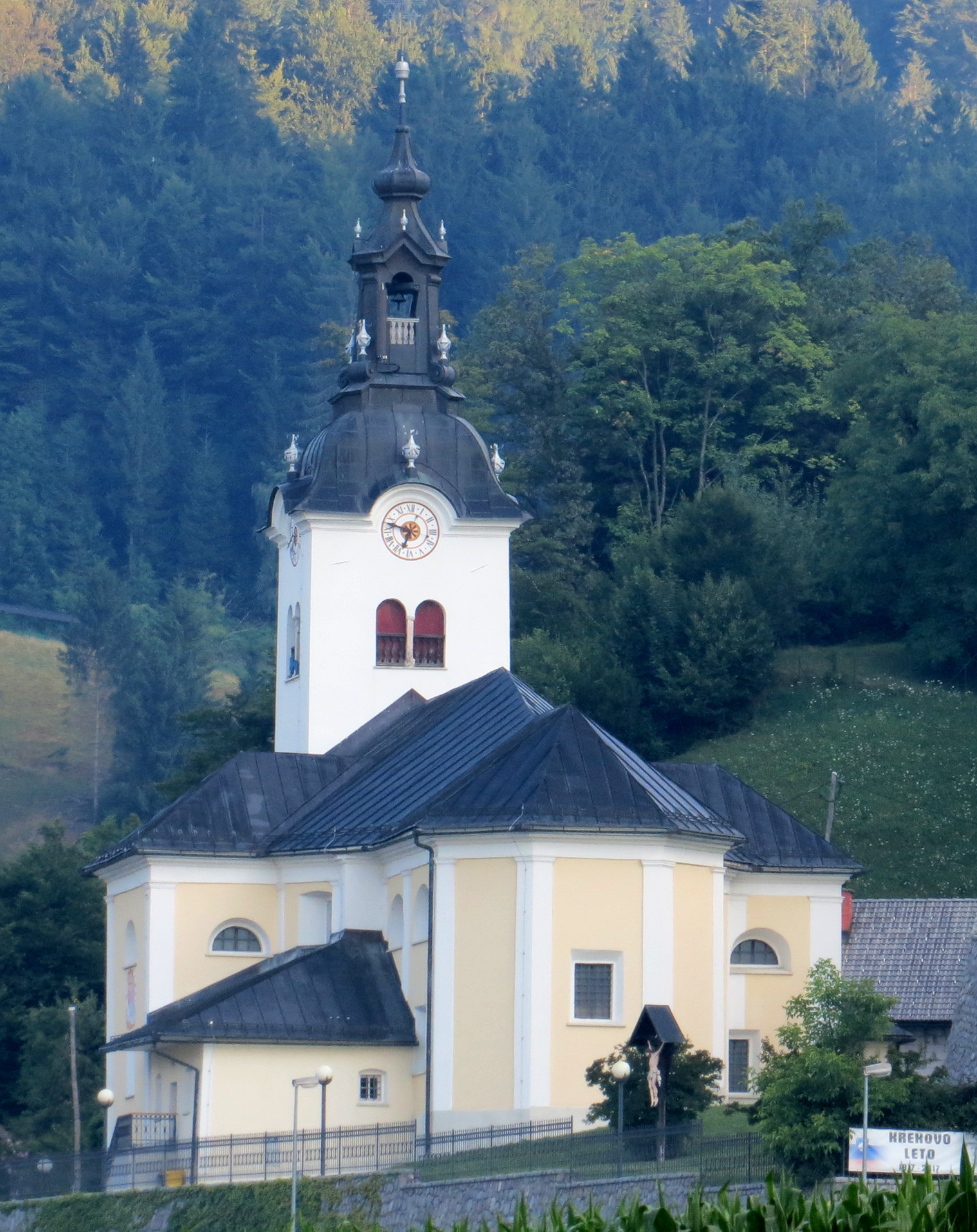
Saint Peter's Church

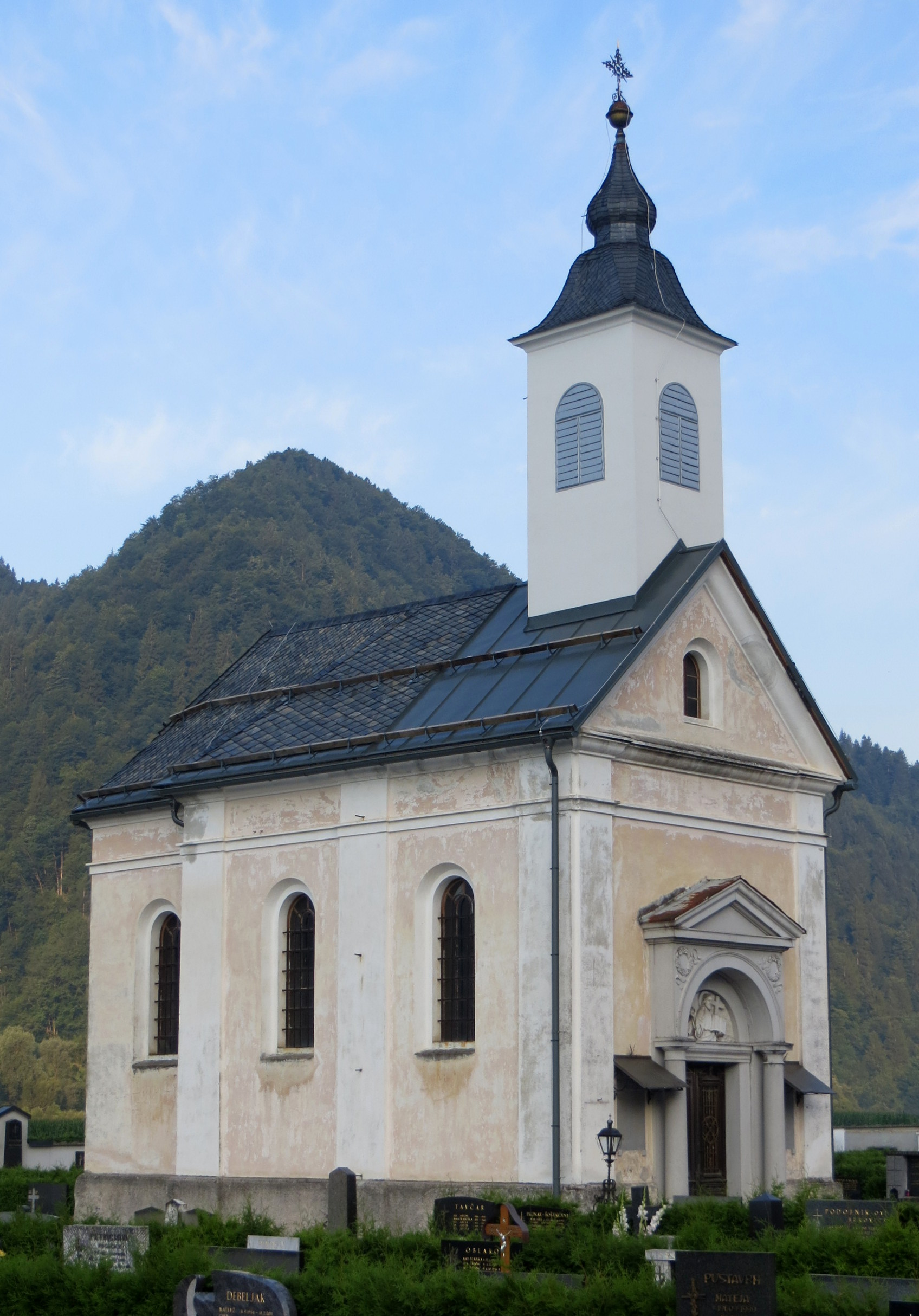
Feast of the Cross Church

Churches in Selca

The Baroque parish church in Selca is dedicated to Saint Peter. It belongs to the Archdiocese of Ljubljana. A second church, built just outside the village at the cemetery, is dedicated to the Feast of the Cross.

== Notable people ==
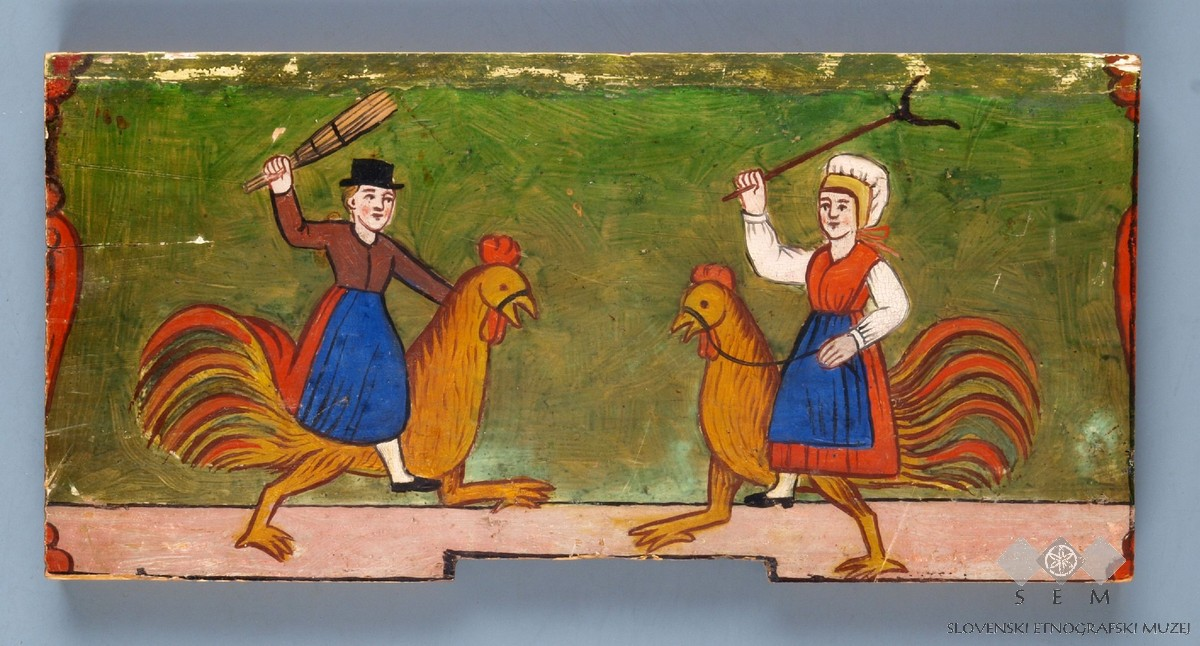
Duel between the Carinthian Woman and the Carniolan Woman (beehive panel) by Micka Pavlič

Notable people that were born or lived in Selca include the following:

- Micka Pavlič (1821–1891), Slovenian folk artist
