= Jožef Pogačnik =

Slovenian politician (1866–1932)

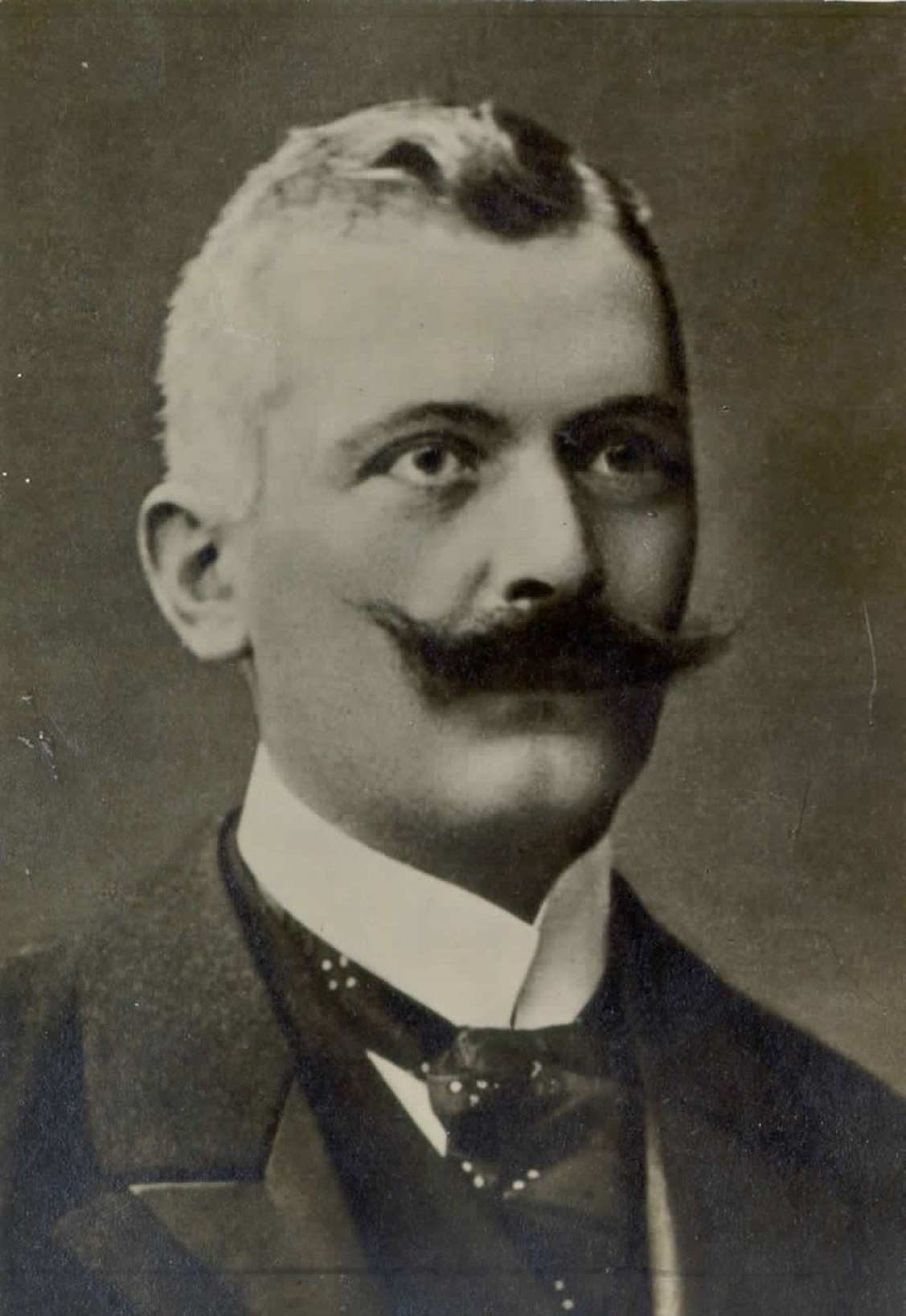

Prime Minister of Slovenes
- In office October 31, 1918 – January 20, 1919
- Monarch: Peter I

Personal details
- Born: October 19, 1866 Podnart, Austrian Empire (now Slovenia)
- Died: August 18, 1932 (aged 65)
- Party: Slovene People's Party

Jožef Pogačnik (October 19, 1866 in Podnart – August 18, 1932) was a Slovenian politician who served as Prime Minister of Slovenes within the Kingdom of Serbs, Croats and Slovenes from October 31, 1918, to January 20, 1919, under the reign of Peter I. He was a member of the Slovene People's Party.
