= Iztok Jarc =

Slovenian diplomat and politician

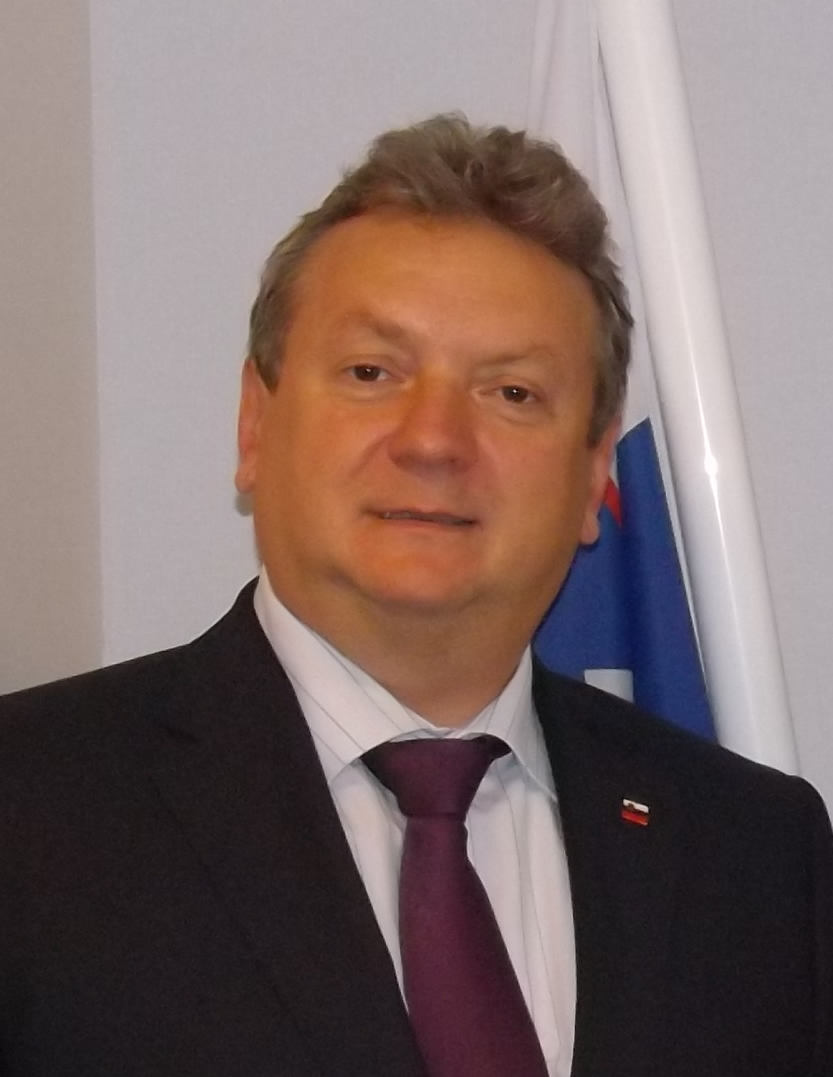
Jarc in 2012

Iztok Jarc (born 21 August 1963) is a Slovenian diplomat and politician. From 2007 to 2008 he served as Minister of Agriculture of Slovenia. He was serving as an ambassador of Slovenia in the United Kingdom from 2008 to 2013.

== Early life and career ==
Jarc was born in the town of Novo Mesto, but spent most of his youth in the nearby Lower Carniolan village of Prečna, where his parents worked as farmers. He attended grammar school in Novo Mesto, enrolling in the University of Ljubljana in 1982. He studied at the Faculty of Social Sciences graduating from international relations in 1987.

In 1989 Jarc got employed at the Secretariat for International Collaboration of the Socialist Republic of Slovenia. After the victory of the DEMOS coalition on the first democratic elections in Slovenia in April 1990, Dimitrij Rupel became head of the secretariat, gradually transforming it into a ministry of foreign affairs of Slovenia which was starting its process of secession from Yugoslavia. Jarc had an important role in this process which ended in the international recognition of Slovenian independence in 1992. In 1993, Jarc shortly moved to Brussels and got employed as an advisor to the European Commission, in the General Directorate for the Policy on Small and Medium Enterprises. At the end of the same year he got employed as an expert on the Slovenian Ministry for Economic Relations and Development.

In 1996, Jarc became the chief advisor for economic issues in the Slovenian Mission at the European Union in Brussels, where he remained until 2000, when he became the chairman of the Sector for European Integration and Economic Relations in the Slovenian Foreign Ministry. The same year, he was named by the Slovenian government led by Andrej Bajuk as member of the negotiation group for Slovenian entry in the European Union. In 2001, he was named Secretary General of the Ministry of Agriculture, which he remained until 2004, when he became the Slovenian ambassador to Israel.

In 2007, after the resignation of Minister of Agriculture Marija Lukačič, Jarc was named as the new Minister of Agriculture of Slovenia in the centre-right cabinet led by Janez Janša. In the parliamentary elections of 2008, he did run on the list of any political party and instead chose to get back into diplomacy. Following the victory of the centre-left coalition led by Borut Pahor, Jarc was replaced as Minister of Agriculture by Milan Pogačnik.

In December 2008, after several months of delay, he was appointed by President Danilo Türk as ambassador to the United Kingdom.

Since December 2008, Jarc is the president of the Committee for Agriculture in the Expert Council of the Slovenian Democratic Party, the current shadow cabinet in Slovenia.

Political offices
Preceded by Marija Lukačič	Minister of Agriculture, Forestry, and Nutrition; 2007-2008	Succeeded by Milan Pogačnik

== See also ==
- Foreign relations of Slovenia
- Politics of Slovenia

== Sources ==
- Biography on the Slovenian Government webpage
- Profile of Iztok Jarc on the webportal 24ur.com
