= Stane Granda =

Slovene historian (born 1948)

- Born: April 8, 1948 (age 78); Novo Mesto, Slovenia
- Occupation: Historian

Stane Granda (born April 8, 1948) is a Slovene historian.

Granda was born in Novo Mesto. He received a bachelor's degree in history from the University of Ljubljana's Faculty of Arts in 1973. From 1973 to 1979 he worked at the Institute of Contemporary History, and since then has worked at the Milko Kos Historical Institute at the Slovenian Academy of Sciences and Arts. He primarily studies rural history and the effects of the Revolutions of 1848 in Slovenian territory.

In January 2006, Granda was selected to head the programming management board at the broadcaster RTV Slovenija.

== Selected works ==
- Dolenjska v revolucionarnem letu 1848/49 (Lower Carniola in the Revolutionary Year 1848/49; Novo Mesto, 1995, ISBN 961-6000-53-5)
- Prva odločitev Slovencev za Slovenijo: dokumenti z uvodno študijo in osnovnimi pojasnili (The First Decision by the Slovenians for Slovenia: Documents with an Introductory Study and Basic Explanations; Ljubljana, 1999, ISBN 961-6017-84-5)
- Novo mesto (Novo Mesto, revised edition; Novo Mesto, 2007, ISBN 978-961-6421-56-0)
- Slovenia: An Historical Overview (Ljubljana, 2008, ISBN 978-961-6435-47-5)
- Slovenija: pogled na njeno zgodovino (Slovenia: A View of Its History; Ljubljana, 2008, ISBN 978-961-6435-49-9)
- Mala zgodovina Slovenije (A Brief History of Slovenia; Celje, 2008, ISBN 978-961-218-777-4)
