= Podnart =

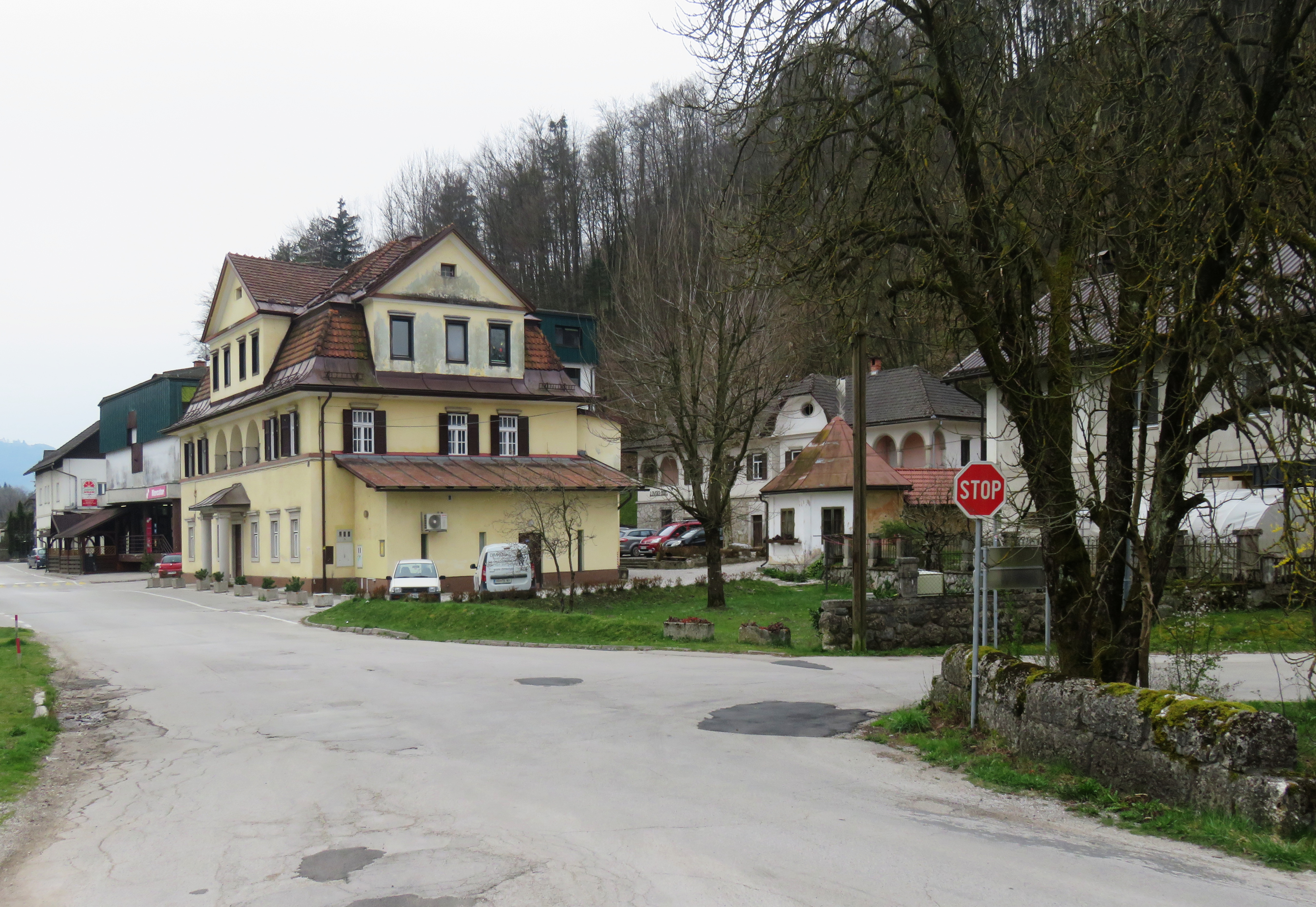

- Location in Slovenia
- Coordinates: 46°17′46.16″N 14°15′18.72″E
- Country: Slovenia
- Region: Upper Carniola
- Statistical region: Upper Carniola
- Municipality: Radovljica
- Elevation: 377.9 m (1,240 ft)

Population (2002)
  - Total: 337

Podnart (pronounced [pɔˈdnaɾt]) is a village in the Municipality of Radovljica in the Upper Carniola region of Slovenia.

== Name ==
Podnart was attested in written sources in 1763–87 as Podnart and Podnarth. The name is a fused prepositional phrase that has lost case inflection, from pod 'below' + nart 'end of a mountain chain, level area between mountains and a valley'. In this case, it refers to the settlement's location below the hills between the Sava River and Lipnica Creek. Lešnica Creek empties into the Sava opposite Podnart.

== Notable people ==
Notable people that were born or lived in Podnart include the following:

- Jožef Pogačnik (1866–1932), politician
