= Milan Pogačnik =

Slovenian politician

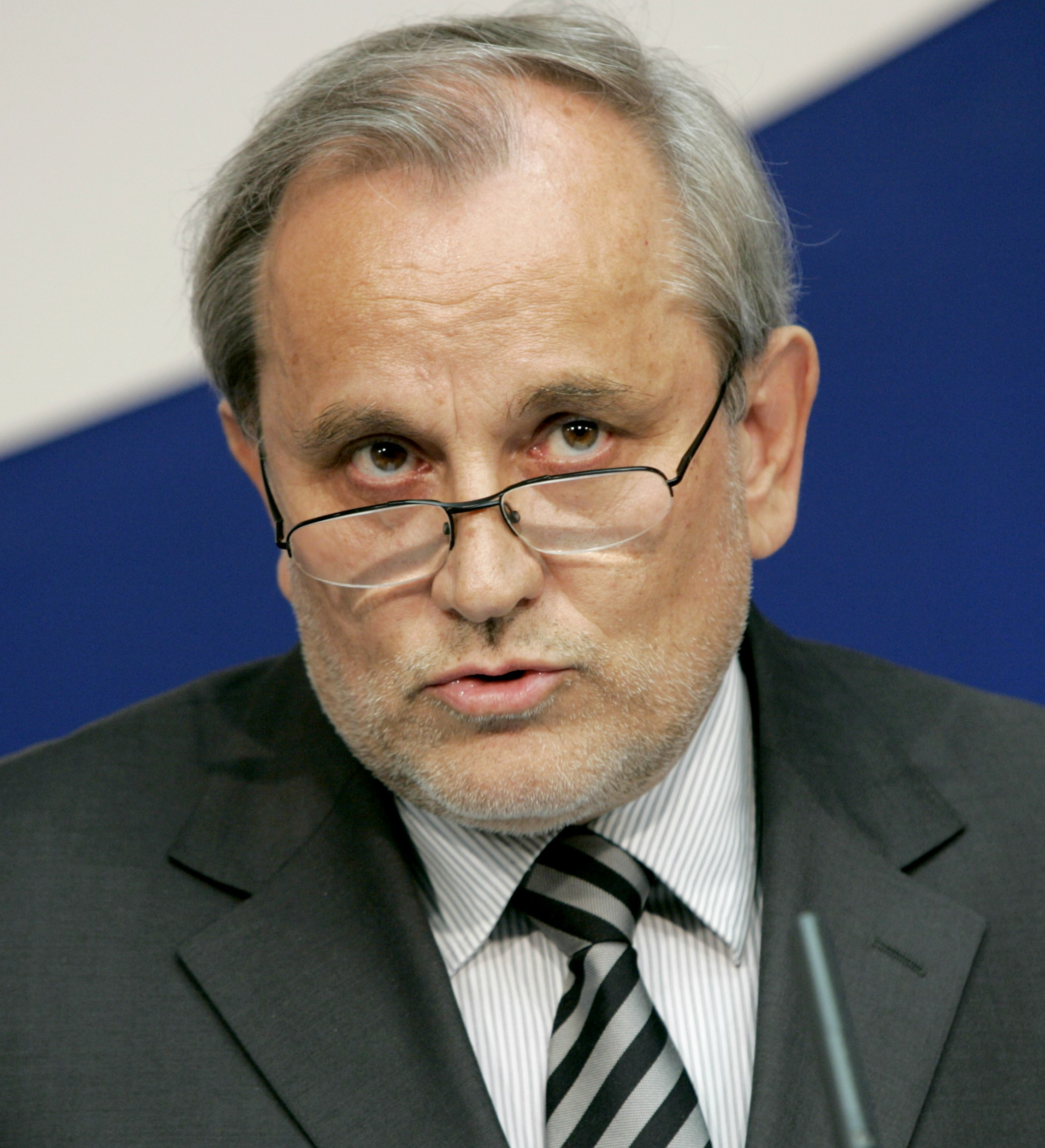

Milan Pogačnik (born 30 August 1946) is a Slovenian politician. Between November 2008 and March 2010, he served as the Minister of Agriculture, Forestry and Nutrition of Slovenia.

== Biography ==
Pogačnik was born in Celje, then part of the People's Republic of Slovenia in the Federal People's Republic of Yugoslavia. He studied veterinary medicine at the University of Ljubljana, graduating in 1971. He obtained his PhD in 1984. Between 1990 and 2008, he served as dean of the Veterinary Faculty at the University of Ljubljana.

== Career ==
Between 1994 and 1998, he served as member of the Council for Higher Education of the Republic of Slovenia, and between 1999 and 2002 as member of the Slovenian Council for Science and Technology; both are advisory organs to the Government of Slovenia. Between 2000 and 2003 he served as head of the National Veterinary Institute, and between 2002 and 2004, he chaired the Council for Veterinary Policies within the Ministry of Agriculture, Forestry and Nutrition. Between 2003 and 2008, he was member of the Scientific and Advisory Board of Joint Research Centre of the European Center for the Validation of Alternative Methods within the European Commission. Between 2007 and 2008, he served in the Management Board of the European Food Safety Authority.

Pogačnik first entered the Slovenian political scene in 2000, when the Prime Minister Janez Drnovšek proposed him as the candidate for Minister of Agriculture after the Slovenian People's Party left the governing coalition. However, Drnovšek's government fell before Pogačnik could be confirmed in the Parliament. In April 2004, after the Slovenian People's Party again left the government, the Prime Minister Anton Rop appointed him as Minister of Agriculture. In the 2004 Slovenian parliamentary election, Pogačnik ran unsuccessfully for Parliament on the list of the Liberal Democracy of Slovenia. The elections was won by the conservative opposition, and Pogačnik was replaced by the Democratic politician Marija Lukačič.

In the parliamentary election of 2008, Pogačnik ran as a candidate of the opposition Social Democrats. After the election, he was appointed as Minister of Agriculture in the government of Borut Pahor. In early 2010, Pozareport.si, and then other media, revealed a series of irregularities regarding the Ministry of Agriculture's handling of the cases of removal and returning of dogs, which upon return killed their owner. Articles revealed close ties between the ministry officials and the dog owner. Among other information, media published photos from the crime scene of the morning after the dog owner's death, showing Ministry of Agriculture State Secretary Sonja Bukovec crying and hugging sister of the dogs owner. In the parliament, a motion of no confidence (called interpellation in Slovenia) was initiated against Pogačnik for numerous irregularities in the events related to these dogs and he resigned.

== Charges of corruption ==
In February and March 2010, Pogačnik was reported by the media to be involved in different corruption scandals. The opposition parties started an interpellation motion against him regarding the return of two dogs to the physician Saša Baričevič. However, on 9 March 2010, before the charges against him were discussed in the National Assembly, he was arrested by the Slovenian Police for questioning regarding dodgy land deals and trading of favours with the Slovenian National Party (SNS) leader Zmago Jelinčič. It was reported that Pogačnik was trying to secure the support of Jelinčič's party for a key farmland law and in the no-confidence vote against him in return for securing land for a national aviation museum near Murska Sobota (northeastern Slovenia) that Jelinčič was lobbying for. The following day, 10 March 2010, he stepped down as the Minister of Agriculture. On 29 March 2010, he was temporarily replaced by Henrik Gjerkeš, who was also the Minister of Local Self-Government and Regional Development at the time. In May 2010, Dejan Židan was named the new Minister of Agriculture. In October 2010, a complaint was filed against Pogačnik by the Koper criminal police.

Political offices
Preceded by Franci But	Minister of Agriculture, Forestry, and Nutrition; April 2000–November 2000	Succeeded by Marija Lukačič
Preceded by Iztok Jarc	Minister of Agriculture, Forestry, and Nutrition; November 2008–March 2010	Succeeded by Dejan Židan
