= Jamnik, Kranj =

Jamnik
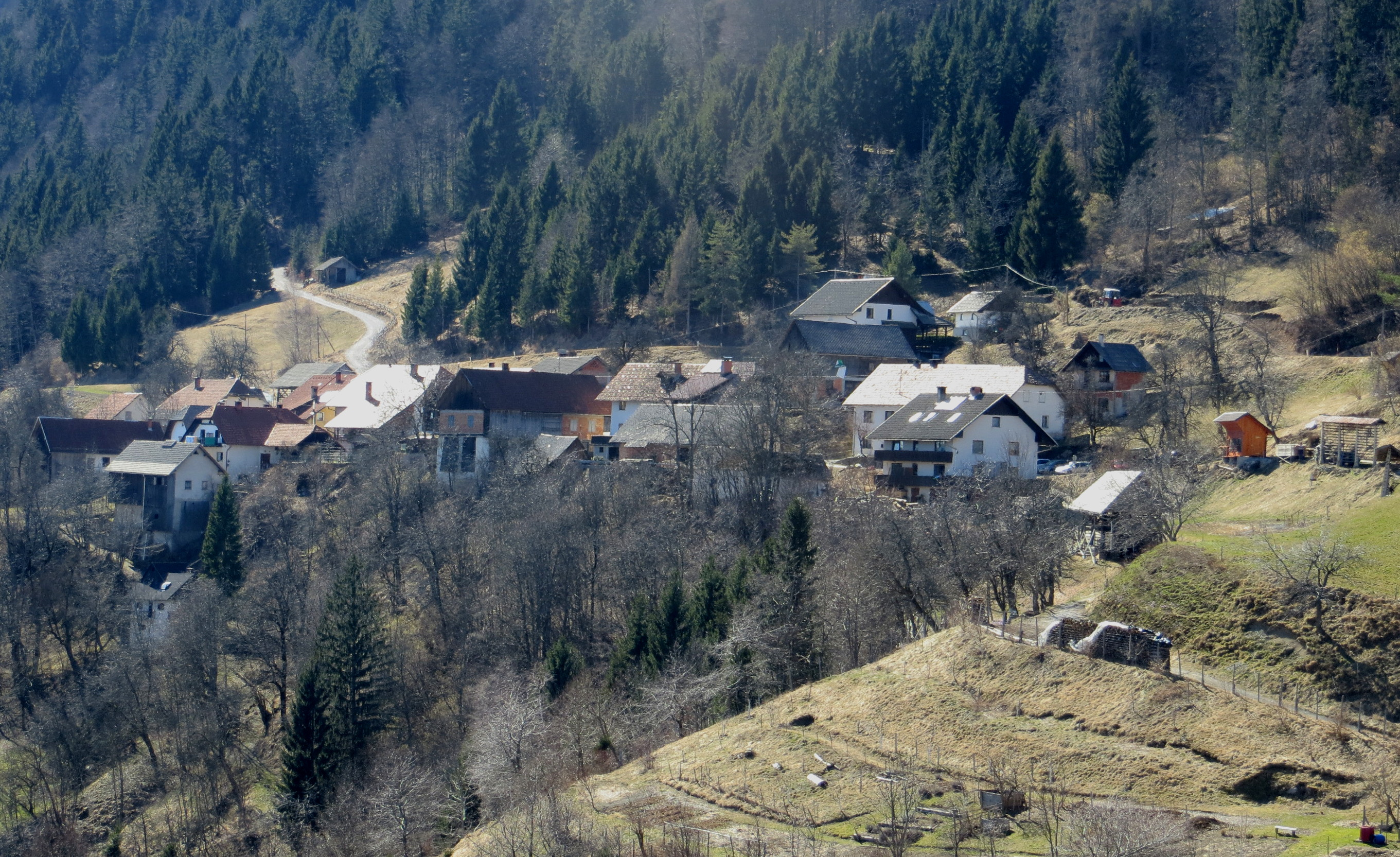

- Location in Slovenia
- Coordinates: 46°16′15.5″N 14°12′25.31″E
- Country: Slovenia
- Traditional region: Upper Carniola
- Statistical region: Upper Carniola
- Municipality: Kranj

Area
  - Total: 4.76 km^{2} (1.84 sq mi)
- Elevation: 830.2 m (2,724 ft)

Population (2002)
  - Total: 42

Jamnik (pronounced [ˈjaːmnik]) is a settlement on the eastern slopes of the Jelovica Plateau in the Municipality of Kranj in the Upper Carniola region of Slovenia.

== Church ==
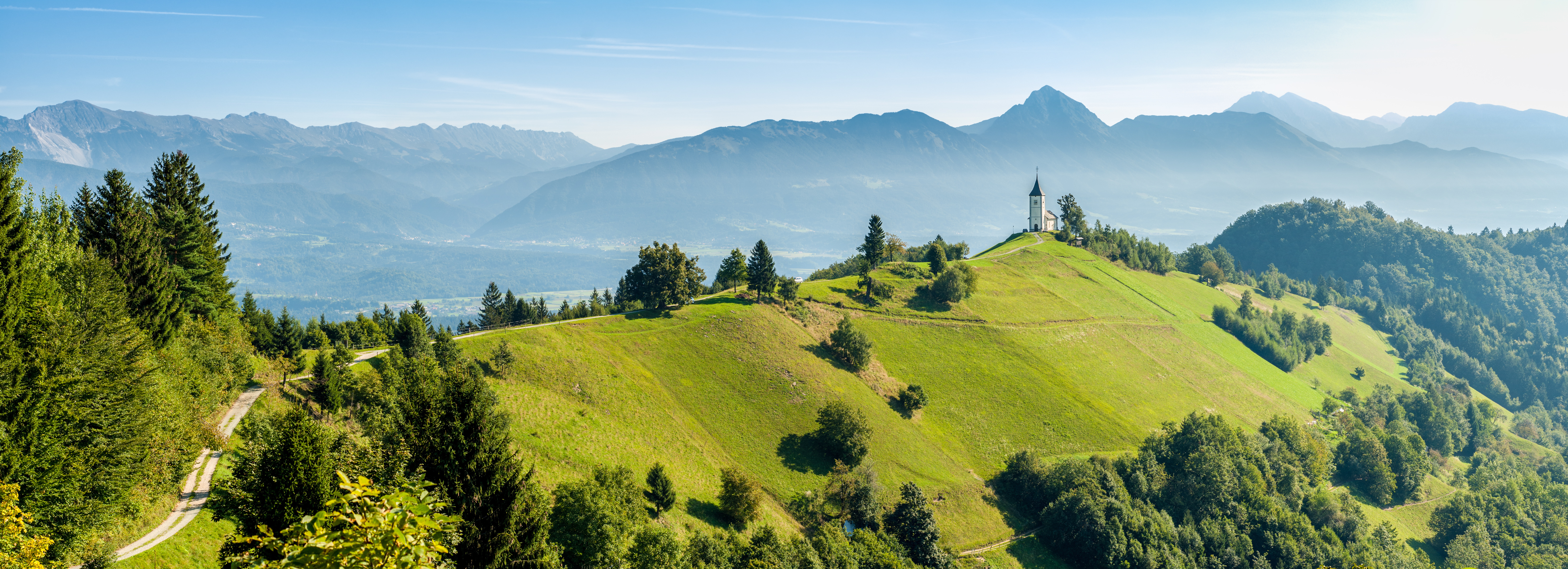
Saints Primus and Felician Church

The local church just outside the village, dedicated to Saints Primus and Felician, is built at an impressive location on a hill overlooking most of the northern part of the Ljubljana Basin with the Julian Alps as a backdrop towards the northwest and the Kamnik–Savinja Alps towards the east.
