= Jelovica =

Plateau in Slovenia

Coordinates: 46°18′5″N 14°7′49″E

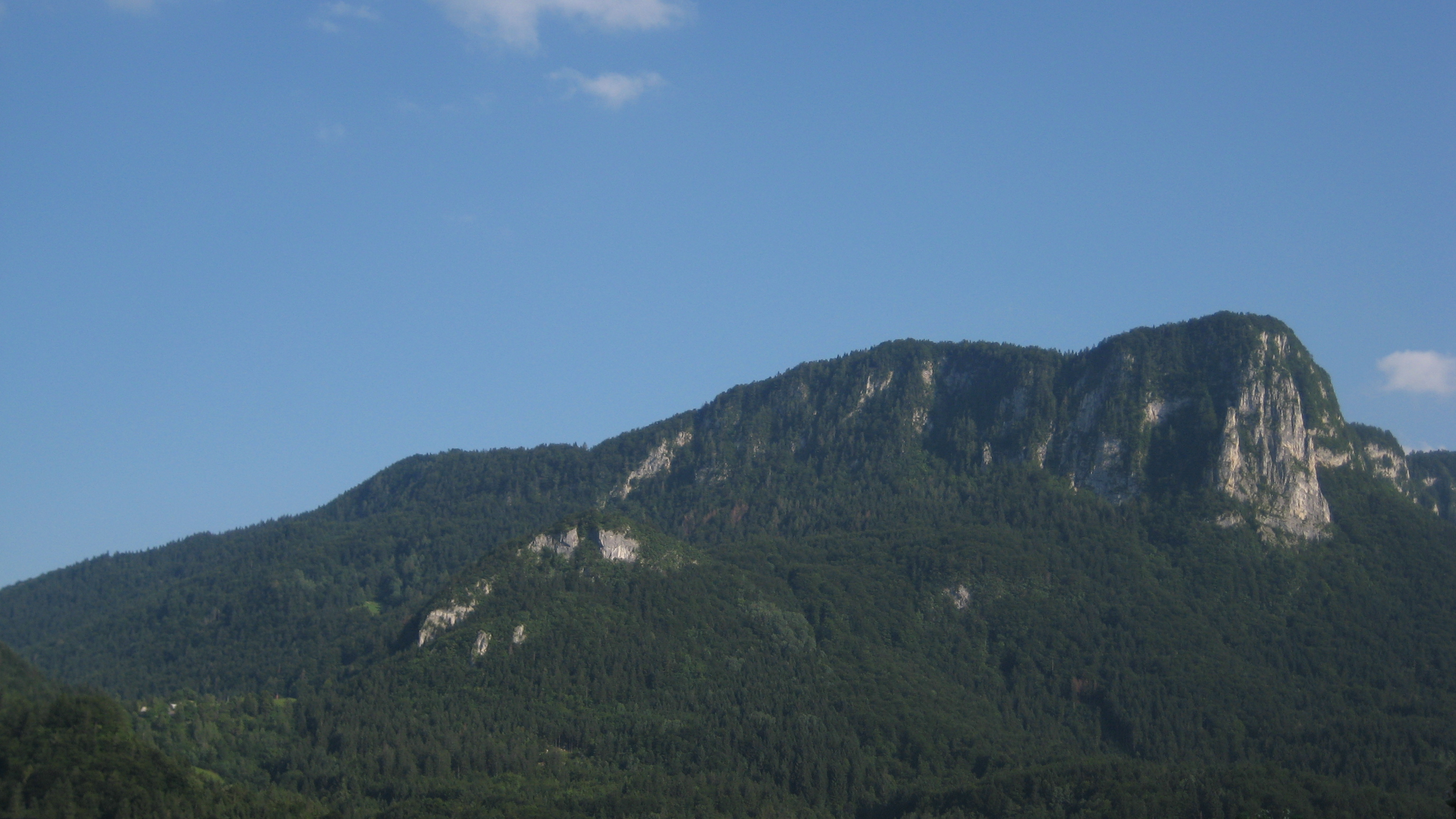
Northern foot of Jelovica, with the rocky Hag's Tooth (Babji zob) visible at its right side

Jelovica (pronounced [jɛˈlɔːʋitsa]) is a karst plateau in northwestern Slovenia. It is the easternmost part of the Julian Alps and is overgrown by spruce forest.

Partisan Peak (Slovene: Partizanski vrh), originally known as Mount Kotlič, located on the southern part of the plateau, is its highest peak and reaches an elevation of 1,411 metres (4,629 ft). The northern part of the plateau has elevations up to 1,100 metres (3,600 ft).

Iron ore was once mined in Jelovica. During World War II, Jelovica served as a refuge for the Slovene Partisans. Today, it is a protected area within the Natura 2000 network.
