= List of cities, towns, and villages in Slovenia: L =

This is a list of cities, towns, and villages in Slovenia, starting with L.

| Settlement | Municipality |
|---|---|
| Labinje | Cerkno |
| Labor | Koper |
| Lačaves | Ormož |
| Lačja vas | Nazarje |
| Lačna Gora | Oplotnica |
| Ladja | Medvode |
| Ladra | Kobarid |
| Lahomno | Laško |
| Lahomšek | Laško |
| Lahonci | Ormož |
| Lahov Graben | Laško |
| Lahovče | Cerklje na Gorenjskem |
| Lahovna | Celje |
| Lahovo | Bloke |
| Lajše | Gorenja vas-Poljane |
| Lajše | Železniki |
| Lancova vas | Videm |
| Lancovo | Radovljica |
| Landek | Vojnik |
| Landol | Postojna |
| Lanišče | Škofljica |
| Laniše | Gorenja vas-Poljane |
| Laniše | Kamnik |
| Laporje | Slovenska Bistrica |
| Laporje | Velike Lašče |
| Laseno | Kamnik |
| Lasigovci | Dornava |
| Lastnič | Podčetrtek |
| Lastomerci | Gornja Radgona |
| Lašče | Borovnica |
| Lašče | Žužemberk |
| Laše | Šmarje pri Jelšah |
| Laška vas pri Štorah | Štore |
| Laška vas | Laško |
| Laški Rovt | Bohinj |
| Laško | Laško |
| Latkova vas | Prebold |
| Lavrica | Škofljica |
| Lavrovec | Logatec |
| Lavtarski Vrh | Kranj |
| Laze nad Krko | Ivančna Gorica |
| Laze pri Borovnici | Borovnica |
| Laze pri Boštanju | Sevnica |
| Laze pri Dolskem | Dol pri Ljubljani |
| Laze pri Domžalah | Domžale |
| Laze pri Dramljah | Šentjur |
| Laze pri Gobniku | Litija |
| Laze pri Gorenjem Jezeru | Cerknica |
| Laze pri Kostelu | Kostel |
| Laze pri Oneku | Kočevje |
| Laze pri Predgradu | Kočevje |
| Laze pri Vačah | Litija |
| Laze v Tuhinju | Kamnik |
| Laze | Brežice |
| Laze | Gorenja vas-Poljane |
| Laze | Logatec |
| Laze | Novo mesto |
| Laze | Velenje |
| Laze | Velike Lašče |
| Lazec | Cerkno |
| Lazec | Loški Potok |
| Lazina | Žužemberk |
| Laziše | Laško |
| Lazna | Nova Gorica |
| Laznica | Cerkno |
| Laznica | Maribor |
| Laže | Divača |
| Lažiše | Dobje |
| Ledeča vas | Šentjernej |
| Ledina | Sevnica |
| Ledine | Idrija |
| Ledinek | Sveta Ana (občina) |
| Ledinica | Žiri |
| Ledinske Krnice | Idrija |
| Legen | Slovenj Gradec |
| Lehen na Pohorju | Podvelka |
| Lekmarje | Šmarje pri Jelšah |
| Lemberg pri Novi Cerkvi | Vojnik |
| Lemberg pri Šmarju | Šmarje pri Jelšah |
| Lemerje | Puconci |
| Lenart nad Lušo | Škofja Loka |
| Lenart pri Gornjem Gradu | Gornji Grad |
| Lenart v Slovenskih Goricah | Lenart |
| Lendava | Lendava |
| Lendavske Gorice | Lendava |
| Lepa Njiva | Mozirje |
| Lepena | Bovec |
| Lepence | Bohinj |
| Lepi Vrh | Bloke |
| Lesce | Radovljica |
| Lesično | Kozje |
| Leskovca | Laško |
| Leskovec pri Krškem | Krško |
| Leskovec v Podborštu | Sevnica |
| Leskovec | Celje |
| Leskovec | Ivančna Gorica |
| Leskovec | Novo mesto |
| Leskovec | Slovenska Bistrica |
| Leskovica pri Šmartnem | Litija |
| Leskovica | Gorenja vas-Poljane |
| Lesno Brdo - del | Vrhnika |
| Lesno Brdo | Horjul |
| Lešane | Gornja Radgona |
| Leščevje | Ivančna Gorica |
| Leše | Litija |
| Leše | Prevalje |
| Leše | Tržič |
| Lešje | Majšperk |
| Lešje | Vojnik |
| Lešnica | Novo mesto |
| Lešnica | Ormož |
| Lešniški Vrh | Ormož |
| Lešnjake | Cerknica |
| Letenice | Kranj |
| Letuš | Braslovče |
| Levanjci | Destrnik |
| Levec | Žalec |
| Levič | Slovenska Bistrica |
| Levpa | Kanal |
| Levstiki | Ribnica |
| Libanja | Ormož |
| Libeliče | Dravograd |
| Libeliška Gora | Dravograd |
| Libelj | Krško |
| Liberga | Litija |
| Libna | Krško |
| Liboje | Žalec |
| Libušnje | Kobarid |
| Ličenca | Slovenske Konjice |
| Lig | Kanal |
| Limbarska Gora | Moravče |
| Limbuš | Maribor |
| Limovce | Vransko |
| Lindek | Vojnik |
| Lipa pri Frankolovem | Vojnik |
| Lipa | Beltinci |
| Lipa | Dobrepolje |
| Lipa | Lukovica |
| Lipa | Miren-Kostanjevica |
| Lipa | Zreče |
| Lipce | Jesenice |
| Lipe | Ljubljana |
| Lipica | Sežana |
| Lipica | Škofja Loka |
| Lipje | Velenje |
| Liplje | Kamnik |
| Liplje | Postojna |
| Lipni Dol | Laško |
| Lipnica | Radovljica |
| Lipnik | Trebnje |
| Lipoglav | Slovenske Konjice |
| Lipovci | Beltinci |
| Lipovec pri Kostelu | Kostel |
| Lipovec pri Škofji Vasi | Celje |
| Lipovec | Ribnica |
| Lipovec | Semič |
| Lipovec | Šmarje pri Jelšah |
| Lipovšica | Sodražica |
| Lipsenj | Cerknica |
| Lisec | Tolmin |
| Lisec | Trebnje |
| Lisjaki | Komen |
| Litija | Litija |
| Litmerk | Ormož |
| Livek | Kobarid |
| Livold | Kočevje |
| Livške Ravne | Kobarid |
| Ljubečna | Celje |
| Ljubež v Lazih | Litija |
| Ljubgojna | Horjul |
| Ljubično | Slovenska Bistrica |
| Ljubija | Mozirje |
| Ljubinj | Tolmin |
| Ljubljana | Ljubljana |
| Ljubnica | Vitanje |
| Ljubno ob Savinji | Ljubno |
| Ljubno | Radovljica |
| Ljubstava | Videm |
| Ljutomer | Ljutomer |
| Lobček | Grosuplje |
| Lobnica | Ruše |
| Loče | Brežice |
| Loče | Celje |
| Loče | Slovenske Konjice |
| Ločica ob Savinji | Polzela |
| Ločica pri Vranskem | Vransko |
| Ločič | Trnovska vas |
| Ločki Vrh | Benedikt |
| Ločki Vrh | Destrnik |
| Log Čezsoški | Bovec |
| Log nad Škofjo Loko | Škofja Loka |
| Log pod Mangartom | Bovec |
| Log pri Brezovici | Vrhnika |
| Log pri Mlinšah | Zagorje ob Savi |
| Log pri Polhovem Gradcu | Dobrova-Polhov Gradec |
| Log pri Vrhovem | Radeče |
| Log pri Žužemberku | Trebnje |
| Log v Bohinju | Bohinj |
| Log | Kranjska Gora |
| Log | Lukovica |
| Log | Rogatec |
| Log | Ruše |
| Log | Sevnica |
| Log | Trebnje |
| Logarji | Velike Lašče |
| Logarovci | Križevci |
| Logarska Dolina | Solčava |
| Logaršče | Tolmin |
| Logatec | Logatec |
| Logje | Kobarid |
| Lohača | Postojna |
| Loje | Tolmin |
| Loka pri Dobrni | Dobrna |
| Loka pri Framu | Rače-Fram |
| Loka pri Mengšu | Mengeš |
| Loka pri Zidanem Mostu | Sevnica |
| Loka pri Žusmu | Šentjur |
| Loka | Koper |
| Loka | Starše |
| Loka | Šentjernej |
| Loka | Tržič |
| Lokanja vas | Slovenska Bistrica |
| Lokarje | Šentjur |
| Lokavci | Gornja Radgona |
| Lokavec | Ajdovščina |
| Lokavec | Laško |
| Lokavec | Sveta Ana (občina) |
| Loke pri Mozirju | Mozirje |
| Loke pri Planini | Šentjur |
| Loke pri Zagorju | Zagorje ob Savi |
| Loke v Tuhinju | Kamnik |
| Loke | Krško |
| Loke | Nova Gorica |
| Loke | Novo mesto |
| Loke | Tabor (občina) |
| Lokev | Sežana |
| Lokovec | Nova Gorica |
| Lokovica | Prevalje |
| Lokovica | Šoštanj |
| Lokovina | Dobrna |
| Lokrovec | Celje |
| Lokve pri Dobrniču | Trebnje |
| Lokve | Črnomelj |
| Lokve | Krško |
| Lokve | Nova Gorica |
| Lokvica | Miren-Kostanjevica |
| Lom nad Volčo | Gorenja vas-Poljane |
| Lom pod Storžičem | Tržič |
| Lom | Mežica |
| Lomanoše | Gornja Radgona |
| Lome | Idrija |
| Lomno | Krško |
| Lončarjev Dol | Sevnica |
| Lončarovci | Moravske Toplice |
| Lopaca | Šentjur |
| Lopar | Koper |
| Lopata | Celje |
| Lopata | Žužemberk |
| Lopatnik pri Velenju | Velenje |
| Lopatnik | Velenje |
| Loperšice | Ormož |
| Lormanje | Lenart |
| Loška Gora pri Zrečah | Zreče |
| Loška Gora | Radeče |
| Loška vas | Dolenjske Toplice |
| Lovnik | Slovenska Bistrica |
| Lovranovo | Bloke |
| Lovrenc na Dravskem Polju | Kidričevo |
| Lovrenc na Pohorju | Lovrenc na Pohorju |
| Lovsko Brdo | Gorenja vas-Poljane |
| Lozice | Vipava |
| Lož | Loška Dolina |
| Ložane | Pesnica |
| Lože | Laško |
| Lože | Vipava |
| Ložec | Osilnica |
| Ložina | Podlehnik |
| Ložnica pri Žalcu | Žalec |
| Ložnica | Slovenska Bistrica |
| Ložnica | Velenje |
| Lucija | Piran |
| Lucova | Gornji Petrovci |
| Lučarjev Kal | Ivančna Gorica |
| Luče | Grosuplje |
| Luče | Luče |
| Lučine | Gorenja vas-Poljane |
| Ludranski Vrh | Črna na Koroškem |
| Lukačevci | Moravske Toplice |
| Lukanja | Slovenska Bistrica |
| Lukavci | Križevci |
| Lukežiči | Nova Gorica |
| Lukini | Koper |
| Lukovec | Komen |
| Lukovec | Litija |
| Lukovec | Sevnica |
| Lukovek | Trebnje |
| Lukovica pri Brezovici | Vrhnika |
| Lukovica pri Domžalah | Lukovica |
| Lunovec | Ormož |
| Lupinica | Litija |
| Lušečka vas | Slovenska Bistrica |
| Lutrje | Šentjur |
| Lutrško selo | Novo mesto |
| Lutverci | Gornja Radgona |
| Luža | Trebnje |
| Lužarji | Velike Lašče |
| Luže | Šenčur |
