= Spodnja Lipnica =

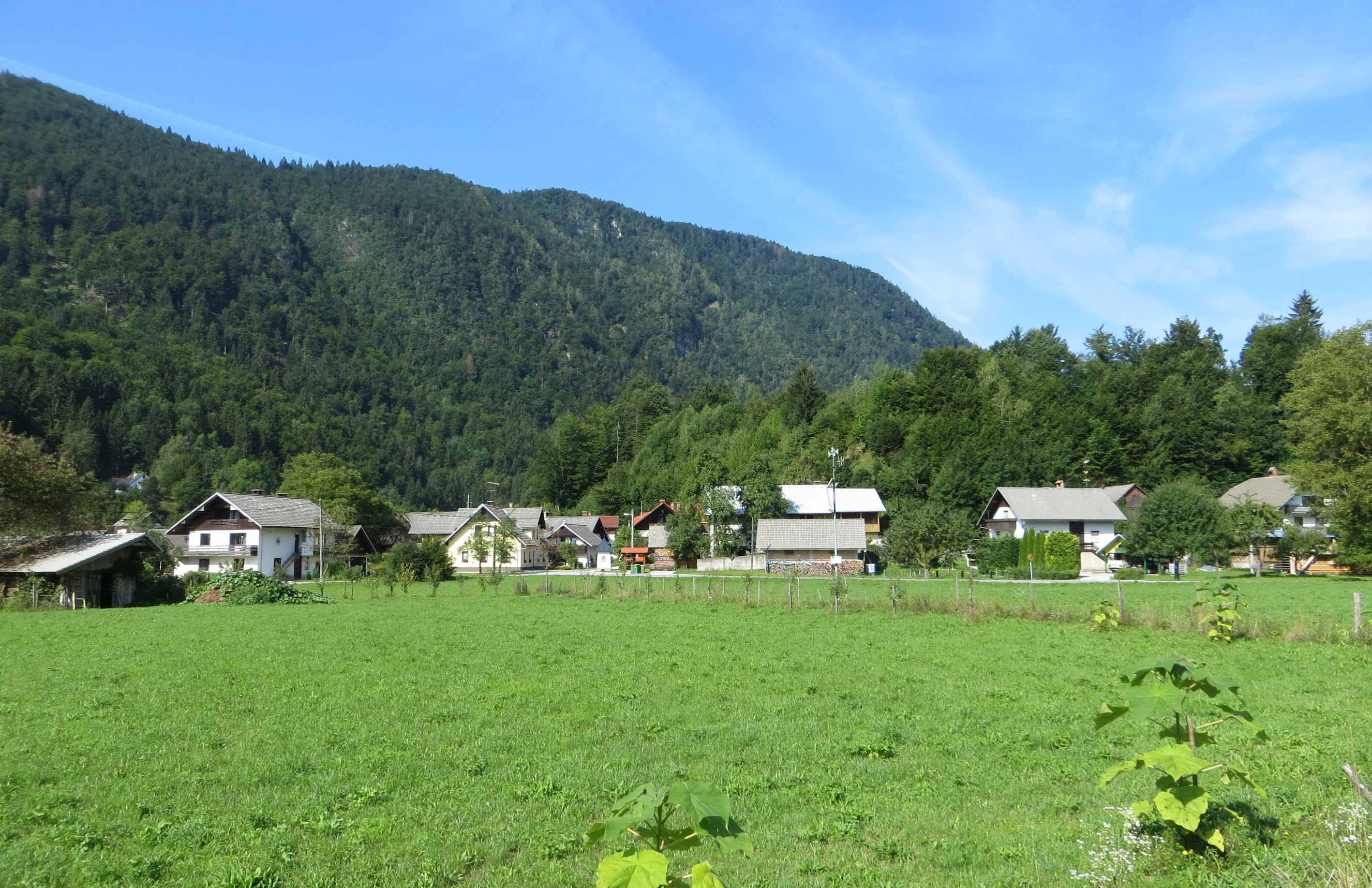

- Location in Slovenia
- Coordinates: 46°19′15.59″N 14°10′12.7″E
- Country: Slovenia
- Traditional region: Upper Carniola
- Statistical region: Upper Carniola
- Municipality: Radovljica
- Elevation: 482.5 m (1,583 ft)

Population (2017)
  - Total: 187

Spodnja Lipnica (pronounced [ˈspoːdnja ˈliːpnitsa]) is a village in the Municipality of Radovljica in the Upper Carniola region of Slovenia.

== Name ==
The name Spodnja Lipnica literally means 'lower Lipnica', distinguishing the village from neighboring Zgornja Lipnica (literally, 'upper Lipnica'), which stands at an elevation 29 meters (95 ft) higher. The name Lipnica, like related names (e.g., Lipa, Lipnik, Lipovec, etc.), is derived from the Slovene common noun lipa 'linden', referring to the local vegetation.

== Mass grave ==
Spodnja Lipnica is the site of a mass grave from the period immediately after the Second World War. The Sinkhole Cave Mass Grave (Slovene: Grobišče Jama za vrtcem) is located in the woods west of the settlement, in a cave 8 to 10 meters (26 to 33 ft) deep. It contained the remains of seven Slovene civilians from Radovljica that were murdered on May 29, 1945.
