= Zgornja Lipnica =

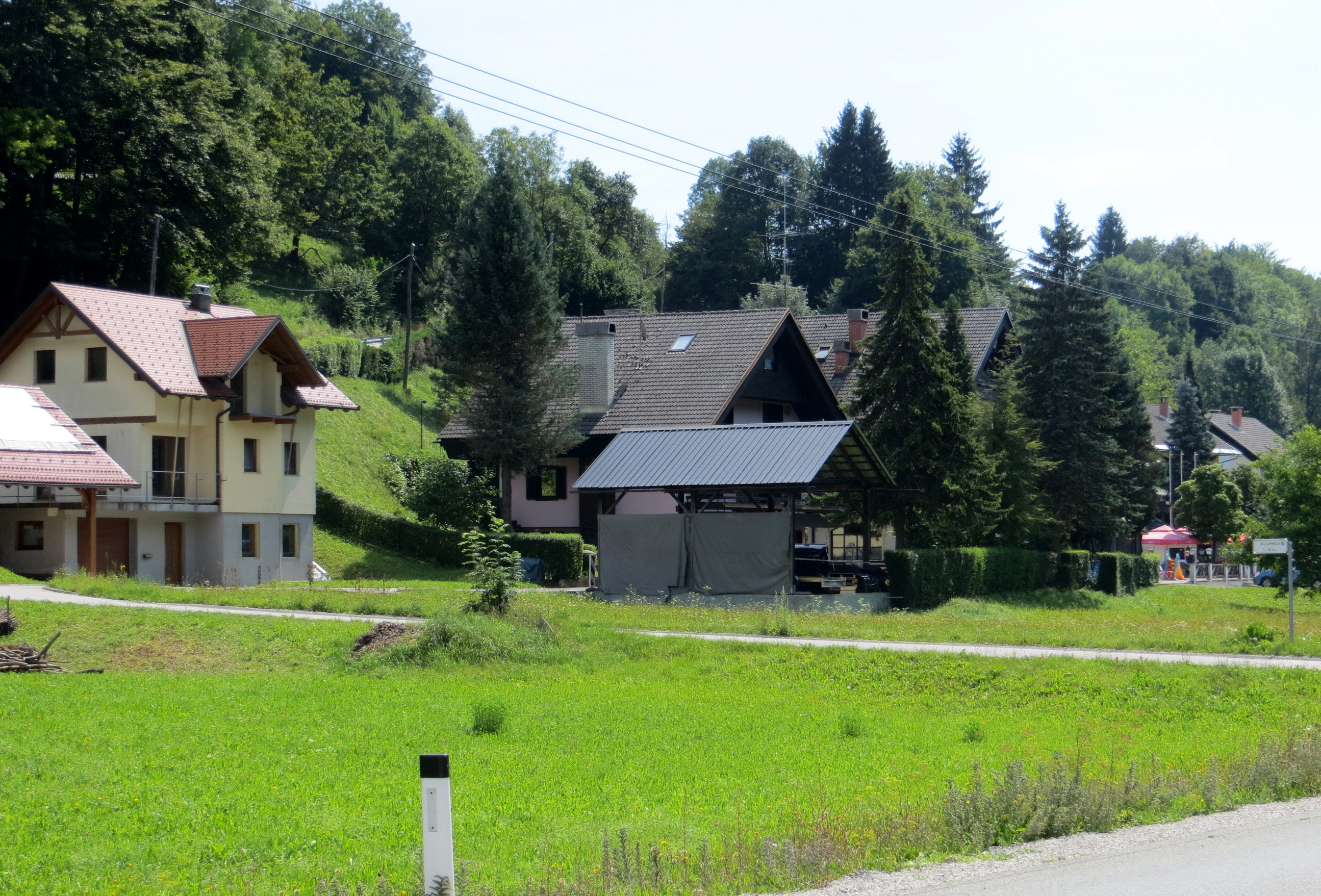

- Location in Slovenia
- Coordinates: 46°19′22.18″N 14°10′28.03″E
- Country: Slovenia
- Traditional region: Upper Carniola
- Statistical region: Upper Carniola
- Municipality: Radovljica
- Elevation: 511.2 m (1,677 ft)

Population (2017)
  - Total: 174

Zgornja Lipnica (pronounced [ˈzɡoːɾnja ˈliːpnitsa]) is a settlement in the Municipality of Radovljica in the Upper Carniola region of Slovenia.

== Name ==
The name Zgornja Lipnica literally means 'upper Lipnica', distinguishing the village from neighboring Spodnja Lipnica (literally, 'lower Lipnica'), which stands at an elevation 29 meters (95 ft) lower. The name Lipnica, like related names (e.g., Lipa, Lipnik, Lipovec, etc.), is derived from the Slovene common noun lipa 'linden', referring to the local vegetation.

== History ==
An elevation known as Pusti Grad ('abandoned castle'; elevation 590 meters or 1,940 feet) stands about 0.6 kilometers (0.37 mi) north-northwest of the center of Zgornja Lipnica. Lipnica Castle was built there in the 12th century and was owned by the Counts of Ortenburg. It came under the control of the Counts of Celje in 1418 and then the House of Habsburg in 1456. It was destroyed by forces commanded by the 15th-century Czech mercenary Jan Vitovec. The castle was then rebuilt, but it was burned in the 16th century.

=== Mass graves ===
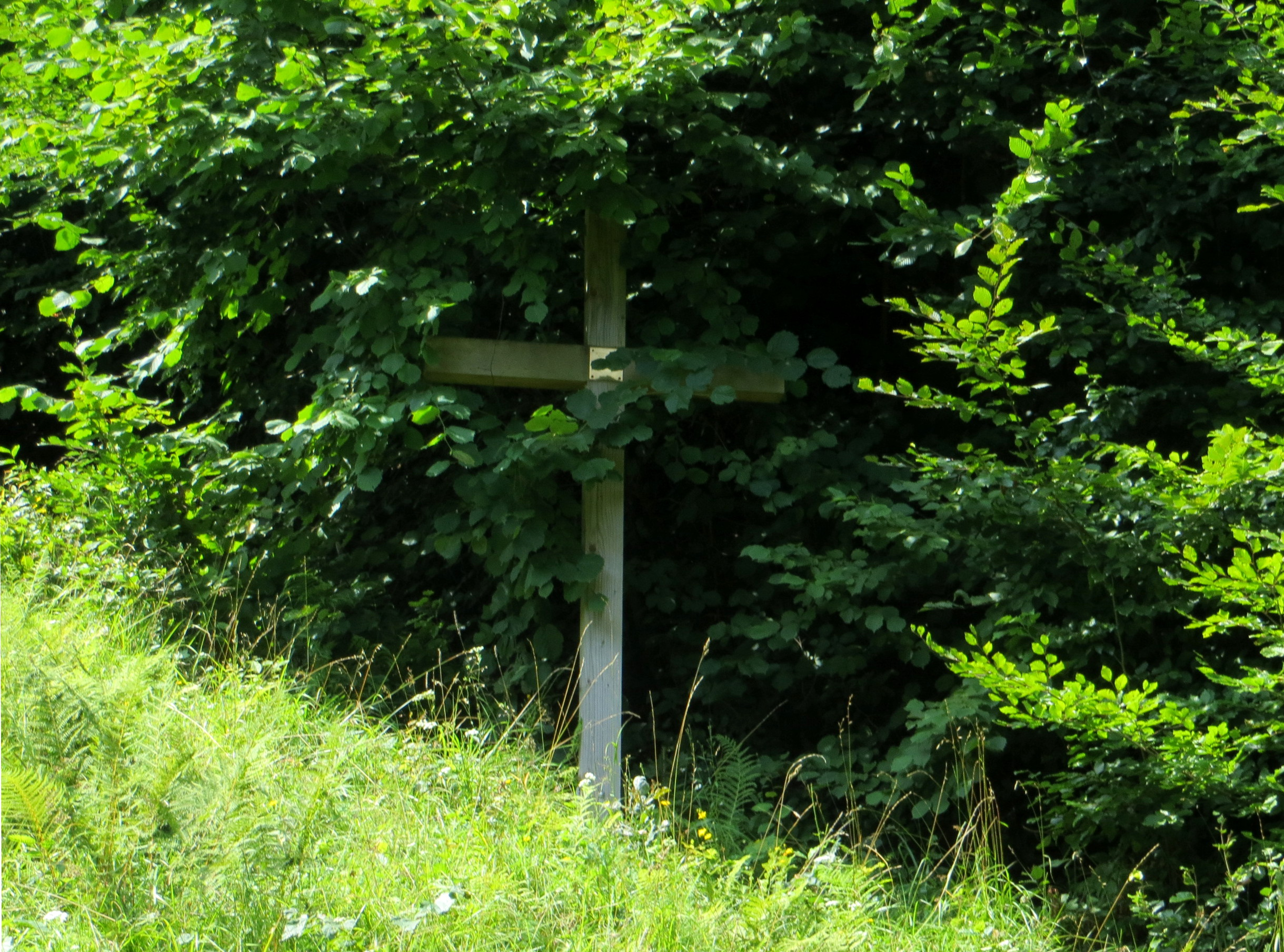
Lancovo 1 Mass Grave

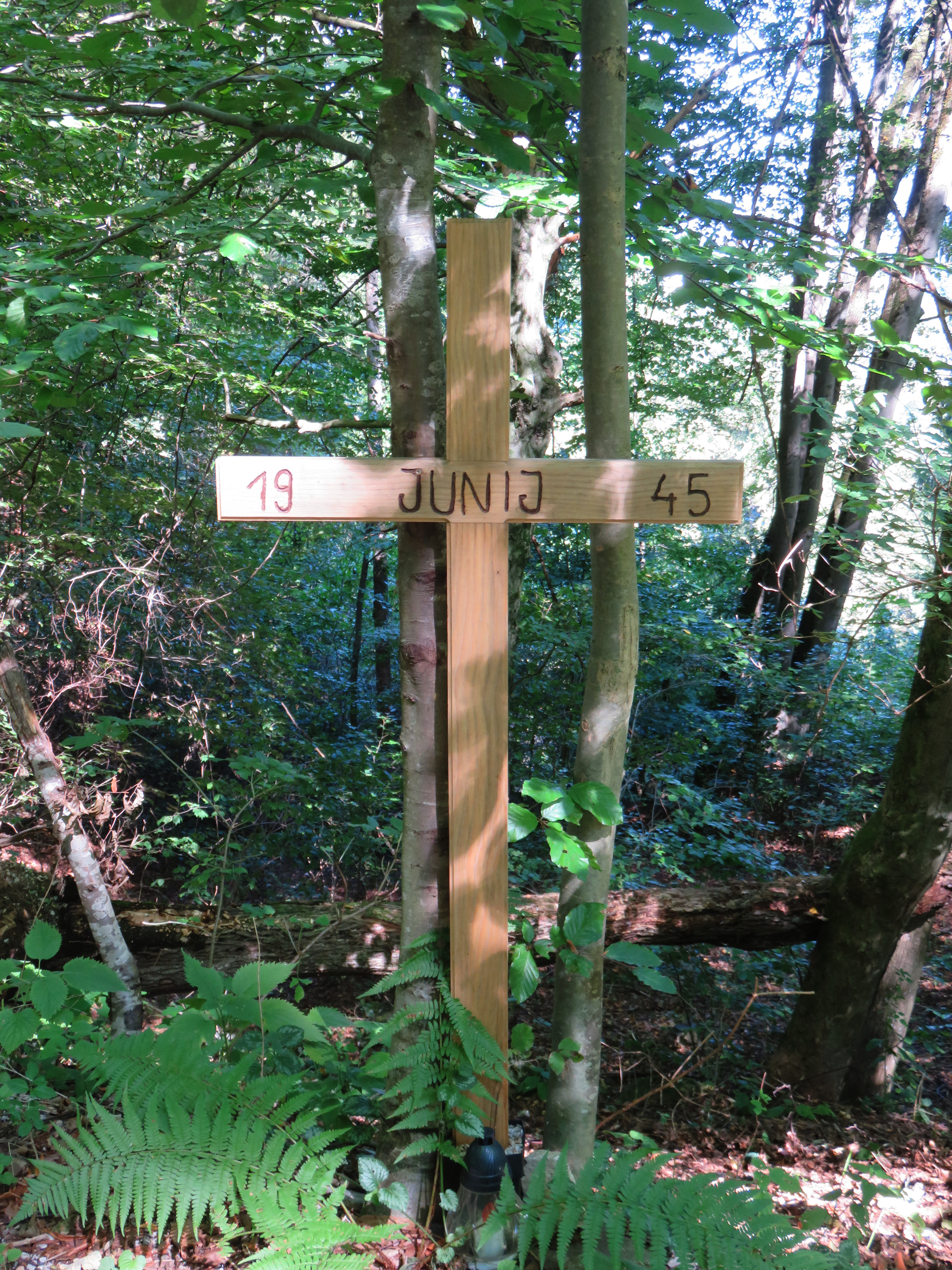
Lancovo 2 Mass Grave

Zgornja Lipnica is the site of two known mass graves from the period immediately after the Second World War. The Lancovo 1 and 2 mass graves (Slovene: Grobišče Lancovo 1, 2) lie north of the settlement and contain the bodies of a large number of civilians and Croatian soldiers murdered on the night of May 15, 1945. The first grave lies 15 meters (49 ft) from the road and is 5 to 3.5 meters (16 to 11 ft) wide and 10.5 meters (34 ft) long. The second grave lies on a wooded slope near the first.
