= Lipnica, Radovljica =

Lipnica
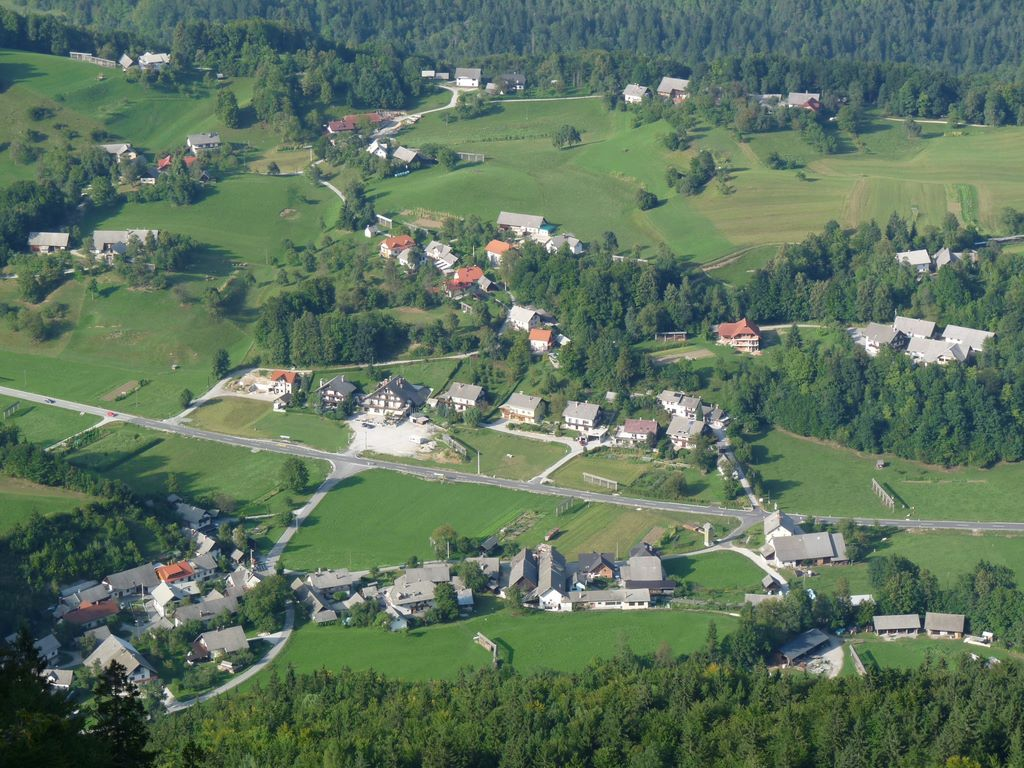

- Location in Slovenia
- Coordinates: 46°18′9.77″N 14°13′7.08″E
- Country: Slovenia
- Traditional region: Upper Carniola
- Statistical region: Upper Carniola
- Municipality: Radovljica
- Elevation: 423.1 m (1,388 ft)

Population (2017)
  - Total: 50

Lipnica (pronounced [ˈliːpnitsa]) is a settlement along Lipnica Creek in the Municipality of Radovljica in the Upper Carniola region of Slovenia.

== Name ==
The name Lipnica, like related names (e.g., Lipa, Lipnik, Lipovec, etc.), is derived from the Slovene common noun lipa 'linden', referring to the local vegetation.
