= Liplje =

Liplje may refer to:

- Liplje Monastery, an Orthodox monastery near Teslić, Bosnia and Herzegovina
- Liplje, Kamnik, a village in Slovenia
- Liplje, Ljig, a village in Serbia
- Liplje, Postojna, a village in Slovenia
- Liplje, Vrbovsko, a village in Croatia
- Liplje, Zvornik, a mountain village near Zvornik, Bosnia and Herzegovina
  - Liplje camp, concentration camp in operation in Liplje village during the Bosnian War
