= Podlesje =

Podlesje Verdreng, Ferdreng (until 1955)
- Location in Slovenia
- Coordinates: 45°32′13.33″N 14°57′33.8″E
- Country: Slovenia
- Traditional region: Lower Carniola
- Statistical region: Southeast Slovenia
- Municipality: Kočevje

Area
  - Total: 15.34 km^{2} (5.92 sq mi)
- Elevation: 510.9 m (1,676 ft)
- Postal code: 1330

Podlesje (pronounced [pɔˈdleːsjɛ]; German: Verdreng) is an abandoned settlement in the Municipality of Kočevje in southern Slovenia. It was a village inhabited by Gottschee Germans. During the Second World War its original population was expelled. The area is part of the traditional region of Lower Carniola and is now included in the Southeast Slovenia Statistical Region.

== Name ==
The name of the settlement was changed from Verdreng (identical to the German name Verdreng), or the Slovenianized form Ferdreng, to Podlesje in 1955. The name was changed on the basis of the 1948 Law on Names of Settlements and Designations of Squares, Streets, and Buildings as part of efforts by Slovenia's postwar communist government to remove German elements from toponyms. During the Second World War, there were plans to reuse the name Verdreng for the villages of Rigonce and neighboring Loče in the Rann Triangle (German: Ranner Dreieck).

== History ==
During the Second World War, the village was burned by Italian forces in August 1942. Together with Zgornji Pokštajn, Spodnji Pokštajn, and Lapinje, it was merged into the settlement of Podlesje in 1955.

=== Prison camp ===
After the Second World War, Slovenia's postwar communist authorities set up a forced labor camp for female political prisoners at Podlesje. The prisoners included nuns, minors, and persons accused of having contact with the West. In 1949 about 600 women were imprisoned at the camp under very poor hygiene conditions. Prisoners that had previously been held at Auschwitz stated that the conditions at Podlesje were even worse. Internees were sentenced to perform "socially useful work" at the concentration camp; the labor involved destroying the local Gottschee German cemetery, breaking rocks into gravel for the roads, and destroying church statuary. The camp was modeled on Nazi concentration camps, with barbed wire, guard towers, and prisoners' barracks. Eventually the camp was closed and the prisoners were transferred to the concentration camp at the castle in Škofja Loka, where they were gradually released. Before they were released, they were forced to sign statements that they would not speak about conditions at the camp.

== Church ==
The local church, dedicated to John the Baptist, was a Baroque church built in the 18th century on the site of an earlier church. It was demolished after 1952. A similar fate awaited the early 17th-century chapel dedicated to the Virgin Mary on Mount Verdreng (Verdrenška gora; also known as Mount Verderb, Verderbška gora) north of the village, demolished between 1952 and 1955. The hill itself was known as Virgin's Mount (Dekličina gora) before the war and is occasionally still labeled as such. It was renamed after the war to remove its religious associations.
