= Rigonce =

- Location in Slovenia
- Coordinates: 45°53′16.13″N 15°40′56.52″E
- Country: Slovenia
- Traditional region: Styria
- Statistical region: Lower Sava
- Municipality: Brežice

Area
  - Total: 1.55 km^{2} (0.60 sq mi)
- Elevation: 140.4 m (461 ft)

Population (2020)
  - Total: 165
  - Density: 106/km^{2} (276/sq mi)

Rigonce (pronounced [ˈɾiːɡɔntsɛ], German: Riegelsdorf) is a settlement in the Municipality of Brežice in eastern Slovenia. The area is part of the traditional region of Styria. It is now included with the rest of the municipality in the Lower Sava Statistical Region.

== Geography ==
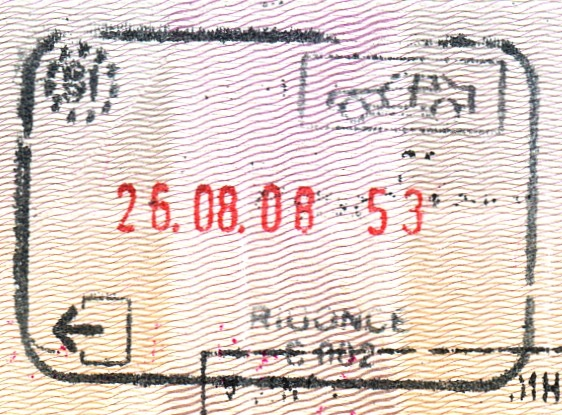
A passport stamp issued at the border with Croatia

Rigonce is a ribbon village on the border with Croatia. It lies on the right bank of the Sotla River shortly before its confluence with the Sava River. Rigonce is divided by the rail line into two hamlets; the part to the north is known as Zgornje Rigonce (literally, 'upper Rigonce'), and that to the south as Spodnje Rigonce (literally, 'lower Rigonce'). The Rigonce Plain (Slovene: Rigonško polje) lies west of the village and extends almost to Dobova. There are fields and meadows south of the village. There is sandy soil closer to the river, and a mixture of loamy-sandy soil elsewhere.

== History ==
During the Second World War, the residents of the village were evicted in the fall of 1941 and Gottschee Germans were resettled in the houses as part of the Rann Triangle (German: Ranner Dreieck). At that time, there were plans to rename the village, together with neighboring Loče, Verdreng after an evacuated Gottschee village.

On one single day, 25 October 2015, about 4,000 refugees crossed the border and entered Slovenia during the European migrant crisis.

== Shrine ==
A small chapel-shrine with a belfry, northwest of the main settlement by the tracks of the main railway line from Ljubljana to Zagreb, which runs through the settlement, is dedicated to Our Lady of Sorrows and was built in the early 20th century.

== Notable people ==
Notable people that lived or were born in Rigonce include:

- Avgust Gerjovič (1919–1943), Partisan agitator
- Ciril Gerjovič (1923–1941), Partisan agitator
- Marko Gerjovič (nom de guerre Tine; 1914–1944), Partisan agitator
