= Leše =

Leše is a Slovene place name that may refer to:

- Leše, Litija, a settlement in the Municipality of Litija, central Slovenia
- Leše, Prevalje, a settlement in the Municipality of Prevalje, northern Slovenia
- Leše, Tržič, a settlement in the Municipality of Tržič, northwestern Slovenia
- Lessach, a settlement in the Municipality of Sankt Jakob im Rosental, southern Austria
