= Laze, Gorenja Vas–Poljane =

Laze
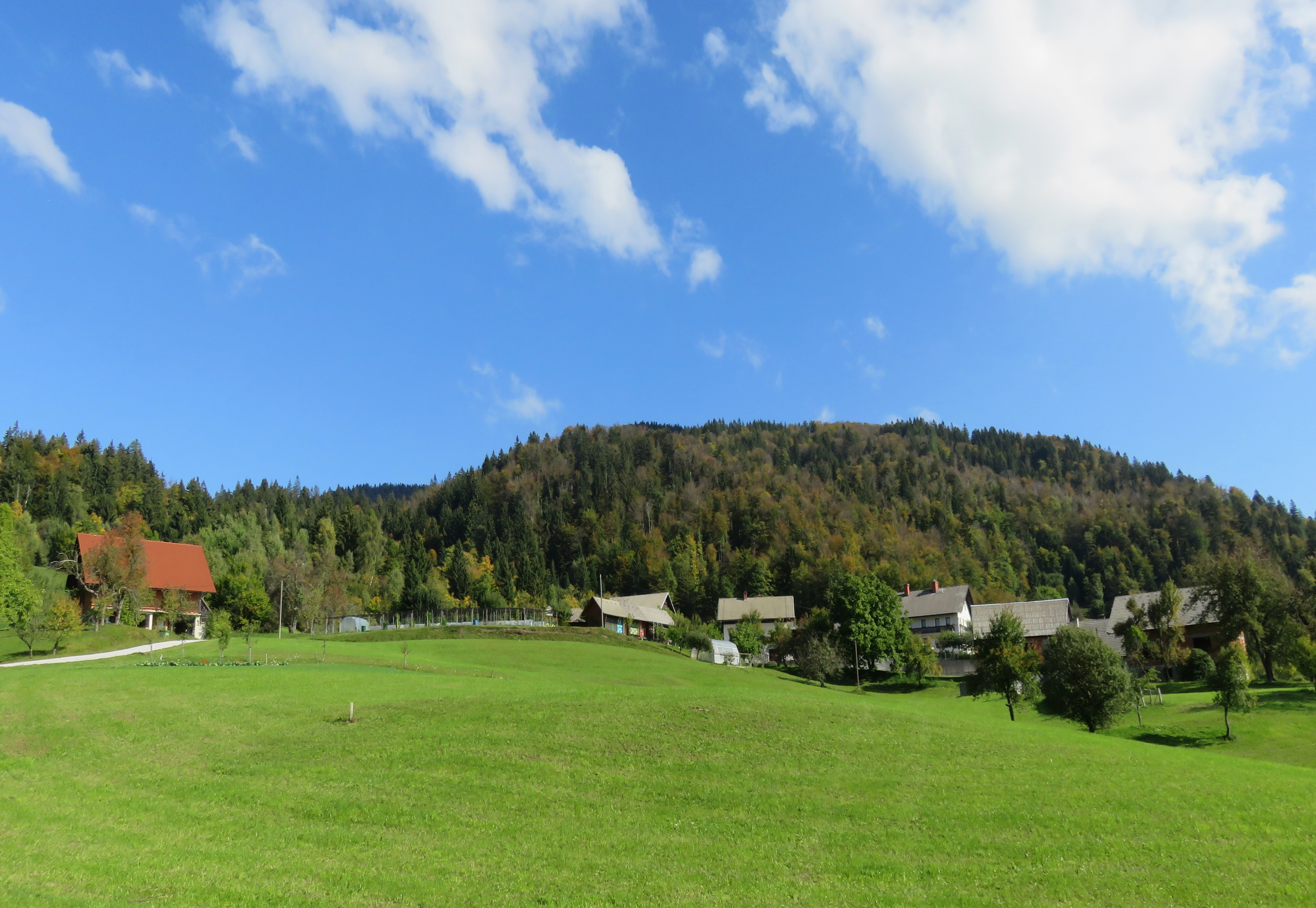

- Location in Slovenia
- Coordinates: 46°9′1.8″N 14°4′35.64″E
- Country: Slovenia
- Traditional region: Upper Carniola
- Statistical region: Upper Carniola
- Municipality: Gorenja Vas–Poljane

Area
  - Total: 0.29 km^{2} (0.11 sq mi)
- Elevation: 853.5 m (2,800 ft)

Population (2020)
  - Total: 28
  - Density: 97/km^{2} (250/sq mi)

Laze (pronounced [ˈlaːzɛ]) is a small settlement between Leskovica and Robidnica in the Municipality of Gorenja Vas–Poljane in the Upper Carniola region of Slovenia.
