= Lipnica Castle =

Coordinates: 46.3273°N 14.1699°E

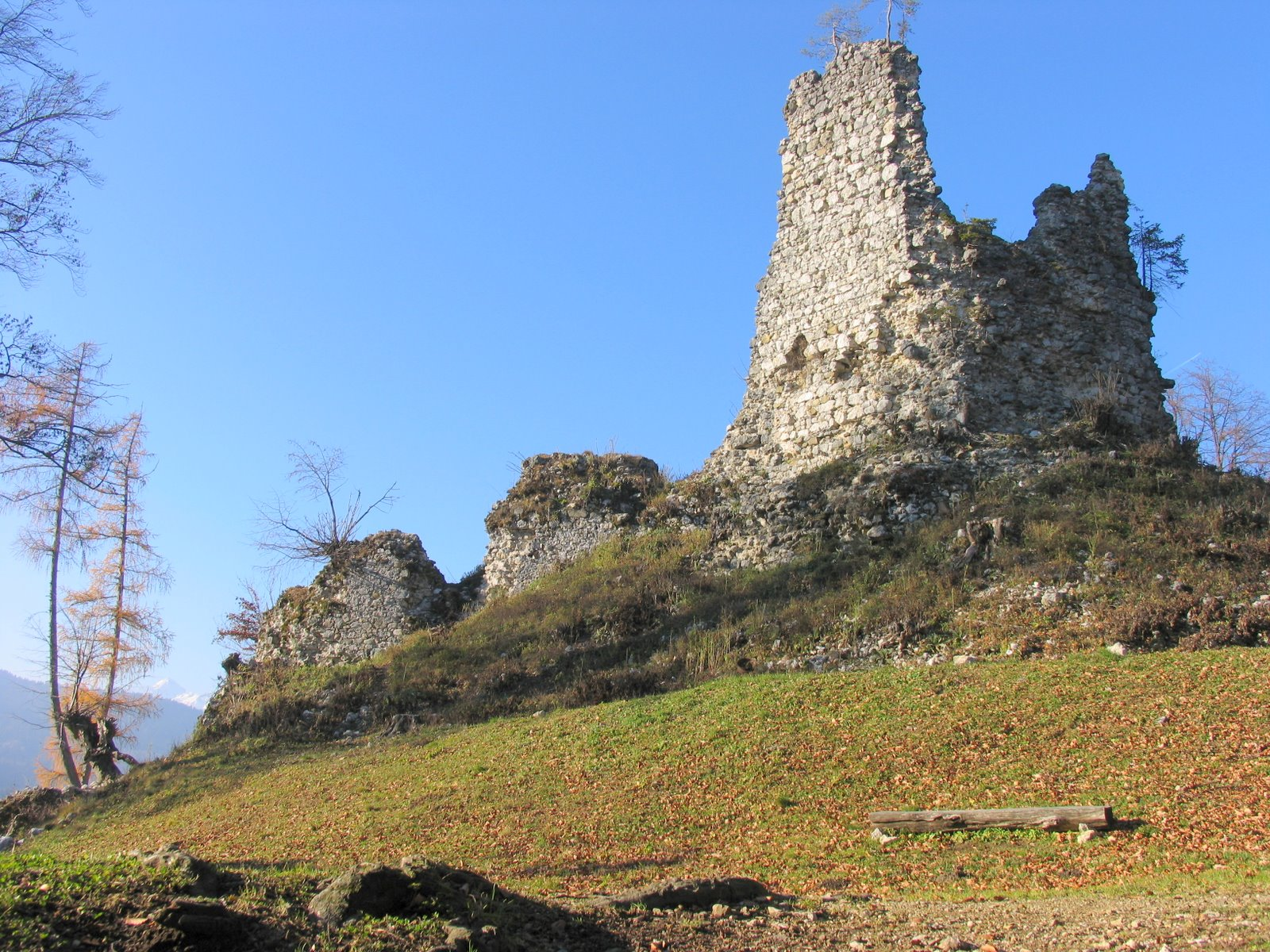
Lipnica Castle

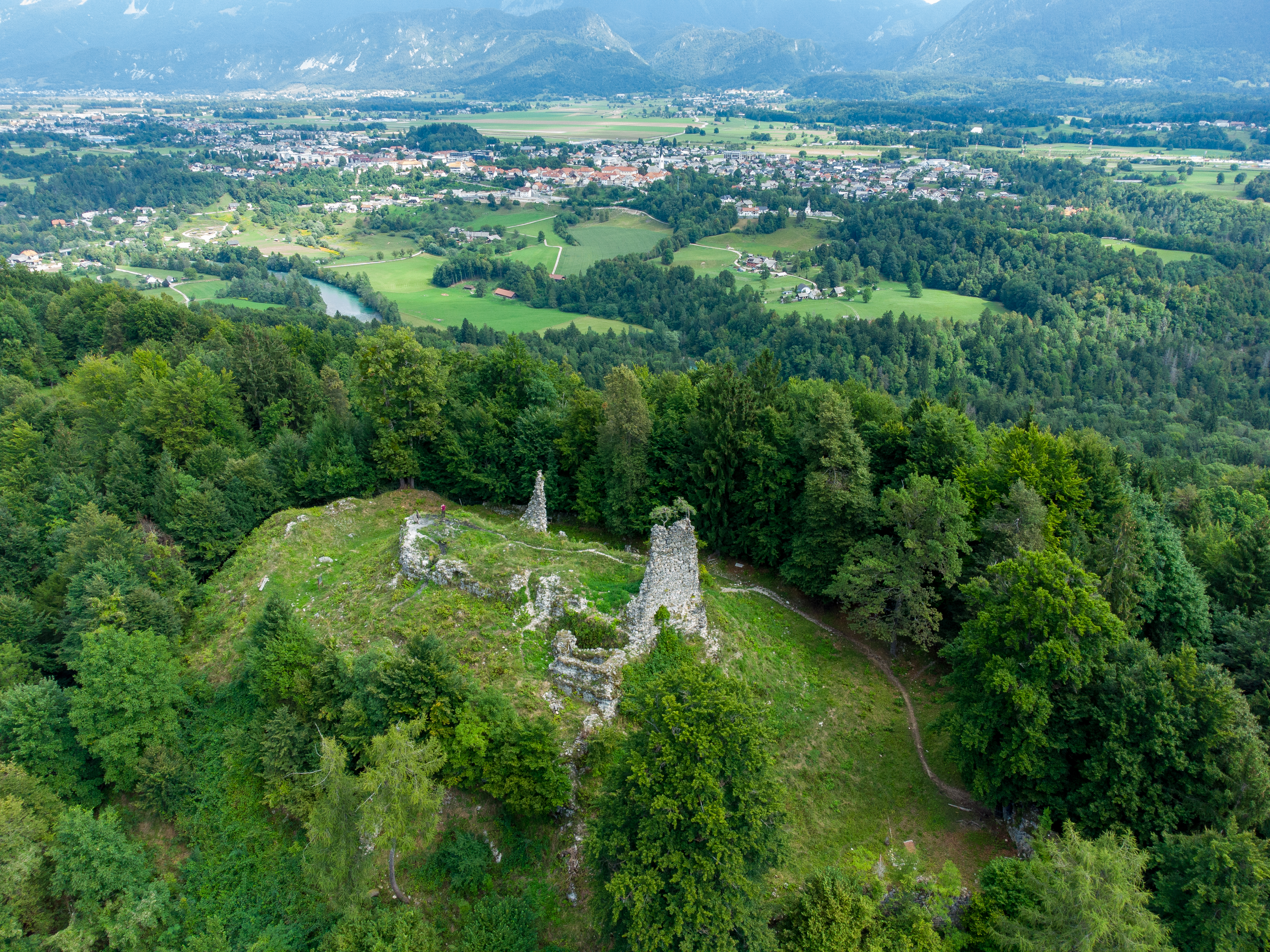
Lipnica Castle

Lipnica Castle (Slovene: Lipniški grad, German: Waldenberg), also known as Deserted Castle above Lipnica (Pusti grad nad Lipnico), is a castle ruin near the settlement of Zgornja Lipnica in Upper Carniola (northwestern Slovenia), above Lipnica Creek, in the Municipality of Radovljica.

== History ==
The castle was once the seat of the Upper Carniolan holdings of the noble house of Ortenburg. First mentioned in 1263 as castrum Waldemberch, it was administered by the knights of Waldenberg, themselves first recorded in 1228 with a Fridericus de Waldenberch.

After the death of Count Friderik III of Ortenburg in 1418 at the castle, the lordship of Lipnica was inherited by the counts of Celje; after their extinction in 1456 the castle became a ducal holding. Its castellans included the houses of Heunsberg, Dulacer, Velacer and Stain (of Kamen pri Begunjah), and the Lambergs. The lordship of Lipnica was managed by the Kacijanar family, the counts of Dietrichstein, and others, until the counts of Thurn merged it with Radovljica around 1600.

Lipnica Castle had been abandoned by then, having burned down in the 16th century and not deemed worth repairing. The core of the ruins consists of an impressive Romanesque palacium, likely dating to the 12th century.

== In culture ==
In 1939, the writer Josip Lavtižar set a historical novel at the castle. It is also the setting of the play Pusti grad (Deserted Castle) by Polona Škrinjar.

== Gallery ==
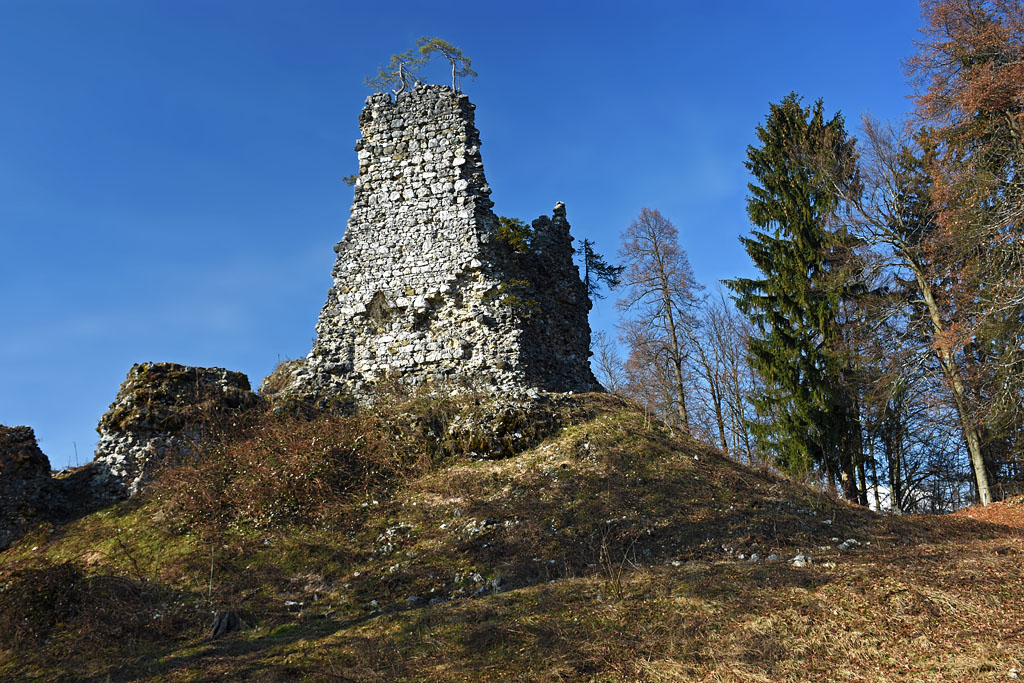
The central tower

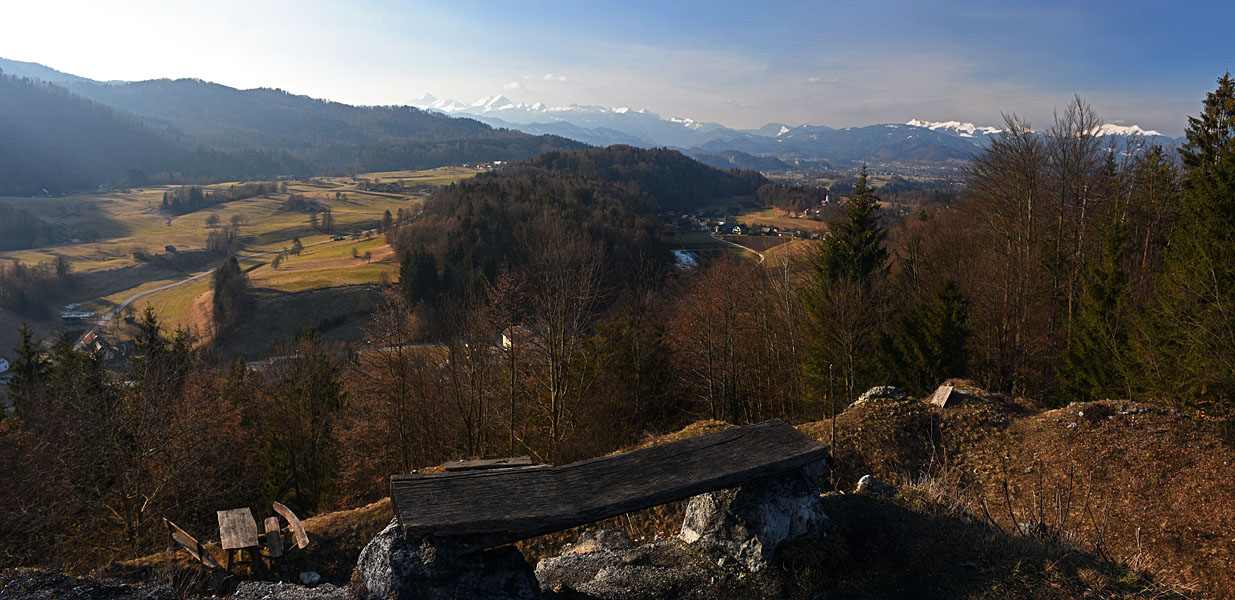
Western views

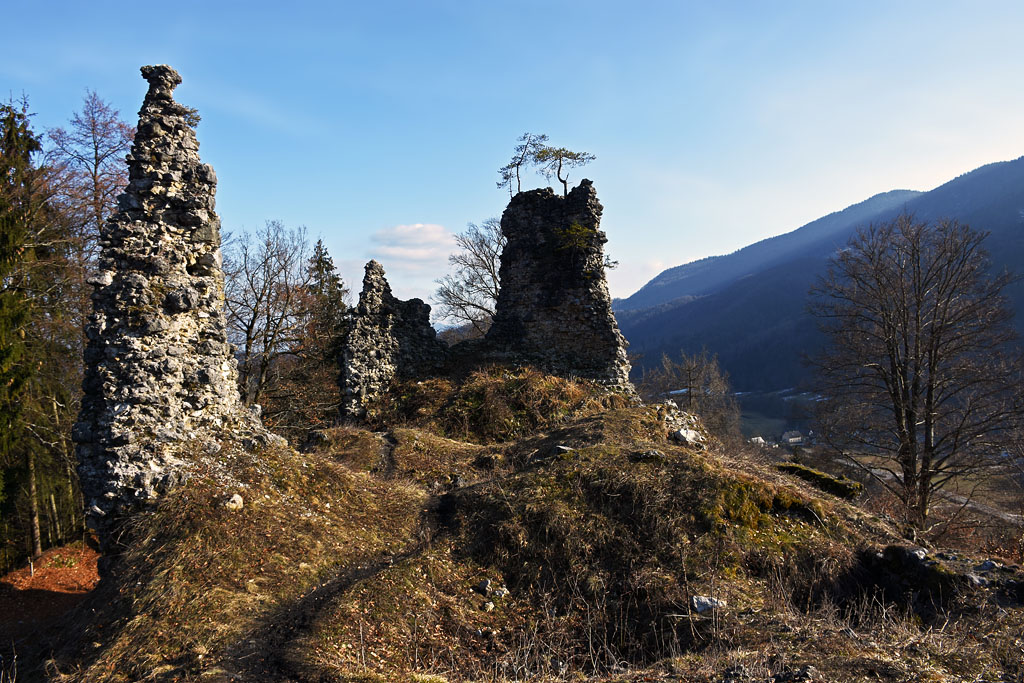
Palace remains

== Sources ==
- Jakič, Ivan: "Vsi slovenski gradovi", DZS, 1999, ISBN 86-341-2325-1
- Lipniški grad pri Radovljici: Zgodovinska povest iz 14. in 15. stoletja, 1939, Josip Lavtižar
