= Spodnji Pokštajn =

- Location in Slovenia
- Coordinates: 45°31′12.61″N 14°58′59.88″E
- Country: Slovenia
- Traditional region: Lower Carniola
- Statistical region: Southeast Slovenia
- Municipality: Kočevje

Population (2002)
  - Total: 0

Spodnji Pokštajn (pronounced [ˈspoːdnji ˈpoːkʃtai̯n]; also Spodnji Pokštanj, German: Unterpockstein) is a former village in the Municipality of Kočevje in southern Slovenia. The area is part of the traditional region of Lower Carniola and is now included in the Southeast Slovenia Statistical Region. Its territory is now part of the village of Podlesje.

== History ==
Together with Verdreng, Zgornji Pokštajn, and Lapinje, it was merged into the settlement of Podlesje in 1955.
