= Lapinje =

- Location in Slovenia
- Coordinates: 45°30′26.93″N 14°59′4.98″E
- Country: Slovenia
- Traditional region: Lower Carniola
- Statistical region: Southeast Slovenia
- Municipality: Kočevje
- Elevation: 581.7 m (1,908 ft)

Population (2002)
  - Total: 0

Lapinje (pronounced [ˈlaːpinjɛ]; German: Neugereuth or Laubbüchel) is a former village in the Municipality of Kočevje in southern Slovenia. The area is part of the traditional region of Lower Carniola and is now included in the Southeast Slovenia Statistical Region. Its territory is now part of the village of Podlesje.

== History ==
Lapinje was a Gottschee German village. In feudal times it was part of the Dominion of Poljane. In 1576 it consisted of one full farm and one half-farm. In 1931 there were five houses in the village. The Cankar Brigade of the Partisan forces was founded in Lapinje in 1942; a plaque has been installed at the site to commemorate the event. Together with Verdreng, Zgornji Pokštajn, and Spodnji Pokštajn, it was merged into the settlement of Podlesje in 1955.
