= Robidnica =

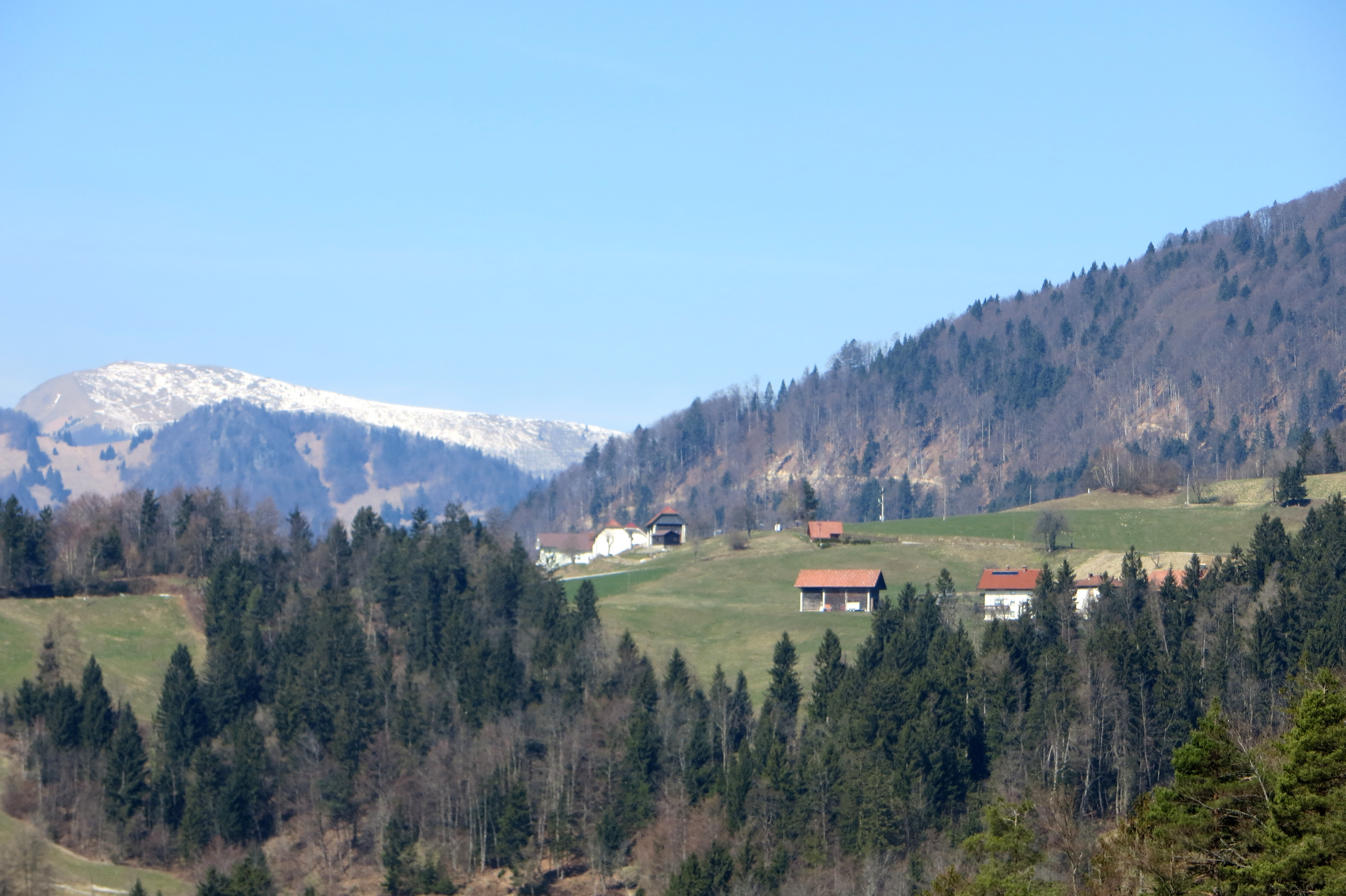

- Location in Slovenia
- Coordinates: 46°9′6.2″N 14°4′18.32″E
- Country: Slovenia
- Traditional region: Upper Carniola
- Statistical region: Upper Carniola
- Municipality: Gorenja Vas–Poljane

Area
  - Total: 0.35 km^{2} (0.14 sq mi)
- Elevation: 896.5 m (2,941 ft)

Population (2023)
  - Total: 14
  - Density: 40/km^{2} (100/sq mi)

Robidnica (pronounced [ɾɔˈbiːdnitsa]) is a small settlement above the village of Leskovica in the Municipality of Gorenja Vas–Poljane in the Upper Carniola region of Slovenia.
