= Luče, Grosuplje =

Luče
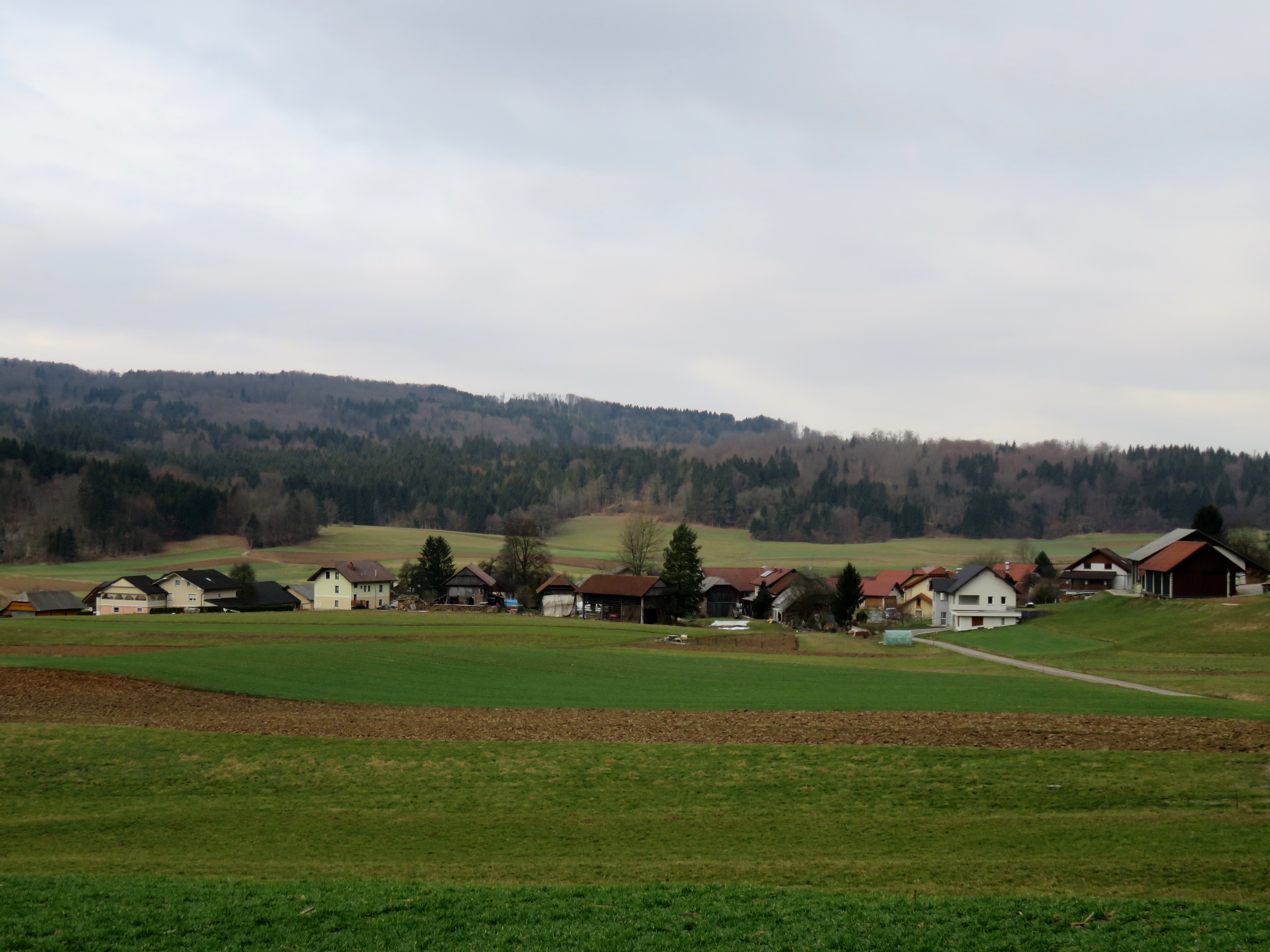

- Location in Slovenia
- Coordinates: 45°55′11.54″N 14°43′49.96″E
- Country: Slovenia
- Traditional region: Lower Carniola
- Statistical region: Central Slovenia
- Municipality: Grosuplje

Area
  - Total: 5.08 km^{2} (1.96 sq mi)
- Elevation: 315 m (1,033 ft)

Population (2002)
  - Total: 276

Luče (pronounced [ˈluːtʃɛ]; German: Leitsch) is a village in the Municipality of Grosuplje in central Slovenia. The area is part of the historical region of Lower Carniola. The municipality is now included in the Central Slovenia Statistical Region.

== Church ==
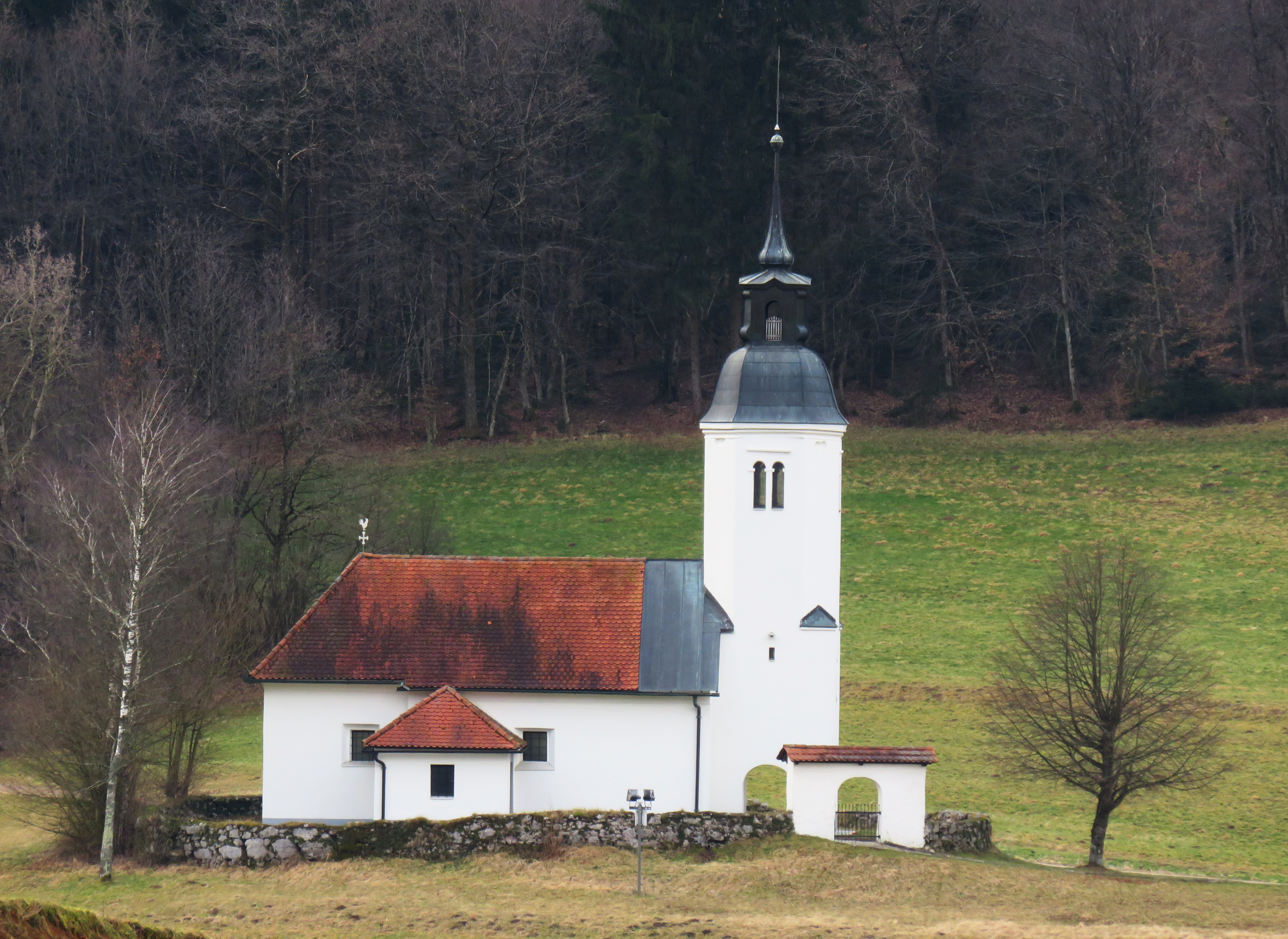
Saint Oswald's Church

The local church is dedicated to Saint Oswald (Slovene: sveti Ožbolt) and belongs to the Parish of Žalna. It is a medieval building that was greatly rebuilt and restyled in the 18th century.
