= Laporje, Velike Lašče =

Laporje
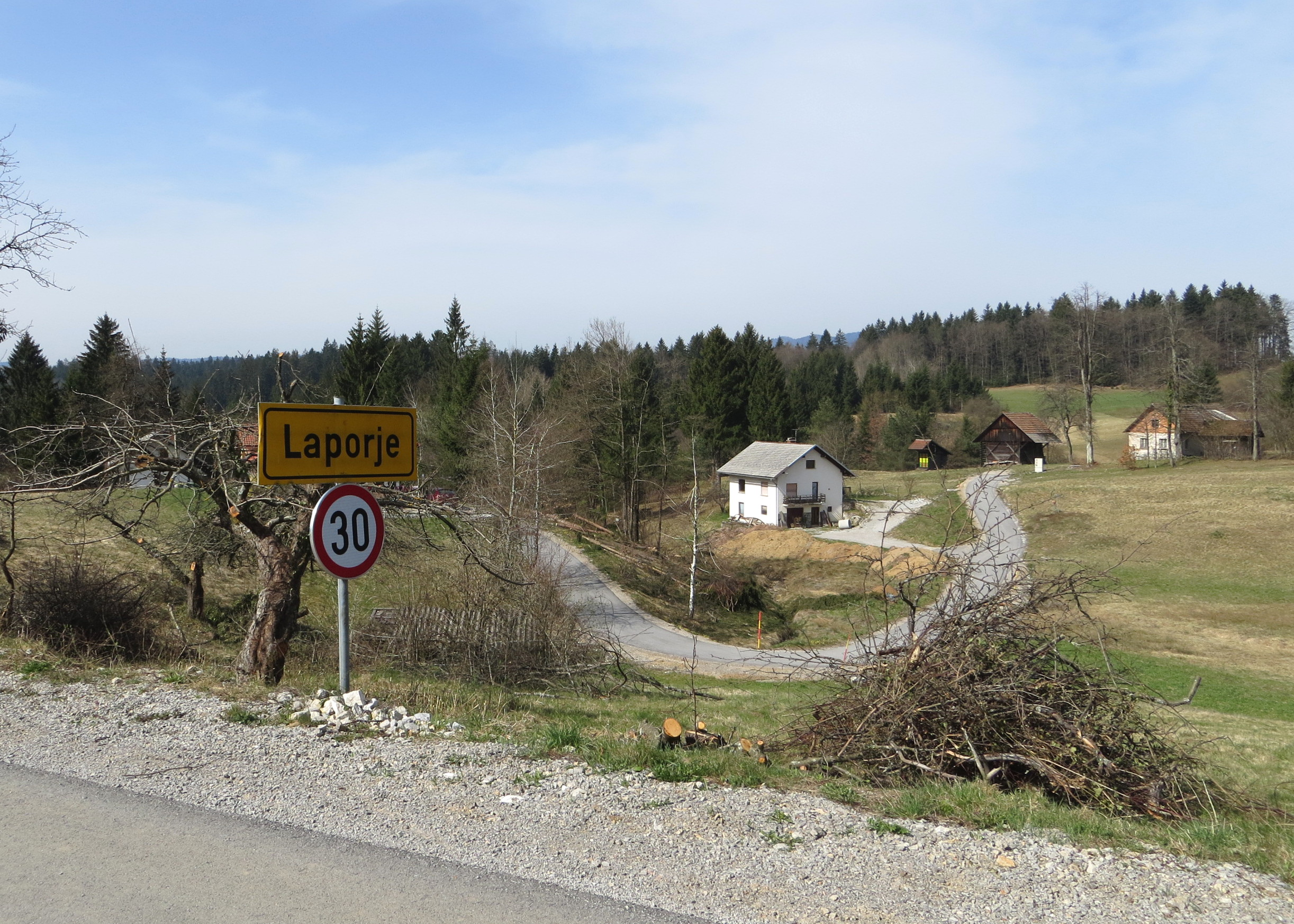

- Location in Slovenia
- Coordinates: 45°52′22.33″N 14°37′20.32″E
- Country: Slovenia
- Traditional region: Lower Carniola
- Statistical region: Central Slovenia
- Municipality: Velike Lašče

Area
  - Total: 1.53 km^{2} (0.59 sq mi)
- Elevation: 536.8 m (1,761 ft)

Population (2002)
  - Total: 41
- Postal code: 1315

Laporje (pronounced [ˈlaːpɔɾjɛ]) is a settlement southeast of Turjak in the Municipality of Velike Lašče in central Slovenia. It is included in the Central Slovenia Statistical Region. The area is part of the traditional region of Lower Carniola.

== Name ==
Laporje was first attested in written sources in 1436 as Lappriach (and as Lapriach in 1463 and again as Lappriach in 1476). The name is derived from the Slovene common noun lapor 'marl', referring to the characteristics of the local soil. The place name is now a singular neuter form but, based on the locative plurals reflected in the medieval attestations, it was probably originally the plural demonym *Lapor′ane (literally, 'people living on marly soil').

== Gallery ==
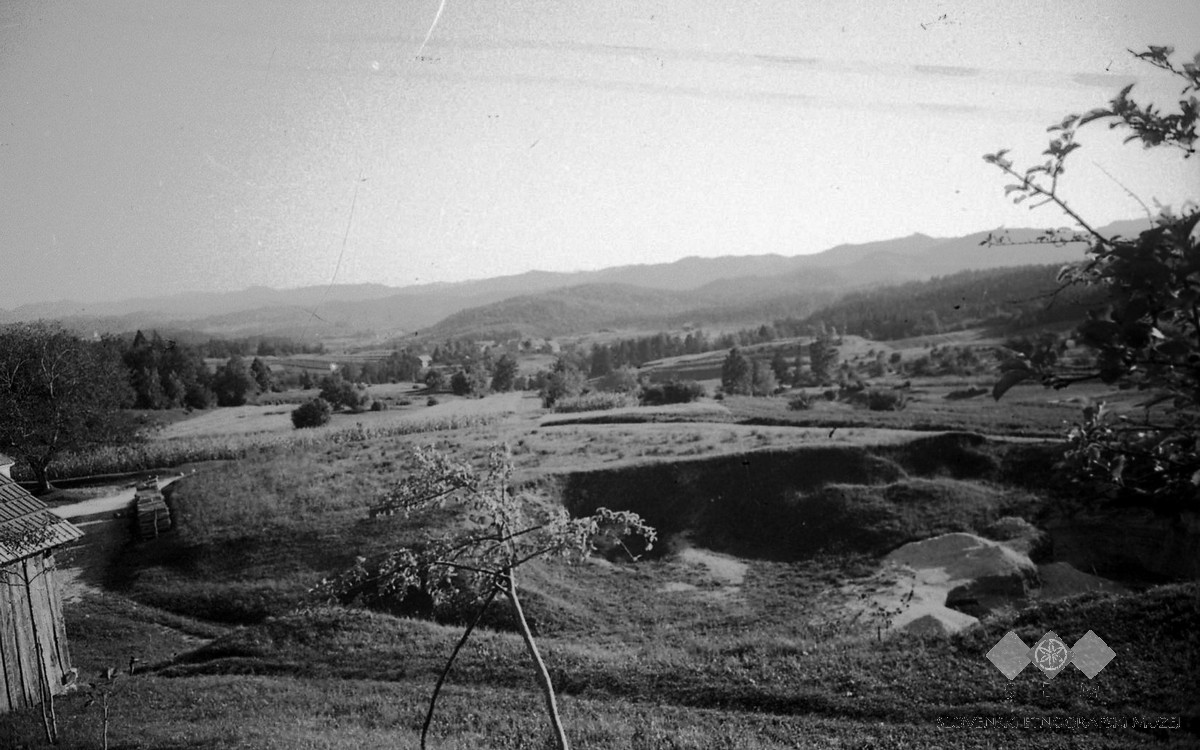
Laporje in 1948
