= Liplje, Postojna =

Liplje
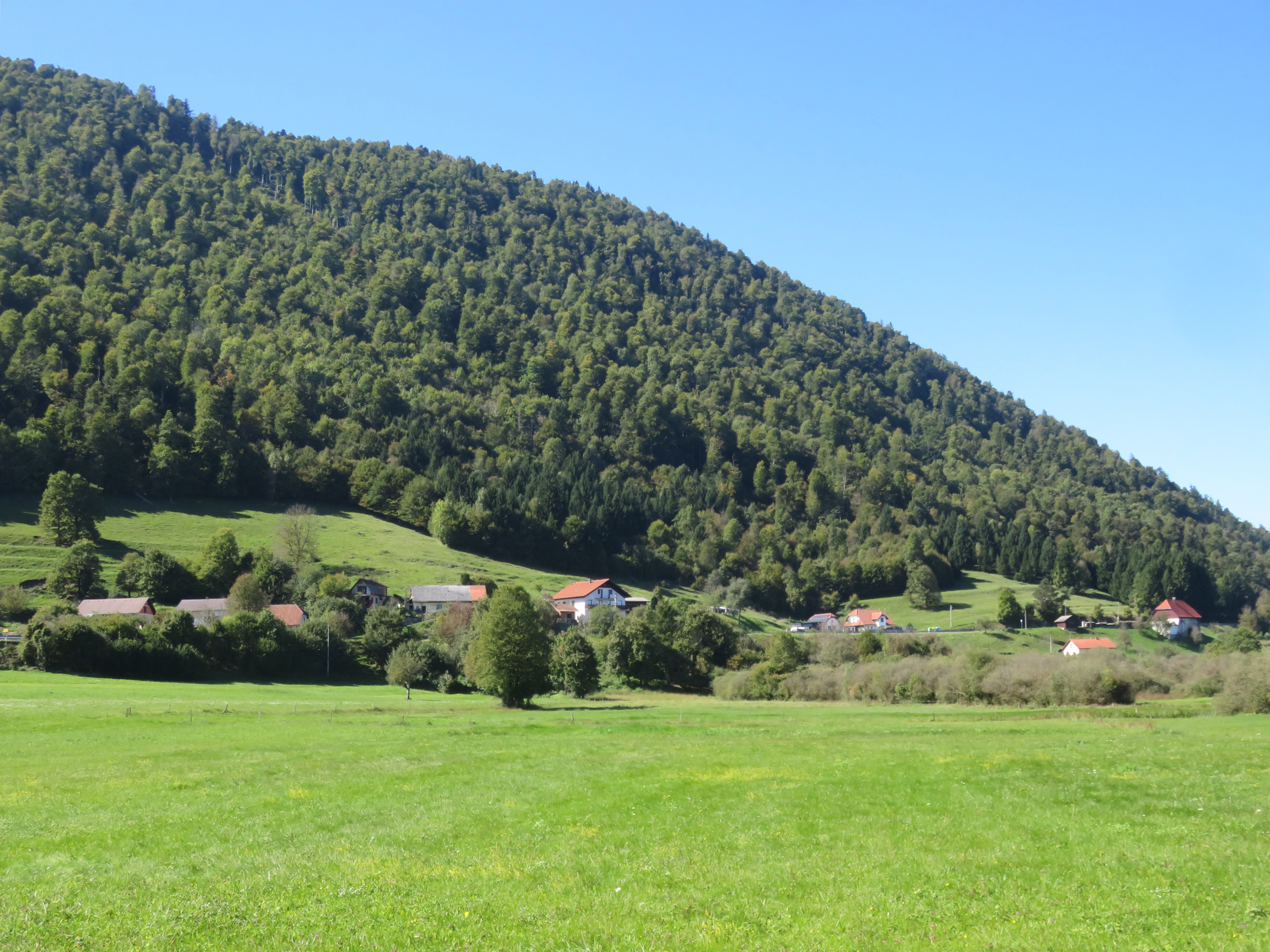

- Location in Slovenia
- Coordinates: 45°50′42.47″N 14°15′3.34″E
- Country: Slovenia
- Traditional region: Inner Carniola
- Statistical region: Littoral–Inner Carniola
- Municipality: Postojna

Area
  - Total: 1.5 km^{2} (0.58 sq mi)
- Elevation: 455.1 m (1,493 ft)

Population (2002)
  - Total: 29

Liplje (pronounced [ˈliːpljɛ], German: Liple) is a small settlement north of Planina in the Municipality of Postojna in the Inner Carniola region of Slovenia.

== Geography ==
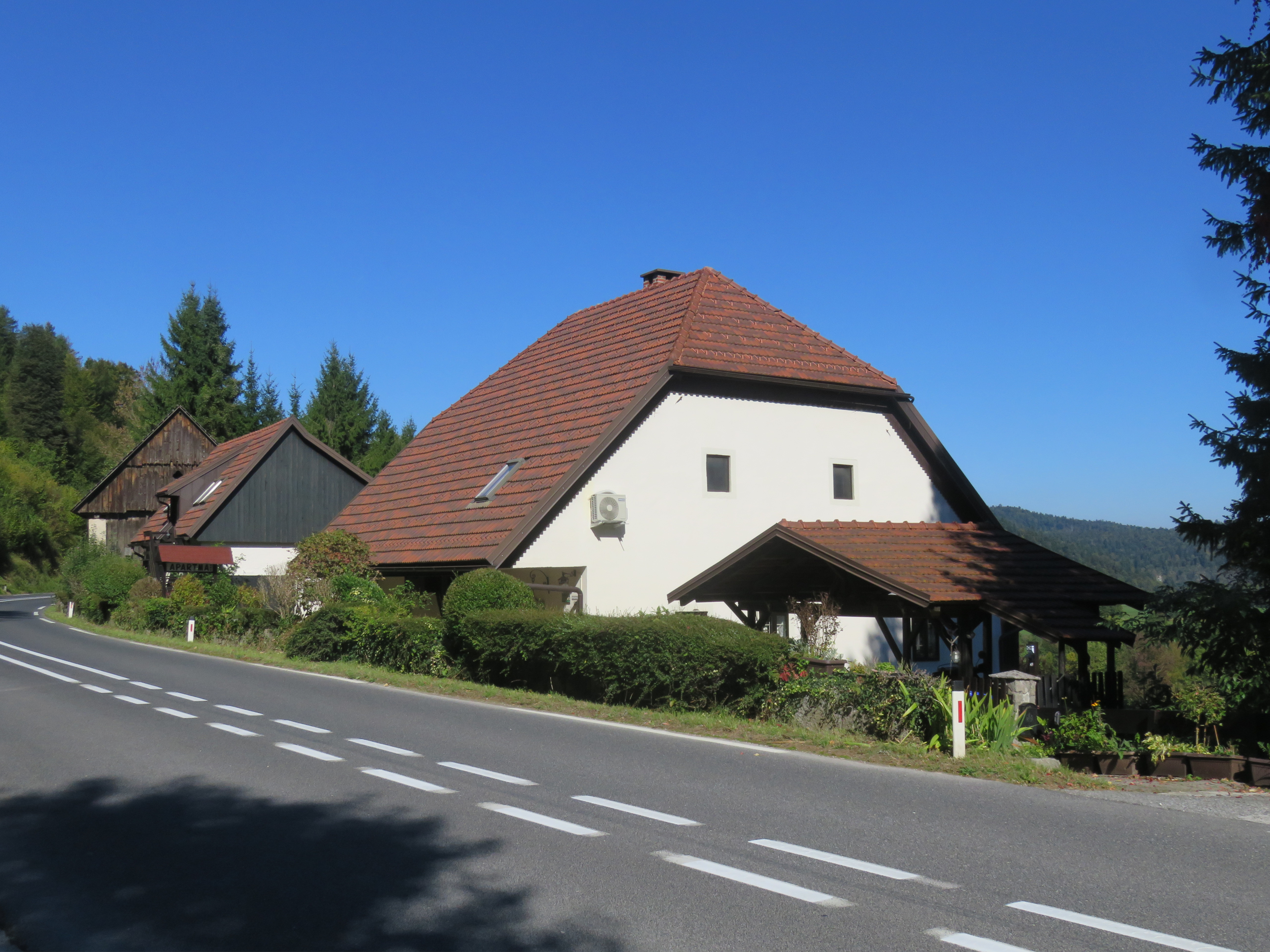
The hamlet of Podgora

Liplje is a scattered village below the east slope of Mount Planina (Planinska gora) and on the western edge of the Planina Karst Field (Planinsko polje) along the main road from Logatec to Planina. It includes the hamlet of Podgora north-northwest of the village core. There are some hayfields and tilled land in the karst field itself that are subject to occasional flooding. There are several springs below the road and above the karst field.

== Name ==
The name Liplje is derived from a plural demonym, *Lipľane 'residents of Lipa', itself derived from the common noun lipa 'linden', referring to the local vegetation. Places named after the linden tree are common in Slovenia, with other examples including Lipa, Lipe, Lipje, Lipica, and Lipce.
