= Lopar, Koper =

Lopar Loparo
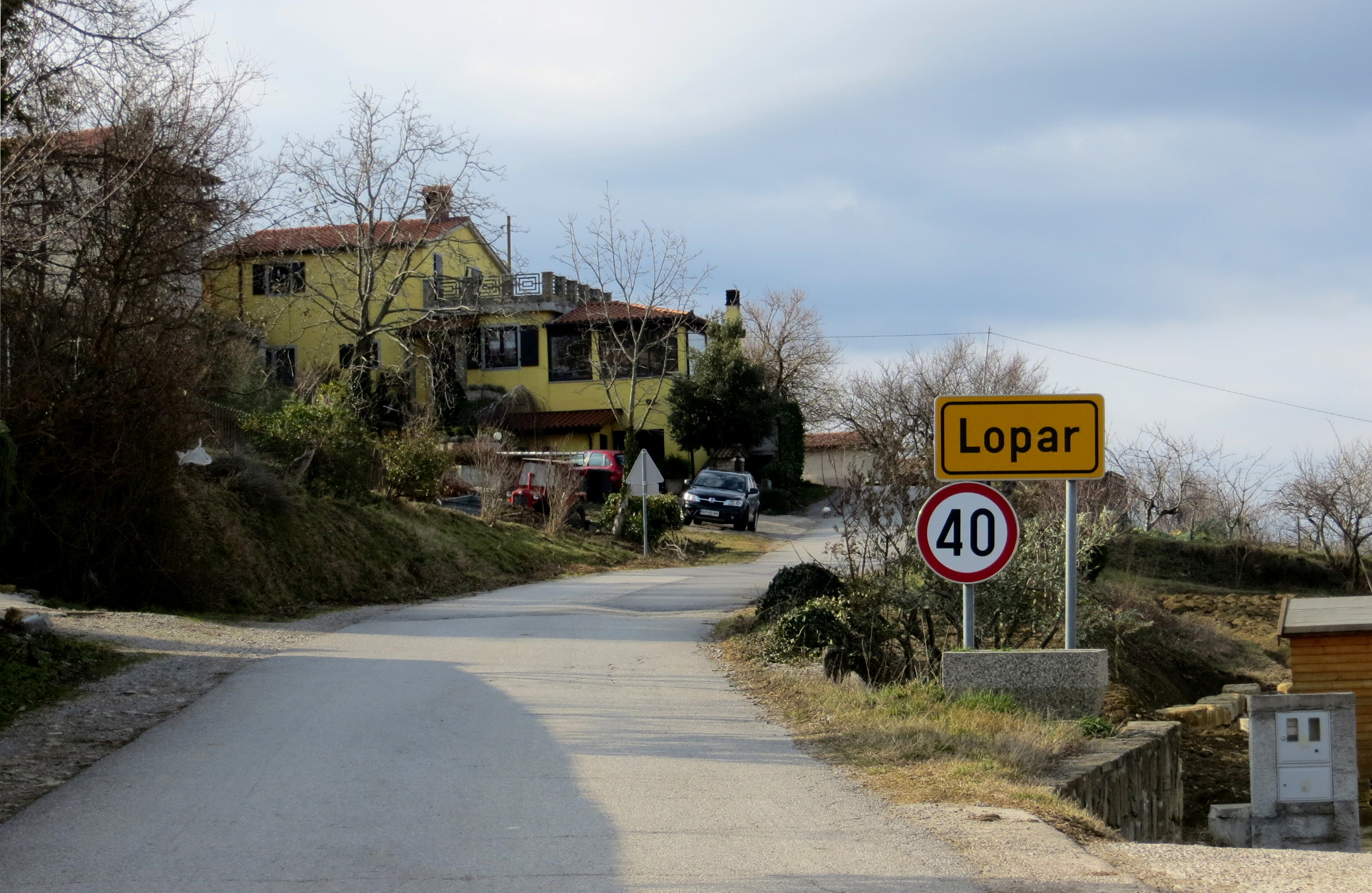

- Location in Slovenia
- Coordinates: 45°30′30.37″N 13°49′30.47″E
- Country: Slovenia
- Traditional region: Littoral
- Statistical region: Coastal–Karst
- Municipality: Koper

Area
  - Total: 2.45 km^{2} (0.95 sq mi)
- Elevation: 302.8 m (993 ft)

Population (2002)
  - Total: 85

Lopar (pronounced [lɔˈpaːɾ]; Italian: Loparo) is a small village in the City Municipality of Koper in the Littoral region of Slovenia.

The small church in the settlement is dedicated to Saint Rufus and belongs to the Parish of Truške.
