= Luža, Trebnje =

Luža
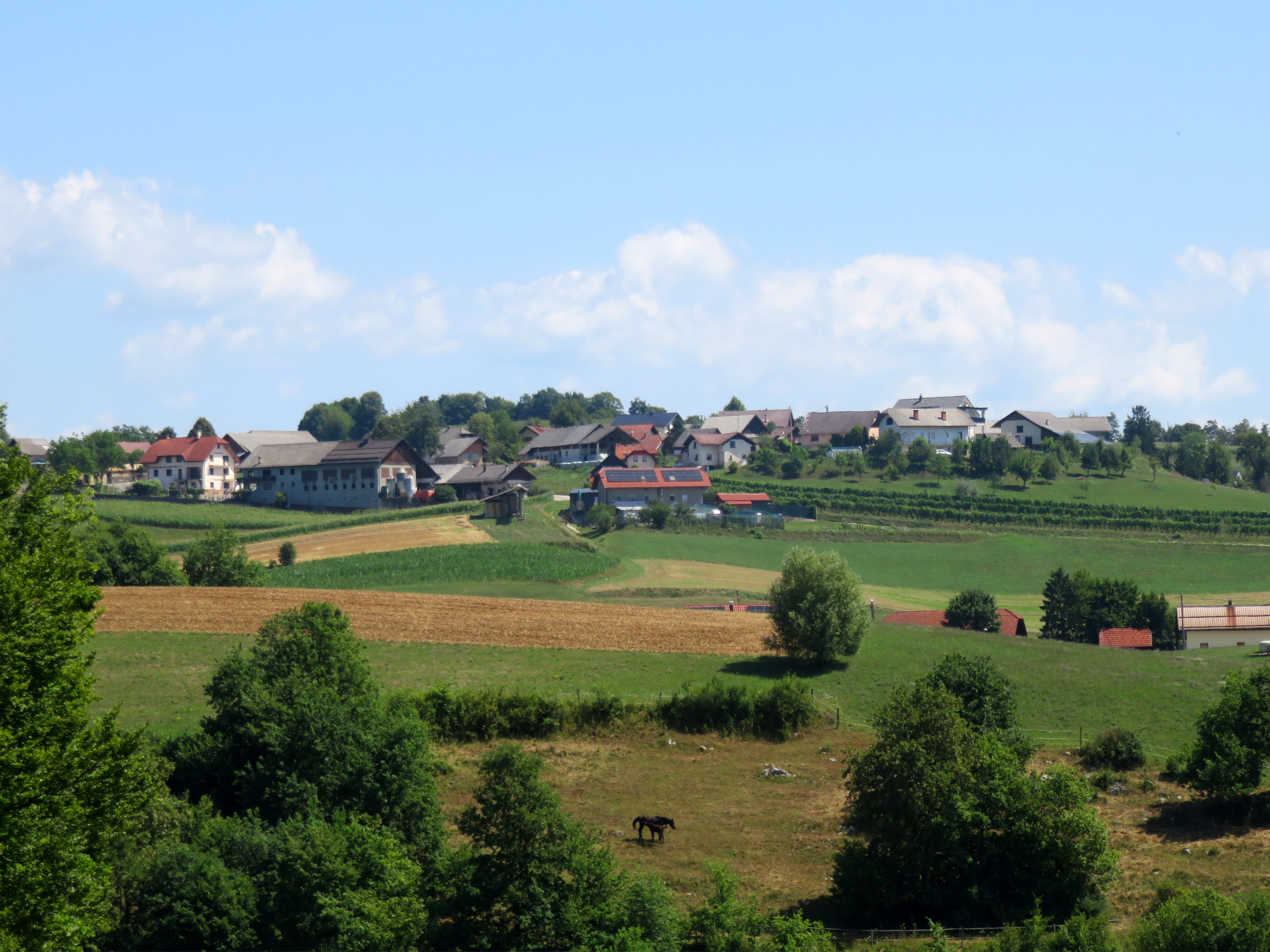

- Location in Slovenia
- Coordinates: 45°54′13.04″N 14°57′22.68″E
- Country: Slovenia
- Traditional region: Lower Carniola
- Statistical region: Southeast Slovenia
- Municipality: Trebnje

Area
  - Total: 0.56 km^{2} (0.22 sq mi)
- Elevation: 336.9 m (1,105 ft)

Population (2002)
  - Total: 58

Luža (pronounced [ˈluːʒa], German: Lacken) is a small settlement near Trebnje in eastern Slovenia. The Municipality of Trebnje is part of the historical region of Lower Carniola and is now included in the Southeast Slovenia Statistical Region.

== Name ==
Luža was attested in historical sources as Lakken in 1444, Lakhen in 1471, and Lusach in 1507. The Slovene name Luža comes from the Slovene common noun luža 'pond, pool, puddle', referring to a local geographical feature. The German name Lacken is believed to be of similar origin (cf. German Lache 'pool, puddle').
