= Log, Sevnica =

Log
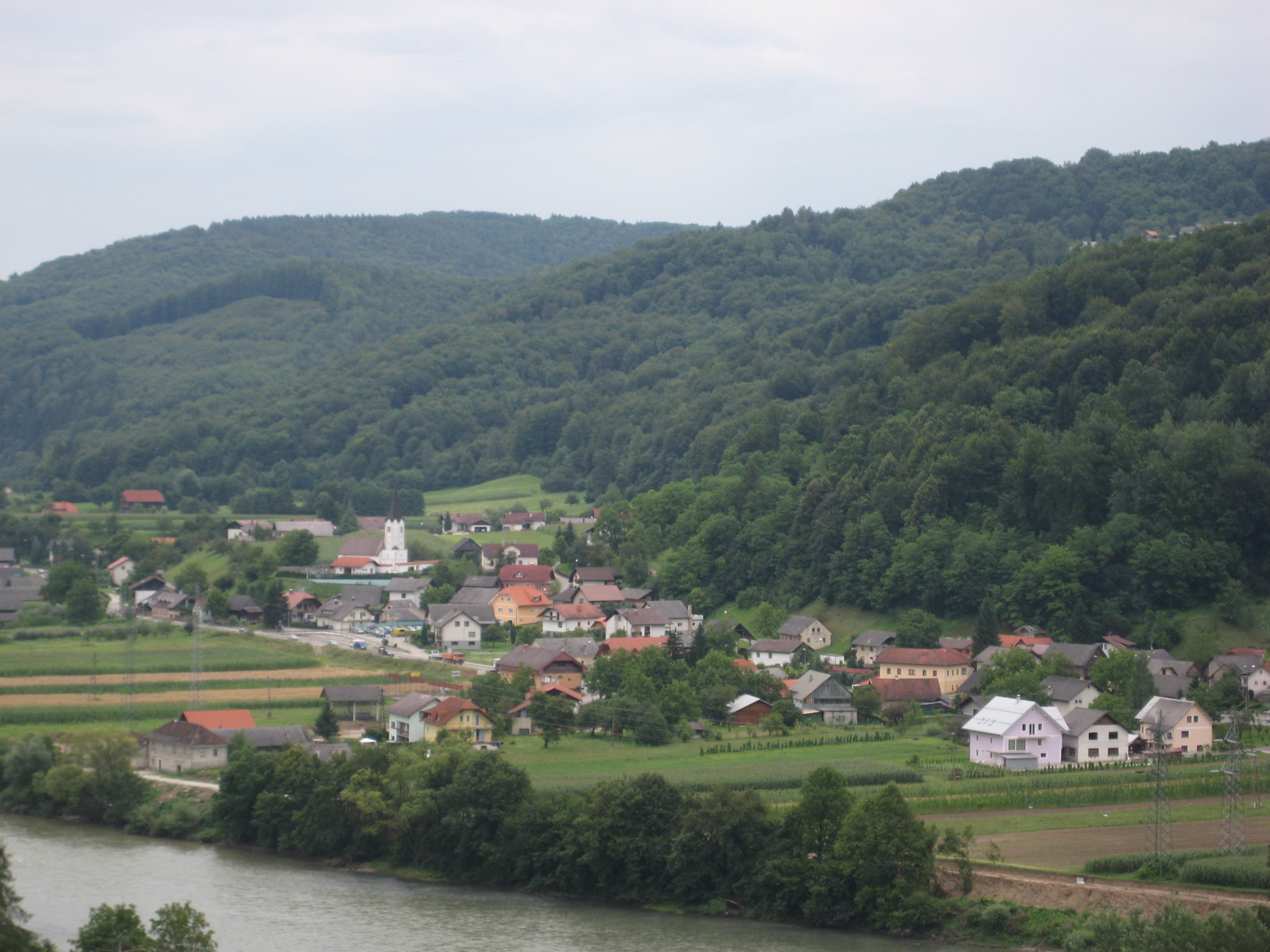

- Location in Slovenia
- Coordinates: 46°0′7.73″N 15°19′19.2″E
- Country: Slovenia
- Traditional region: Lower Carniola
- Statistical region: Lower Sava
- Municipality: Sevnica

Area
  - Total: 2.85 km^{2} (1.10 sq mi)
- Elevation: 179.1 m (588 ft)

Population (2014)
  - Total: 331

Log (pronounced [ˈloːk]; German: Auen) is a village on the right bank of the Sava River in the Municipality of Sevnica in eastern Slovenia. The area is part of the historical region of Lower Carniola. The municipality is now included in the Lower Sava Statistical Region.

== History ==
Lead ore was mined near the village in 1890. During the Second World War, in the fall of 1941, the German authorities deported the population of the village and settled Gottschee Germans there.

=== Mass grave ===
Log is the site of a mass grave associated with the Second World War. The Boštanj Mass Grave (Slovene: Grobišče Boštanj)—also known as the Boštanj Quarry Mass Grave (Grobišče Kamnolom Boštanj) or Log Mass Grave (Grobišče Log)—is located south of the settlement, next to an electrical transformer by a quarry. Different sources state that the grave contains the remains of either 14 German soldiers or 200 to 300 Ustaša soldiers.

== Church ==
The local church is dedicated to the Holy Cross (Slovene: Sveti Križ) and belongs to the Parish of Boštanj. It is a medieval building with a 12th-century Romanesque portal preserved in the nave. The belfry and choir are late 17th- and early 18th-century additions.
