= Lašče, Žužemberk =

Lašče
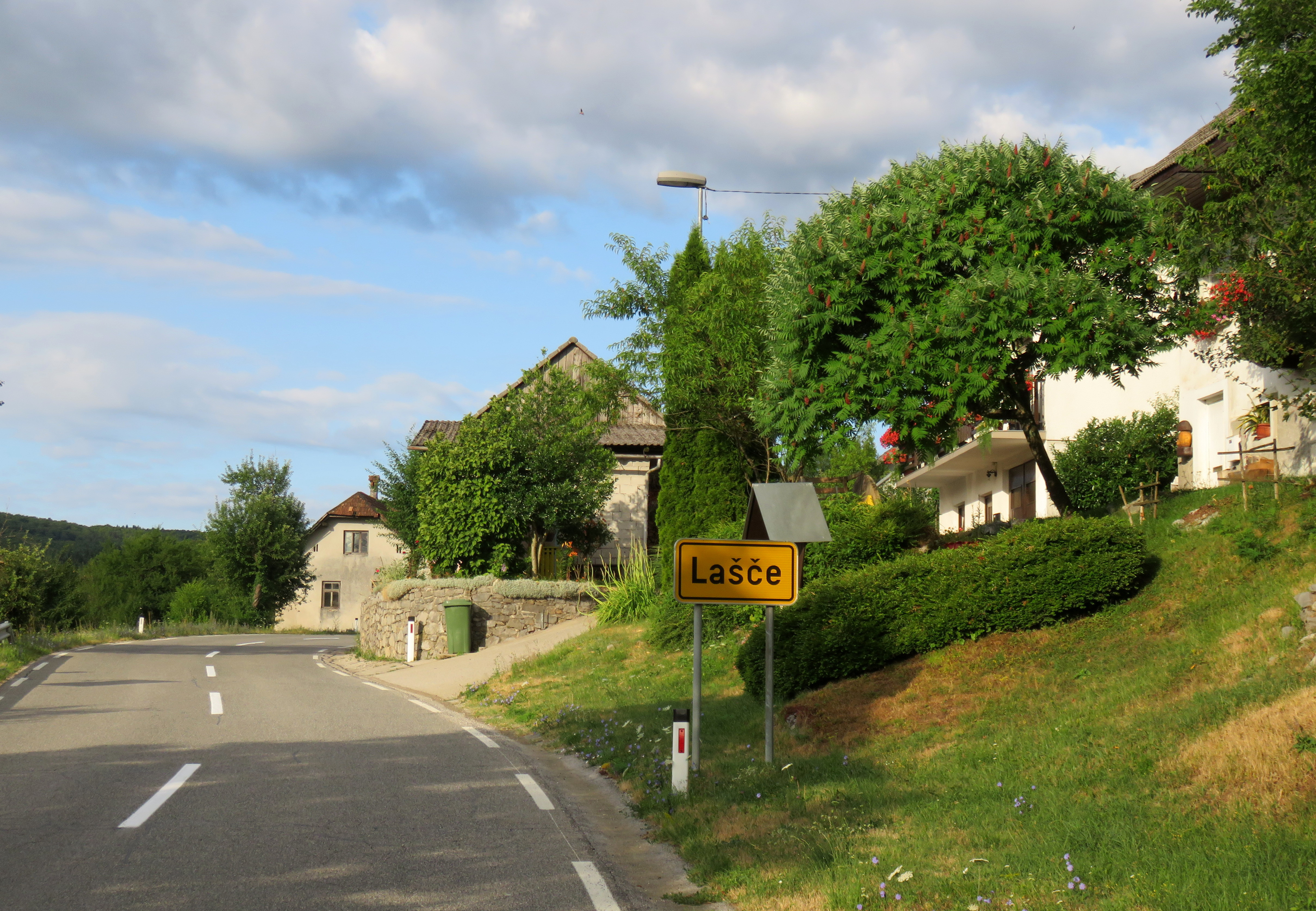

- Location in Slovenia
- Coordinates: 45°47′32.01″N 14°56′52.42″E
- Country: Slovenia
- Traditional region: Lower Carniola
- Statistical region: Southeast Slovenia
- Municipality: Žužemberk

Area
  - Total: 10.75 km^{2} (4.15 sq mi)
- Elevation: 374.8 m (1,230 ft)

Population (2002)
  - Total: 64

Lašče (pronounced [ˈlaːʃtʃɛ], in older sources Lašiče, German: Laschitz) is a small village in the hills south of Dvor in the Municipality of Žužemberk in southeastern Slovenia. The area is part of the historical region of Lower Carniola. The municipality is now included in the Southeast Slovenia Statistical Region.

== Church ==
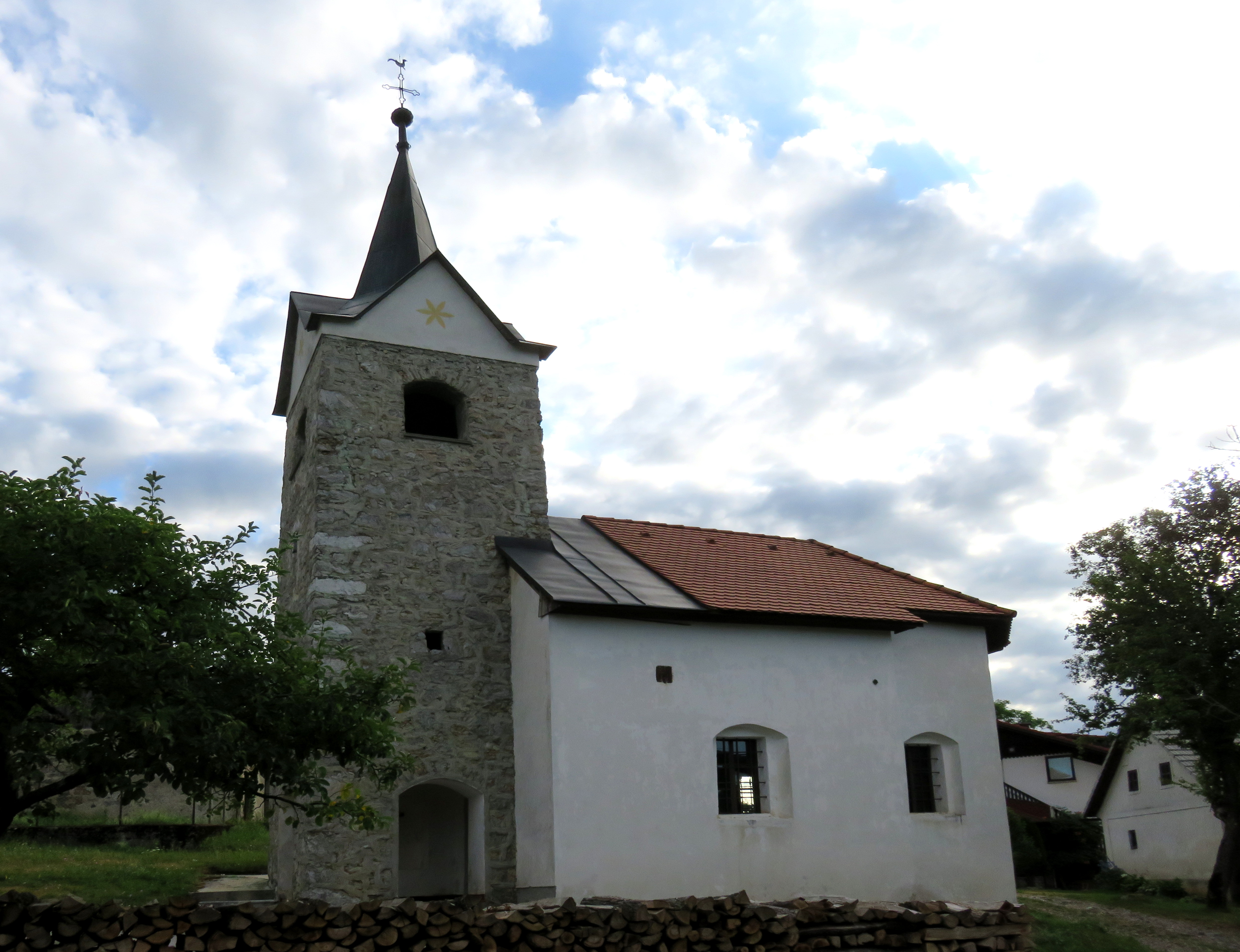
Saints Primus and Felician Church

The local church is dedicated to Saints Primus and Felician and belongs to the Parish of Žužemberk. It was built in the early 19th century to replace an older church on a different location above the village. Seventeenth-century church furnishings from the original are preserved in this newer building.
