= Liplje, Kamnik =

Liplje
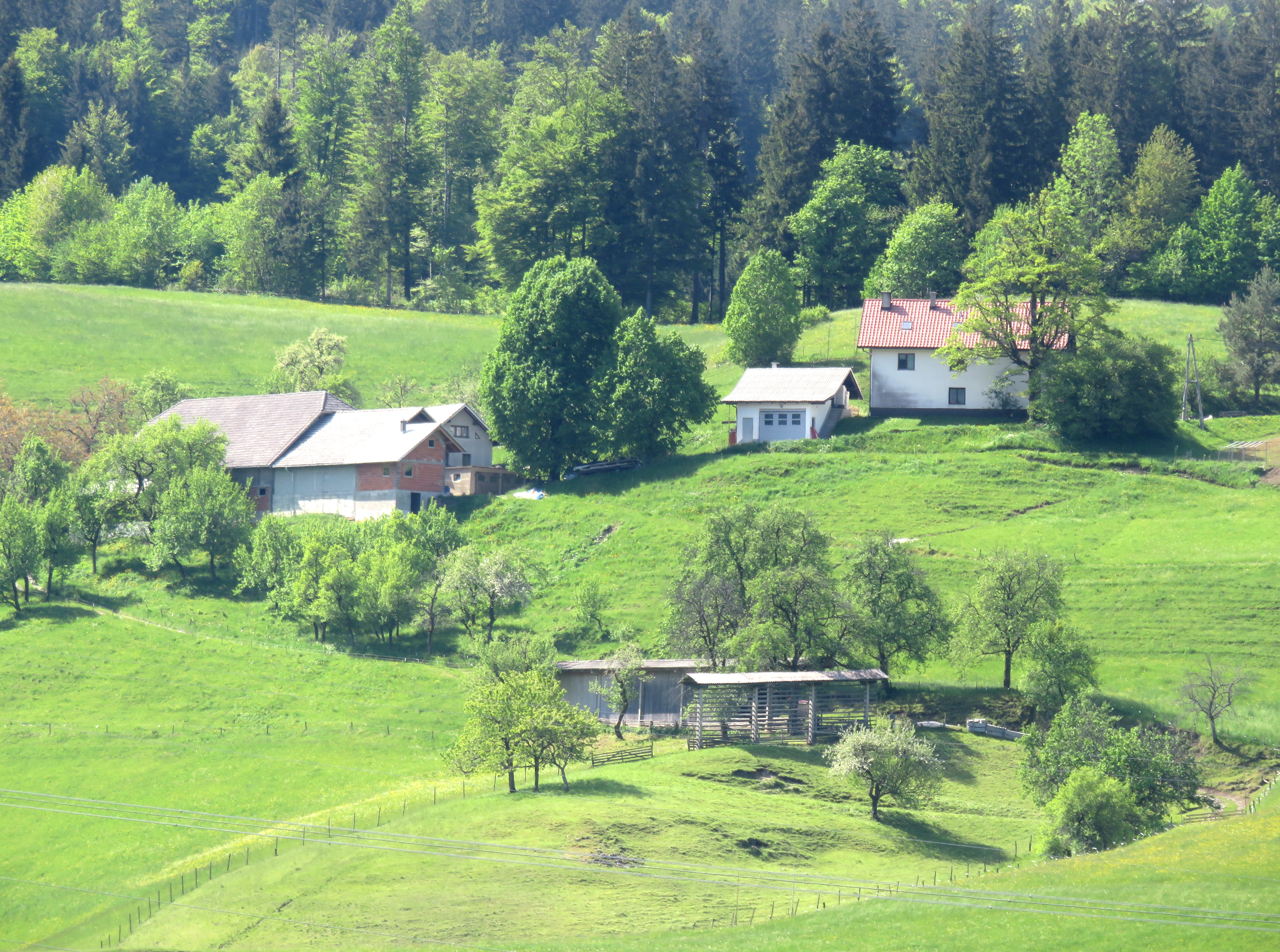
- The Pecman farm in Liplje

- Location in Slovenia
- Coordinates: 46°12′40.83″N 14°47′30.23″E
- Country: Slovenia
- Traditional region: Upper Carniola
- Statistical region: Central Slovenia
- Municipality: Kamnik

Area
  - Total: 2.24 km^{2} (0.86 sq mi)
- Elevation: 703.5 m (2,308 ft)

Population (2002)
  - Total: 18

Liplje (pronounced [ˈliːpljɛ]) is a small settlement in the Municipality of Kamnik in the Upper Carniola region of Slovenia.
