= Leskovica, Gorenja Vas–Poljane =

Leskovica
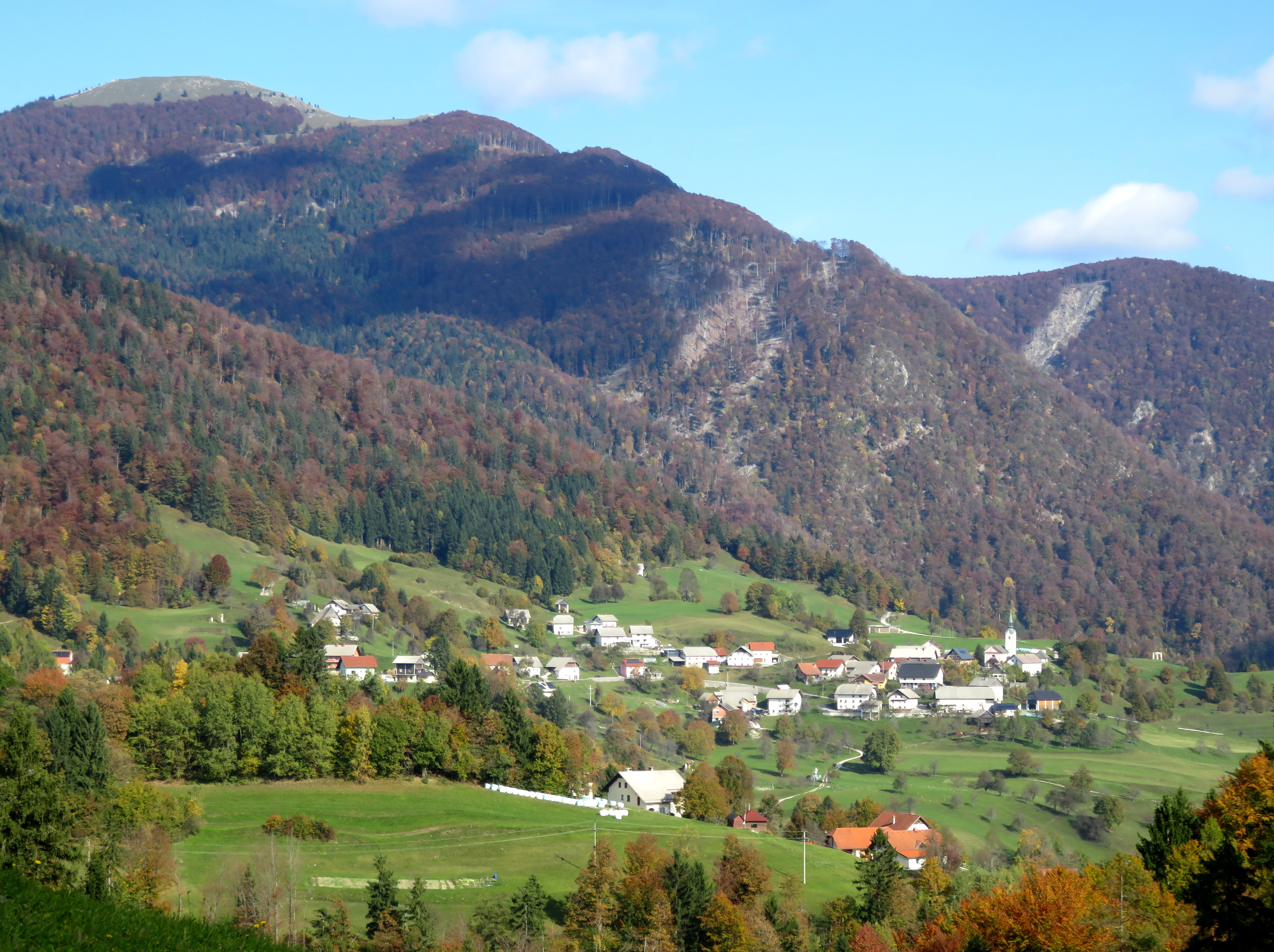

- Location in Slovenia
- Coordinates: 46°8′50.39″N 14°5′7.05″E
- Country: Slovenia
- Traditional region: Upper Carniola
- Statistical region: Upper Carniola
- Municipality: Gorenja Vas–Poljane

Area
  - Total: 7.36 km^{2} (2.84 sq mi)
- Elevation: 795.6 m (2,610 ft)

Population (2020)
  - Total: 93
  - Density: 13/km^{2} (33/sq mi)

Leskovica (pronounced [lɛˈskɔːʋitsa] or [lɛˈskoːʋitsa]; German: Leskouza) is a village in the Municipality of Gorenja Vas–Poljane in the Upper Carniola region of Slovenia. It is around 35 kilometers (22 mi) northwest of Ljubljana.

== Name ==
Like similar place names (e.g., Leskovec, Leščevje, and Leše), the name Leskovica is derived from the Slovene common noun leska 'hazel', referring to the local vegetation.

== Church ==
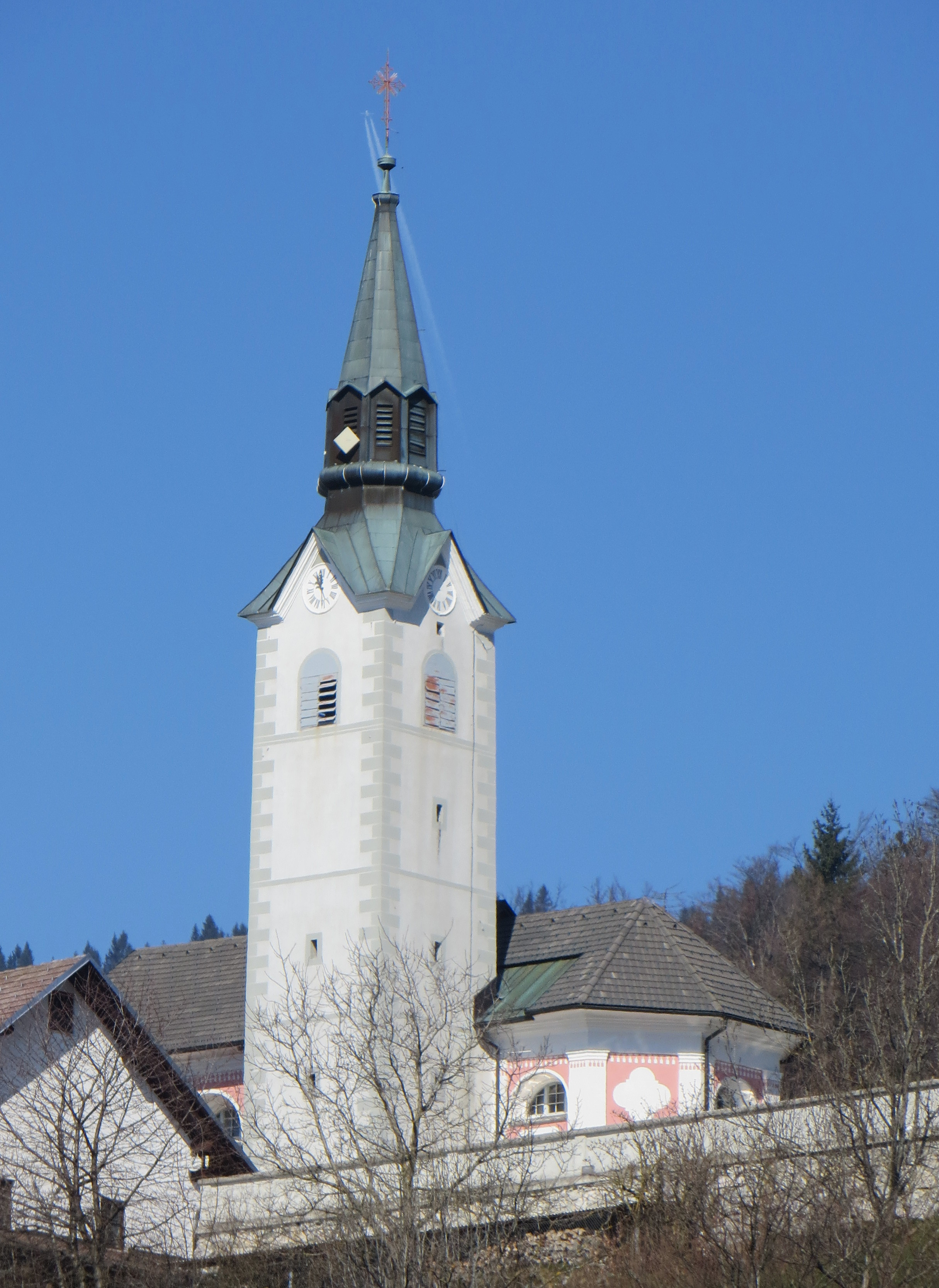
View from southeast

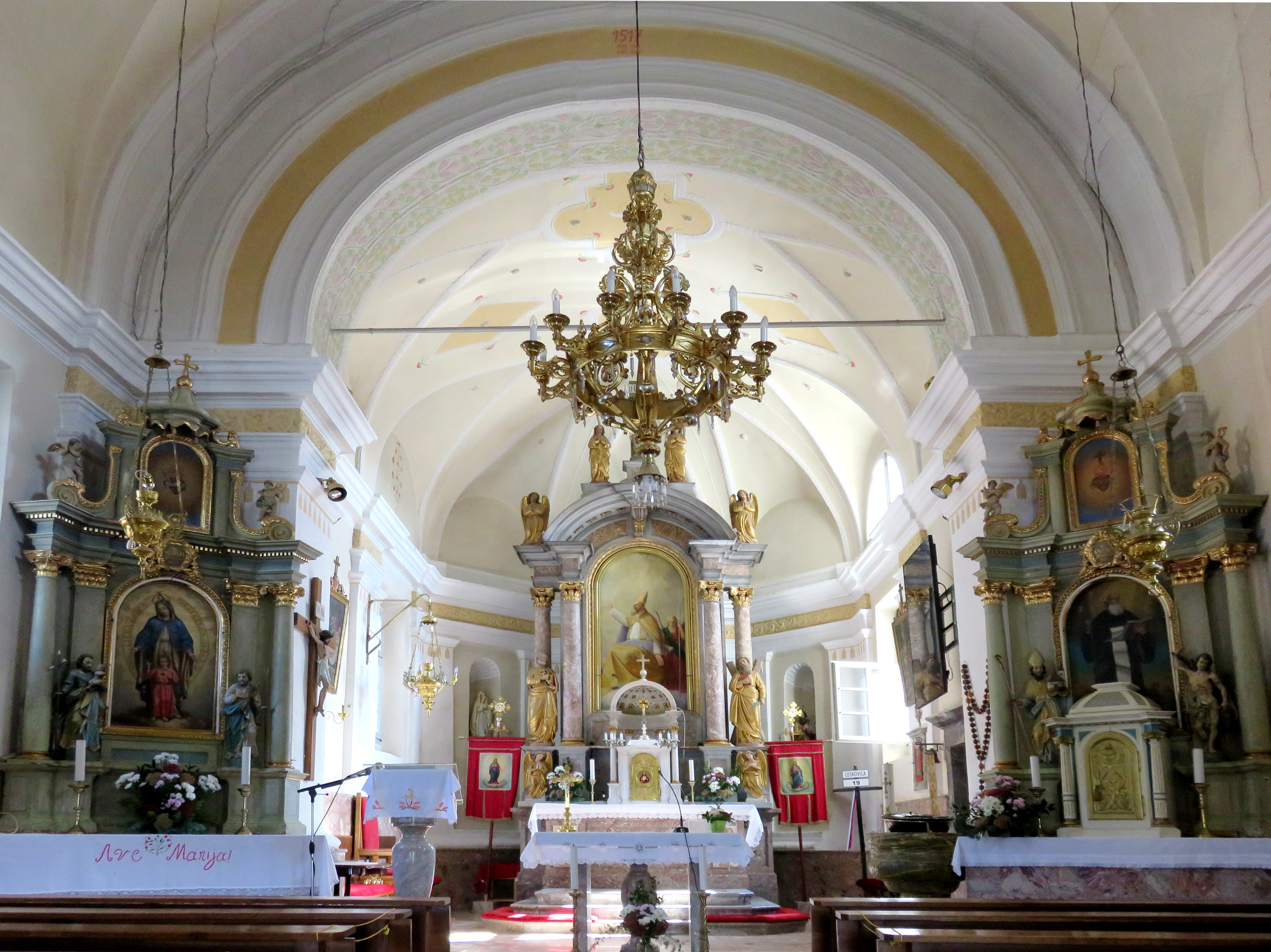
Church interior

Saint Ulrich's Church

The local church is dedicated to Saint Ulrich (Slovene: sveti Urh). The original Late Gothic church was dedicated by the Bishop of Aquileia in 1517. The current church is of the same size, but dates to the late 17th century. It has a rectangular vaulted nave with an angular apse. The main altar dates to the late 19th century. The altar painting of Saint Ulrich is an early work by the Slovene Impressionist painter Ivan Grohar.
