= Leše, Litija =

Leše
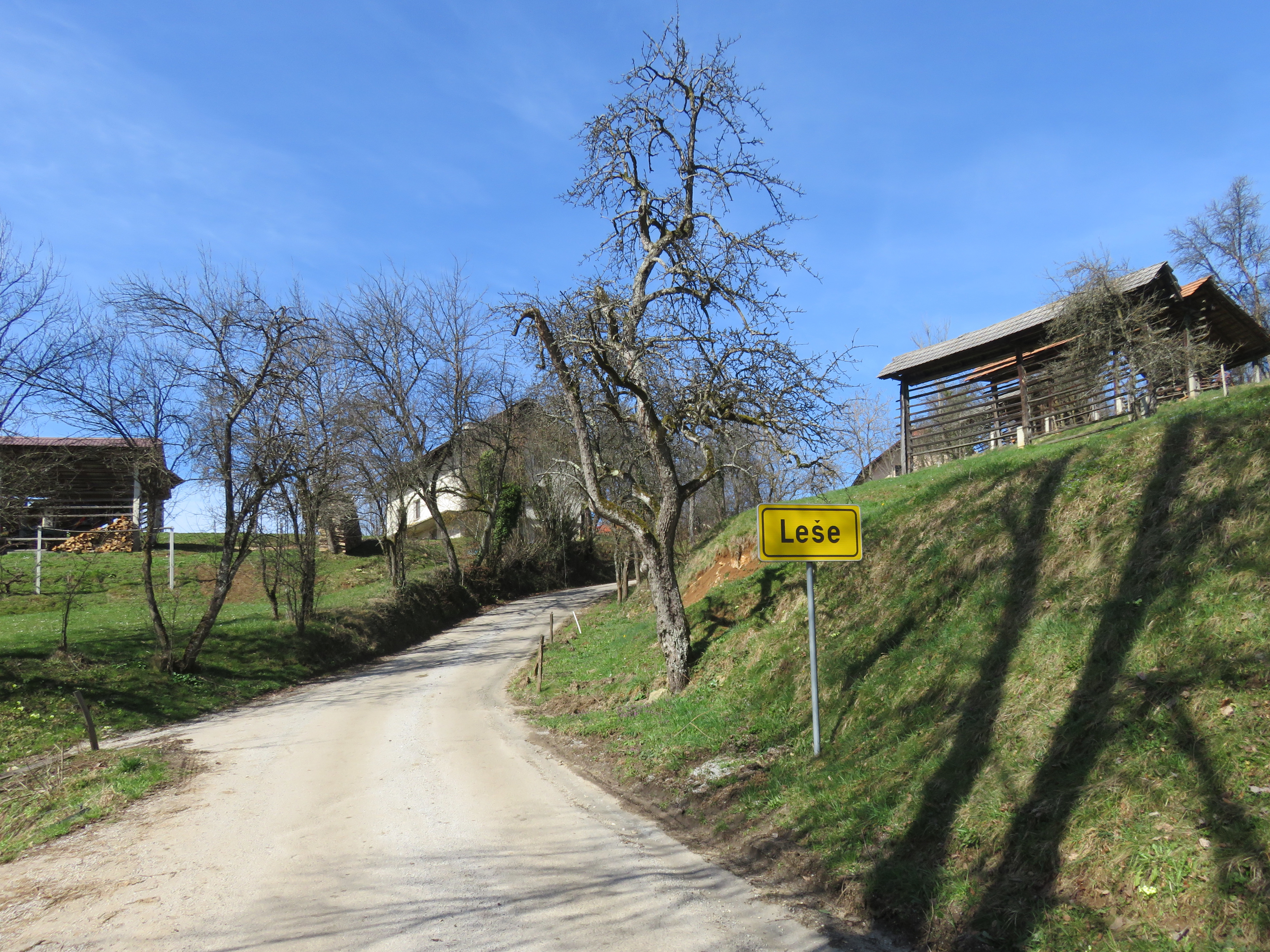

- Location in Slovenia
- Coordinates: 46°5′57.06″N 14°53′3.73″E
- Country: Slovenia
- Traditional region: Upper Carniola
- Statistical region: Central Sava
- Municipality: Litija

Area
  - Total: 1.61 km^{2} (0.62 sq mi)
- Elevation: 471 m (1,545 ft)

Population (2002)
  - Total: 32
- Postal code: 1282

Leše (pronounced [ˈleːʃɛ]) is a small village to the north above Sava in the Municipality of Litija in central Slovenia. The area is part of the traditional region of Upper Carniola. It is now included with the rest of the municipality in the Central Sava Statistical Region.
