= Loče, Brežice =

Loče
- Location in Slovenia
- Coordinates: 45°51′2.39″N 15°38′0.59″E
- Country: Slovenia
- Traditional region: Styria
- Statistical region: Lower Sava
- Municipality: Brežice

Area
  - Total: 3.6 km^{2} (1.4 sq mi)
- Elevation: 326.6 m (1,072 ft)

Population (2020)
  - Total: 184
  - Density: 51/km^{2} (130/sq mi)

Loče (pronounced [ˈloːtʃɛ]; in older sources also Loč, German: Lotsch) is a village on the left bank of the Sava River in the Municipality of Brežice in eastern Slovenia. The area is part of the traditional region of Lower Styria and the settlement was the southernmost settlement in the Duchy of Styria. It is now included in the Lower Sava Statistical Region.
