= Lipnik, Trebnje =

Lipnik
- Location in Slovenia
- Coordinates: 45°54′41.47″N 15°4′41.65″E
- Country: Slovenia
- Traditional region: Lower Carniola
- Statistical region: Southeast Slovenia
- Municipality: Trebnje

Area
  - Total: 1.03 km^{2} (0.40 sq mi)
- Elevation: 410.2 m (1,346 ft)

Population (2002)
  - Total: 6

Lipnik (pronounced [ˈliːpnik]) is a small settlement in the Municipality of Trebnje in eastern Slovenia. The municipality is included in the Southeast Slovenia Statistical Region. The entire area is part of the historical region of Lower Carniola.
