= Lipovec, Ribnica =

Lipovec
- Location in Slovenia
- Coordinates: 45°43′40.98″N 14°44′14.54″E
- Country: Slovenia
- Traditional region: Lower Carniola
- Statistical region: Southeast Slovenia
- Municipality: Ribnica

Area
  - Total: 1.25 km^{2} (0.48 sq mi)
- Elevation: 489.3 m (1,605 ft)

Population (2019)
  - Total: 148
- Postal code: 1310

Lipovec (pronounced [ˈliːpɔʋəts]; German: Lipowitz) is a small village east of Dolenja Vas in the Municipality of Ribnica in southern Slovenia. The area is part of the traditional region of Lower Carniola and is now included in the Southeast Slovenia Statistical Region.

A small chapel-shrine in the centre of the settlement is dedicated to the Virgin Mary and was built around 1930.
