= Lipa, Beltinci =

Lipa
- Location in Slovenia
- Coordinates: 46°36′11.83″N 16°17′13.96″E
- Country: Slovenia
- Traditional region: Prekmurje
- Statistical region: Mura
- Municipality: Beltinci

Area
  - Total: 5.59 km^{2} (2.16 sq mi)
- Elevation: 172.7 m (567 ft)

Population (2026)
  - Total: 578
  - Density: 103/km^{2} (270/sq mi)

Lipa (pronounced [ˈliːpa]; Hungarian: Kislippa) is a village in the Municipality of Beltinci in the Prekmurje region of northeastern Slovenia. In January 2026, the population was 578.
