= Mlaka, Radovljica =

Mlaka
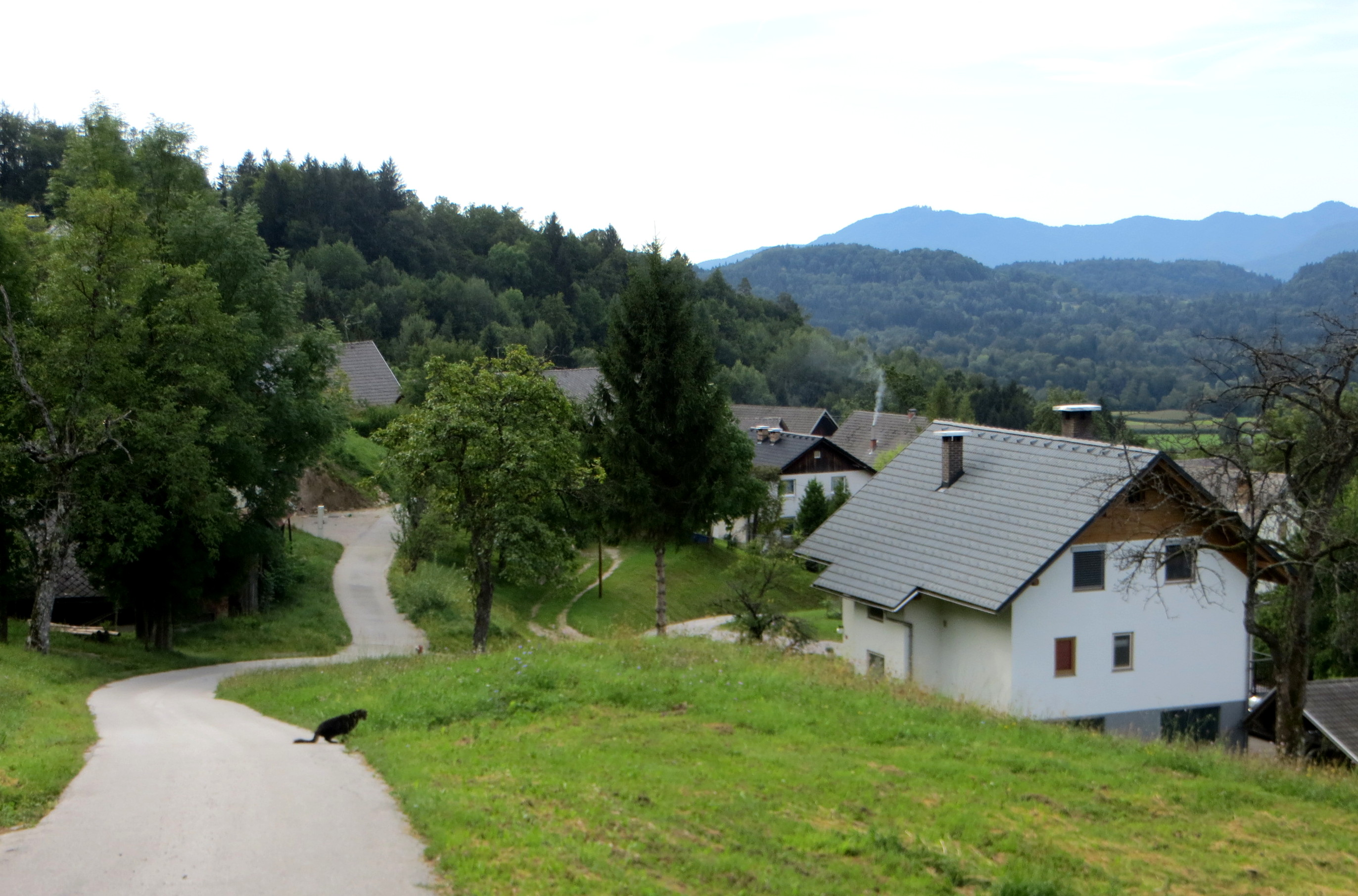

- Location in Slovenia
- Coordinates: 46°21′32.07″N 14°14′22.33″E
- Country: Slovenia
- Traditional region: Upper Carniola
- Statistical region: Upper Carniola
- Municipality: Radovljica
- Elevation: 543.8 m (1,784 ft)

Population (2002)
  - Total: 22

Mlaka (pronounced [ˈmlaːka]) is a small village off the road from Begunje na Gorenjskem to Tržič in the Municipality of Radovljica in the Upper Carniola region of Slovenia.

== Geography ==
Mlaka lies on the southwest slope of Mount Dobrča (1,634 meters or 5,361 feet). It is the smallest and lowest-elevation settlement among the four villages (Slatna, Srednja Vas, Zadnja Vas, and Mlaka) collectively known as Pod gorami (literally, 'below the mountains') on the slope.
