= Fuggerau =

Coordinates: 46.548147°N 13.693514°E

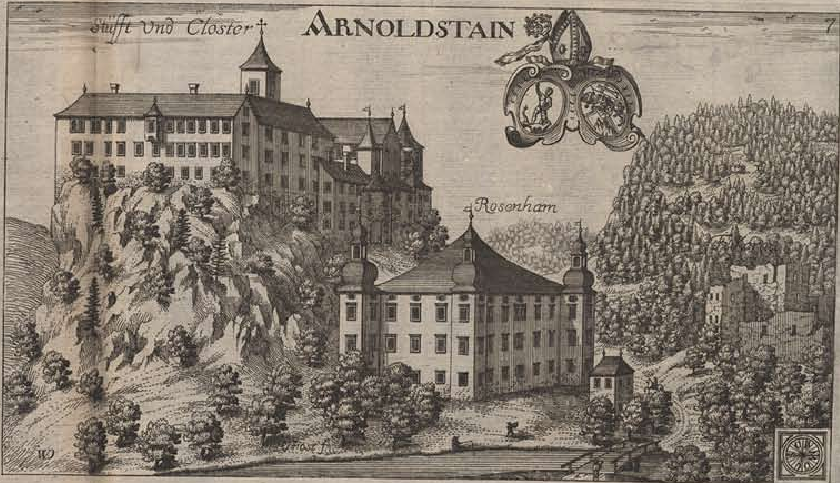
1688 view of Arnoldstein by Valvasor - to the left is the Abbey, in the middle is Schloss Rosenheim, to the right the 'Ruine Fuggerau'

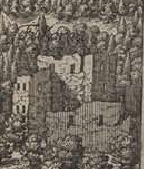
Detail

The Fuggerau was a mining and ore-smelting facility near Arnoldstein in Carinthia, Austria. It was probably set up by the Fugger family, though the name 'Fugger' was already in evidence in the area before 1495 without any links to that family.

== History ==
It was set up by the brothers Ulrich, Georg and Jakob in 1495 on lands that they had acquired from Arnoldstein Abbey. This was done with the express permission of the Bishopric of Bamberg, in which the Abbey fell and with whom the Fuggers already had business dealings thanks to their presence in Franconia. The family was granted water rights, landowner rights, fortification rights, all the pledge-service that the abbey owed to the Bishopric, the right to cut down trees at will and to hunt and fish within certain limits, in return for the Abbey being compensated for its pledge-service. These rights were extended in 1496. The Fuggers were also allowed to exercise lower-court rights at the Schloss Rosenheim, though high-court rights remained with the 'vicedom' of Carinthia.

The complex was a combination of separating-works, a hammer mill and cannon foundry, turning out 261 cannon in 1504 as well as the heavy guns used to arm the complex's own fortress. Metal smelting occurred within the walls of the fortress and brass hammering in the valley, since it needed water power, probably from the River Gailitz. The Fuggerau was in the right place to work not only locally-mined ore but also ores from Upper Hungary for the Venetian market. According to Pölnitz the gold worked there came from the Klieming (a misspelling of Kliening). Copper worked there was mainly meant for Venice - between 1495 and 1504, 50,000 Venetian hundredweight of copper and 22,000 Viennese silver-marks were spent in Venice. Between 1527 and 1546 thirty-three lead pipes were made at the Fuggerau as well as at Bleiberg, where the Fuggers were also involved. The lead supply from Schwaz also went to the Fuggerau for processing.

The first 'factor' employed by the Fuggers was Hans Fugger vom Reh, a cousin of Jacob the Rich. Hans died at the Fuggerau in 1503 and was followed by Georg Fugger's son in law Christoph Hering and then by Jobst Zeller, who was dismissed after being blamed for the Venetian seizure of guns from the Fuggerau during the War of the League of Cambrai. In 1537 Gastel Fugger vom Reh became factor.

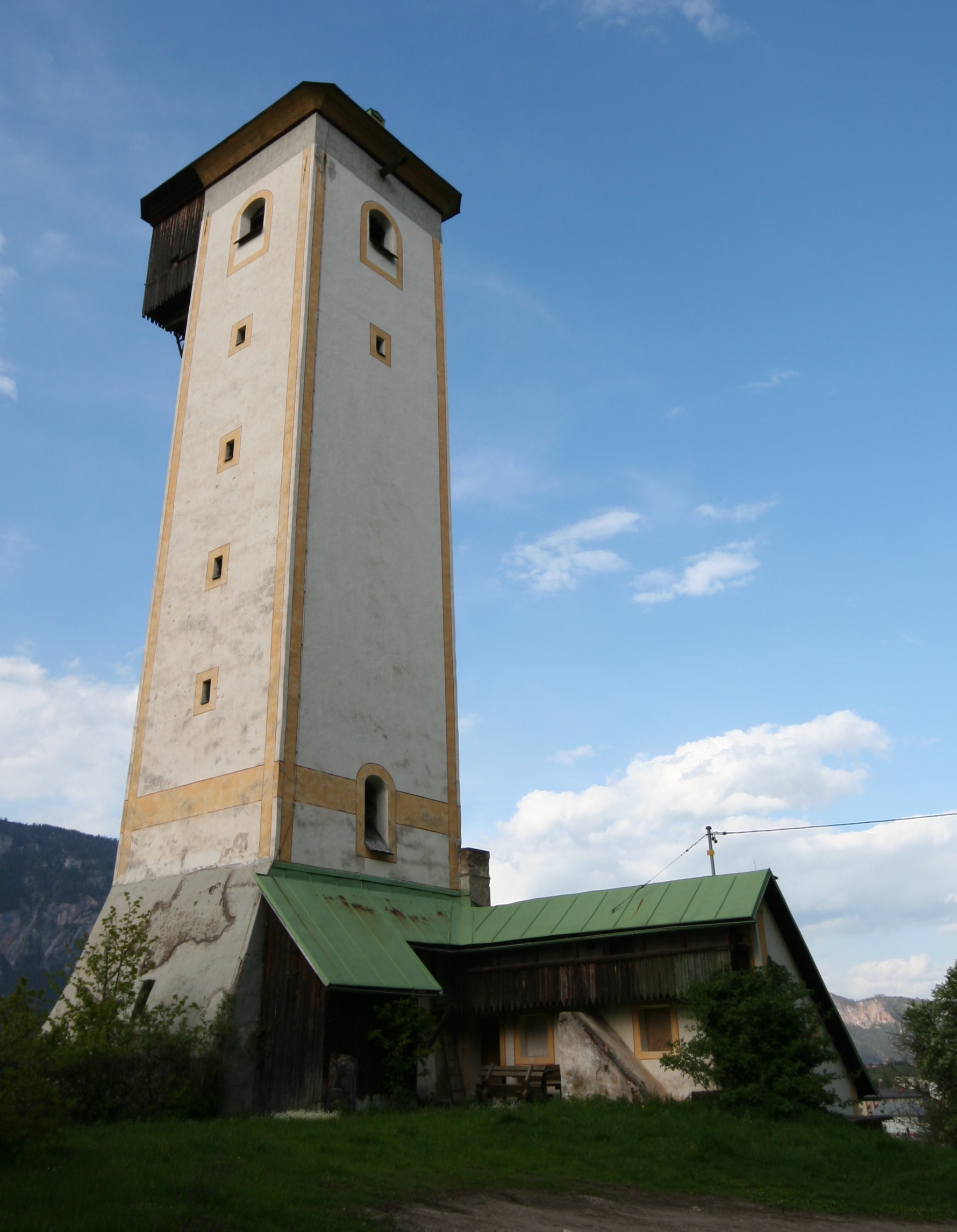
The Schrotturm Gailitz at the Fuggerau

Brass was only hammered at the complex under 1530 and from 1547 onwards the family began to retreat from the Hungarian mining industry and to concentrate on domestically-mined ores, which left the Fuggerau with less and less importance. The brothers Marx and Hans Fugger sold the Fuggerau, all its properties and rights and even its equipment and furniture back to the Abbey in 1570 for 2500 guilders during the abbacy of Petrus von Arnoldstein. The buildings fell into ruin and the local population forgot the name 'Fuggerau' - in 1688 the ruins are shown in a view by Valvasor. The Schrotturm Gailitz was built on the ruins in 1814, before being replaced by another tower of the same name in 1830, which operated until 1974 and still survives today.
