= Friuli earthquake =

Friuli earthquake may refer to:

- 1348 Friuli earthquake, Italy
- 1976 Friuli earthquake, Italy
