= Srednja Vas, Radovljica =

Srednja Vas
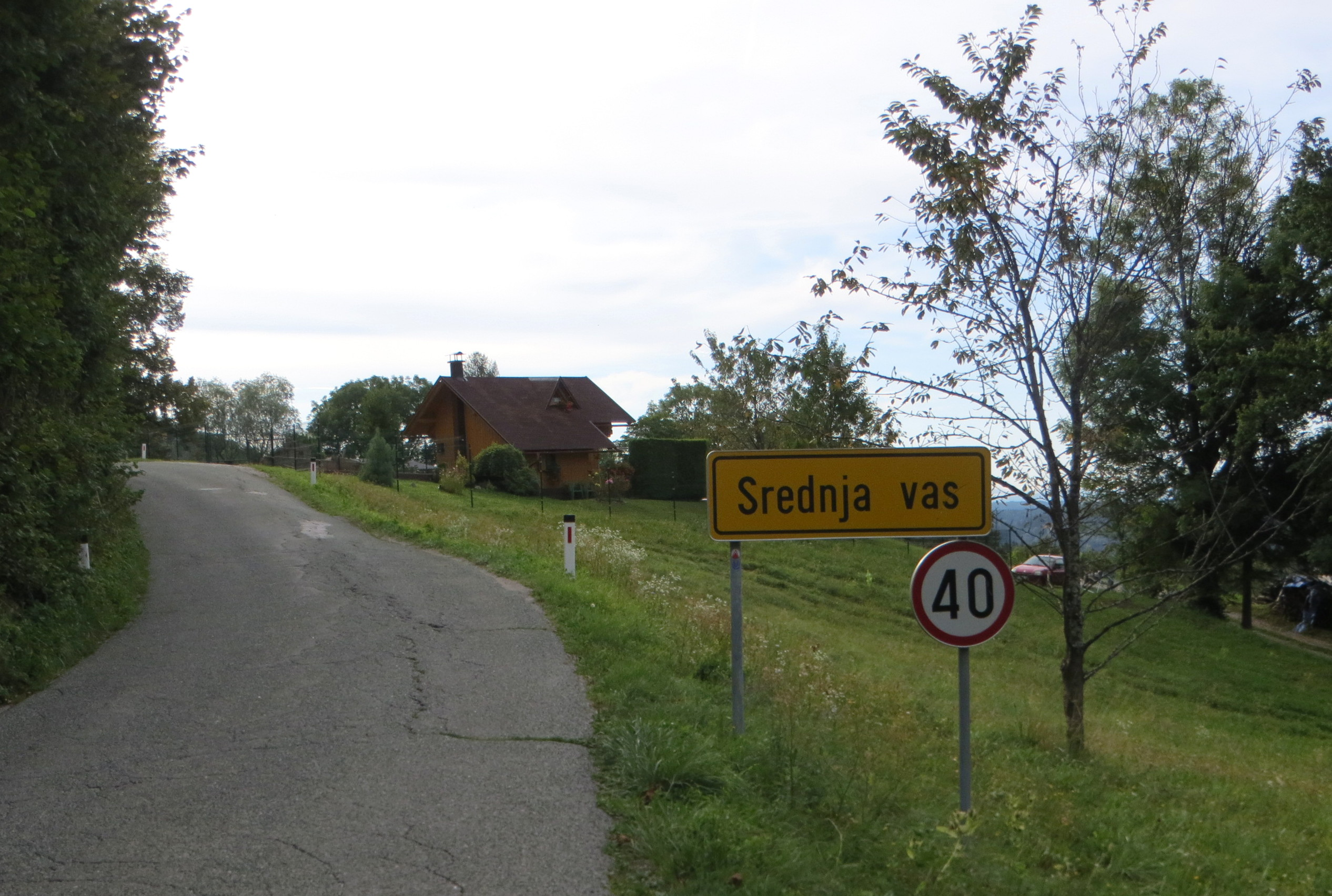

- Location in Slovenia
- Coordinates: 46°21′49.48″N 14°14′10.39″E
- Country: Slovenia
- Region: Upper Carniola
- Statistical region: Upper Carniola
- Municipality: Radovljica
- Elevation: 625.9 m (2,053 ft)

Population (2002)
  - Total: 23

Srednja Vas (pronounced [ˈsɾeːdnja ˈʋaːs]; Slovene: Srednja vas) is a small settlement above Begunje in the Municipality of Radovljica in the Upper Carniola region of Slovenia.

== Geography ==
Srednja Vas lies on the southwest slope of Mount Dobrča (1,634 meters or 5,361 feet). It is the highest-elevation settlement among the four villages (Slatna, Srednja Vas, Zadnja Vas, and Mlaka) collectively known as Pod gorami (literally, 'below the mountains') on the slope.

== Name ==
The name Srednja vas literally means 'middle village'. Srednja vas and names like it (e.g., Srednje) indicate that the settlement lay in some sort of central or middle position between two larger settlements. The name is unrelated to names derived from sreda 'Wednesday' (e.g., Središče ob Dravi).
