= 1511 Idrija earthquake =

Disastrous earthquake in early modern Slovenia

- Location within Alps
- Local date: March 26, 1511
- Local time: 15:30
- Magnitude: 6.9 M_{w}
- Epicenter: 46.2°N 13.43°E
- Total damage: Severe
- Max. intensity: EMS-98 X (Very destructive)
- Tsunami: Yes
- Casualties: ~3,000 dead

The 1511 Idrija earthquake (Slovene: idrijski potres or potres na Idrijskem) occurred on 26 March 1511 with a moment magnitude of 6.9 and a maximum EMS intensity of X (very destructive). The epicenter was near the town of Idrija (now in Slovenia), although some place it in Friuli. The earthquake affected a large territory between Carinthia, Friuli, present-day Slovenia and Croatia. An estimated 3,000 people were killed and damage was considered severe. The earthquake was felt as far as in Switzerland and present-day Slovakia. A number of castles and churches were razed to the ground in a large area from northeast Italy to western Croatia.

== Tectonic setting ==
The area affected by the earthquake lies within the Julian Alps, close to the border between Italy and Slovenia. The ongoing convergence between the African plate and Eurasian plate leads to active faulting in this part of the Alps. The type of faulting varies from thrust faulting in the west of the area, in the Southern Alps to dextral (right lateral) strike-slip faulting to the east, in the Dinaric Alps.

== Earthquake ==
Several large earthquakes have been described as occurring before, during or after the 1511 event. Reanalysis of contemporary records has, however, reduced the number of events. A possible foreshock in 1510 has been attributed to errors introduced in sources written well after the event. Two main shocks on the same day, relying on separate Italian and Slovenian sources have been reconciled as local time in Italy in the 16th century was counted from sunset, not midnight and a single event is now accepted. Modelling of possible earthquake sources compared to the distribution of damage also supports a single event. Another earthquake said to have affected the area on August 8, 1511, has also been discounted due to a lack of any evidence in contemporary sources.

The Idrija earthquake occurred at about 15:00–15:30 local time on March 26, 1511. The magnitude of the event has been estimated from the distribution of seismic intensities to be about 6.9 M_{w}. A lower magnitude of M_{w} 6.3 has been estimated, based on a revision of the intensities, particularly in Slovenia.

The causative fault remains uncertain, although modelling of expected seismic intensities from different potential fault sources has shown that strike-slip faulting along a NW–SE trending fault gives the best match to the observations. Trenching across two of the larger dextral strike-slip faults, the Idrija Fault and the Predjama Fault have found evidence for past earthquakes but in neither case are the dates consistent with the timing of the 1511 event. Trenching has also been carried out on the ~25 km long Borgo Faris–Cividale Fault and the associated Colle Villano Thrust. These investigations found evidence for two events, the most recent of which occurred in the 15th to 17th century period, consistent with the 1511 event. The length of the fault zone is also consistent with the proposed lower magnitude estimate of 6.3.

=== Aftershocks ===
Eyewitness accounts mention a prolonged series of aftershocks lasting for several weeks and up to a year after the mainshock. Further earthquakes were noted on March 28, April 19, May 15, June 5, June 6, June 24, June 25 and October 3.

== Damage ==
=== Context ===
Descriptions of the damage caused by the 1511 earthquake in contemporary and later sources are complicated by other historical events that affected the area at about the same time. This was a period of great upheaval due to a series of battles between the League of Cambrai and Venetian forces that led to the eventual defeat of the Venetians. This, together with earlier raids by Turkish forces, may have caused significant damage that was later interpreted as due to the earthquake. At the same time the area was affected by disease and famine, complicating casualty estimates. Two important contemporary records come from Jurij von Egkh, the imperial representative for the Hapsburgs in Carniola, and the Venetian historian and diarist Marino Sanudo.

=== Effects ===
The earthquake has become known as the Idrija earthquake as later sources attributed a high level of damage to this mining town. There is, however, no evidence of significant earthquake damage in Idrija in contemporary accounts, possibly reflecting the fact that almost all of the buildings were built of wood. A major landslide in Idrija that dammed a stream and flooded the mercury mine happened at around the period of the earthquake but there is no evidence that directly links the two events.

The town of Bovec was said to have been devastated. The Predel road was blocked by a major landslide. At Tolmin two castles were destroyed, there was also damage at Čedad (Cividale del Friuli), Beljak (Villach), Krmin (Cormons), Gradisca d'Isonzo, Monfalcone and Gorizia. Many other castles suffered significant damage, including those at Bled, Divja Loka (near Škofja Loka), Duplje, Glanz, Gutenburg, Hošperk (near Planina), Hudi, Kamen, one of the castles in Kamnik, Neuberg, Prežek (in Gorjance), Smlednik, Šteberk, Turjak and Udine. Several major buildings were badly damaged in Ljubljana. The regional palace used by Carniola officials was rendered uninhabitable. The monastery of the Teutonic Knights was badly damaged. The Vicedom's palace and other solidly constructed houses were also badly affected. The city walls partially collapsed and many of the towers were badly damaged. In Friuli the most severe damage was at Čedad, Humin and Osovka. Polhov Gradec, Škofja Loka, Smlednik, Kamnik, Tržič, Postojna and in places outside the current Slovenian borders. Some damage was reported from Trieste in contemporary accounts and evidence has recently been discovered of significant damage in Piran. Further afield, in Zagreb, damage was significant enough that residents were exempted from taxes for three years.

=== Tsunami ===
Some later accounts of the earthquake have suggested that it triggered a significant tsunami. The earthquake's epicenter was well onshore, but some onshore earthquakes do trigger submarine landslides that can cause tsunamis. The re-examination of contemporary accounts have failed to find any support for a tsunami, with damage to defensive towers in Trieste being instead attributed to the effects of bombardment of the port by Venetian forces in 1508.

== Aftermath ==
Some of the castles, such as Divja Loka were abandoned, in some cases, such as at Udine, a new castle was built on the ruins of the old. The damage to the castle and other important buildings in Škofja Loka were repaired quickly under Philipp von der Pfalz, the princebishop of Freising.

Religious reactions to the earthquake included the building of a shrine dedicated to the Virgin Mary in Venice, the Madonna del Terremoto. Also in Venice, the Patriarch blamed the earthquake on sodomy and this led to new legislation against this practice among Venetian institutions. The Patriarch organized a series of processions through the city.

In Udine, disused wells were reopened, in an apparent attempt to allow dispersal of the Earth's internal vapors, which were at the time blamed for triggering earthquakes.

== See also ==
- 1348 Friuli earthquake
- 1976 Friuli earthquake
- Idrija Fault
