= Arnoldstein =

Arnoldstein Podklošter
- Municipality
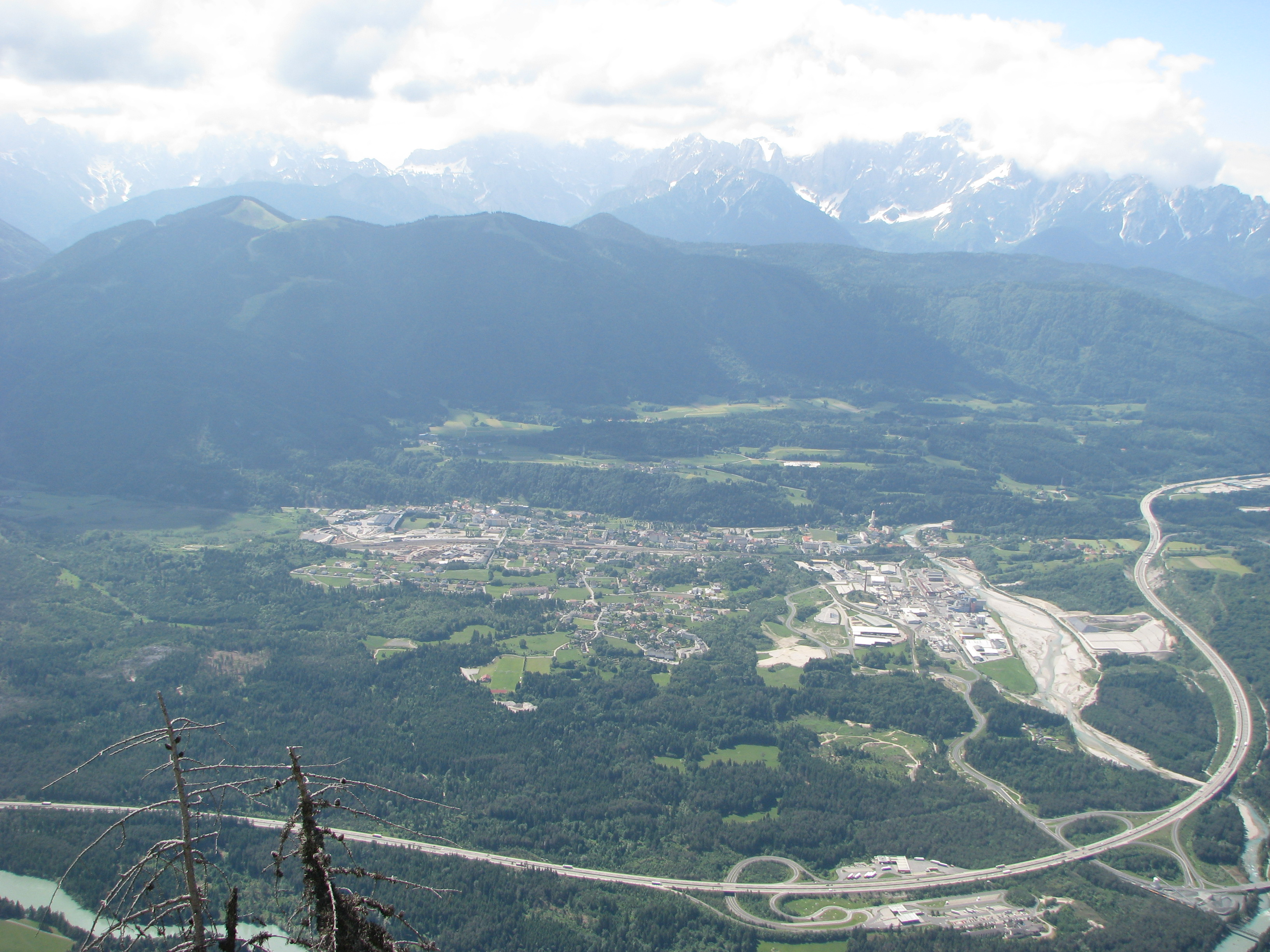
- Gail Valley with Arnoldstein and Süd Autobahn

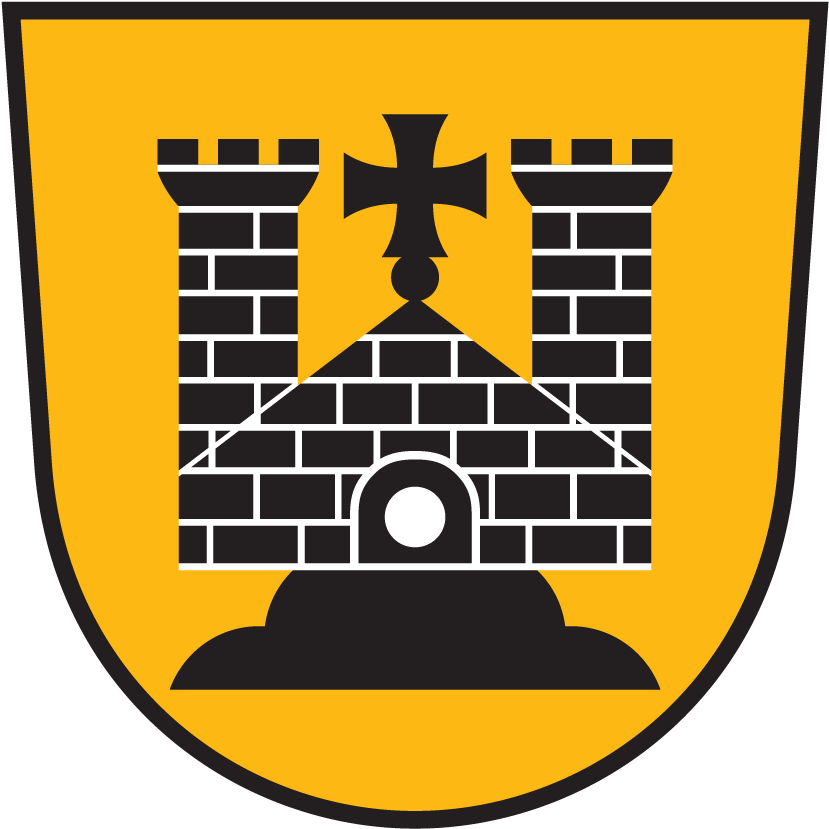
- Coat of arms

- Location within Austria
- Coordinates: 46°33′N 13°42′E
- Country: Austria
- State: Carinthia
- District: Villach-Land

Government
  - Mayor: Reinhard Antolitsch (SPÖ)

Area
  - Total: 67.4 km^{2} (26.0 sq mi)
- Elevation: 578 m (1,896 ft)

Population (2018-01-01)
  - Total: 7,096
  - Density: 105/km^{2} (273/sq mi)
- Time zone: UTC+1 (CET)
  - Summer (DST): UTC+2 (CEST)
- Postal code: 9601
- Area code: 04255
- Website: www.arnoldstein.co.at

Arnoldstein (Slovene: Podklošter, Italian: Oristagno) is a market town in the district of Villach-Land in the Austrian state of Carinthia.

== Geography ==
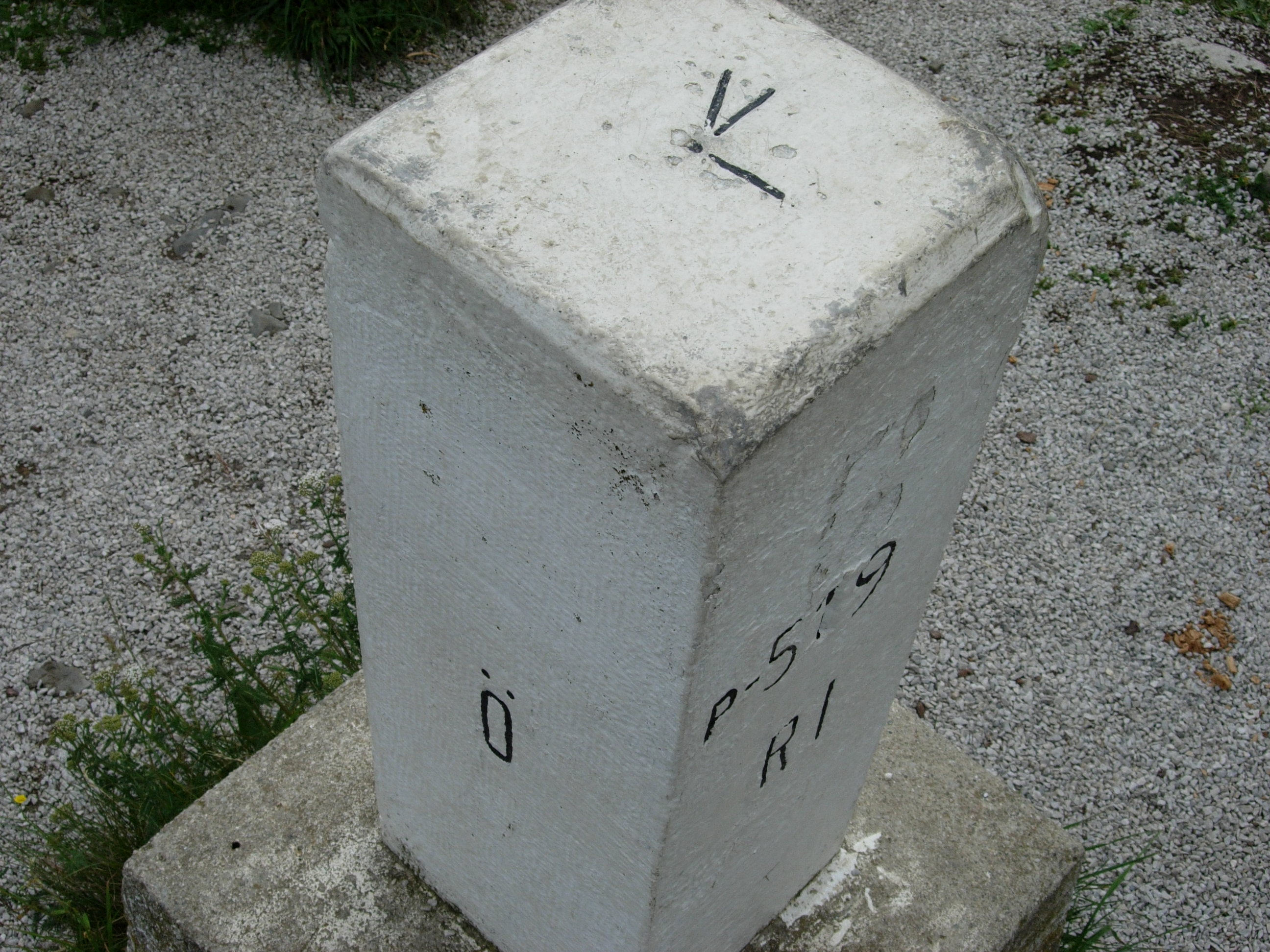
Tripoint Marker

=== Location ===
Arnoldstein is located at Austria's southern border between the Carnic Alps and the Karawanken mountain range, near the confluence of the Gailitz (Slovene: Ziljica, Italian: Slizza) and the Gail River (Slovene: Zilja, Italian: Zeglia). The tripoint with Tarvisio in Italy and Kranjska Gora in Slovenia is south of the town at the top of the Ofen (Slovene: Peč, Italian: Monte Forno) at 1,509m/4,951 ft. Today, there is a marker at this location.

Arnoldstein can be reached via the A2 Süd Autobahn from Vienna and the parallel Austrian Southern Railway (Rudolfsbahn), running from Klagenfurt to the Italian border, where it is continued by the Italian Pontebbana line to Udine.

=== Subdivision ===
Arnoldstein is divided into six Katastralgemeinden: Arnoldstein (Podklošter), Hart (Ločilo), Maglern (Megvarje), Pöckau (Peče), Riegersdorf (Rikarja vas), and Seltschach (Sovče).

It can be further divided into 21 localities (Ortschaften) (Population as of 2024):

German name	Slovene name	Italian name	Population
Agoritschach	Zagoriče		57
Arnoldstein	Podklošter	Oristagno	2,053
Erlendorf	Oljše		428
Gailitz	Ziljica		982
Greuth	Rute		15
Hart	Ločilo		309
Krainberg	Strmec		4
Krainegg	Podkrajnik		4
Lind	Lipa		112
Maglern	Megvarje		285
Neuhaus an der Gail	Poturje		318
Oberthörl	Zgornja Vrata		57
Pöckau	Peče		715
Pessendellach	Dole		59
Radendorf	Radna vas		198
Riegersdorf	Rikarja vas		516
St. Leonhard bei Siebenbrünn	Šentlenart pri Sedmih studencih		309
Seltschach	Sovče		383
Thörl-Maglern-Greuth	Rute pri Vratih	Porticina	9
Tschau	Čava		94
Unterthörl	Spodnja Vrata		236

== History ==
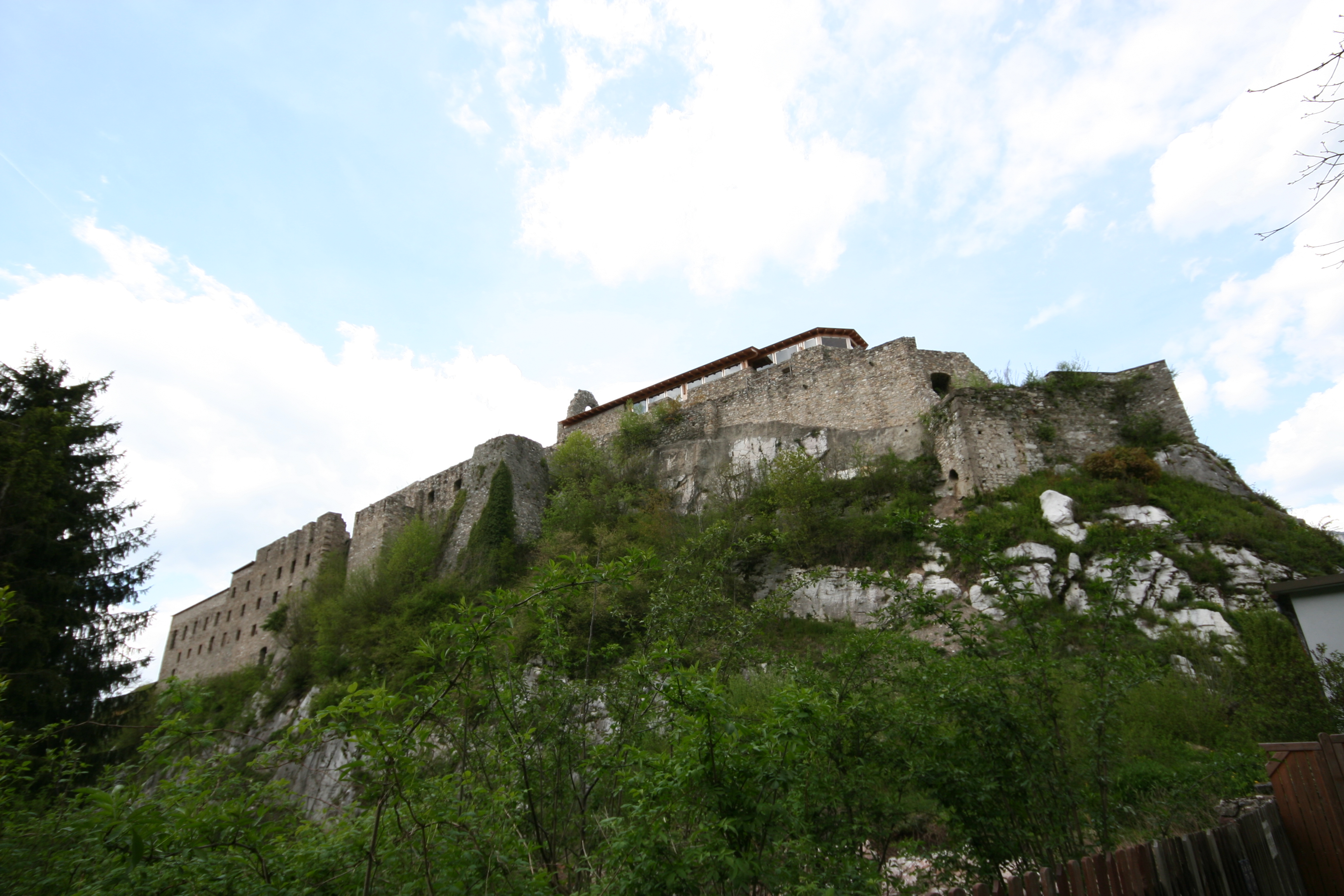
Ruins of Arnoldstein abbey

The area around Arnoldstein was already settled in ancient times, when a Roman Road along the Gailitz creek connected Aquileia with Virunum near present-day Klagenfurt, capital of the Noricum province.

Arnoldstein's name derives from the alleged founder of its castle, one knight Arnold, probably a ministerialis serving the Bishops of Bamberg. Upon his coronation in 1014, Emperor Henry II had granted large estates in the Duchy of Carinthia to the Bamberg diocese, that originally had been a possession of the Patriarchs of Aquileia. The castle itself was first mentioned about 1085, here Bishop Otto of Bamberg established a Benedictine abbey in 1106 to secure his Carinthian fiefs. Nevertheless, in 1176, the monks had to accept the secular Vogt overlordship of the Carinthian Sponheim dukes. In the mid-14th century their estates were devastated both by the 1348 Friuli earthquake and the Black Death pandemic.

To improve the economic situation, the abbot of Arnoldstein with the consent of the Bamberg bishop in 1495 allowed the Augsburg merchants Ulrich, Georg and Jakob Fugger to exploit the surrounding ore deposits and to build up smelting works, mainly for copper and silver. At their Fuggerau enterprise, the Fugger family was largely engaged in the trade on the route to Venice, until the premises were repurchased by the Arnoldstein monastery in 1570. The debt, together with the effects of the Protestant Reformation, nearly ruined the abbey's finances. Today a shot tower built in 1814 marks the site of the former foundry.

Arnoldstein again flourished in the course of the Counter-Reformation. Despite all attempts by the Austrian House of Habsburg to seize the estates, the monastery was not abolished until 1783 by decree of Emperor Joseph II. The building burnt down in 1883 and only ruins remained. Since 1980, the premises have been gradually restored.

== Politics ==
The municipal council (Gemeinderat) consists of 27 members. Since the 2021 local elections, it is made up of the following parties:

- Social Democratic Party of Austria (SPÖ): 18 seats
- Austrian People's Party (ÖVP): 6 seats
- Freedom Party of Austria (FPÖ): 3 seats

The mayor, Reinhard Antolitsch (SPÖ), was elected in 2021.
