= Zadnja Vas =

Zadnja Vas Sveta Lucija (until 1955)
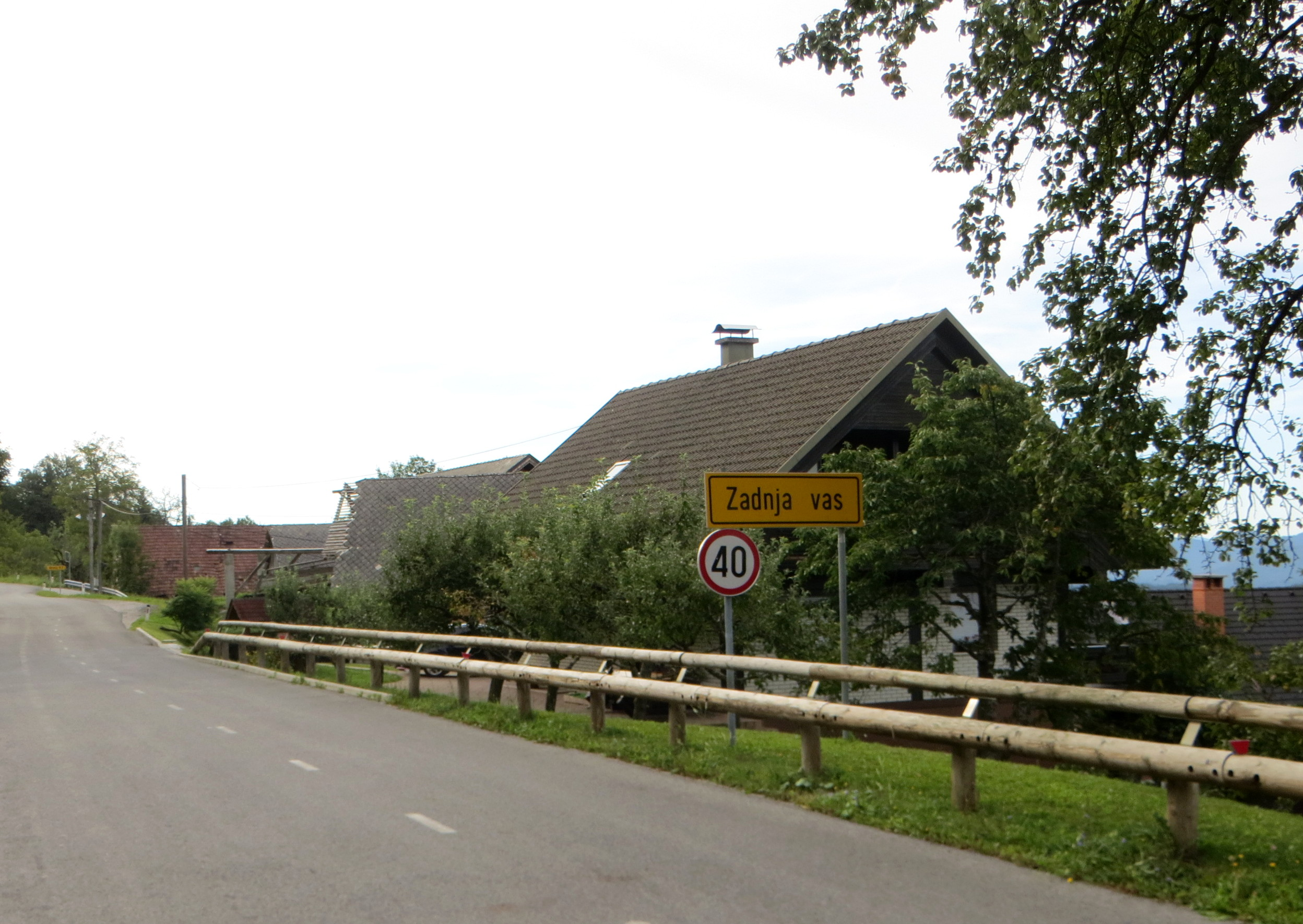

- Location in Slovenia
- Coordinates: 46°21′45.04″N 14°14′24.29″E
- Country: Slovenia
- Region: Upper Carniola
- Statistical region: Upper Carniola
- Municipality: Radovljica
- Elevation: 623.8 m (2,047 ft)

Population (2023)
  - Total: 30

Zadnja Vas (pronounced [ˈzaːdnja ˈʋaːs]; Slovene: Zadnja vas) is a small village in the Municipality of Radovljica in the Upper Carniola region of Slovenia.

== Name ==
Zadnja Vas was attested in historical sources as Oberdorf in 1436. The later Slovene name of the settlement was changed from Sveta Lucija (literally, 'Saint Lucy') to Zadnja vas (literally, 'upper/last village') in 1955. The name was changed on the basis of the 1948 Law on Names of Settlements and Designations of Squares, Streets, and Buildings as part of efforts by Slovenia's postwar communist government to remove religious elements from toponyms. Both the medieval German name Oberdorf (literally 'upper village') and the 1955 name are based on analogy with the name of nearby Srednja Vas (literally, 'middle village').

== Church ==
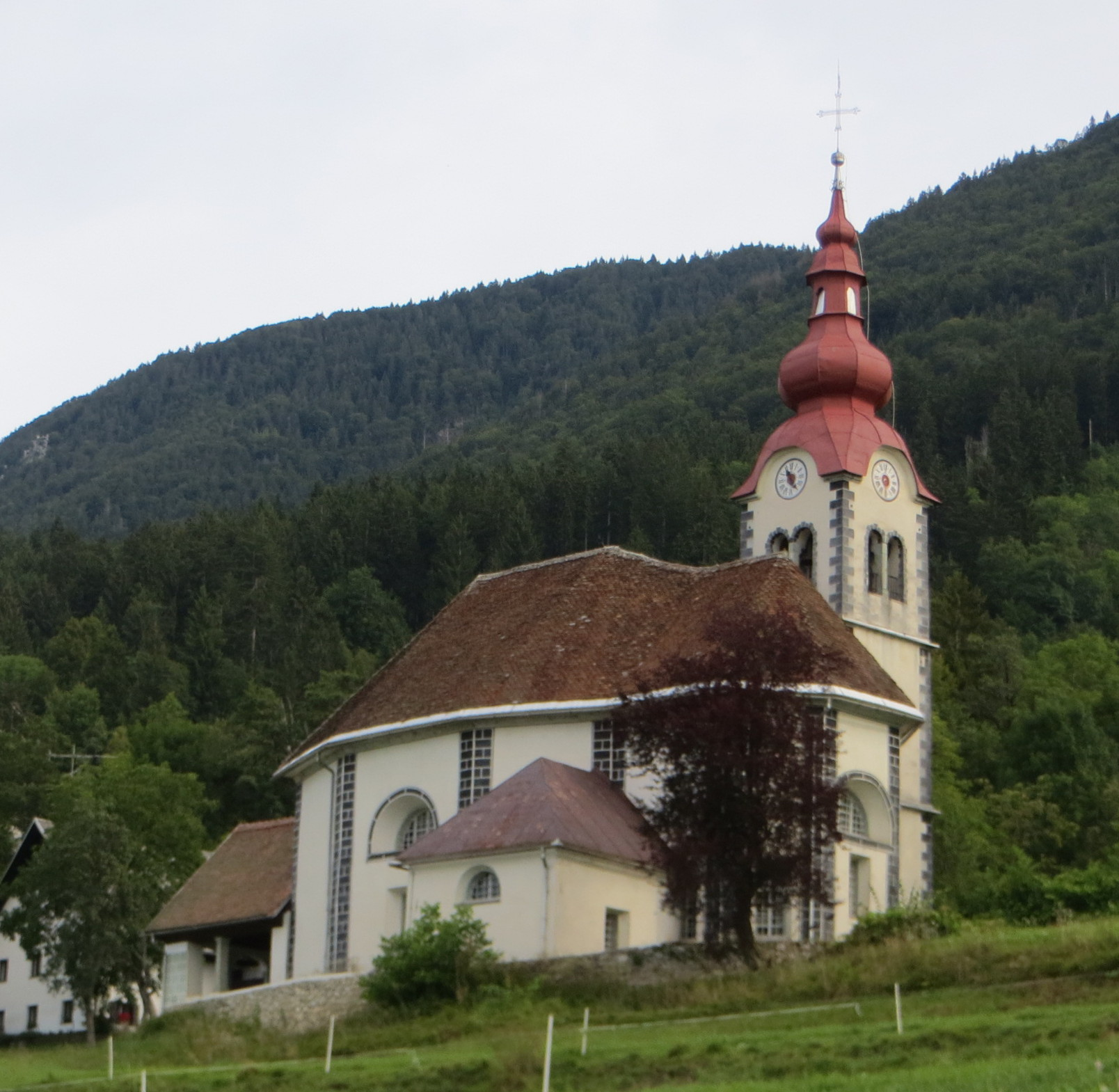
Saint Lucy's Church

The village church is dedicated to Saint Lucy and was first mentioned in documents dating to 1464, but was extensively rebuilt in the 17th century, when a decorative architrave made of local volcanic green tuff was also added. The church was formerly dedicated to Saint Judoc.

== Gallery ==
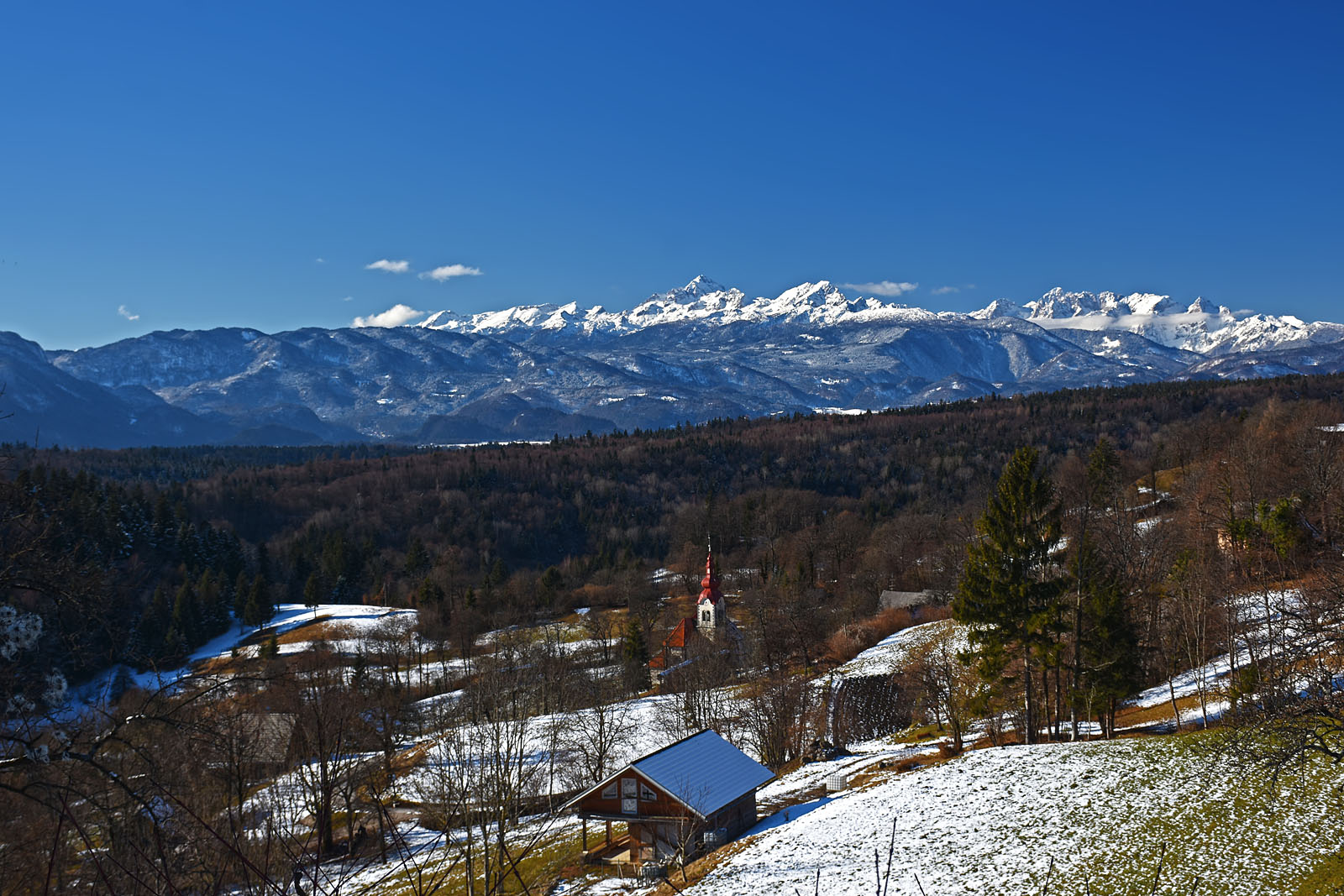
Zadnja Vas
