= Udine Castle =

Castle in Udine, Italy

Coordinates: 46°03′51″N 13°14′11″E

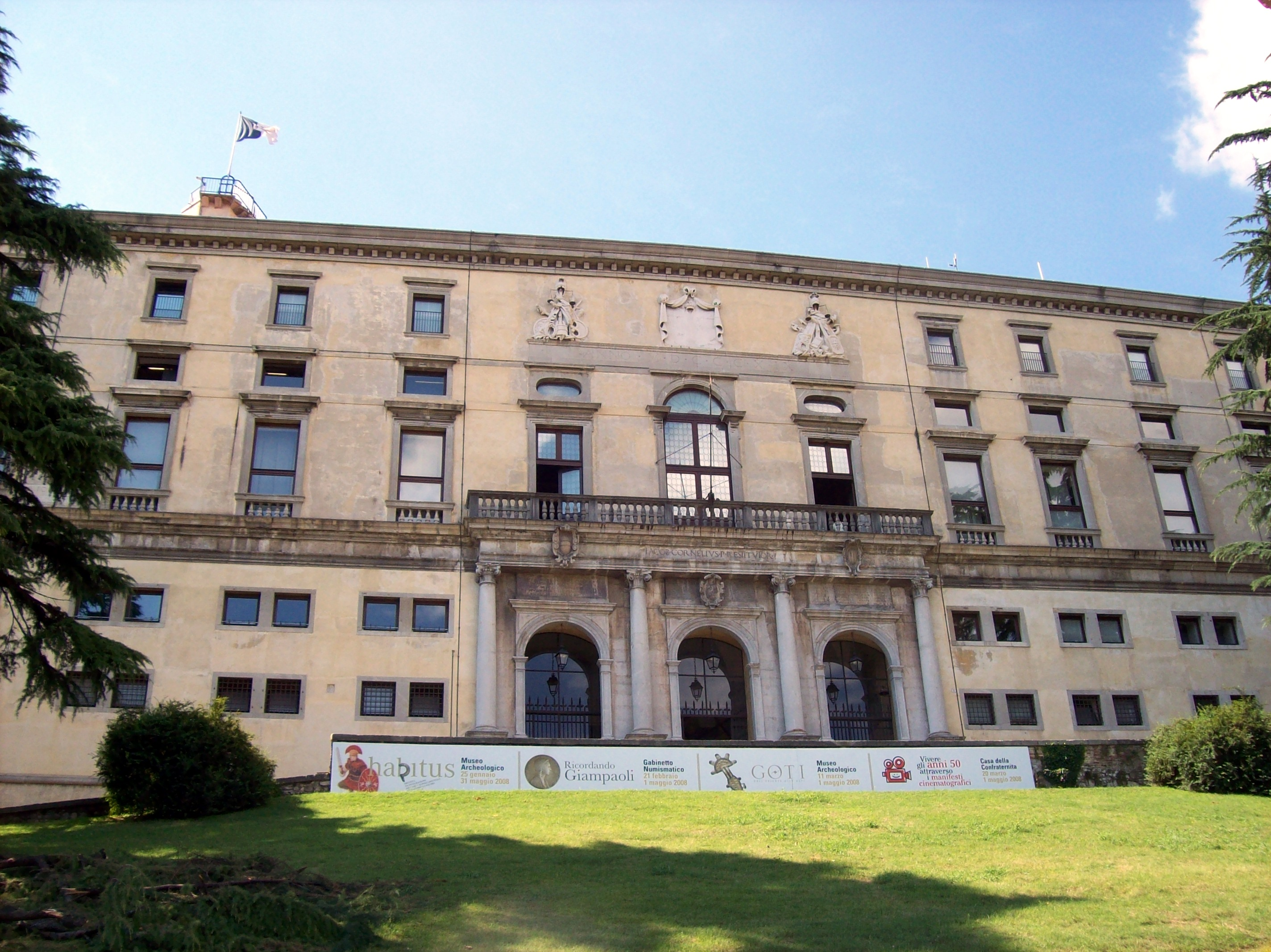
The front side of the Castle

The Udine Castle (Italian: Castello di Udine) is a historical building in Udine, Northern Italy, built on a hill in the historical center of the city (138 meters above sea level).

== History ==
=== Bronze Age ===
Digital Terrain Model of the Bronze Age Udine Hill and surrounding settlement area

Recent scientific studies have shown that the hill is artificial, with origins dating back to the Bronze Age. It might date to a period between 3000 and 3500 years ago (which includes the Urnfield period) — comparable in age to the slightly higher Silbury Hill in Wiltshire, England, dating from c. 2300 BC. However the castle Hill in Udine is bigger by volume, making it the biggest prehistoric mound in Europe.

=== Middle Ages ===
The first official statement of the existence of a building on the hill dates back to 983: the Holy Roman Emperor Otto II donated to Rodoaldo, Patriarch of Aquileia a castrum or military building.

=== Modern period ===
The present building has the form of a palace and it was built on the ruins of a fortress destroyed in the year 1511 Idrija earthquake. The construction had started in 1517 and the works had lasted for 50 years. The external decoration of the palace and the paintings in the Parliament Hall are due to Giovanni da Udine, one of the pupils of Raphael.

The council of the Patria del Friuli was one of the first parliaments in the world, and it was suppressed after the French occupation in 1797.

Today the castle hosts the History and Art Museum of the City of Udine.

== Gallery ==
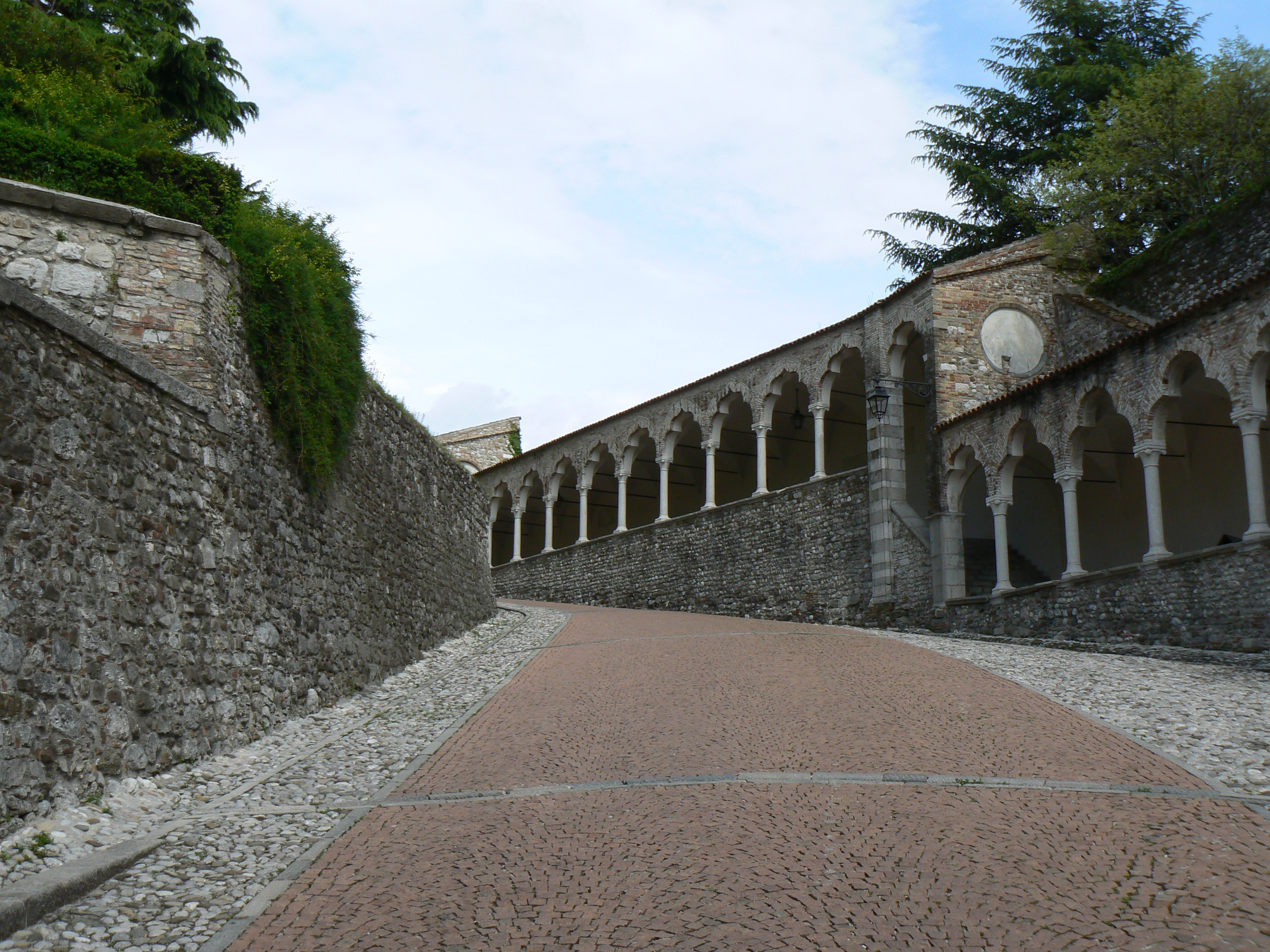
The slope to the Castle

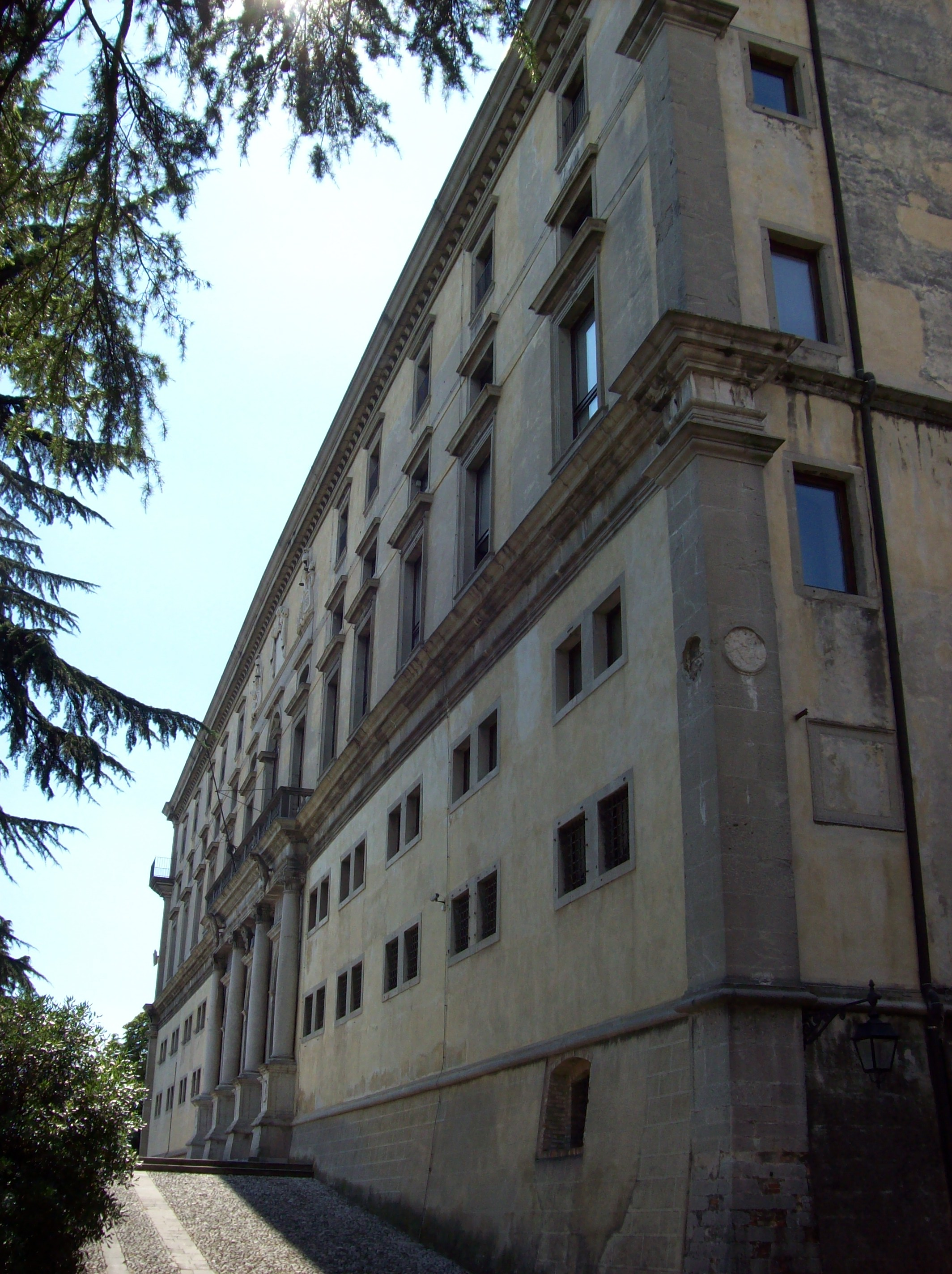
Front entrance of the Castle

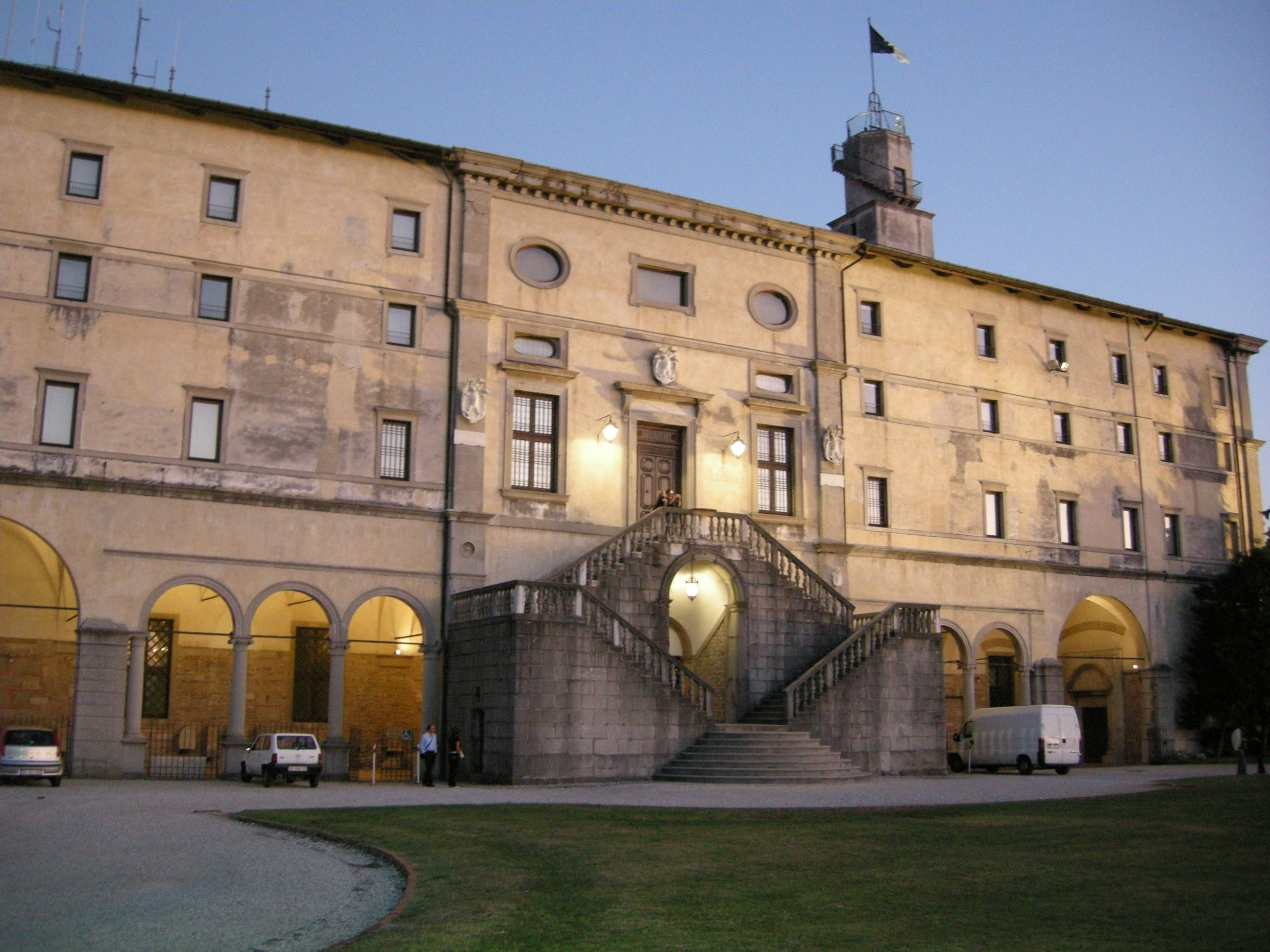
Rear view of the Castle

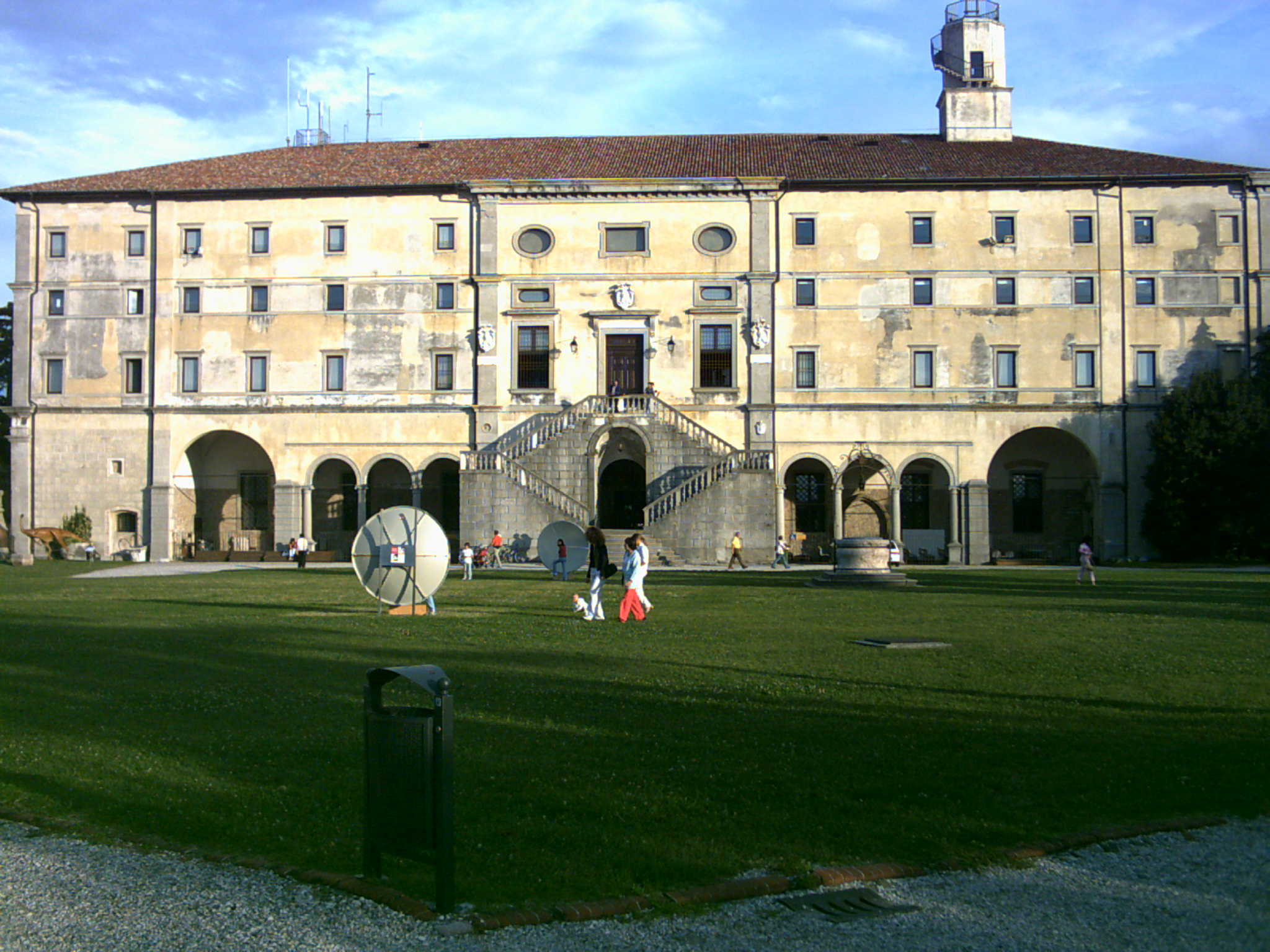
Rear view with the square

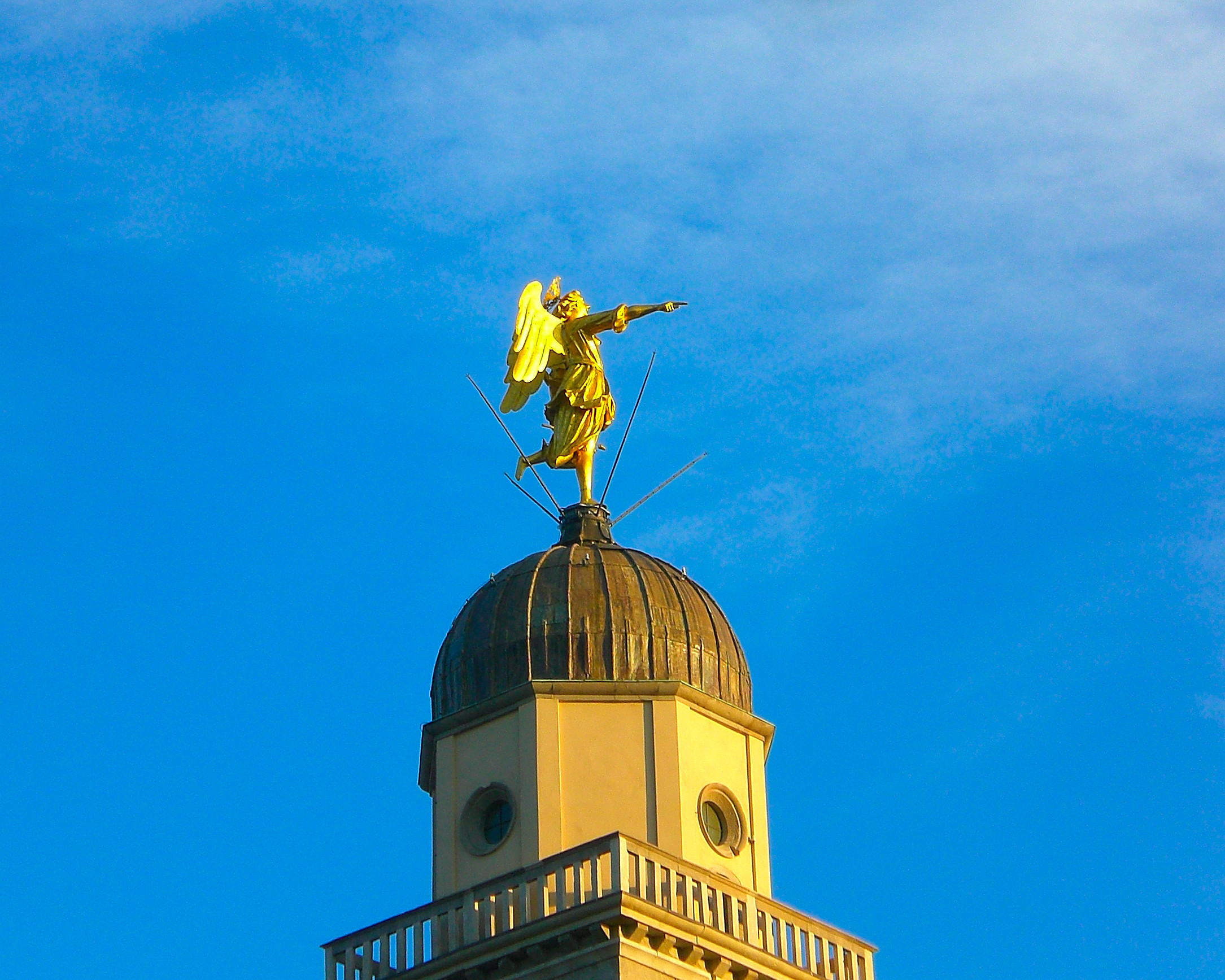
The Angel of the steeple of the Church of Santa Maria di Castello di Udine
