= Slatna =

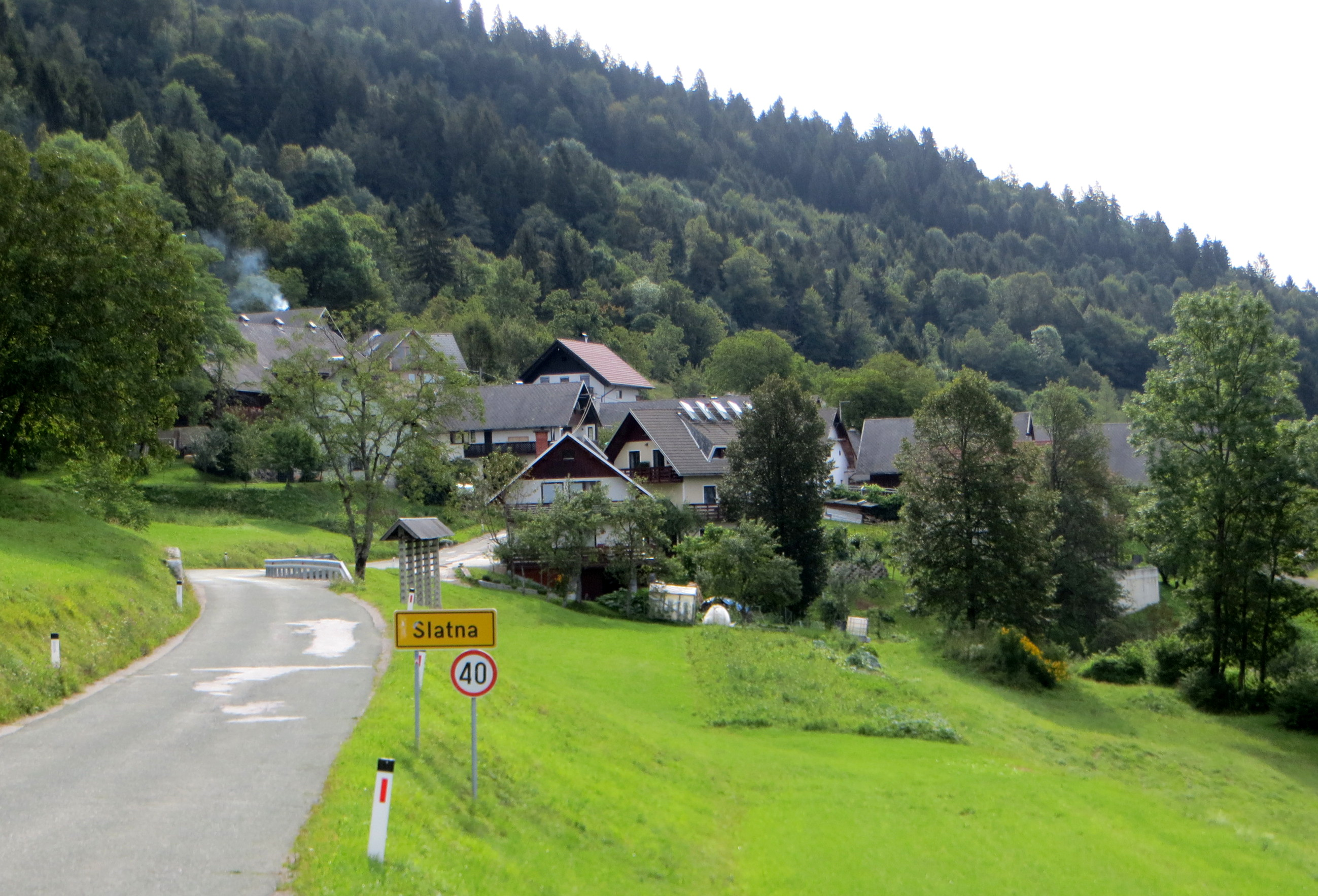

- Location in Slovenia
- Coordinates: 46°22′6.1″N 14°13′37.41″E
- Country: Slovenia
- Region: Upper Carniola
- Statistical region: Upper Carniola
- Municipality: Radovljica
- Elevation: 638.1 m (2,094 ft)

Population (2002)
  - Total: 53

Slatna (pronounced [ˈslaːtna] or [slaˈtna]) is a small village above Begunje in the Municipality of Radovljica in the Upper Carniola region of Slovenia.

== Name ==
Slatna was attested in historical sources as Slatein in 1326 and as Slatin in 1422. The name is a syncopated form of the common noun slatina 'mineral water (spring)', referring to a location where such a spring is found.

== Glanz Castle (New Gutenberg) ==
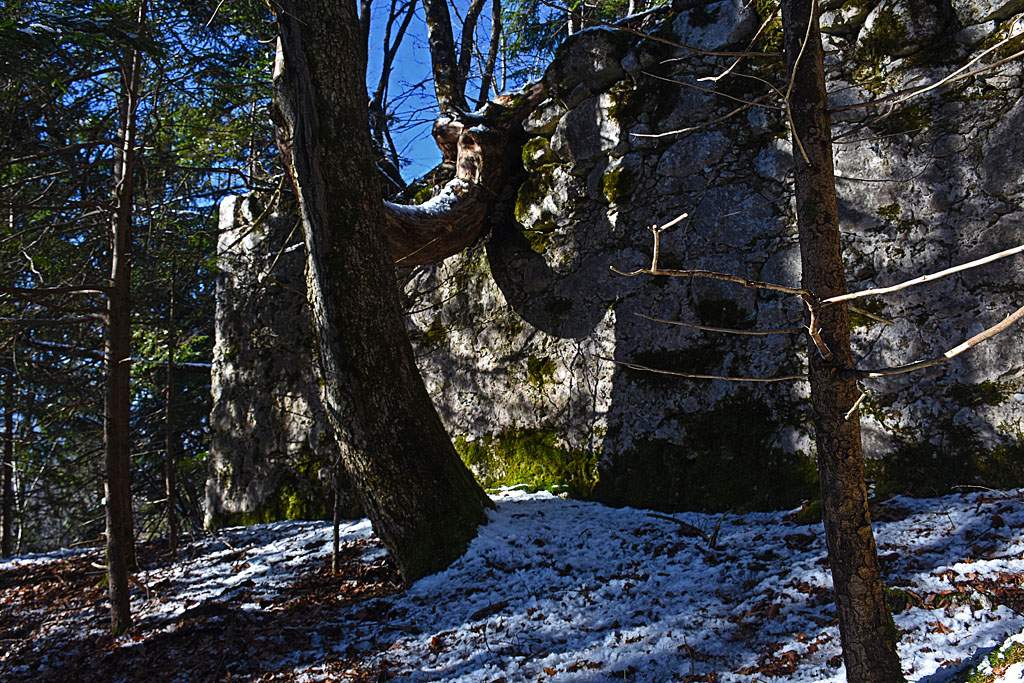
Glanz Castle

In the Middle Ages, Glanz Manor stood northwest of today's village. It was never a typical medieval defensive structure, but only a set of wealthy dwellings that were part of the estate of Kamen Castle. At the end of the 15th century, the Lamberg noble family renovated the structure and added more buildings with some defensive walls. For them the manor had a special value, and so in 1557 they applied the name Gutenberg to it; this was the name of their previous large castle above Bistrica near Tržič. However, New Gutenberg also fell into disrepair by the beginning of the 17th century.
