= 1348 Eastern Alps earthquake =

Earthquake in northeastern Italy

1348 Friuli earthquake
- Location within Alps
- Local date: 25 January 1348
- Magnitude: 6.63 ± 0.10 M_{w}
- Epicenter: 46.504°N 13.581°E
- Type: Thrust
- Areas affected: Italy (Friuli-Venezia Giulia); Austria (Carinthia)
- Max. intensity: MMI X (Extreme)
- Casualties: 10,000

The 1348 Friuli earthquake, centered in the South Alpine region of Friuli, was felt across Europe on 25 January. The earthquake hit in the same year that the Great Plague ravaged Italy. According to contemporary sources, it caused considerable damage to structures; churches and houses collapsed and villages were destroyed.

== Tectonic setting ==
The Friuli region is located in an area of complex geological structure where the WSW-ENE trending thrust belt of the Southern Alps overlaps with the NW-SE trending thrust belt of the Dinaric Alps as a result of the continuing convergence between the Adriatic and Eurasian plates. It has been suggested that the 1348 event was a result of movement on part of the Periadriatic thrust.

== Impact ==
The epicenter was located east of Tolmezzo, Venzone and Gemona, with a seismic intensity of eight to nine according to the European Macroseismic Scale (approximately measured 6.9 on the Richter scale). Most of the damage reported was in Northern Italy, in the present-day Friuli-Venezia Giulia region, in the adjacent provinces of Belluno, Vicenza and Verona up to Lombardy and Venice, as well as in Carinthia and Carniola (in today's Slovenia) to the north and east. Aftershocks occurred until 5 March.

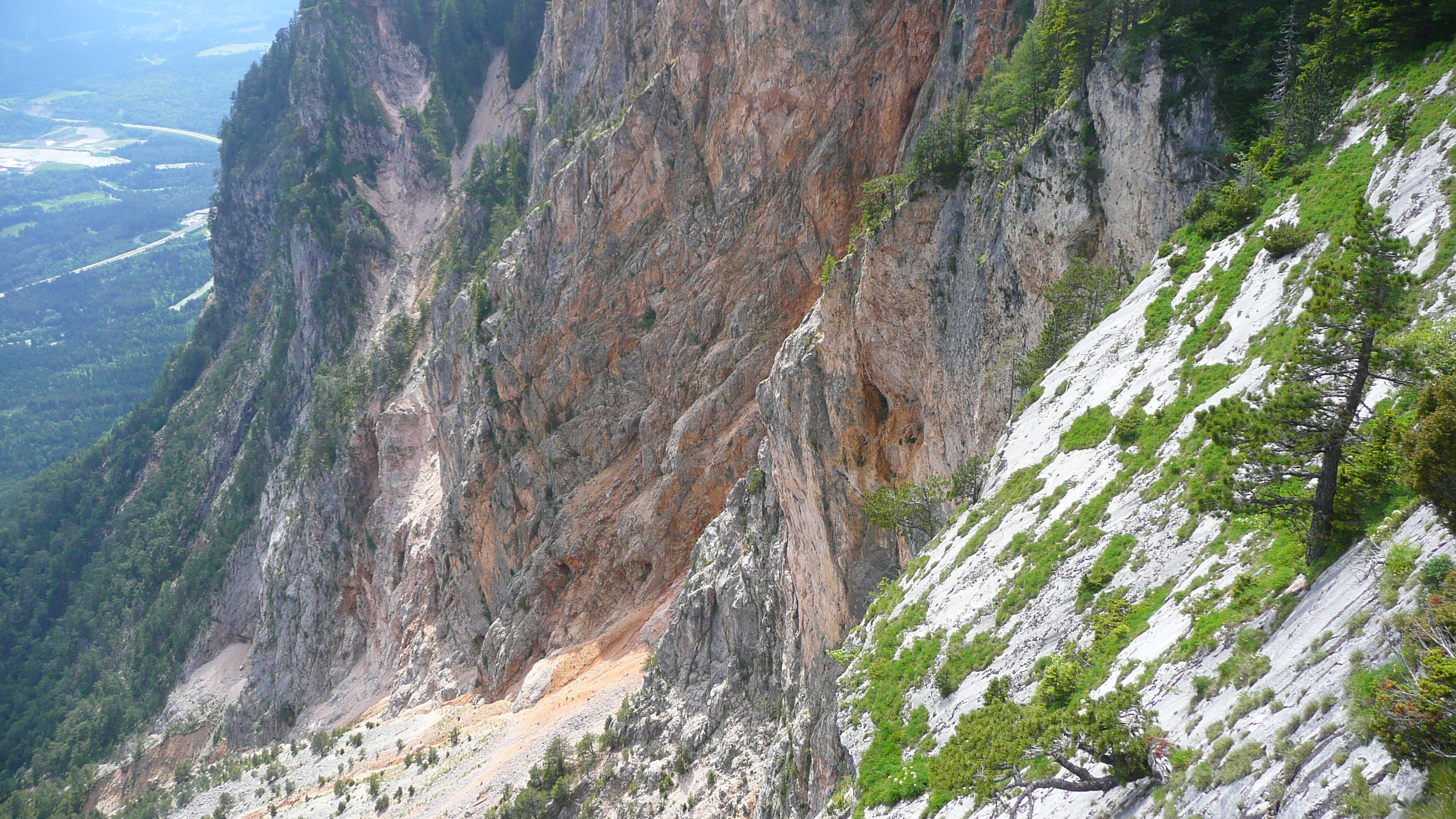
Rockslide area above Villach

Striking in the early afternoon, the earthquake caused hundreds of casualties and destroyed numerous buildings. In Udine, the castle and the cathedral were severely damaged. In Carinthia, the town of Villach and numerous surrounding villages were largely destroyed by a major landslide followed by a flood of the Gail River. Even in Rome the earthquake allegedly took a toll: considerable damage was sustained by the Basilica of Santa Maria Maggiore; in the Torre delle Milizie, an upper floor crumbled, and the structure assumed the slight tilt it retains today. The sixth-century basilica of Santi Apostoli was so utterly ruined that it was left in an abandoned state for a generation.

The earthquake coincided with the beginning of the Black Death in Europe; in contemporary minds the two disasters were connected, as acts of God, but accepted as something both tremendous and unexpected, and yet which also belonged to daily life. The historian of medicine A. G. Carmichael observes, "The earthquake of 25 January 1348 is likely to have fuelled and focused specifically apocalyptical fears more than plague did." The only explicit reference to the earthquake as an omen of the end of the world comes in the chronicle of Giovanni Villani. Guglielmo Cortusi of Padua, as well as the bankers of Udine, saw it as a memento mori and a sign to repent, but not of imminent apocalypse. The earthquake figured in the diary of the German nun Christina Ebner, and was reported in numerous city and abbey chronicles, which have given modern historians opportunities of making the "Friuli event" one of the most thoroughly studied medieval earthquakes.

== See also ==
- List of earthquakes in Italy
- List of historical earthquakes
- 1511 Idrija earthquake
