= Gorenja Sava =

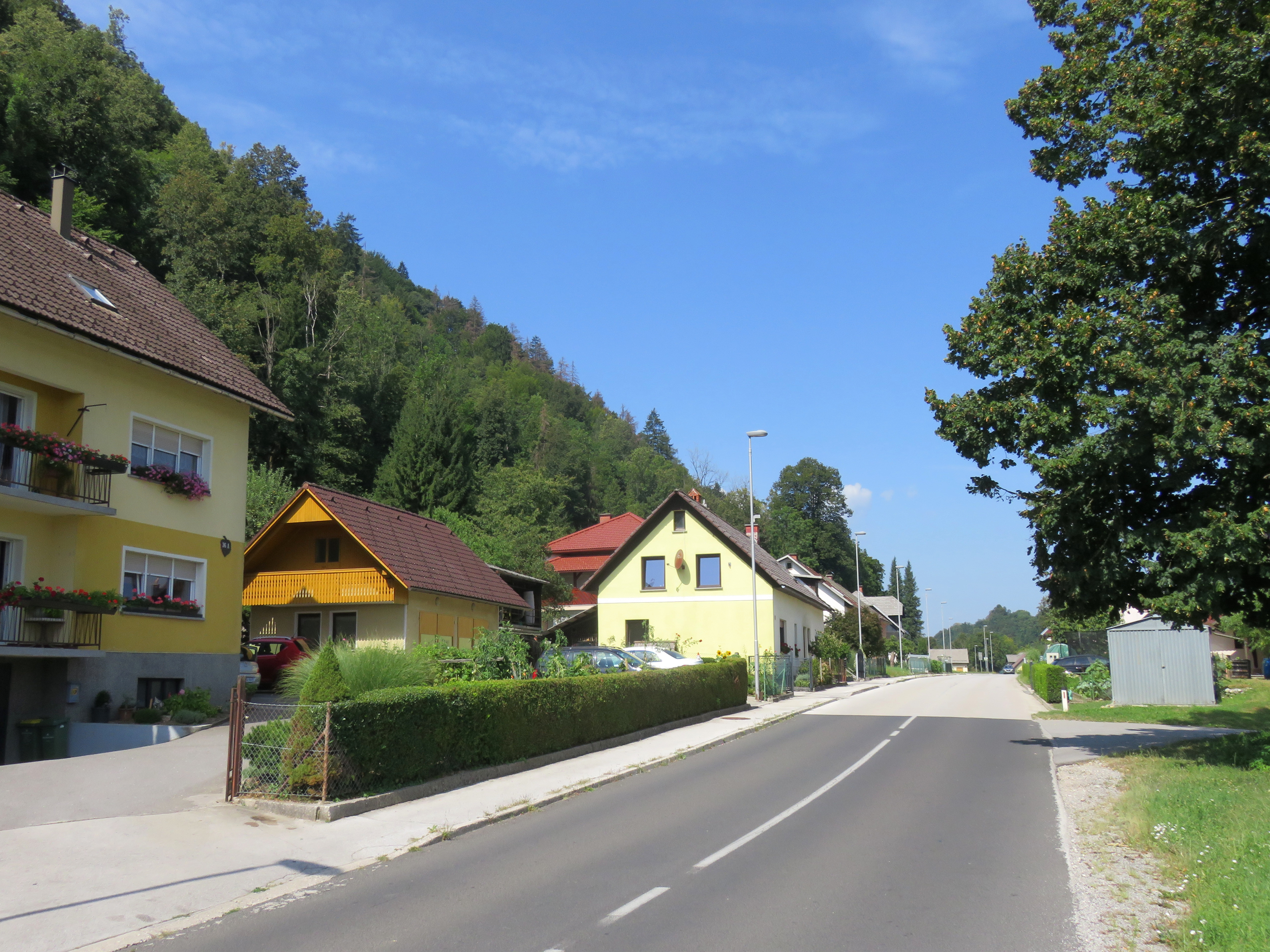

- Location in Slovenia
- Coordinates: 46°14′48″N 14°20′25″E
- Country: Slovenia
- Traditional region: Upper Carniola
- Statistical region: Upper Carniola
- Municipality: Kranj
- Elevation: 357 m (1,171 ft)

Gorenja Sava (pronounced [ɡɔˈɾeːnja ˈsaːʋa]; German: Gorenjasawa) is a former settlement in the Municipality of Kranj in the Upper Carniola region of Slovenia. It is now part of the city of Kranj.

== Geography ==
Gorenja Sava stands northwest of Kranj's city center, on a terrace between the foot of Mount Saint Margaret (Slovene: Šmarjetna gora) and the right bank of the Sava River. It is connected by road to Spodnja Besnica to the north and to the former village of Kalvarija to the south.

== Name ==
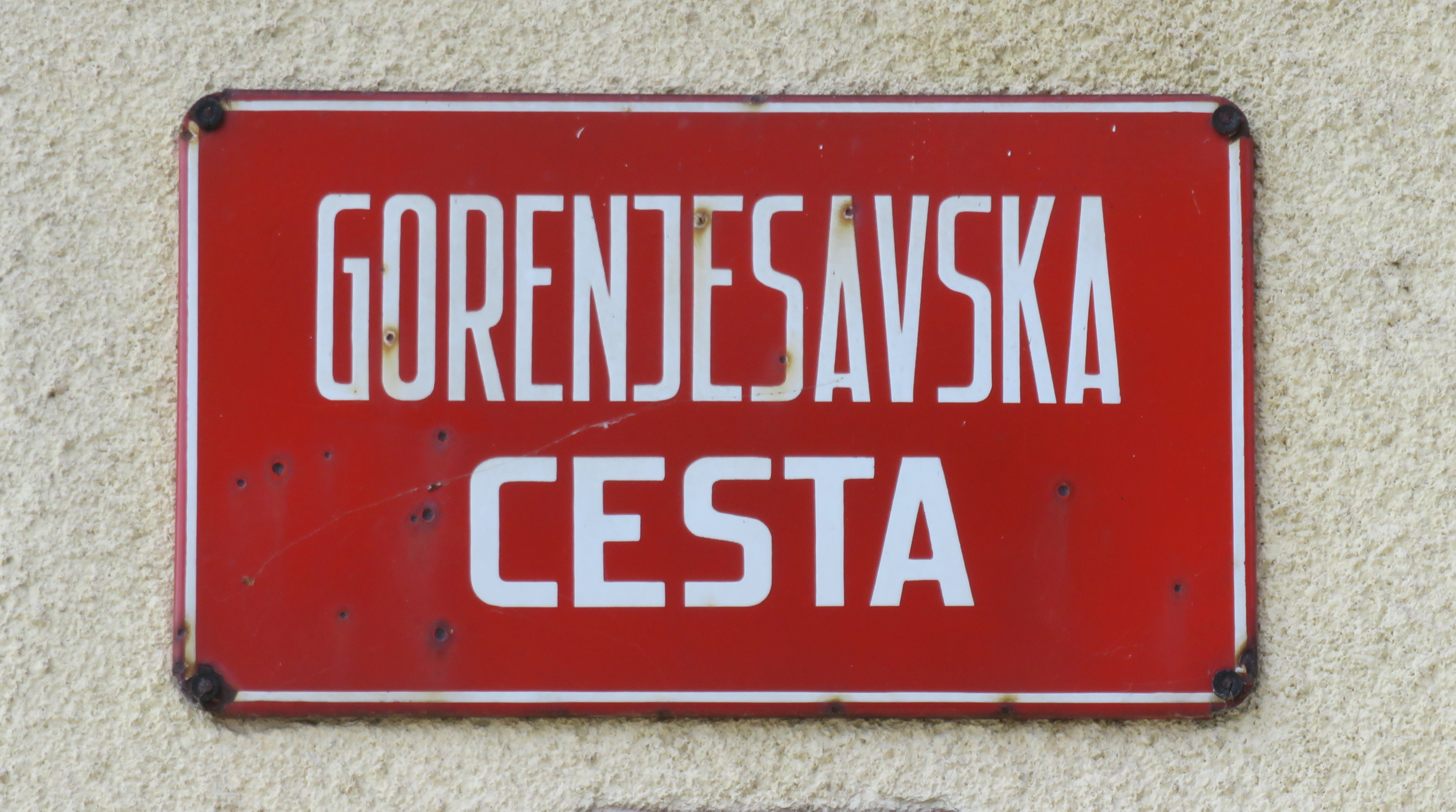
A sign for Gorenjesavska cesta 'Gorenja Sava Street'

Gorenja Sava was attested in historical sources as Sawa in 1291, Zaw in 1347, and Obersaw in 1481, among other variations. The name Gorenja Sava means 'upper Sava' and refers to its upstream location on the Sava River.

== History ==
Gorenja Sava had a population of 211 in 33 houses in 1870, 214 in 37 houses in 1880, 238 in 35 houses in 1900, and 220 in 35 houses in 1931. Gorenja Sava was annexed by the city of Kranj in 1957, ending its existence as a separate settlement.
