= Zgornja Besnica, Kranj =

Zgornja Besnica
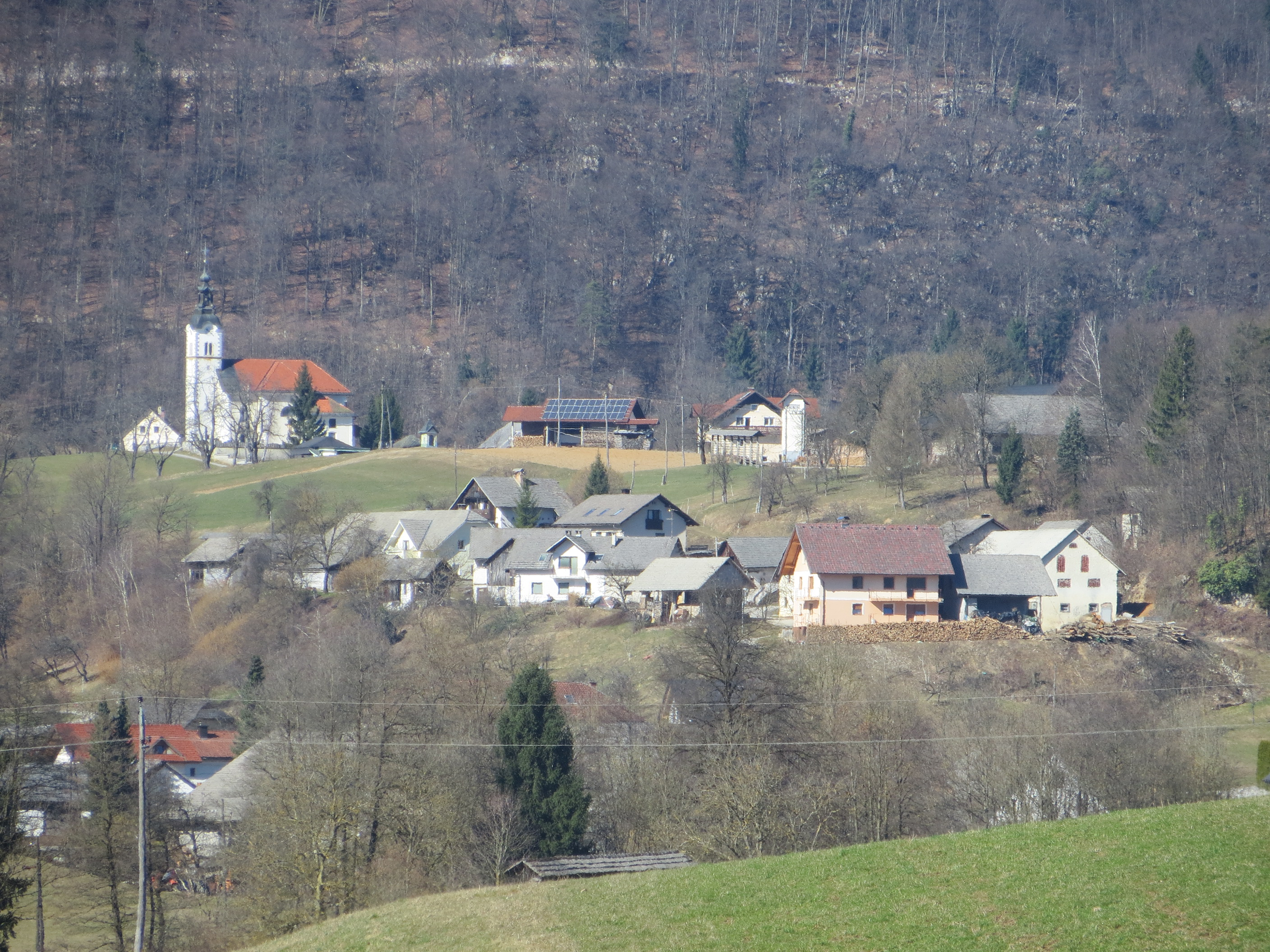

- Location in Slovenia
- Coordinates: 46°15′33.13″N 14°15′53.67″E
- Country: Slovenia
- Traditional region: Upper Carniola
- Statistical region: Upper Carniola
- Municipality: Kranj

Area
  - Total: 16.86 km^{2} (6.51 sq mi)
- Elevation: 508.8 m (1,669 ft)

Population (2002)
  - Total: 651

Zgornja Besnica (pronounced [ˈzɡoːɾnja ˈbeːsnitsa]; German: Oberweßnitz) is a village in the Municipality of Kranj in the Upper Carniola region of Slovenia.

== Geography ==
Zgornja Besnica is a scattered village on partially wooded terraced terrain below the eastern slope of Rovnik Hill (707 meters or 2,320 feet). It includes the hamlets of Brše, Čepulje, Dvor, Klinar, Nova Vas, Podrovnik, and Videm. It is connected by road to Kranj to the southeast and Nemilje to the west. The Lucenk Woods stands south of the village, and there is a trail to the north to Šum Falls on Nemiljščica Creek, located just beyond the village's territory in Poljšica pri Podnartu. Bidovec Cave (Bidovčeva luknja), with a length of 130 meters (430 ft), lies to the west, below the summit of Rovnik Hill. Other caves in the area include Brjevšca Cave, Grlovec Cave, and Podskokar Cave (Podskokarjeva jama).

== Name ==
The name Zgornja Besnica means 'upper Besnica', contrasting with Spodnja Besnica 'lower Besnica', which lies 79 meters (259 ft) lower in elevation. The two villages were attested in historical documents as Vessnitz in 1421, referring to the stream of the same name. The name Besnica is originally a hydronym that was later applied to the settlement along Besnica Creek, a tributary of the Sava. The name is derived from the Slavic adjective *běsьnъ 'rushing, swift', referring the character of the stream.

== Church ==
The parish church in the settlement is dedicated to Saint Giles.
