= Kalvarija, Kranj =

Kalvarija
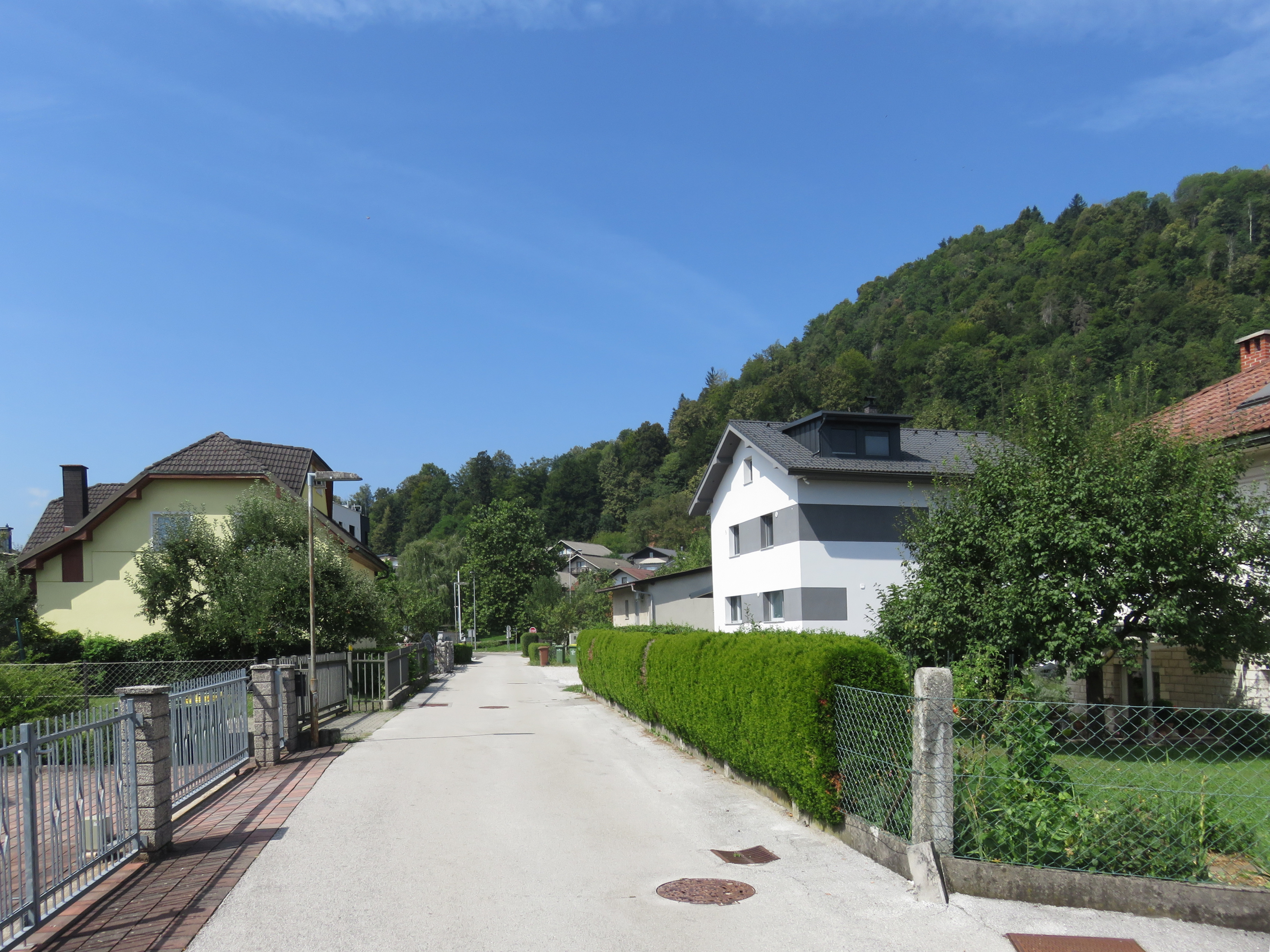

- Location in Slovenia
- Coordinates: 46°14′17″N 14°20′48″E
- Country: Slovenia
- Traditional region: Upper Carniola
- Statistical region: Upper Carniola
- Municipality: Kranj
- Elevation: 395 m (1,296 ft)

Kalvarija (pronounced [kalˈʋaːɾija]) is a former settlement in the Municipality of Kranj in the Upper Carniola region of Slovenia. It is now part of the city of Kranj.

== Geography ==
Kalvarija stands west of Kranj's city center, below the slope of Mount Saint Margaret (Slovene: Šmarjetna gora) and above the right bank of the Sava River. It is connected by road to the former village of Gorenja Sava to the north and to the former village of Stražišče to the south.

== Name ==
The name Kalvarija means 'Calvary'. Until the end of the Second World War, the Gaštej Calvary Shrine (Slovene: Kalvarija na Gašteju) stood in the village above the Sava River. The shrine was demolished, but after the collapse of communism and Slovenia's independence, a Calvary shrine was created at the same site in the 1990s by the sculptor Stane Jarm (1931–2011). The shrine stands next to the house at Kocjan Street (Slovene: Kocjanova ulica) no. 30.

== History ==
Kalvarija was annexed by the city of Kranj in 1957, ending its existence as a separate settlement.
