= Poljšica pri Podnartu =

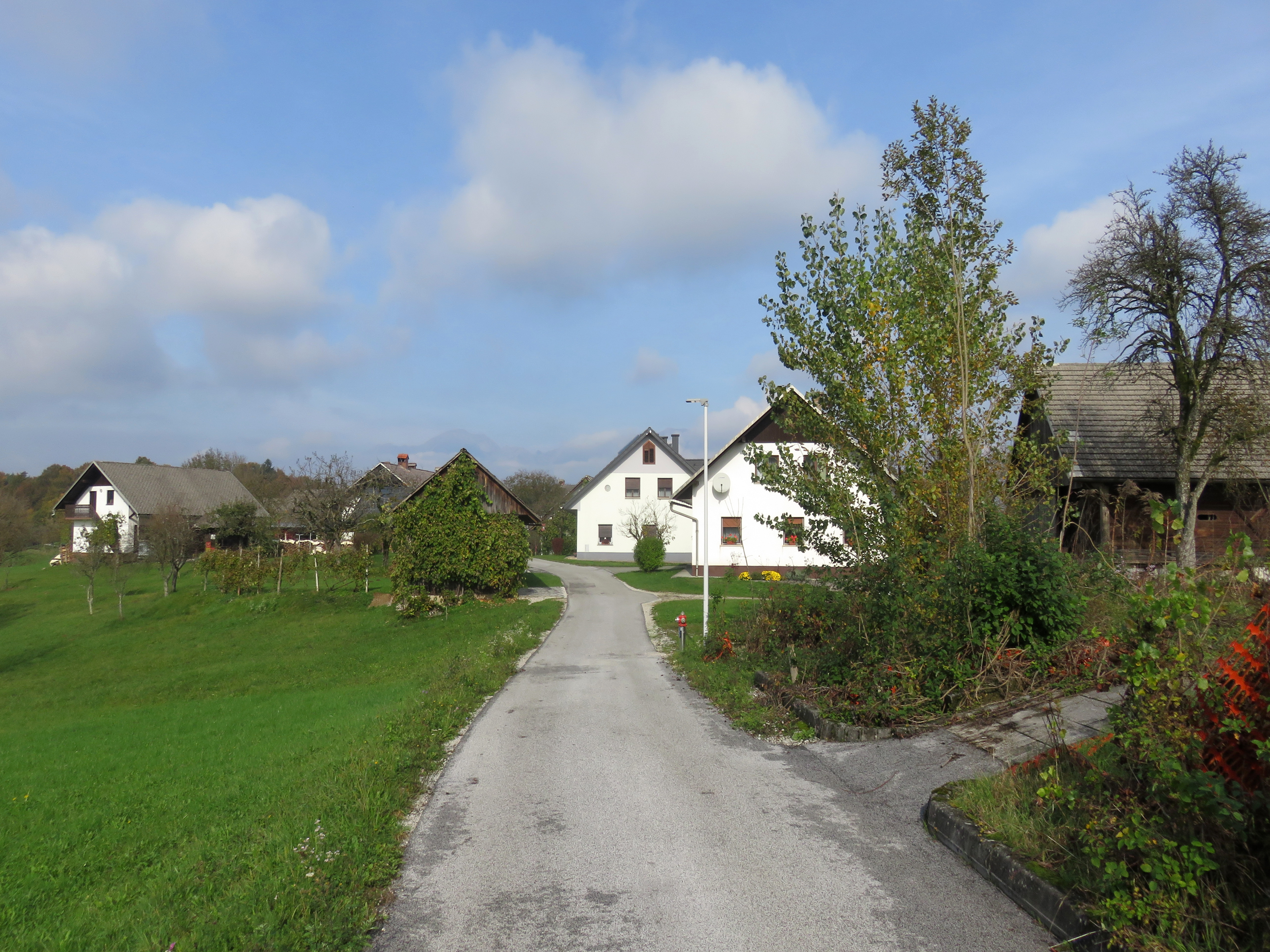

- Location in Slovenia
- Coordinates: 46°16′45.54″N 14°15′30.29″E
- Country: Slovenia
- Region: Upper Carniola
- Statistical region: Upper Carniola
- Municipality: Radovljica
- Elevation: 479.1 m (1,572 ft)

Population (2002)
  - Total: 101

Poljšica pri Podnartu (pronounced [pɔlˈʃiːtsa pɾi pɔˈdnaːɾtu]) is a settlement in the Municipality of Radovljica in the Upper Carniola region of Slovenia.

== Geography ==
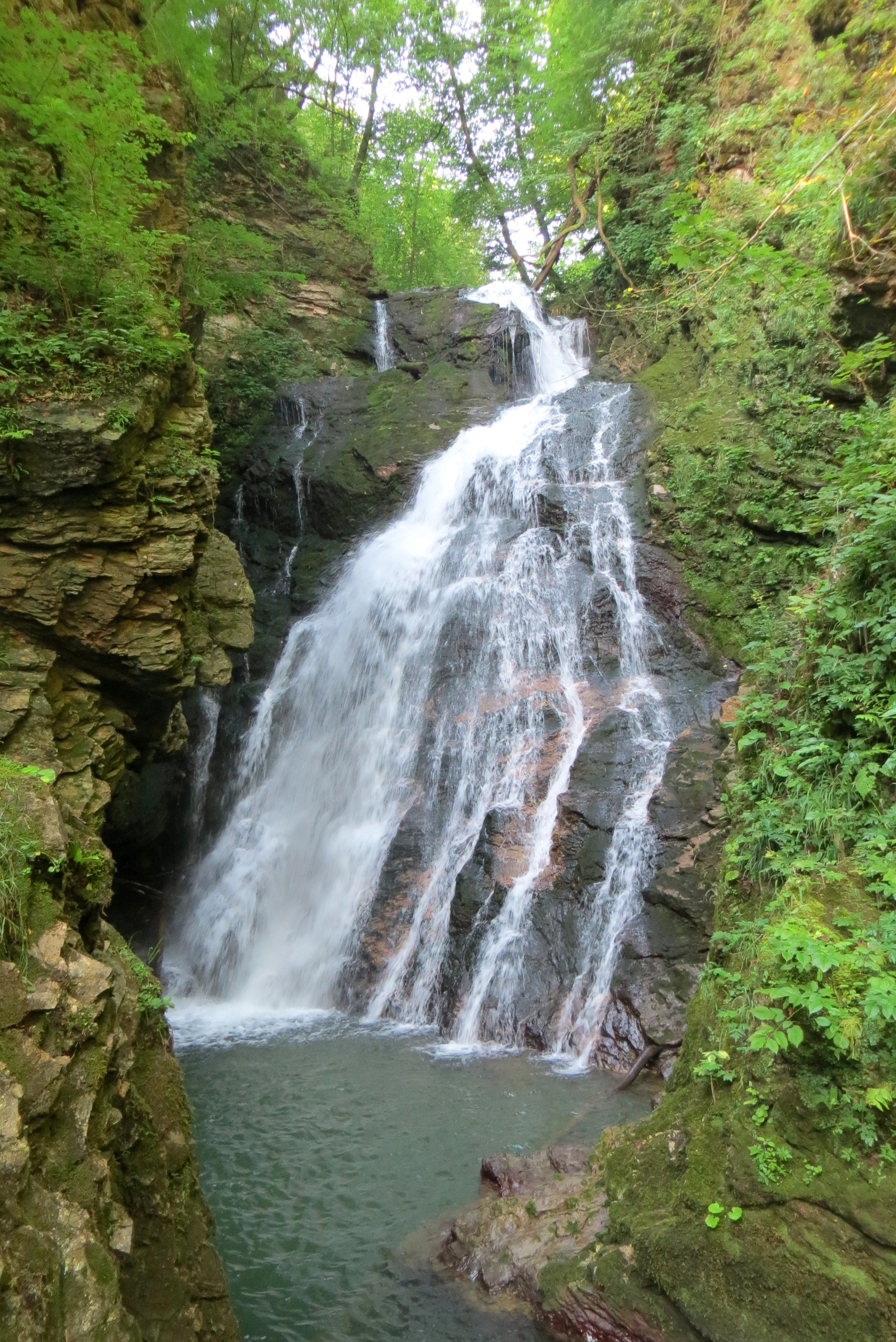
Šum Falls

Poljšica pri Podnartu stands on a plateau above a wooded slope descending to Plaznica Creek to the south and the Sava River to the east. It consists of two hamlets: Naj Kajžah to the west and Na Kmetih to the east. Šum Falls on Nemiljščica Creek is located in the extreme southwest of the village's territory, near its border with Zgornja Besnica, where there is a trail to the falls. The falls have a height of 25 meters (82 ft).

== Name ==
The name of the settlement was changed from Poljšica to Poljšica pri Podnartu in 1953.
