= Spodnja Besnica =

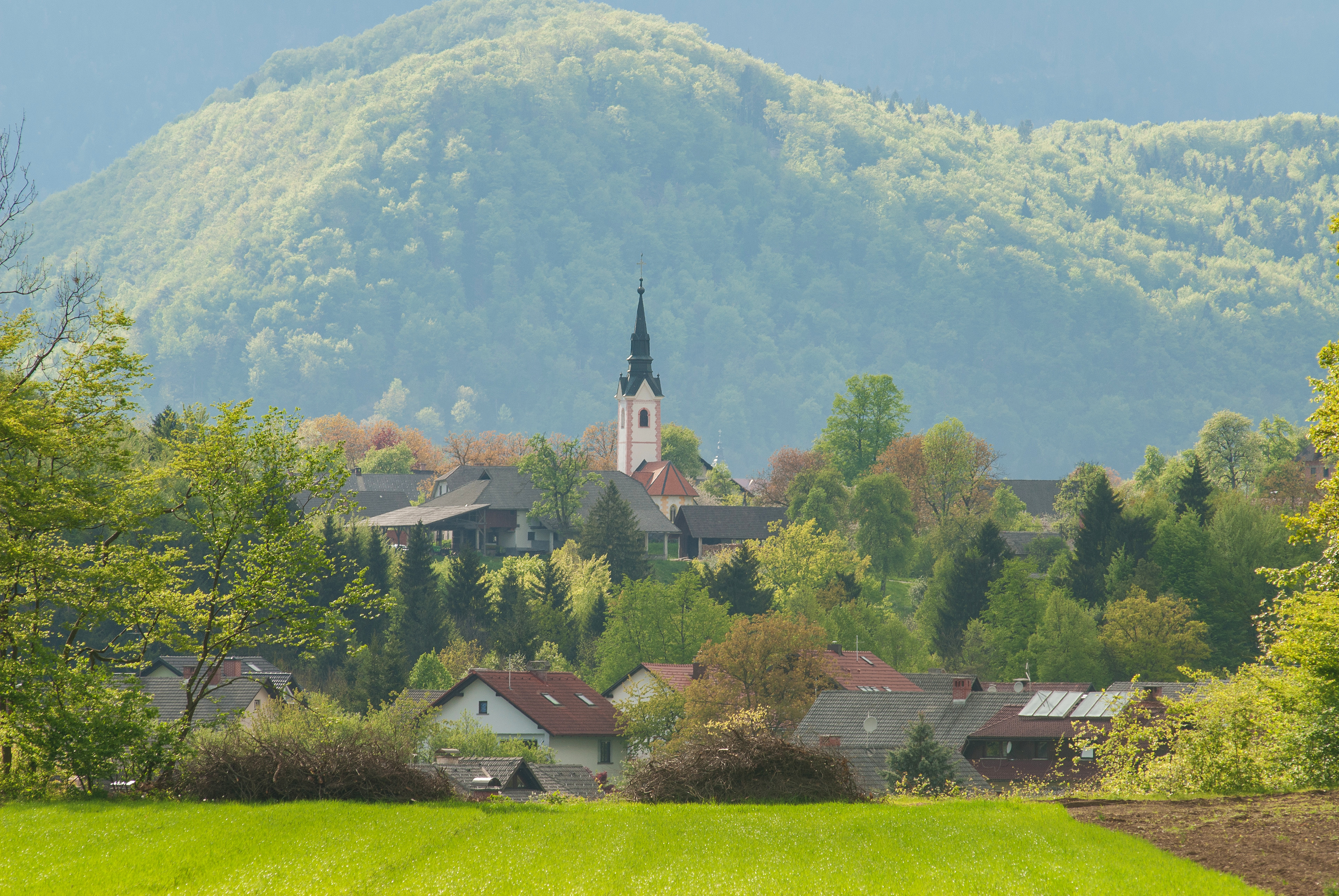
- View of Spodnja Besnica from Okroglo

- Location in Slovenia
- Coordinates: 46°15′32.95″N 14°17′59.29″E
- Country: Slovenia
- Traditional region: Upper Carniola
- Statistical region: Upper Carniola
- Municipality: Kranj

Area
  - Total: 1.93 km^{2} (0.75 sq mi)
- Elevation: 429.7 m (1,410 ft)

Population (2002)
  - Total: 866

Spodnja Besnica (pronounced [ˈspoːdnja ˈbeːsnitsa]; German: Unterweßnitz) is a village on the right bank of the Sava River in the Municipality of Kranj in the Upper Carniola region of Slovenia.

== Name ==
The name Spodnja Besnica means 'lower Besnica', contrasting with Zgornja Besnica 'upper Besnica', which lies 79 meters (259 ft) higher in elevation. The two villages were attested in historical documents as Vessnitz in 1421, referring to the stream of the same name. The name Besnica is originally a hydronym that was later applied to the settlement along Besnica Creek, a tributary of the Sava. The name is derived from the Slavic adjective *běsьnъ 'rushing, swift', referring the character of the stream.

== Church ==
The local church is dedicated to John the Baptist.
