= Gottschee =

Former German-speaking region in modern Slovenia

The Gottschee region in Slovenia today: the current Municipality of Kočevje

Gottschee (pronounced [ɡɔˈtʃeː], Slovene: Kočevsko) refers to a former German-speaking region in Carniola, a crownland of the Habsburg Empire, part of the historical and traditional region of Lower Carniola, now in Slovenia. The region has been a county, duchy, district, and municipality during various parts of its history. The term often also refers to the entire ethnolinguistic enclave regardless of administrative borders. Today Gottschee largely corresponds to the Municipality of Kočevje. The original German settlers of the region are called Gottschee Germans or Gottscheers, and their German dialect is called Gottschee German or Gottscheerish.

== Geography ==
The Gottschee enclave encompassed a roughly oval-shaped area between 45° 46′ N and 45° 30′ N, and between 14° 36′ E and 15° 9′ E. Geographers divided the enclave into seven regions based on valleys (from west to east):

- The Suchen Plateau (Suchener Hochtal) in the extreme west, with the (pre-1933) municipalities of Obergras and Suchen;
- The Back District (Hinterland) in the west, with the municipalities of Göttenitz, Hinterberg, Masern, Morobitz, Rieg, and Tiefenbach;
- The Upper District (Oberland) in the central area, with the municipalities of Lienfeld, Mitterdorf, and Seele, plus the city of Gottschee (Stadt Gottschee);
- The Lower District (Unterland) in the south-central area, with the municipalities of Graflinden, Mösel, Schwarzenbach, and Unterlag;
- The Forest District (Walden) in the north-central area, with the municipalities of Altlag, Ebenthal, Langenton, and Malgern;
- The Tschermoschnitz District (Moschnitze, Mosche) in the northeast, with the municipalities of Pöllandl, Stockendorf, and Tschermoschnitz;
- The Lower Side (Untere Seite) in the southeast, with the municipalities of Nesseltal and Unterdeutschau.

== History ==
=== Early history (13th century – 1623) ===
The Gottschee region was conferred upon the Counts of Ortenburg by the Patriarchate of Aquileia on 20 September 1277. (Note: The original Latin source reads 1247, but this is considered an error by scholars.) The territory was settled by German farmers from Carinthia and East Tyrol between 1330 and 1400. The first settlement in the territory attested in written sources was Mooswald (Slovene: Mahovnik), which appeared in a letter from Patriarch Bertram on 1 September 1339. A 1363 letter mentioned the settlements of Gottschee (Kočevje), Pölland (Kočevske Poljane), Kostel, Ossilnitz (Osilnica), and Göttenitz (Gotenica). The town of Gottschee acquired market town status in 1377.

With the extinction of the House of Ortenburg in 1418, the Gottschee area came under the control of the Counts of Celje in 1420. When the House of Celje died out in 1456, the territory came under the control of the House of Habsburg, dukes of Carniola. Emperor Frederick III elevated the town of Gottschee to a city in 1471.

The late 15th century began a time of unrest in Gottschee. Numerous Ottoman attacks took place in the region (in 1469, 1471, 1476, 1480, 1491, 1507, 1528, 1546, 1559, 1561, 1564, 1578, and 1584). It was partly in response to the devastation of the Ottoman raids that Emperor Frederick III granted the people of Gottschee the right to sell goods outside the territory in 1492. There were also six peasant uprisings in the territory, starting in 1515 and ending in 1662.

In 1507, Maximilian I mortgaged the Dominion of Gottschee (German: Herrschaft Gottschee, Slovene: Kočevsko gospostvo) to Count Jörg von Thurn. The territory was purchased by Hans Ungnad in 1524, and then mortgaged to the Croatian Counts of Blagay in 1547. In 1574, Gottschee extended from Mount Snežnik in the extreme west to Blatnik pri Črmošnjicah in the east, and from Seč and Gornja Topla Reber in the north to just below Bosljiva Loka and Osilnica in the south. In 1619, the territory was purchased by the Khisl family.

=== Gottschee County (1623–1791) ===
The territory was elevated to Gottschee County (German: Grafschaft Gottschee, Slovene: Kočevska grofija) in 1623. In 1641 Wolf Engelbert von Auersperg purchased Gottschee County from Count Georg Zwickl-Khisl for 84,000 florins. Engelbert abandoned the deteriorating castle at Friedrichstein and built a new castle in the town of Gottschee itself, which survived until the Second World War. Because Gottschee was a county, Engelbert thereby became a count himself. Because he died without an heir in 1673, the county passed to his brother Johann Weikhard of Auersperg, who had become a prince of the Holy Roman Empire in 1653. He combined Gottschee with some neighboring estates into a single domain. In 1774, Emperor Joseph II issued a patent allowing the residents of Gottschee County to sell citrus fruit and oil, and the emperor issued a patent confirming peddling privileges on 27 April 1785.

=== Duchy of Gottschee (1791–1809) ===
In 1791, Emperor Leopold II elevated the territory to the Duchy of Gottschee (German: Herzogtum Gottschee, Slovene: Kočevska Vojvodina) and Karl Josef Anton von Auersperg to the Duke of Gottschee.

=== Illyrian Provinces (1809–1814) ===
During the short-lived period of the Illyrian Provinces, Gottschee was part of the Napoleonic French Empire. Under this arrangement it was initially part of the Province of Ljubljana (French: province de Laybach) from 1809 to 1811, and then the Province of Carniola (French: province de Carniole) from 1811 to 1814. Gottschee constituted a separate administrative canton under this arrangement. The Gottscheers revolted against French rule during the 1809 Gottscheer Rebellion, killing the commissar of the Novo Mesto district, Von Gasparini. With the collapse of the Illyrian provinces, Gottschee was returned to Habsburg rule within the Kingdom of Illyria.

=== Kingdom of Illyria (1816–1849) ===
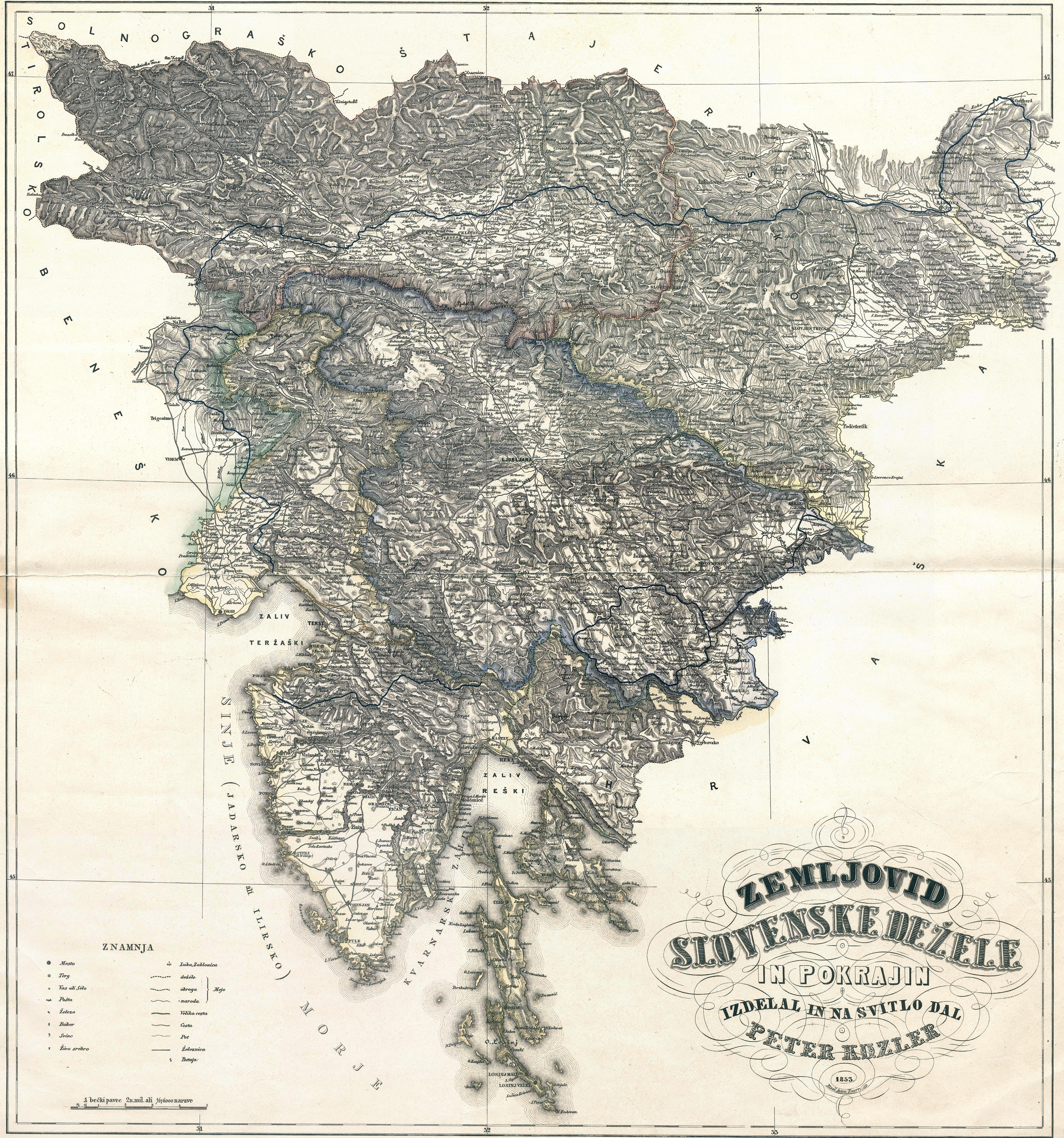
Peter Kozler's 1848 Map of Slovene lands and provinces with Gottschee outlined

As part of the Habsburg Kingdom of Illyria, Gottschee was administratively part of the Novo Mesto District (German: Neustädtler Kreis). The Kingdom of Illyria was succeeded by the reconstituted Duchy of Carniola in 1849.

=== Duchy of Carniola (1849–1918) ===
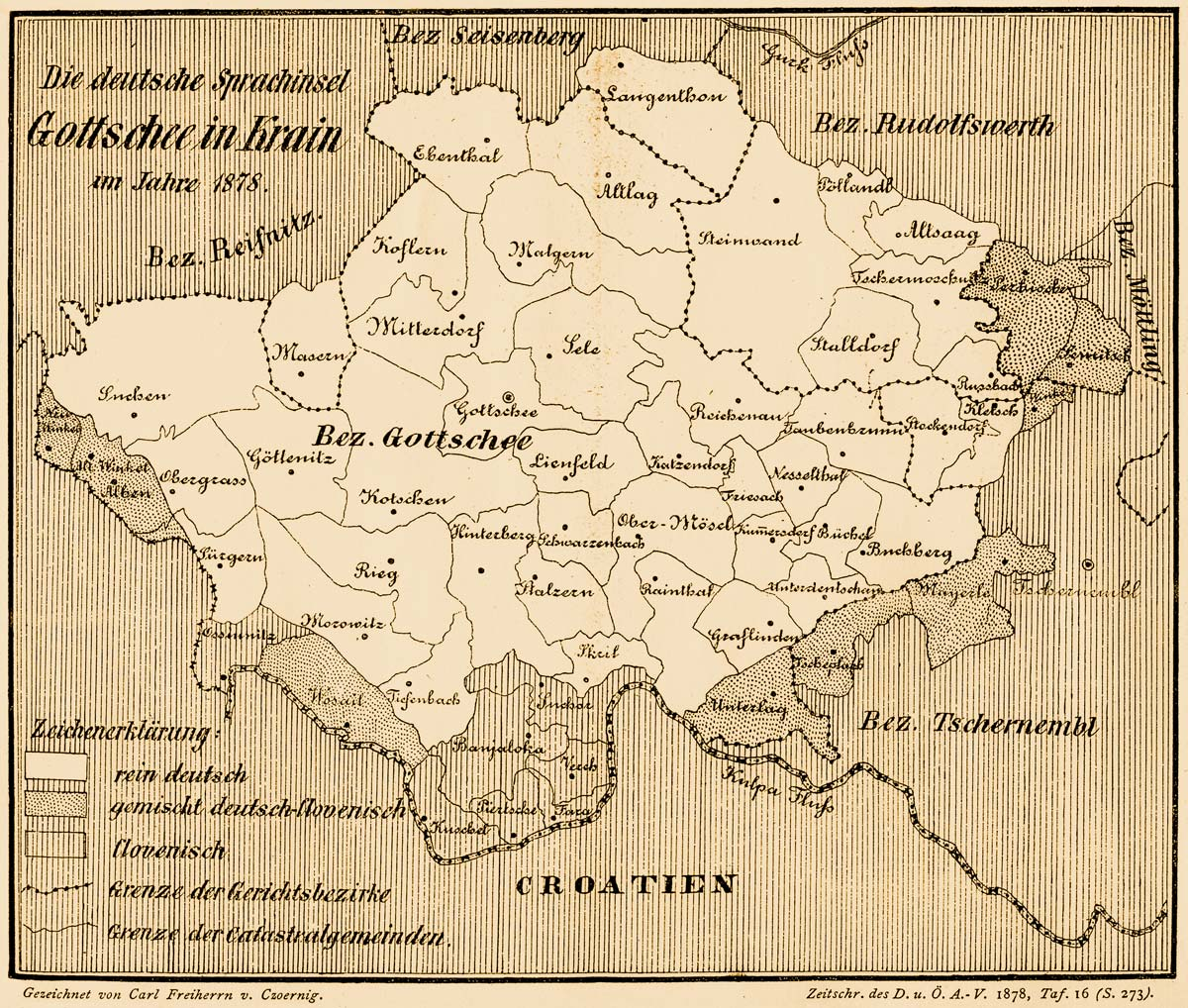
The Gottschee District and ethnic composition in 1878

Within the Duchy of Carniola, a separate administrative Gottschee District (German: Bezirk Gottschee or Gerichtsbezirk Gottschee) was set up. The district had an area of approximately 860 km^{2} (330 sq mi) and contained a total of 177 settlements (including ethnically Slovene ones and some abandoned before 1941). The Gottschee District was bordered (clockwise) by the districts of Ribnica (Reifnitz), Žužemberk (Seisenberg), Novo Mesto (Rudolfswerth), Metlika (Mötling), and Črnomelj (Tschernembl). Fully German or ethnically mixed Slovene-German territory extended into all of the neighboring districts. On 31 December 1869 the entire Kočevje District had 3,473 houses and a population of 18,432. Subtracting the ethnically Slovene communities of Osilnica (Osiunitz) and Kostel left a total of 2,966 houses and a population of 15,520 in ethnically German or German-majority territory in the district itself. Adding in ethnically German houses and population from communities adjacent to the district resulted in a total of 4,161 houses and a population of 21,301 in the culturally German Gottschee area. Czörnig estimated the total Gottschee German population in 1878, accounting for population growth and men working away from home, to be about 25,000.

Map of Aurel Popovici's proposal of a United States of Greater Austria (1906), with Gottschee as an autonomous district

In 1906 the ethnic Romanian Austro-Hungarian lawyer and politician Aurel Popovici unsuccessfully proposed the reorganization of Austria-Hungary as the United States of Greater Austria. Popovici's proposal included Gottschee as a separate autonomous district within the proposed state of Carniola.

=== Kingdom of Yugoslavia (1918–1941) ===
Gottschee was incorporated into royal Yugoslavia (known as the Kingdom of Serbs, Croats and Slovenes until 1929) as part of the prewar territory of Carniola. The Gottschee Germans accepted the new arrangement with some reluctance: in February 1918 Gottschee's ethnically German priests characterized the proposed new state as "treacherous" and sent a letter to Bishop Anton Bonaventura Jeglič in Ljubljana denouncing the plan. In October 1918 a proposal was prepared for the Paris Peace Conference for Gottschee to become an independent republic (German: Republik Gottschee) under American protection, based on the large Gottschee German population in the United States, and a Gottschee German demonstration demanding autonomy was held in New York in January 1919. There were also unsuccessful proposals to establish a Gottschee Republic with Italian backing. In 1920, the Slovene press characterized the proposal for a Gottschee Republic as communist agitation.

Under the 1921 constitution, the traditional regions were abolished and Gottschee was made part of the Ljubljana Province (Slovene: Ljubljanska oblast) from 1922 to 1929. After the provinces were abolished, Gottschee was part of the larger Drava Banovina (Dravska banovina) from 1929 to 1941. Within the very large Kočevje District (Slovene: Srez Kočevje), 22 local communities or small municipalities (občina) largely encompassed Gottschee territory until 1933, continuing its 19th-century organization. Many Gottschee settlements were outside the Kočevje District. In 1933, a Yugoslav administrative reform created large municipalities (občina) organized within the districts (srez). The Kočevje District was the largest district in the Drava Banovina, extending from Veliki Ločnik in the north to the Croatian border in the south. Gottschee territory was encompassed by 11 large municipalities, not all of which were in the Kočevje District.

During this time, political and assimilatory pressure against the German minority caused many of Gottschee Germans to emigrate: the German-language high school was closed in 1918, German was eliminated as an elective subject in schools in 1925, the majority of German business, cultural, and athletics societies were dissolved, and there was forced Slovenization of the names of villages and people. By 1941 the Gottschee German population had fallen to only about 12,500. Most of the Germans fled back to Austria or emigrated to the United States (mainly New York City or Cleveland, Ohio.)

=== Second World War ===
After the outbreak of World War II in 1939, Yugoslavia initially remained neutral, but after a coup in 1941 adopted a staunch anti-Axis position. This led to a German and Italian invasion and occupation of the Kingdom. The Gottscheers were in the Italian occupation zone after Yugoslavia's surrender, which Hitler could not abide. Nazi racial policy dictated that these Germans had to be brought back into the Reich. The Nazis established a branch of the Resettlement Administration (Volksdeutsche Mittelstelle, or "VoMi") at Maribor for this purpose.

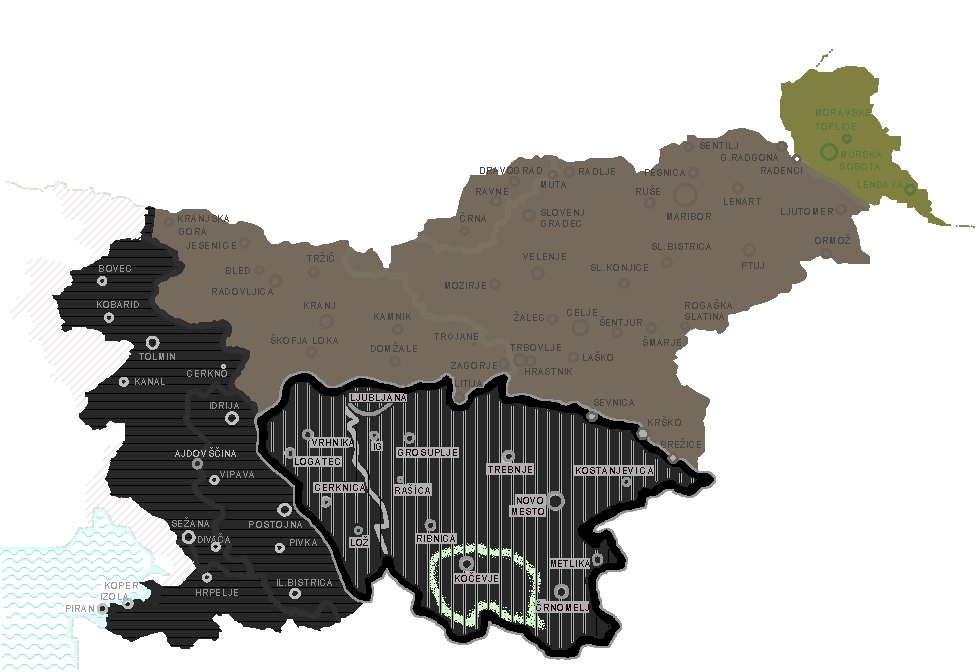
A map of the Italian-administered Province of Ljubljana, with the Gottschee German ethnic enclave circled on the map.

While some of the Gottscheer community leaders had embraced National Socialism and agitated for "assistance" and "repatriation" to the Reich before the German invasion in 1941, most Gottscheers had no interest in reuniting with Greater Germany or joining the Nazis. They had been integrated into society with their Slovene neighbours, often intermarrying among Slovenes and becoming bilingual while maintaining their Germanic language and customs since their arrival in the region in the late 14th century.

However, propaganda and Nazi ideology prevailed, and the VoMi began planning the Gottschee "resettlement" (forced expulsion) from Kočevje, which was in the Italian occupation zone, to the "Ranner Dreieck" or Brežice Triangle in Lower Styria, the region now known as the Lower Sava Valley, located between the confluences of the Krka, Sotla, and Sava rivers.

In November 1941, some 46,000 Slovenians in the Brežice Triangle region were forcibly deported to Eastern Germany for potential Germanization or forced labour in order to make an accommodation for the Gottschee "resettlers". Shortly before that time, a largely transparent propaganda effort was aimed toward both the Gottscheers and the Slovenes, promising the latter equivalent farmland in Germany for the land relinquished. The Gottscheers were given Reich passports and transportation to the Lower Sava Valley just after the forced departure of the Slovenes. Most Gottschee left their homes because of coercion and threats since the VoMi had a deadline of December 31, 1941 for the mass movement of both groups. Gottscheers were removed from a total of 167 settlements in 1941 and 1942.

The eviction was organized as a series of 25 resettlement groups (German: Stürme), numbered Go 1 through Go 25 and named after major settlements:

Group	Name	Settlements
Go 1	Mooswald	Gottschee, Mooswald
Go 2	Mitterdorf	Klindorf, Koflern, Malgern, Mitterdorf, Neuloschin, Niederloschin, Oberloschin, Obrern, Rain, Windischdorf
Go 3	Mösel	Dürnbach, Lichtenbach, Niedermösel, Oberfliegendorf, Obermösel, Otterbach, Reintal, Unterfliegendorf, Verderb, Verdreng
Go 4	Rieg	Handlern, Hinterberg, Hornberg, Kotschen, Moos, Mrauen, Oberwetzenbach, Rieg, Stalzern, Suchenreuther, Unterwetzenbach
Go 5	Nesselthal	Altfriesach, Büchel, Kummersdorf, Mitterbuchberg, Nesselthal, Neufriesach, Oberbuchberg, Reichenau, Tanzbüchel, Untersteinwand
Go 6	Altlag	Altbacher, Altlag, Grintowitz, Hohenberg, Kletsch, Langenton, Neubacher, Neulag, Riegel, Tiefenreuther, Weißenstein, Winkel
Go 7	Grafenfeld	Grafenfeld, Lienfeld
Go 8	Hasenfeld	Hasenfeld, Schwarzenbach

Group	Name	Settlements
Go 9	Graflinden	Graflinden, Römergrund
Go 10	Unterdeutschau	Oberdeutschau, Unterbuchberg, Unterdeutschau
Go 11	Hohenegg	Hohenegg, Katzendorf
Go 12	Seele	Schalkendorf, Seele, Zwischlern
Go 13	Masern	Masereben, Masern
Go 14	Göttenitz	Göttenitz
Go 15	Morobitz	Inlauf, Morobitz
Go 16	Tiefenbach	Niedertiefenbach, Obertiefenbach, Pröse

Group	Name	Settlements
Go 17	Ebental	Ebental, Kukendorf, Setsch, Tiefental
Go 18	Warmberg	Komutzen, Kuntschen, Rottenstein, Warmberg
Go 19	Pöllandl	Dranbank, Krapflern, Pöllandl, Steinwand
Go 20	Stockendorf	Altlagbüchel, Kletsch, Lachina, Sporeben, Stockendorf, Töplitzel
Go 21	Unterlag	Neugereuth, Oberpockstein, Unterlag, Unterpockstein
Go 22	Russbach	Russbach, Wretzen
Go 23	Tschermoschnitz	Drandul, Gehack, Mitterdorf, Obermitterdorf, Ressen, Ribnig, Scheerenbrunn, Stalldorf, Tschermoschnitz, Untertappelwerch
Go 24	Suchen	Bärenheim, Gehack, Mittergrass, Obergrass, Suchen
Go 25	Maierle	Bistritz, Maierle, Schäflein, Warmberg

Although from the time of their arrival to the end of the war, Gottschee farmers were harassed and killed by Josip Broz Tito's Partisans, 56 of the Gottschee ethnic Germans, who did not want to leave their homes, decided instead to join Slovene Partisans and fight against Italians in Province of Ljubljana, together with their Slovene neighbours.

The attempt to resettle the Gottscheers was a costly failure for the Nazi regime, since extra manpower was required to protect the farmers from the partisans. The deported Slovenes were taken to several camps in Saxony, where they were forced to work on German farms or in factories run by German industries from 1941 to 1945. The forced labourers were not always kept in formal Nazi concentration camps, but often just vacant buildings where they slept until the next day's labour took them outside these quarters. Toward the end of the war, these camps were liberated by American and Red Army troops, and repatriated refugees later returned to Yugoslavia.

The fate of the resettled Gottschee was not much better, and in some cases much worse. At the end of the war the Nazi regime in the region evaporated as soldiers and administrators fled.

=== Postwar Yugoslavia ===
After the war, Josef Broz Tito took control of Yugoslavia, and the Gottschee Germans were not welcome to return to their homes, many of which had been destroyed. They were relocated to displaced person camps in Austria, often in poor conditions. This resulted in many of the Gottschee Germans leaving for North America, and communities of Gottschee Germans exist in Queens, New York; Cleveland, Ohio; and Toronto, Canada.

== List of Gottschee German villages ==
This table includes villages in the 19th-century Gottschee District based on maps in Mitja Ferenc's works (2007, 2011–2013).

Slovene	Municipality	German	Gottscheerish	District 19th c.	Municipality 19th c.	Parish 19th c.	Note
Ašelice	Semič	Aschletz	Aschelitz	Rudolfswerth	Tschermoschnitz	Tschermoschnitz	Now part of Mašelj
Beli Kamen	Kočevje	Weißenstein	Beißnstuain	Gottschee	Altlag	Altlag	Now part of Stari Log
Bistrica	Črnomelj	Bistritz	Bistritz	Tschernembl	Döblitsch	Döblitsch	
Blatnik pri Črmošnjicah	Semič	Rußbach	Rüßpoch	Rudolfswerth	Tschermoschnitz	Tschermoschnitz	
Blaževica, Spodnja Blaževica	Dolenjske Toplice	Unterblaschowitz	Untrplaschobitz	Rudolfswerth	Tschermoschnitz	Tschermoschnitz	Now part of Verdun pri Uršnih Selih
Borovec pri Kočevski Reki	Kočevje	Morobitz	Mröbitz	Gottschee	Morobitz	Morobitz	
Breg pri Kočevju	Kočevje	Rein, Rain	Roain	Gottschee	Mitterdorf	Mitterdorf	
Brezje	Kočevje	Friesach		Gottschee	Nesseltal	Nesseltal	See: Laze pri Oneku, Staro Brezje
Brezovica pri Črmošnjicah, Brezje	Semič	Wretzen, Wrezen	Brezə	Rudolfswerth	Tschermoschnitz	Tschermoschnitz	
Brezovica pri Predgradu	Kočevje	Bresowitz		Tschernembl	Tscheplach	Unterdeutschau	
Bukova Gora	Kočevje	Buchberg	Puəchparg	Gottschee	Nesseltal	Nesseltal	A collective name for Gorenja Bukova Gora, Spodnja Bukova Gora, and Srednja Bukova Gora
Cesta (pri Starem Logu)	Kočevje	Winkel	Straßle	Gottschee	Altlag	Altlag	Now part of Pugled pri Starem Logu
Cink, Frata	Dolenjske Toplice	Zinken		Rudolfswerth	Pöllandl	Pöllandl	Now part of Podstenice
Črmošnjice	Semič	Tschermoschnitz	Moscha, Moschnitz	Rudolfswerth	Tschermoschnitz	Tschermoschnitz	
Črni Potok pri Kočevju	Kočevje	Schwarzenbach	Schbourznpoch	Gottschee	Schwarzenbach	Gottschee	
Cvišlerji	Kočevje	Zwischlern	Zwishlarə	Gottschee	Seele	Gottschee	
Deleči Vrh, Deleči Hrib, Daleč Vrh, Daleč Hrib	Dolenjske Toplice	Laubbüchel	Lapiechl	Rudolfswerth	Pöllandl	Pöllandl	Now part of Podstenice
Divji Potok, Vildpoh	Dolenjske Toplice	Oberwildbach, Wildbach	Bilpoch	Rudolfswerth	Tschermoschnitz	Tschermoschnitz	Now part of Nova Gora
Doblička Gora	Črnomelj	Döblitschberg					
Dolga Vas	Kočevje	Grafenfeld, Krapfenfeld	Kropfnwold	Gottschee	Lienfeld	Gottschee	
Dolnja Briga	Kočevje	Niedertiefenbach	Tiəmpoch, Tiəfmpoch	Gottschee	Tiefenbach	Morobitz	
Dolnja Topla Reber	Kočevje	Unterwarmberg	Üntrburmparg	Seisenberg	Langenton	Unterwarmberg	Now part of Topla Reber
Dolnje Ložine, Srednje Ložine, Spodnje Ložine	Kočevje	Niederloschin, Unterloschin	Niedrloschin, Untrloschin	Gottschee	Mitterdorf	Mitterdorf	
Draga	Kočevje	Suchen	Shuəchə	Gottschee	Morobitz	Morobitz	Now part of Borovec pri Kočevski Reki
Draga	Loški Potok	Suchen	Shiugə	Gottschee	Suchen	Suchen	
Gaber pri Črmošnjicah	Semič	Gaber	Gabər	Rudolfswerth	Tschermoschnitz	Tschermoschnitz	
Gače	Semič	Gatschen	Gatschn	Rudolfswerth	Tschermoschnitz	Tschermoschnitz	Now part of Komarna Vas
Glažuta	Loški Potok	Karlshütten	Gloschhittn	Gottschee	Obergras	Suchen	
Golobinjek	Semič	Taubenbrunn	Taubndaf, Taubndoarf	Gottschee	Nesseltal	Nesseltal	Now part of Planina
Gorenja Bukova Gora	Kočevje	Oberbuchberg	Gailoch	Gottschee	Nesseltal	Nesseltal	Now part of Bukova Gora
Gorenja Loka, Gorenja Nemška Loka	Kočevje	Oberdeutschau	Tearöscht	Gottschee	Nesseltal	Nesseltal	Now part of Hrib pri Koprivniku
Gorenje	Kočevje	Obrern	Öbrarə	Gottschee	Mitterdorf	Mitterdorf	
Gorenji Mačkovec	Kočevje	Oberkatzendorf	Pinugl	Gottschee	Nesseltal	Nesseltal	Now part of Laze pri Oneku
Gornja Briga	Kočevje	Obertiefenbach	Brigə	Gottschee	Tiefenbach	Morobitz	
Gornja Topla Reber	Kočevje	Oberwarmberg	Öbrbourmparg	Seisenberg	Langenton	Unterwarmberg	Now part of Topla Reber
Gornje Ložine	Kočevje	Oberloschin	Öbrloschin	Gottschee	Mitterdorf	Mitterdorf	
Gotenica	Kočevje	Göttenitz	Gənize	Gottschee	Göttenitz	Göttenitz	
Gradec	Črnomelj	Grodetz, Groditz, Grodez	Grodetz	Gottschee	Nesseltal	Nesseltal	Now part of Rožič Vrh
Grčarice	Ribnica	Masern	Masharə	Reifnitz	Masern	Malgern	
Grčarske Ravne	Ribnica	Masereben	Masharebn	Reifnitz	Masern	Malgern	
Gričice	Semič	Obermitterdorf	Gritschitzə	Rudolfswerth	Tschermoschnitz	Tschermoschnitz	Now part of Komarna Vas
Grintovec	Kočevje	Grintowitz	Grintəbitz	Gottschee	Malgern	Altlag	Now part of Kleč
Hrib pri Koprivniku	Kočevje	Büchel	Piechl	Gottschee	Nesseltal	Nesseltal	
Huterhaiser	Kočevje	Hutterhäuser		Gottschee	Gottschee	Gottschee	Now part of Kočevje
Inlauf	Kočevje	Inlauf	Inlaf, Enlaf	Gottschee	Morobitz	Morobitz	Now part of Borovec pri Kočevski Reki
Jelendol	Ribnica	Hirschgruben, Hirisgruben	Hirisgruəbn	Reifnitz	Masern	Malgern	
Jelenja Vas, Iskrba	Kočevje	Hirisgruben, Hirschgruben	Hirisgruəbə	Gottschee	Hinterberg	Rieg	Now part of Štalcerji
Kačji Potok	Kočevje	Otterbach	Öttrpoch	Gottschee	Mösel	Mösel	
Kleč, Kleče	Kočevje	Kletsch (bei Altlag)	Kletsch	Gottschee	Malgern	Altlag	
Kleč, Kleče	Semič	Kletsch (bei Stockendorf)	Kletsch	Tschernembl	Stockendorf	Stockendorf	Now part of Planina
Klinja Vas	Kočevje	Klindorf	Klindoarf	Gottschee	Seele	Gottschee	
Knežja Lipa	Kočevje	Graflinden	pei dər Lintən	Gottschee	Graflinden	Unterlag	
Koblarji	Kočevje	Koflern	Kowlarn, in de Kowlara	Gottschee	Mitterdorf	Mitterdorf	
Kočarji, Kožarji	Kočevje	Niedermösel	Götscharə	Gottschee	Mösel	Mösel	
Koče	Kočevje	Kotschen	Götschə	Gottschee	Kotschen	Rieg	
Kočevje	Kočevje	Gottschee	Gətscheab, Stott, Stattle	Gottschee	Gottschee	Gottschee	
Kočevska Reka	Kočevje	Rieg	Riaggə, an dr Riəggn	Gottschee	Rieg	Rieg	
Kočevske Poljane	Dolejnske Toplice	Pöllandl	Pelond	Rudolfswerth	Pöllandl	Pöllandl	
Komarna Vas	Semič	Muckendorf, Obertappelwerch	Muckndoarf	Rudolfswerth	Tschermoschnitz	Tschermoschnitz	
Komolec	Kočevje	Komutzen	Komüzə	Seisenberg	Langenton	Unterwarmberg	
Konca Vas, Konec	Kočevje	Ort	Oart	Gottschee	Mitterdorf	Mitterdorf	
Konjski Hrib	Semič	Roßbüchel	Röschpiechl	Tschernembl	Stockendorf	Stockendorf	Now part of Planina
Koprivnik	Kočevje	Nesseltal, Nesselthal	Neßltol, Eßtol	Gottschee	Nesseltal	Nesseltal	
Kozice, Parga	Kočevje	Kositzen, Kositzenberg	Afn Pargə	Gottschee	Unterlag	Unterlag	Now part of Spodnji Log
Kuhlarji	Kočevje	Küchlern	Kichlarn	Gottschee	Mösel	Mösel	
Kukovo	Dobrepolje	Kukendorf	Kukndoarf	Gottschee	Ebental	Ebental	Now part of Rapljevo
Kumrova Vas, Kumrovo	Kočevje	Kummerdorf	Kümmrdoarf	Gottschee	Nesseltal	Nesseltal	Now part of Svetli Potok
Kunč	Dolenjske Toplice	Kuntschen	Kuntschn	Seisenberg	Langenton	Unterwarmberg	Now part of Podstenice
Lahinja	Semič	Lachina	Lachinə	Tschernembl	Stockendorf	Stockendorf	Now part of Planina
Lapinje	Kočevje	Neugereuth, Laubbüchel	Lapiechl	Gottschee	Unterlag	Unterlag	Now part of Podlesje
Laze	Novo Mesto	Reuter, Reuther, Laase	Reuter	Rudolfswerth	Tschermoschnitz	Tschermoschnitz	
Laze pri Oneku	Kočevje	Neufriesach	Biedröß	Gottschee	Nesseltal	Nesseltal	
Lazec	Loški Potok	Gehack, Gehag	Gəhack	Gottschee	Suchen	Suchen	
Livold	Kočevje	Lienfeld	Liəwold	Gottschee	Lienfeld	Gottschee	
Luža	Kočevje	Lacknern, Laknern		Seisenberg	Langenton	Unterwarmberg	Now part of Komolec
Mačkovec	Kočevje	Katzendorf	Kotzndoarf	Gottschee	Seele	Gottschee	
Mahovnik, Mošvald	Kočevje	Mooswald	Mööschbold	Gottschee	Gottschee	Gottschee	
Mala Gora	Kočevje	Malgern	Maugrarn	Gottschee	Malgern	Mitterdorf	
Mali Rigelj	Dolenjske Toplice	Kleinrigel, Schriegl	Riegl	Rudolfswerth	Pöllandl	Pöllandl	
Mašelj	Semič	Maschel	Maschl	Rudolfswerth	Tschermoschnitz	Tschermoschnitz	
Mavrlen	Črnomelj	Maierle	Maiərle	Tschernembl	Döblitsch	Tschernembl	
Medvedjek	Loški Potok	Bärenheim		Gottschee	Obergras	Suchen	Now part of Trava
Miklarji	Črnomelj	Brunngeräuth	Prunngreit	Tschernembl	Döblitsch	Döblitsch	
Mirna Gora	Semič	Friedensberg, Friedbüchel					
Mlaka pri Kočevju	Kočevje	Kerndorf	Kearndoarf	Gottschee	Mitterdorf	Mitterdorf	
Mlaka pri Kočevski Reki	Kočevje	Moos	Möösch	Gottschee	Kotschen	Rieg	
Mokri Potok, Spodnji Vecenbah	Kočevje	Unterwetzenbach	Üntrbetznpoch	Gottschee	Rieg	Rieg	
Morava	Kočevje	Mrauen	Mragə	Gottschee	Hinterberg	Rieg	
Mozelj, Gorenji Mozelj	Kočevje	Obermösel, Mösel	Öbrmesl, Mesl	Gottschee	Mösel	Mösel	
Mrtvice	Kočevje	Gschwend	Gschwend	Gottschee	Mitterdorf	Mitterdorf	
Mrzli Potok	Kočevje	Kaltenbrunn	Kaotnprunn	Gottschee	Göttenitz	Göttenitz	Now part of Gotenica
Muha Vas, Gorenja Turkova Draga	Kočevje	Oberfliegendorf	Wliəgndoarf	Gottschee	Mösel	Mösel	
Nemška Loka	Kočevje	Unterdeutschau	Agə	Gottschee	Unterdeutschau	Unterdeutschau	
Nova Gora	Dolenjske Toplice	Neuberg	Neiəparg	Rudolfswerth	Tschermoschnitz	Tschermoschnitz	
Nove Ložine	Kočevje	Neuloschin	Kuttlar	Gottschee	Mitterdorf	Mitterdorf	
Novi Breg	Kočevje	Neubacher, Schupfen	Schupfə	Gottschee	Malgern	Altlag	Now part of Trnovec
Novi Lazi	Kočevje	Hinterberg	Hintrparg	Gottschee	Hinterberg	Rieg	
Novi Log, Mali Log	Kočevje	Neulag	Shuəchə	Gottschee	Altlag	Altlag	Now part of Stari Log
Novi Tabor	Semič	Neutabor	Tawr	Rudolfswerth	Tschermoschnitz	Tschermoschnitz	Now part of Črmošnjice
Občice	Dolenjske Toplice	Krapflern	Kropflarn	Rudolfswerth	Pöllandl	Pöllandl	
Ograja	Kočevje	Suchenreuther, Suchenreuter	Ziachnreitər	Gottschee	Hinterberg	Rieg	
Onek	Kočevje	Hohenegg	Wrneggə	Gottschee	Seele	Gottschee	
Ovčjak	Črnomelj	Schäflein	Scheflein, Schaffle	Gottschee	Nesseltal	Nesseltal	Now part of Rožič Vrh
Pajkež, Zgornja Blaževica	Dolenjske Toplice	Oberblaschowitz	Peikous	Rudolfswerth	Tschermoschnitz	Tschermoschnitz	Now part of Dobindol
Planina	Semič	Stockendorf	də Aobə, Stockendoarf	Tschernembl	Stockendorf	Stockendorf	
Pleš	Dolenjske Toplice	Plösch	Plesch	Rudolfswerth	Tschermoschnitz	Tschermoschnitz	Now part of Dobindol
Pleš	Kočevje	Plösch	Plesch	Gottschee	Morobitz	Morobitz	Now part of Borovec pri Kočevski Reki
Podlesje, Ferdreng	Kočevje	Verdreng	Wrdreng	Gottschee	Mösel	Mösel	
Podpreska	Loški Potok	Merleinsraut, Merleinsrauth	Malaschrout	Gottschee	Suchen	Suchen	
Podstene	Kočevje	Untersteinwand, Neubüchel	Neipichl, Eipichl	Gottschee	Nesseltal	Nesseltal	
Podstenice	Dolenjske Toplice	Steinwand	Stuoinbond	Rudolfswerth	Pöllandl	Pöllandl	
Pogorelec	Dolenjske Toplice	Pogorelz	Pogrelz	Rudolfswerth	Pöllandl	Pöllandl	Now part of Podstenice
Polom	Kočevje	Ebental	Ebentou, Ebntol	Gottschee	Ebental	Ebental	
Ponikve	Semič	Sporeben	Schporebm	Tschernembl	Stockendorf	Stockendorf	Now part of Planina
Prerigelj	Kočevje	Prerigel	Preariegl	Gottschee	Unterdeutschau	Unterdeutschau	
Preža	Kočevje	Pröse	Preashə	Gottschee	Tiefenbach	Rieg	
Prežulje	Kočevje	Präsuln, Presuln	Preshulə	Gottschee	Tiefenbach	Morobitz	
Primoži, Handlerji, Handlarji	Kočevje	Handlern	Handlarə	Gottschee	Kotschen	Rieg	
Pugled pri Starem Logu	Kočevje	Hohenberg	Hoachnparg	Gottschee	Altlag	Altlag	
Rajhenav	Kočevje	Reichenau	Reichnagə	Gottschee	Nesseltal	Nesseltal	
Rajndol	Kočevje	Reinthal, Reintal	Reintol	Gottschee	Mösel	Mösel	
Rampoha	Dolenjske Toplice	Dranbank	Dranponk	Rudolfswerth	Pöllandl	Pöllandl	Now part of Občice
Ramsrigelj	Kočevje	Ramsriegel	Ramschriegl	Gottschee	Unterlag	Unterlag	Now part of Knežja Lipa
Ravne	Kočevje	Eben	Ebn, Ebnə	Gottschee	Morobitz	Morobitz	Now part of Borovec pri Kočevski Reki
Rdeči Kamen	Kočevje	Rotenstein	Roatnstoin	Seisenberg	Langenton	Unterwarmberg	Now part of Komolec
Resa	Semič	Ressen	Reasn	Rudolfswerth	Tschermoschnitz	Tschermoschnitz	Now part of Komarna Vas
Ribnik	Semič	Ribnig	Rimmnig	Rudolfswerth	Tschermoschnitz	Tschermoschnitz	Now part of Komarna Vas
Rigelj	Kočevje	Riegel	Riegl	Gottschee	Malgern	Altlag	Now part of Stari Breg
Rimsko, Remergrund	Kočevje	Römergrund	Remrgründ	Gottschee	Graflinden	Unterlag	Now part of Knežja Lipa
Rodine	Črnomelj	Rodine		Tschernembl	Tschernembl	Tschernembl	
Rog	Kočevje	Hornwald	Hoarnwald	Rudolfswerth	Pöllandl	Pöllandl	Now part of Trnovec
Rogati Hrib	Kočevje	Hornberg	Hoarnparg	Gottschee	Hinterberg	Rieg	
Sadni Hrib, (Z)gornji Vecenbah	Kočevje	Oberwetzenbach	Öbrbetznpoch	Gottschee	Rieg	Rieg	
Šalka Vas	Kočevje	Schalkendorf	Schaokndoarf	Gottschee	Seele	Gottschee	
Seč	Kočevje	Setsch	Setsch	Gottschee	Ebental	Ebental	
Seč	Novo Mesto	Gehack, Gehag	Gəhack	Rudolfswerth	Tschermoschnitz	Tschermoschnitz	Now part of Travni Dol
Šenberk, Šenberg, Šenperg	Kočevje	Schönberg	Scheanparg	Gottschee	Altlag	Altlag	Now part of Stari Log
Škrilj, Dolenje Zdihovo	Kočevje	Unterskrill	Schkril	Gottschee	Mösel	Mösel	
Škrilj	Semič	Skrill	Schgriel	Tschernembl	Stockendorf	Stockendorf	Now part of Planina
Slaba Gorica	Črnomelj	Schlechtbüchel	Schlachtpiechl	Gottschee	Nesseltal	Nesseltal	Now part of Rožič Vrh
Slovenska Vas	Kočevje	Windischdorf	Bindischdoarf	Gottschee	Mitterdorf	Mitterdorf	
Smrečnik	Semič	Feichtbüchel	Waichtpiechl	Rudolfswerth	Tschermoschnitz	Tschermoschnitz	Now part of Komarna Vas
Smuka	Kočevje	Langenton	Zmuk	Seisenberg	Langenton	Unterwarmberg	
Spodnja Bukova Gora, Dolenja Bukova Gora	Kočevje	Unterbuchberg	Untrpuərchparg	Gottschee	Nesseltal	Nesseltal	Now part of Bukova Gora
Spodnji Log	Kočevje	Unterlag	Ünterloag	Gottschee	Unterlag	Unterlag	
Spodnji Pokštajn	Kočevje	Unterpockstein	Üntrpöckstuain	Gottschee	Unterlag	Unterlag	Now part of Podlesje
Sredgora	Semič	Mittenwald	Mittnbold	Tschernembl	Stockendorf	Stockendorf	
Srednja Bukova Gora	Kočevje	Mitterbuchberg	Mittrpuəchparg	Gottschee	Nesseltal	Nesseltal	Now part of Bukova Gora
Srednja Vas	Semič	Mitterdorf	Mitterdoarf	Rudolfswerth	Tschermoschnitz	Tschermoschnitz	
Srednja Vas pri Dragi	Loški Potok	Mittergrass, Mittergras	Hentərdiafle	Gottschee	Obergras	Suchen	
Srobotnik	Dolenjske Toplice	Gutenberg	Liəlochpargəl	Rudolfswerth	Tschermoschnitz	Tschermoschnitz	Now part of Občice
Štalcerji, Štalcarji	Kočevje	Stalzern	Schtauzar	Gottschee	Hinterberg	Rieg	
Štale	Semič	Stalldorf	Schtoll, Schtolldoarf	Rudolfswerth	Tschermoschnitz	Tschermoschnitz	Now part of Komarna Vas
Stara Cerkev	Kočevje	Mitterdorf	Mittrdoaf	Gottschee	Mitterdorf	Mitterdorf	
Stare Žage	Dolenjske Toplice	Altsag	Autshug, Aotschock	Rudolfswerth	Tschermoschnitz	Tschermoschnitz	
Stari Breg	Kočevje	Altbacher	Pachrn	Gottschee	Malgern	Altlag	
Stari Log	Kočevje	Altlag	Autloag	Gottschee	Altlag	Altlag	
Stari Tabor	Semič	Alttabor	Autrtawr	Rudolfswerth	Tschermoschnitz	Tschermoschnitz	Now part of Brezovica pri Črmošnjicah
Staro Brezje	Kočevje	Altfriesach	Wriəshoch	Gottschee	Nesseltal	Nesseltal	
Starološki Grič	Semič	Altlagbüchel	Autlogpichl, Lockpiechl	Gottschee	Nesseltal	Nesseltal	Now part of Planina
Stražnji Vrh	Črnomelj	Straßenberg					
Studeno	Kočevje	Brunnsee	Sheab, Prunnsheab	Gottschee	Nesseltal	Nesseltal	Now part of Knežja Lipa
Suhi Potok, Suha Vas	Kočevje	Durnbach, Dürnbach	Dürnpoch	Gottschee	Mösel	Mösel	
Sušje, Draga, Deroh	Črnomelj	Suchen	Därroch	Gottschee	Nesseltal	Nesseltal	Now part of Rožič Vrh
Svetli Potok	Kočevje	Lichtenbach	Liəmpoch	Gottschee	Nesseltal	Nesseltal	
Tanči Vrh, Tancbihel, Tanče Gorice, Tancpihelj	Kočevje	Tanzbüchel	Tonzpiechl	Gottschee	Nesseltal	Nesseltal	Now part of Hrib pri Koprivniku
Topličice	Semič	Töplitzel	Teplitzle	Tschernembl	Stockendorf	Stockendorf	Now part of Sredgora
Topli Vrh (nad Bistrico)	Črnomelj	Warmberg	Buərmparg	Gottschee	Nesseltal	Nesseltal	Now part of Rožič Vrh
Topli Vrh (pri Črmošnjicah)	Semič	Untertap(pe)lwerch	Topobach	Rudolfswerth	Tschermoschnitz	Tschermoschnitz	Now part of Črmošnjice
Trava	Loški Potok	Obergrass, Obergras	Woardearfle	Gottschee	Obergras	Suchen	
Travni Dol	Novo Mesto	Drandul	Trandul	Rudolfswerth	Tschermoschnitz	Tschermoschnitz	
Travnik	Semič	Scherenbrunn, Grossberg	Schernprün, Groschparg, Grasberg	Rudolfswerth	Tschermoschnitz	Tschermoschnitz	Now part of Komarna Vas
Trnovec	Kočevje	Tiefenreuter, Trinovitz	Trintəbitz	Gottschee	Malgern	Altlag	
Turkova Draga, Dolenja Turkova Draga	Kočevje	Unterfliegendorf	Shuəchə, Tirknshuəchə, Peatscharə	Gottschee	Mösel	Mösel	Now part of Muha Vas
Turn	Kočevje	Turn, Thurn	Türn	Gottschee	Graflinden	Unterlag	Now part of Knežja Lipa
Verderb, Ferderb	Kočevje	Verderb	Vrderb	Gottschee	Mösel	Mösel	Now part of Podlesje
Vimolj	Semič	Wiederzug, Widerzug	Bidrzug	Rudolfswerth	Tschermoschnitz	Tschermoschnitz	Now part of Srednja Vas
Vrbovec	Kočevje	Tiefental	Tiəfntou, Tiəfntol	Gottschee	Ebental	Ebental	
Vrčice	Semič	Wertschitz, Wertschitsch	Trtschitzə	Möttling	Semitsch	Semitsch	
Zaderc	Kočevje	Saderz	Saderz	Tschernembl	Tscheplach	Unterlag	Now part of Brezovica pri Predgradu
Zajčje Polje	Kočevje	Hasenfeld	Huəshnbold	Gottschee	Schwarzenbach	Gottschee	
Zdihovo	Kočevje	Oberskrill	Öbrschkril	Gottschee	Mösel	Mösel	
Željne	Kočevje	Seele	Sheale	Gottschee	Seele	Gottschee	
Zgornji Pokštajn	Kočevje	Oberpockstein	Öberpöckschtuein	Gottschee	Mösel	Mösel	Now part of Podlesje
Žiben	Kočevje	Oberstein	Schkibm	Gottschee	Altlag	Altlag	Now part of Pugled pri Starem Logu
	Ribnica	Brunn bei Masern		Reifnitz	Masern	Malgern	Only in the 1574 land registry; probably part of Grčarice
	Kočevje	Fliegendorf	Wliəgndoarf	Gottschee	Mösel	Mösel	See: Oberfliegendorf, Unterfliegendorf
	Semič	Friedbüchel		Rudolfswerth	Tschermoschnitz	Tschermoschnitz	Only in the 1574 land registry; probably absorbed into a village near Črmošnjice
	Semič	Fünfzehn Huben	Wemfzein Huabn	Gottschee	Kotschen	Rieg	A collective name for Primoži, Koče, and Mlaka pri Kočevski Reki
	Kočevje	Gnadendorf	Gnoudndoarf, Gnoudndaf	Gottschee	Gottschee	Gottschee	Now part of Kočevje
	Kočevje	Moos bei Kerndorf	Kearndoarf	Gottschee	Mitterdorf	Mitterdorf	Only in the 1574 land registry; probably part of Mlaka pri Kočevju
	Semič	Rechgruben		Rudolfswerth	Tschermoschnitz	Tschermoschnitz	Only in the 1574 land registry
