= Pajkež =

- Location in Slovenia
- Coordinates: 45°42′4.1″N 15°5′52.4″E
- Country: Slovenia
- Traditional region: Lower Carniola
- Statistical region: Southeast Slovenia
- Municipality: Dolenjske Toplice
- Elevation: 520 m (1,710 ft)

Population (2002)
  - Total: 0

Pajkež (pronounced [ˈpaːi̯kɛʃ]; also Zgornja Blaževica, German: Oberblaschowitz) is a former settlement in the Municipality of Dolenjske Toplice in southern Slovenia. The area is part of the traditional region of Lower Carniola and is now included in the Southeast Slovenia Statistical Region. Its territory is now part of the village of Dobindol.

== Name ==
The name Pajkež is believed to derive from the surname Pajek. The alternative Slovene name of the settlement, Zgornja Blaževica, semantically corresponds to the German name Oberblaschowitz, both literally meaning 'upper Blaževica/Blaschowitz'. The epithet 'upper' distinguished the village from neighboring (Spodnja) Blaževica (German: Unterblaschowitz), literally 'lower Blaževica/Blaschowitz'.

== History ==
Pajkež was a Gottschee German village. It was not mentioned in the land registry of 1574 and presumably had not yet been founded by that date. In the cadastral survey carried out under Emperor Francis I from 1818 to 1827, the village had three families living in two houses. It reached its peak of population in 1890, when there were 27 people living in five houses. There was a sharp decrease in the population between 1921 and 1931, when the number of residents fell from 26 to only nine. The village had an exclusively German-speaking population before the Second World War. The population was evicted on 22 December 1941, departing via the train station in Semič. The village was burned by Italian troops in the summer of 1942 during the Rog Offensive and was never rebuilt. A hunting lodge was built at the site of the former village in 1962. In more recent times, archery competitions have been organized at the site.

== Cultural heritage ==
Old maps of the village mark two shrines: one stood 200 m to the north of the settlement, on the road to the hamlet of Pleš in Dobindol, and the other stood 700 m to the southeast, along the road to the hamlet of Seč in Travni Dol. A plantation of 88 trees was planted at the site in 1982 to mark the 88 years of the life of Josip Broz Tito and a commemorative plaque installed. A plaque was also installed on the hunting lodge in 1982, commemorating a Partisan radio station that operated at the site in 1943.
