= Rdeči Kamen =

- Location in Slovenia
- Coordinates: 45°44′24.18″N 14°57′37.10″E
- Country: Slovenia
- Traditional region: Lower Carniola
- Statistical region: Southeast Slovenia
- Municipality: Kočevje
- Elevation: 827.3 m (2,714 ft)

Population (2002)
  - Total: none

Rdeči Kamen (pronounced [əɾˈdeːtʃi ˈkaːmən]; German: Rottenstein) is a remote abandoned former settlement in the Municipality of Kočevje in southern Slovenia. The area is part of the traditional region of Lower Carniola and is now included in the Southeast Slovenia Statistical Region. Its territory is now part of the village of Komolec.

== History ==
Rdeči Kamen was a village inhabited by Gottschee Germans. It had 17 houses before the Second World War. The village was burned by Italian troops on 18 August 1942 during the Rog Offensive and was never rebuilt. The 5th Battalion of the Slovene Partisan companies, named the Lower Carniola Battalion (Slovene: Dolenjski bataljon), was established at Rdeči Kamen.
