= Prežulje =

- Location in Slovenia
- Coordinates: 45°43′53.96″N 14°53′38.43″E
- Country: Slovenia
- Traditional region: Lower Carniola
- Statistical region: Southeast Slovenia
- Municipality: Kočevje
- Elevation: 499 m (1,637 ft)

Population (2002)
  - Total: 0

Prežulje (pronounced [pɾɛˈʒuːljɛ]; also Preža, Preže, or Prežulja; German: Präsuln or Presuln) is a remote abandoned former settlement in the Municipality of Kočevje in southern Slovenia. The area is part of the traditional region of Lower Carniola and is now included in the Southeast Slovenia Statistical Region. Its territory is now part of the village of Gornja Briga.

== History ==
Prežulje was a village inhabited by Gottschee Germans. It was founded in the 16th century and had a farm divided into two half-farms according to the land registry of 1574. Before the Second World War one Slovene family also lived in the village. The village was burned during the war.
