= Kozice, Kočevje =

Kozice
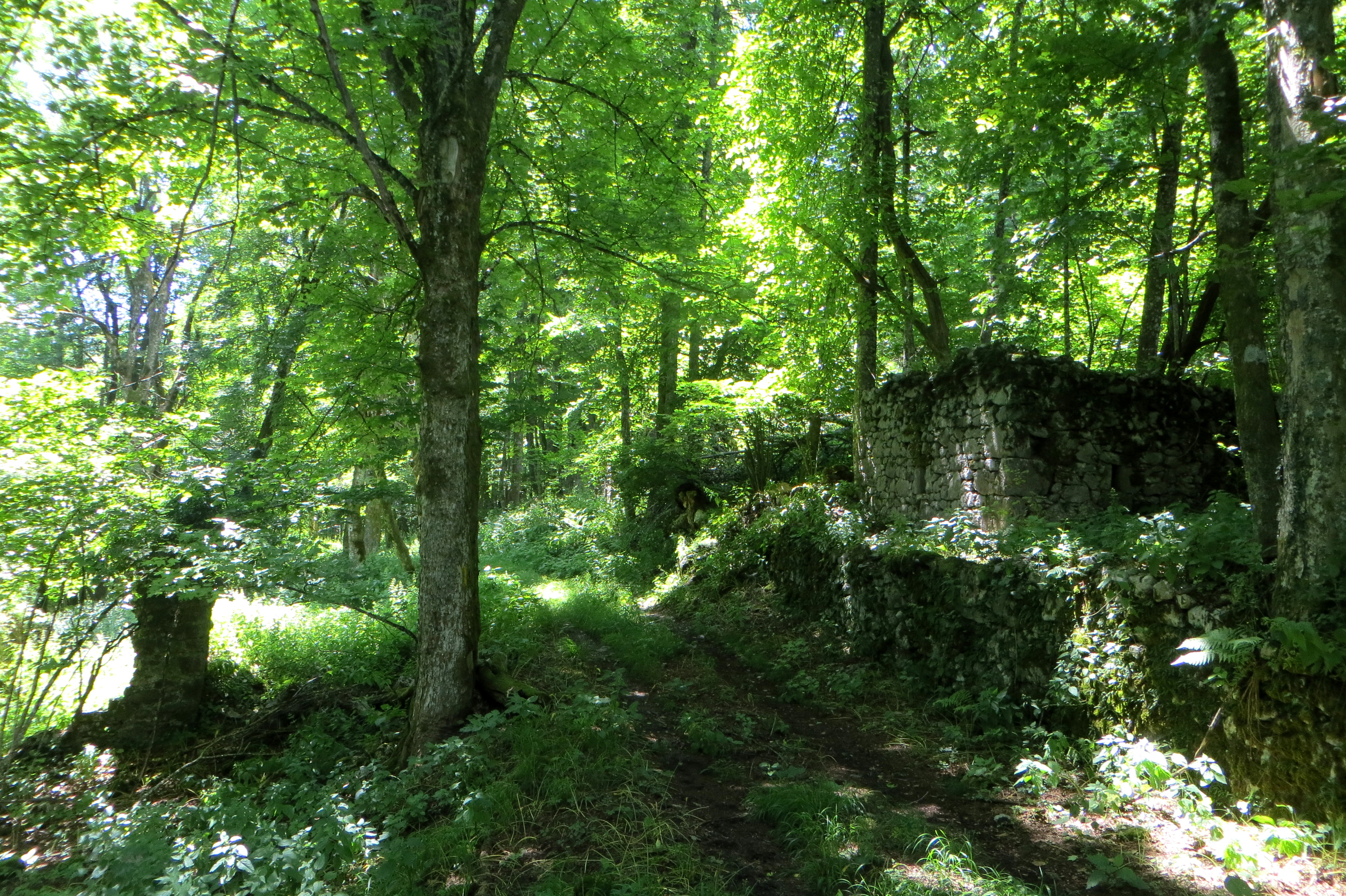

- Location in Slovenia
- Coordinates: 45°30′52.96″N 15°1′28.99″E
- Country: Slovenia
- Traditional region: Lower Carniola
- Statistical region: Southeast Slovenia
- Municipality: Kočevje
- Elevation: 833.9 m (2,736 ft)

Population (2002)
  - Total: 0

Kozice (pronounced [ˈkɔːzitsɛ]; also Parga, German: Kositzen or Kositzenberg, Gottschee German: Afn Pargə) is an abandoned former village in the Municipality of Kočevje in southern Slovenia. The area is part of the traditional region of Lower Carniola and is now included in the Southeast Slovenia Statistical Region. Its territory is now part of the village of Spodnji Log.

== Name ==
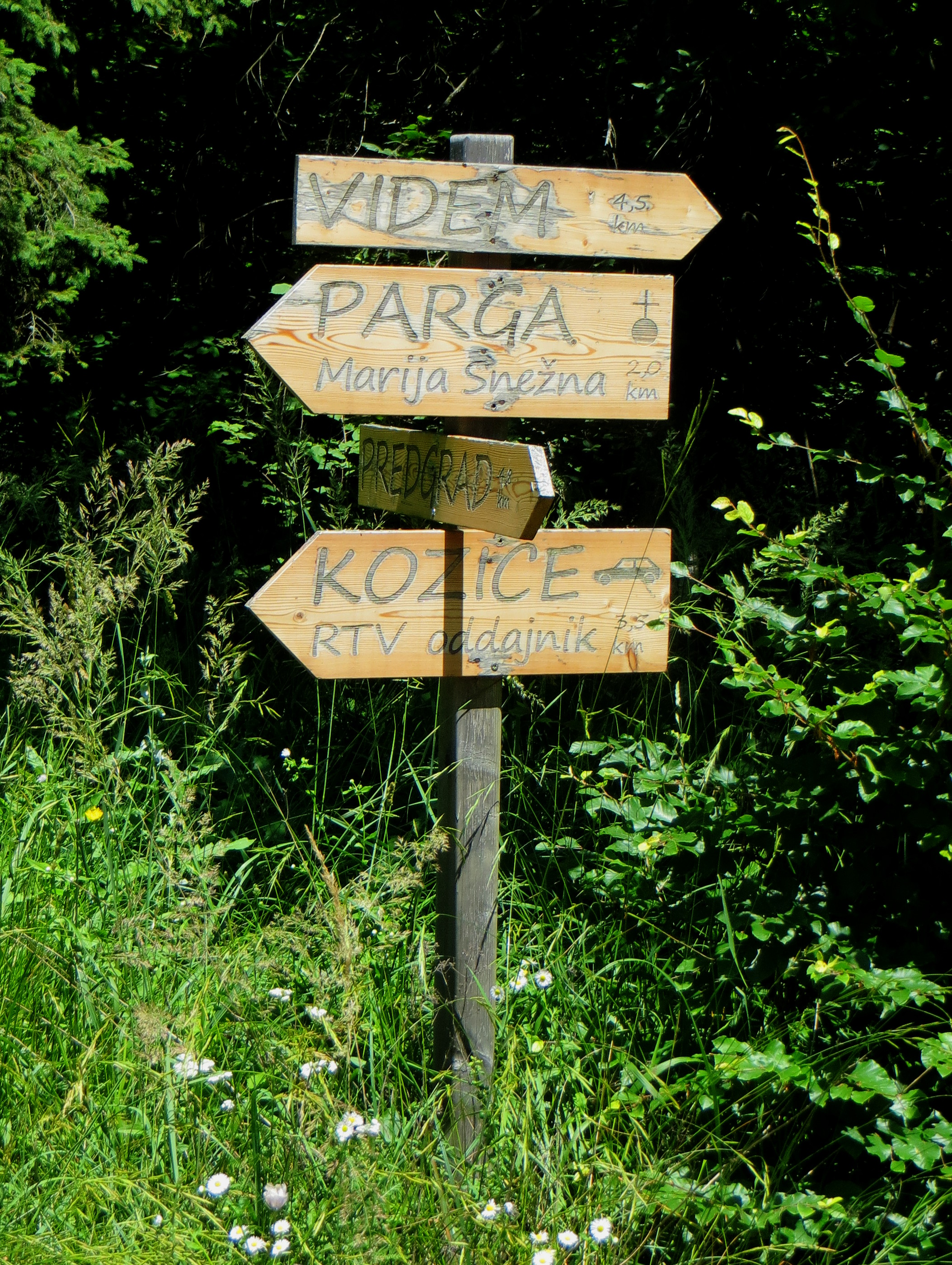
A hiking sign with the name Parga for Kozice

The name Kozice has been explained as referring to Kozice Ridge south of the settlement, imagined to look like a goat (from Slovene koza 'goat'). The alternate Slovene name Parga has been explained as derived from Slovene prga 'that which rakes (up)'. However, compare Gottscheerish parc, parge 'hill, mountain'.

== History ==
Kozice was a Gottschee German village. It was not yet mentioned in the land registry of 1576, but by 1824 it had seven houses, and in 1890 eight houses with a population of 43, all ethnically Slovene. The original Gottschee German inhabitants had gradually moved away. In 1931 it had five houses and eight Slovene residents. The village burned in 1931, after which a farmer named Kalčič built a house and barn at the site. At that point it had not belonged to the ethnic German enclave of Gottschee for a considerable time. The settlement was listed as abandoned in 1937.

== Church ==
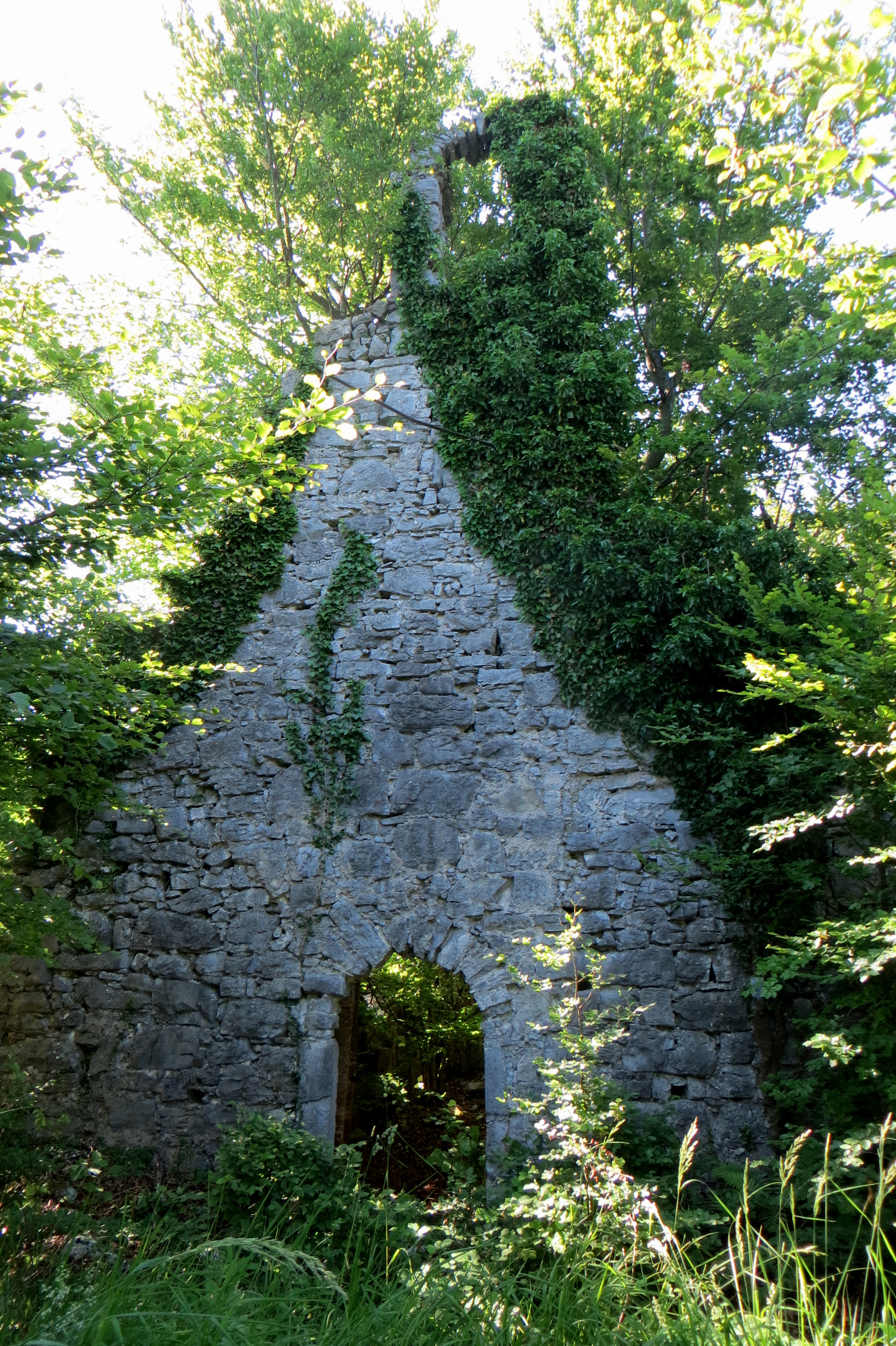
Ruins of Prophet Elijah Church

The ruins of a chapel of ease dedicated to the Prophet Elijah and the Holy Spirit are located in a sparse beech forest above the former village. The building probably predated the mid-17th century. The church was struck by lightning before the Second World War and its roof burned. The church is difficult to reach, and so after the war it was not crushed into road gravel like other churches in the Gottschee region and its stones were not removed for building material.
