= Divji Potok =

- Location in Slovenia
- Coordinates: 45°41′19.87″N 15°5′54.34″E
- Country: Slovenia
- Traditional region: Lower Carniola
- Statistical region: Southeast Slovenia
- Municipality: Dolenjske Toplice
- Elevation: 423.1 m (1,388 ft)

Population (2002)
  - Total: 0

Divji Potok (pronounced [ˈdiːu̯ji ˈpɔːtɔk]; also Vildpoh, German: Oberwildbach or Wildbach) is a former settlement in the Municipality of Dolenjske Toplice in southern Slovenia. The area is part of the traditional region of Lower Carniola and is now included in the Southeast Slovenia Statistical Region. Its territory is now part of the village of Nova Gora.

== History ==
Divji Potok was a Gottschee German village. Before the Second World War it had two houses and 14 residents. The original inhabitants were expelled in the fall of 1941, and the village was burned by Italian troops in the summer of 1942 during the Rog Offensive. The foundations of two sawmills that stood at the site are still visible.
