= Novi Log =

- Location in Slovenia
- Coordinates: 45°44′28.68″N 14°54′11.97″E
- Country: Slovenia
- Traditional region: Lower Carniola
- Statistical region: Southeast Slovenia
- Municipality: Kočevje
- Elevation: 372 m (1,220 ft)

Population (2002)
  - Total: 0

Novi Log (pronounced [ˈnɔːʋi ˈloːk]; locally also Mali Log, German: Neulag) is a remote abandoned former settlement in the Municipality of Kočevje in southern Slovenia. The area is part of the traditional region of Lower Carniola and is now included in the Southeast Slovenia Statistical Region. Its territory is now part of the village of Stari Log.

== History ==
Novi Log was a village inhabited by Gottschee Germans. It had 24 houses before the Second World War. The village was burned by Italian troops during the Rog Offensive in the summer of 1942 and was not rebuilt after the war.
