= Mašelj =

- Location in Slovenia
- Coordinates: 45°40′44.33″N 15°6′41.99″E
- Country: Slovenia
- Traditional region: Lower Carniola
- Statistical region: Southeast Slovenia
- Municipality: Semič

Area
  - Total: 3.54 km^{2} (1.37 sq mi)

Population (2002)
  - Total: 0

Mašelj (pronounced [ˈmaːʃəl]; in older sources also Mašlje, German: Maschel or Maschen) is a small settlement in the Municipality of Semič in Slovenia. The area is part of the historical region of Lower Carniola. The municipality is now included in the Southeast Slovenia Statistical Region. Mašelj is known locally as Graben. The settlement has no permanent residents today.

== History ==
Mašelj was a Gottschee German village. It was not yet mentioned in the Kočevje land registry of 1574 and was probably founded in the 17th century. Before the Second World War it had eight houses, two sawmills, two mills, and an electrical plant that provided power to Mašelj and Črmošnjice. The residents were expelled in December 1941, and five houses were burned in the summer of 1942. After the armistice with Italy the Partisans established a mechanical workshop in one of the houses, and a kitchen and bath in another house. One mill in Mašelj is said to have operated until the end of the war and one sawmill into the 1950s, but today there are only scant remains of these. The site of the village is registered as cultural heritage.
