= Tanči Vrh =

- Location in Slovenia
- Coordinates: 45°34′35.74″N 15°1′6.15″E
- Country: Slovenia
- Traditional region: Lower Carniola
- Statistical region: Southeast Slovenia
- Municipality: Kočevje
- Elevation: 789.6 m (2,591 ft)

Population (2002)
  - Total: 0

Tanči Vrh (pronounced [ˈtaːntʃi ˈʋəɾx]; also Tancbihel or Tanče gorice, German: Tanzbüchel) is a remote abandoned settlement in the Municipality of Kočevje in southern Slovenia. The area is part of the traditional region of Lower Carniola and is now included in the Southeast Slovenia Statistical Region. Its territory is now part of the village of Hrib pri Koprivniku.

== History ==
Tanči Vrh was a Gottschee German village. Before the Second World War it had two houses. All of the houses in the settlement were burned by Italian troops in the summer of 1942 during the Rog Offensive and it was never rebuilt. During the Second World War a reception station was located here for the Partisan hospital at Mount Kumrovo (Slovene: Kumrova gora).
