= Turn, Kočevje =

Turn
- Location in Slovenia
- Coordinates: 45°33′8.63″N 14°59′5.12″E
- Country: Slovenia
- Traditional region: Lower Carniola
- Statistical region: Southeast Slovenia
- Municipality: Kočevje
- Elevation: 547.9 m (1,798 ft)

Population (2002)
  - Total: 0

Turn (pronounced [ˈtuːɾn]; German: Turn or Thurn) is a remote abandoned former settlement in the Municipality of Kočevje in southern Slovenia. The area is part of the traditional region of Lower Carniola and is now included in the Southeast Slovenia Statistical Region. Its territory is now part of the village of Knežja Lipa.

== History ==
Turn was a village inhabited by Gottschee Germans. Before the Second World War, it had four houses. In May 1942, the settlement was burned by Italian troops. It was not rebuilt after the war, and the pastures were incorporated into a collective farm.
