= Ovčjak =

- Location in Slovenia
- Coordinates: 45°35′7.49″N 15°5′40.17″E
- Country: Slovenia
- Traditional region: White Carniola
- Statistical region: Southeast Slovenia
- Municipality: Črnomelj
- Elevation: 688.7 m (2,260 ft)

Population (2002)
  - Total: 0

Ovčjak (pronounced [ɔu̯ˈtʃaːk]; German: Schäflein) is a remote abandoned settlement in the Municipality of Črnomelj in the White Carniola area of southeastern Slovenia. The area is part of the traditional region of Lower Carniola and is now included in the Southeast Slovenia Statistical Region. Its territory is now part of the village of Rožič Vrh.

== History ==
Ovčjak was a Gottschee German village that was settled in the 17th century. Before the Second World War it had 10 houses. The area was burned by Italian troops during the Rog Offensive in the summer of 1942. The former village is registered as a cultural heritage site.

== Notable people ==
Notable people that were born or lived in Ovčjak include:

- Michael Ruppe (1863–1951), sculptor and painter
