= Blaževica =

- Location in Slovenia
- Coordinates: 45°42′23.63″N 15°5′35.42″E
- Country: Slovenia
- Traditional region: Lower Carniola
- Statistical region: Southeast Slovenia
- Municipality: Dolenjske Toplice
- Elevation: 443.7 m (1,456 ft)

Population (2002)
  - Total: 0

Blaževica (pronounced [ˈblaːʒɛʋitsa]; also Blaževič or Spodnja Blaževica, German: Unterblaschowitz) is a former settlement in the Municipality of Dolenjske Toplice in southern Slovenia. The area is part of the traditional region of Lower Carniola and is now included in the Southeast Slovenia Statistical Region. Its territory is now part of the village of Verdun pri Uršnih Selih.

== History ==
Blaževica was a Gottschee German village. In 1931 it had six houses and 25 residents. The original inhabitants were expelled in the fall of 1941. The village was burned by Italian troops in the summer of 1942 during the Rog Offensive and was never rebuilt.
