= Turkova Draga =

- Location in Slovenia
- Coordinates: 45°32′11.45″N 14°55′59.49″E
- Country: Slovenia
- Traditional region: Lower Carniola
- Statistical region: Southeast Slovenia
- Municipality: Kočevje
- Elevation: 555.2 m (1,822 ft)

Population (2002)
  - Total: 0

Turkova Draga (pronounced [ˈtuːɾkɔʋa ˈdɾaːɡa]; in older sources also Dolenja Turkova Draga, German: Unterfliegendorf, Gottscheerish: Shuəchə, Tirknshuəchə, Peatscharə) is an abandoned village in the Municipality of Kočevje in southern Slovenia. The area is part of the traditional region of Lower Carniola and is now included in the Southeast Slovenia Statistical Region. It no longer has any permanent residents. Its territory is now part of the village of Muha Vas.

== History ==
Turkova Draga was a Gottschee German village. It was attacked and laid waste in an Ottoman raid in 1491. Before the Second World War the village had nine houses and a population of 46. Its economy was based on subsistence farming and peddling. There was a mill in the village and a few craftsmen's workshops. It was burned by Italian troops in the summer of 1942 and never restored.
