= Prerigelj =

- Location in Slovenia
- Coordinates: 45°33′11.54″N 15°1′22.51″E
- Country: Slovenia
- Traditional region: Lower Carniola
- Statistical region: Southeast Slovenia
- Municipality: Kočevje
- Elevation: 722.6 m (2,371 ft)

Population (2002)
  - Total: 0

Prerigelj (pronounced [pɾɛˈɾiːɡɛl]; German: Prerigel, Preriegel, or Pröribel) is a remote abandoned former settlement in the Municipality of Kočevje in southern Slovenia. The area is part of the traditional region of Lower Carniola and is now included in the Southeast Slovenia Statistical Region. Its territory is now part of the village of Knežja Lipa.

== History ==
Prerigelj was a village inhabited by Gottschee Germans. Before the Second World War it had 13 houses. In May 1942 the general command of the Partisan Kočevje Battalion met with district and regional functionaries here to prepare plans to take control of the Kočevje region. In June 1942 the settlement was burned by Italian troops. It was not rebuilt after the war.

== Cultural heritage ==
The village church was a chapel of ease dedicated to Saint Andrew. It contained a chalice that had been donated by Austrian field marshal Ernst Gideon von Laudon. The church was demolished after the war and its stones were crushed to make gravel for the roads.
