= Seč, Novo Mesto =

Seč
- Location in Slovenia
- Coordinates: 45°41′38.47″N 15°6′22.03″E
- Country: Slovenia
- Traditional region: Lower Carniola
- Statistical region: Southwest Slovenia
- Municipality: Novo Mesto
- Elevation: 552.9 m (1,814 ft)

Population (2002)
  - Total: none

Seč (pronounced [ˈseːtʃ]; German: Gehag or Gehack (bei Tschermoschnitz), Gottscheerish: Gəhack) is a remote abandoned settlement in the City Municipality of Novo Mesto in southern Slovenia. The area is part of the traditional region of Lower Carniola and is now included in the Southeast Slovenia Statistical Region. Its territory is now part of the village of Travni Dol.

== Name ==
The Slovene name Seč and the German name Gehag, Gehack are semantically identical, referring to cleared land. The Slovene common noun seč means 'logged land, lumbering' as does the German common noun and microtoponym Gehack.

== History ==
Seč was a village inhabited by Gottschee Germans. It was founded relatively late because it was not listed in the Gottschee land registry of 1574 or in the 1770 census. In 1931 it had seven houses and a population of 33. Before the Second World War the economy of the village was based on farming and selling wood, and the villagers also owned some vineyards. The residents were evicted in 1941 and the village was burned by Italian troops in 1942.
