= Šenberk =

- Location in Slovenia
- Coordinates: 45°44′2.37″N 14°55′40.98″E
- Country: Slovenia
- Traditional region: Lower Carniola
- Statistical region: Southeast Slovenia
- Municipality: Kočevje
- Elevation: 418.2 m (1,372 ft)

Population (2002)
  - Total: 0

Šenberk (pronounced [ˈʃeːmbɛɾk]; also Šenberg or Šenperg; German: Schönberg) is a remote abandoned former settlement in the Municipality of Kočevje in southern Slovenia. The area is part of the traditional region of Lower Carniola and is now included in the Southeast Slovenia Statistical Region. Its territory is now part of the village of Stari Log.

== History ==
Šenberk was a village inhabited by Gottschee Germans. It had six houses in 1931. The villagers were known for making barrels and wool coats, and for raising sheep. The village was burned by Italian troops during the Rog Offensive in the summer of 1942 and was not rebuilt after the war.
