= Pogorelec =

- Location in Slovenia
- Coordinates: 45°43′24.32″N 15°1′38.53″E
- Country: Slovenia
- Traditional region: Lower Carniola
- Statistical region: Southeast Slovenia
- Municipality: Dolenjske Toplice
- Elevation: 596.5 m (1,957 ft)

Population (2002)
  - Total: 0

Pogorelec (pronounced [pɔɡɔˈɾeːləts]; German: Pogorelz) is a former settlement in the Municipality of Dolenjske Toplice in southern Slovenia. The area is part of the traditional region of Lower Carniola and is now included in the Southeast Slovenia Statistical Region. Its territory is now part of the village of Podstenice.

== History ==
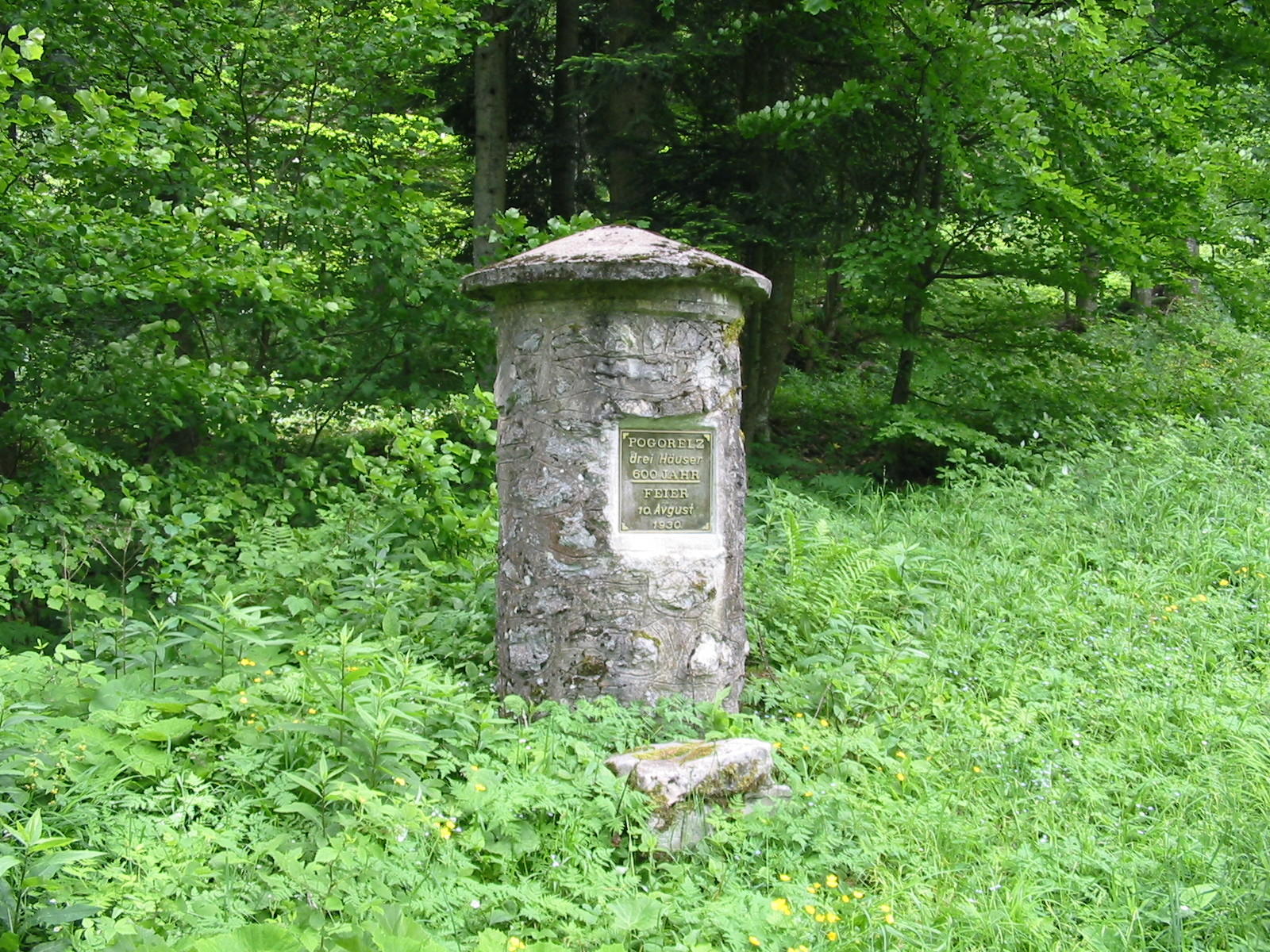
Monument to 600 years of settlement in Pogorelec

Pogorelec was a Gottschee German village. In 1931 the village had five houses and a population of 24. The original inhabitants were expelled in the fall of 1941. Italian troops burned the village in the summer of 1942 during the Rog Offensive. After the war a lodge with a large hay loft belonging to the Podturn Forestry Works was built here, used for part of the year by forestry workers.
