= Cesta pri Starem Logu =

Cesta Cesta pri Starem Logu (1953–1953)
- Location in Slovenia
- Coordinates: 45°42′9.46″N 14°55′35.59″E
- Country: Slovenia
- Traditional region: Lower Carniola
- Statistical region: Southeast Slovenia
- Municipality: Kočevje
- Elevation: 472 m (1,549 ft)

Population (2002)
  - Total: 0

Cesta (pronounced [ˈtseːsta]; also Cesta pri Starem Logu, German: Winkel) is a former settlement in the Municipality of Kočevje in southern Slovenia. The area is part of the traditional region of Lower Carniola and is now included in the Southeast Slovenia Statistical Region. Its territory is now part of the village of Pugled pri Starem Logu.

== Name ==
Cesta was attested in historical sources as Winchler in 1574. The Slovene name Cesta means 'road'. Places with this name in Slovenia lie along roads that predated Slavic settlement in the area. The name of the village was changed from Cesta to Cesta pri Starem Logu in 1953.

== History ==
Cesta was a village inhabited by Gottschee Germans. Before the Second World War it had eight houses. In 1942 a "labor battalion" was stationed here in charge of working the fields, harvesting the crops, and mowing. The village was burned by Italian troops in July 1942 during the Rog Offensive and was never rebuilt. Cesta was presumably deemed annexed by Pugled pri Starem Logu in 1953 because it is not mentioned in later enumerations of settlements in the area (e.g., in 1955 and 1957).
