= Novi Breg =

- Location in Slovenia
- Coordinates: 45°41′7.07″N 14°58′1.16″E
- Country: Slovenia
- Traditional region: Lower Carniola
- Statistical region: Southeast Slovenia
- Municipality: Kočevje
- Elevation: 590 m (1,940 ft)

Population (2002)
  - Total: 0

Novi Breg (pronounced [ˈnɔːʋi ˈbɾeːk]; German: Neubacher) is a remote abandoned settlement in the Municipality of Kočevje in southern Slovenia. The area is part of the traditional region of Lower Carniola and is now included in the Southeast Slovenia Statistical Region. Its territory is now part of the village of Trnovec.

== History ==
Novi Breg was a village inhabited by Gottschee Germans. It had 12 houses before the Second World War. On 12 June 1942 member of the Executive Committee of the Liberation Front, the Central Committee of the Communist Party of Slovenia, and the Partisan Supreme Command met here. There was a large Partisan base on Kamenjak Hill northwest of the settlement, and the Partisan Supreme Command lodged itself in cabins on Royal Rock Hill (Slovene: Kraljevi kamen) to the northeast, where they also built several bunkers for use as warehouses. On 14 August 1942, during the Rog Offensive by Italian forces, the Executive Committee and Central Committee members also withdrew to a bunker on Royal Rock Hill. During this time settlement was burned by Italian troops. They remained there until 23 August, and then went to Podlipoglav and from there to the Polhov Gradec Hills. The settlement was not rebuilt after the war.
