= Seč, Kočevje =

Seč
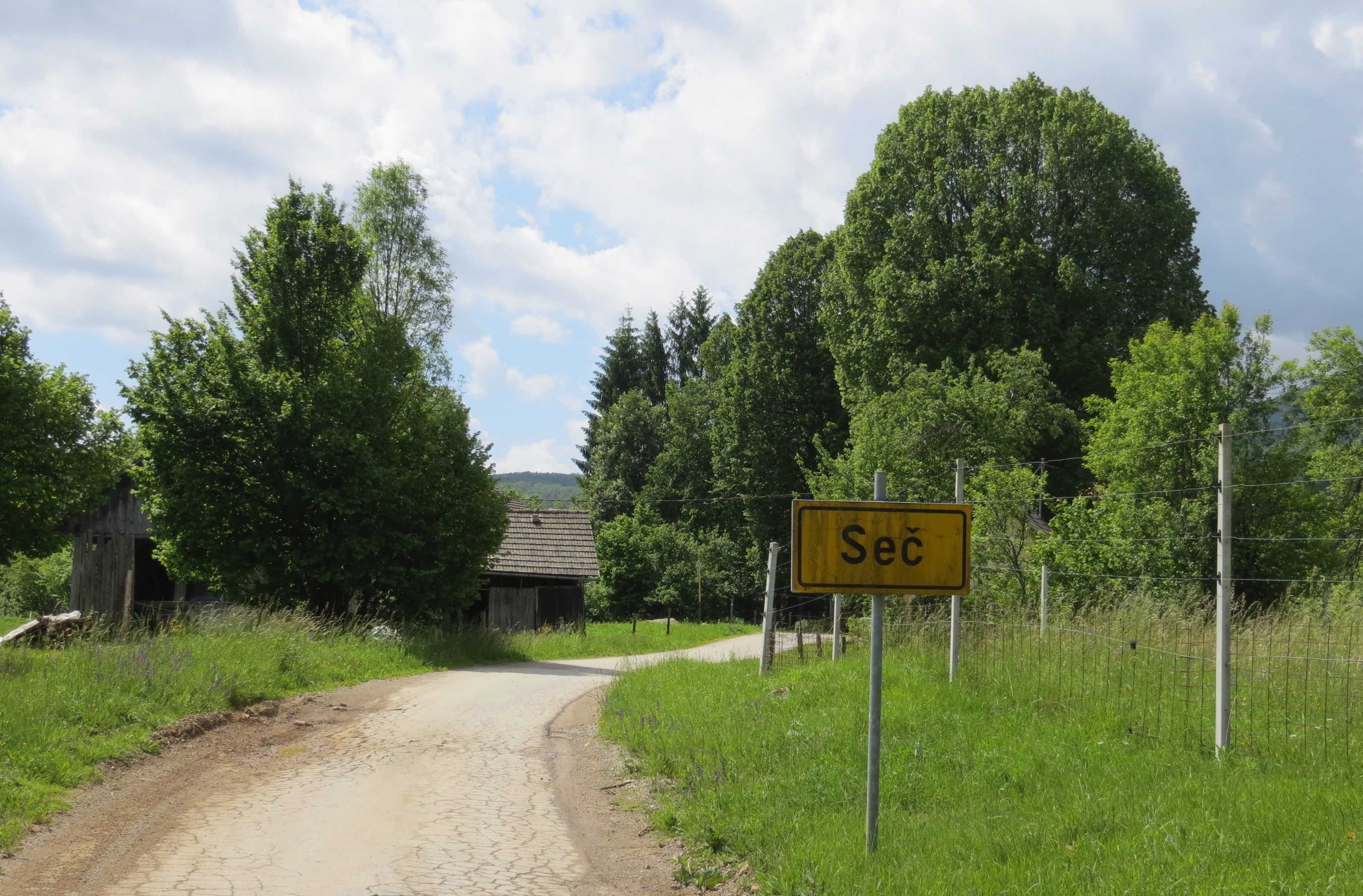

- Location in Slovenia
- Coordinates: 45°45′1.73″N 14°51′4.59″E
- Country: Slovenia
- Traditional region: Lower Carniola
- Statistical region: Southeast Slovenia
- Municipality: Kočevje

Area
  - Total: 4.79 km^{2} (1.85 sq mi)
- Elevation: 375 m (1,230 ft)

Population (2002)
  - Total: 0
- Postal code: 1332

Seč (pronounced [ˈseːtʃ]; German: Setsch) is an abandoned settlement in the Municipality of Kočevje in southern Slovenia. It was a village inhabited by Gottschee Germans. In 1941, during the Second World War its original population was expelled. The area is part of the traditional region of Lower Carniola and is now included in the Southeast Slovenia Statistical Region.

== Church ==
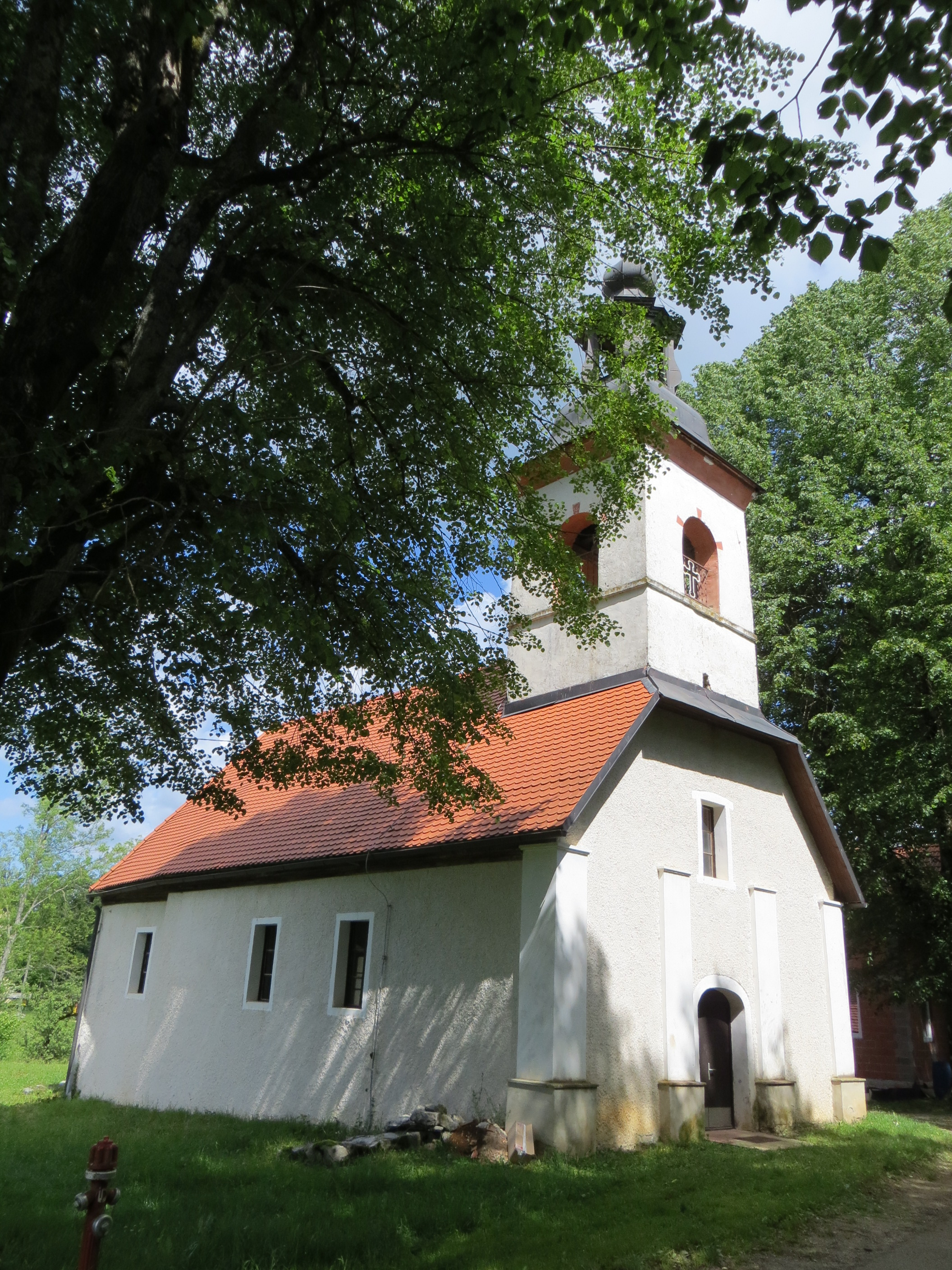
Saint Agnes' Church

The local church is dedicated to Saint Agnes (Slovene: sveta Neža) and was built in 1837. Its interior furnishings were destroyed after the Second World War. It was restored in the early 1980s.
