= Rigelj, Kočevje =

Rigelj
- Location in Slovenia
- Coordinates: 45°41′11.89″N 14°54′48.20″E
- Country: Slovenia
- Traditional region: Lower Carniola
- Statistical region: Southeast Slovenia
- Municipality: Kočevje
- Elevation: 495.9 m (1,627 ft)

Rigelj (pronounced [ˈɾiːɡəl]; also Rigelj na Rogu, German: Riegel) is a remote abandoned settlement in the Municipality of Kočevje in southern Slovenia. The area is part of the traditional region of Lower Carniola and is now included in the Southeast Slovenia Statistical Region. Its territory is now part of the village of Stari Breg.

== History ==
Rigelj was a Gottschee German village. Before the Second World War the settlement had eight houses. Italian troops burned the area in the summer of 1942 during the Rog Offensive and the settlement was not rebuilt.
