= Cvišlerji =

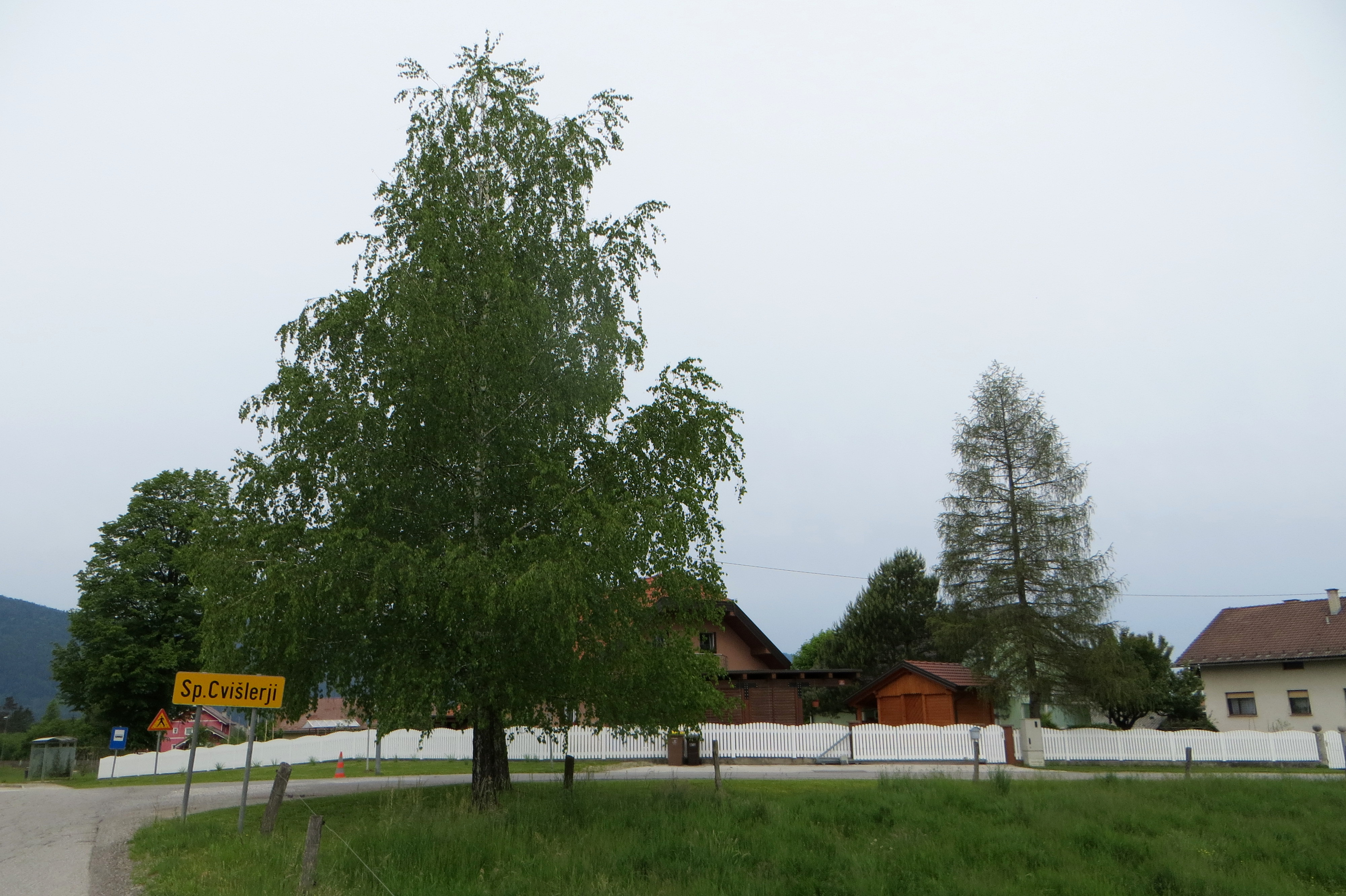

- Location in Slovenia
- Coordinates: 45°38′22.16″N 14°53′38.03″E
- Country: Slovenia
- Traditional region: Lower Carniola
- Statistical region: Southeast Slovenia
- Municipality: Kočevje

Area
  - Total: 6.96 km^{2} (2.69 sq mi)
- Elevation: 478 m (1,568 ft)

Population (2002)
  - Total: 204
- Postal code: 1330

Cvišlerji (pronounced [ˈtsʋiːʃlɛɾji]; in older sources also Cvišljarji, German: Zwischlern, Gottscheerish: Zwishlarə) is a settlement east of Kočevje in southern Slovenia. The area is part of the traditional region of Lower Carniola and is now included in the Southeast Slovenia Statistical Region. The settlement consists of the hamlets of Spodnji Cvišlerji ('lower Cvišlerji'), mostly containing newer houses built after the Second World War, and Zgornji Cvišlerji ('upper Cvišlerji'), containing older houses.

== Name ==
Cvišlerji was recorded in the land registry of 1574 as Zwisslern. The Slovene name Cvišlerji is an adaptation of German Zwischlern, derived from Middle High German zwisele (= Germ. Zwiesel) 'forked tree', referring to a local landscape feature. Another theory claims that it is derived from the surname Zwischler. In addition to standard Slovene Cvišlerji, the local form Cvižlerji is also found.

== History ==
Cvišlerji was a Gottschee German village. In 1575 Charles II, Archduke of Austria issued a decree allowing the town of Kočevje to collect tolls at Cvišlerji because teamsters had been traveling through the village to avoid the town's bridge tax. Before the Second World War there were 42 houses in Cvišlerji, and the residents included nine Slovene families. In the summer of 1942 the village was attacked by Italian troops, who then burned the houses. After the war, the village was primarily settled by Slovenes from Prekmurje. A number of Roma families also live in the settlement today.

== Church ==
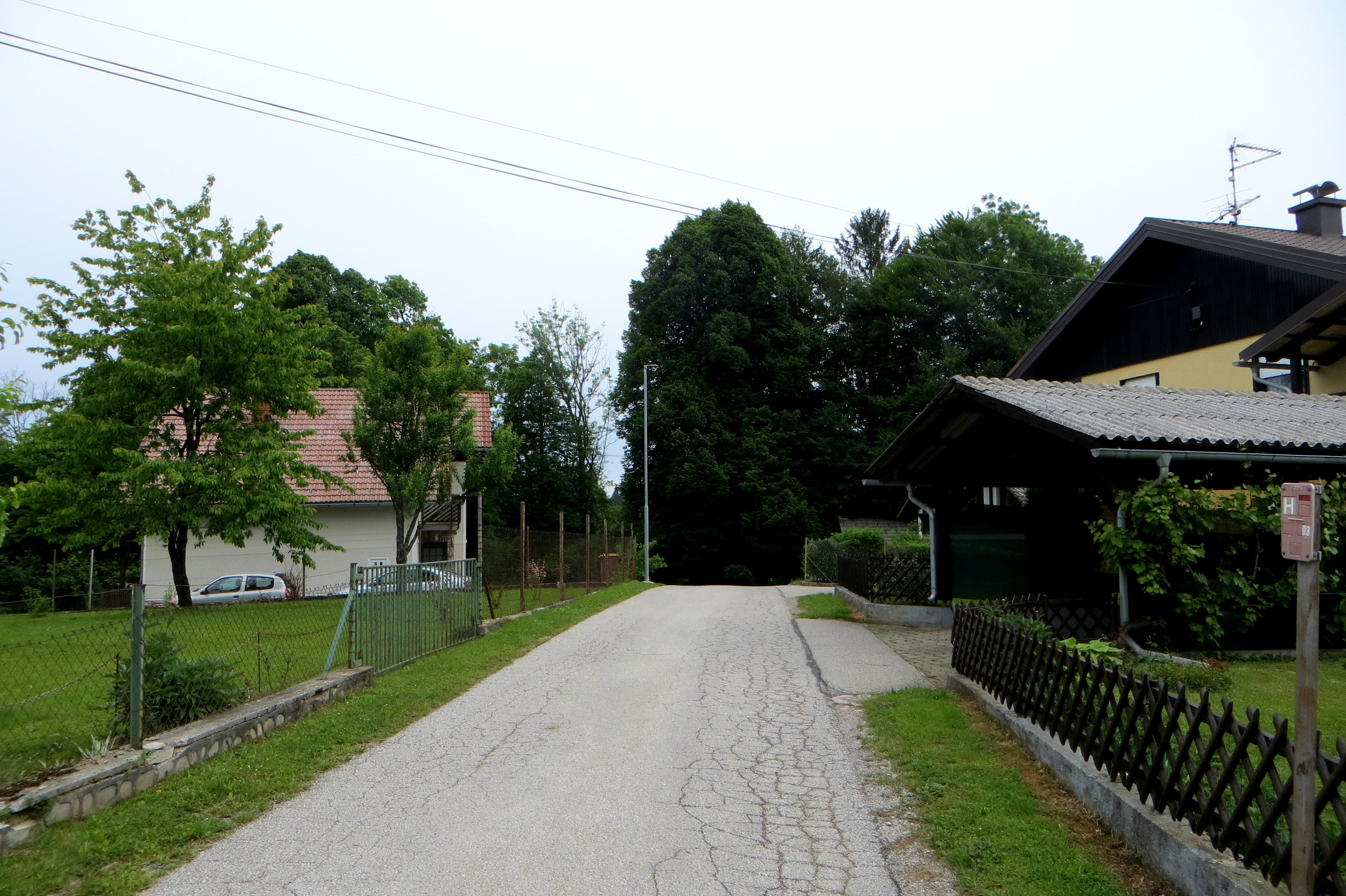
Former site of Saint John the Baptist Church

The local church was burned down during the Second World War in 1942 and demolished in 1947. It was dedicated to John the Baptist and was first mentioned in written documents dating to 1526, although it was probably a 15th-century building.
