= Beli Kamen, Kočevje =

Beli Kamen
- Location in Slovenia
- Coordinates: 45°43′53.96″N 14°53′38.43″E
- Country: Slovenia
- Traditional region: Lower Carniola
- Statistical region: Southeast Slovenia
- Municipality: Kočevje
- Elevation: 499 m (1,637 ft)

Population (2002)
  - Total: 0

Beli Kamen (pronounced [ˈbeːli ˈkaːmən]; German: Weißenstein) is a remote abandoned former settlement in the Municipality of Kočevje in southern Slovenia. The area is part of the traditional region of Lower Carniola and is now included in the Southeast Slovenia Statistical Region. Its territory is now part of the village of Stari Log.

== History ==
Beli Kamen was a village inhabited by Gottschee Germans. It had 23 houses before the Second World War. The village was burned by Italian troops during the Rog Offensive in the second half of August 1942 and was not rebuilt after the war.
