= Pleš, Dolenjske Toplice =

Pleš
- Location in Slovenia
- Coordinates: 45°42′18.03″N 15°6′13.05″E
- Country: Slovenia
- Traditional region: Lower Carniola
- Statistical region: Southeast Slovenia
- Municipality: Dolenjske Toplice
- Elevation: 411.2 m (1,349 ft)

Population (2002)
  - Total: 0

Pleš (pronounced [ˈpleːʃ]; German: Plösch) is a former settlement in the Municipality of Dolenjske Toplice in southern Slovenia. The area is part of the traditional region of Lower Carniola and is now included in the Southeast Slovenia Statistical Region. Its territory is now part of the village of Dobindol.

== Name ==
Like related names (e.g., Plešivec, Plešivica), the name Pleš is derived from the adjective pleš 'bare, barren of vegetation', referring to the local terrain.

== History ==
Pleš was a Gottschee German village. Two houses in the village were burned by Italian troops during the Second World War.
