= Sušje, Črnomelj =

Sušje
- Location in Slovenia
- Coordinates: 45°34′37.57″N 15°4′37.05″E
- Country: Slovenia
- Traditional region: White Carniola
- Statistical region: Southeast Slovenia
- Municipality: Črnomelj
- Elevation: 619.8 m (2,033 ft)

Population (2002)
  - Total: 0

Sušje (pronounced [ˈsuːʃjɛ]; also Draga or Deroh; German: Suchen, Gottscheerish: Därroch) is a remote abandoned settlement in the Municipality of Črnomelj in the White Carniola area of southeastern Slovenia. The area is part of the traditional region of Lower Carniola and is now included in the Southeast Slovenia Statistical Region. Its territory is now part of the village of Rožič Vrh.

== History ==
Sušje was a Gottschee German village. It was abandoned and overgrown before the Second World War.
