= Verderb =

- Location in Slovenia
- Coordinates: 45°32′46.83″N 14°56′48.07″E
- Country: Slovenia
- Traditional region: Lower Carniola
- Statistical region: Southeast Slovenia
- Municipality: Kočevje
- Elevation: 502.8 m (1,650 ft)

Population (2002)
  - Total: 0

Verderb (pronounced [ʋɛɾˈdeːɾp]; also Ferderb, German: Verderb) is a former village in the Municipality of Kočevje in southern Slovenia. The area is part of the traditional region of Lower Carniola and is now included in the Southeast Slovenia Statistical Region. Its territory is now part of the village of Podlesje.

== Name ==
The name of the village, Verderb, is of German origin but its motivation is uncertain. Explanations connect it with the German noun Verderb 'spoilage, deterioration', perhaps referring to a 'forest completely ruined' (i.e., cleared for settlement) or to the complete removal of vegetation for agriculture. The Gottschee German surname Verderber is derived from Verderb, referring to a resident of (or with ancestry from) that village.

== History ==
Verderb was a Gottschee German village. In the Kočevje land registry of 1574, Verderb was listed as a joint settlement with Verdreng with 11 half-farms together. In 1770 Verderb had 10 houses. Before the Second World War the village had six houses. In May 1942 the first Partisan military school was established in the nearby forest. The village was burned by Italian troops in the summer of 1942 during the Rog Offensive and it was never rebuilt.

== Chapel ==
An early 17th-century village chapel was dedicated to the Virgin Mary and stood on Mount Verdreng (Verdrenška gora; also known as Mount Verderb, Verderbška gora) east of the village. It had a Gothic-style chancel and a wooden ceiling in the nave, and the main altar dated from 1891. It was demolished between 1952 and 1955.
