= Sredgora =

- Location in Slovenia
- Coordinates: 45°36′18.11″N 15°5′43.76″E
- Country: Slovenia
- Traditional region: Lower Carniola
- Statistical region: Southeast Slovenia
- Municipality: Semič

Area
  - Total: 2.15 km^{2} (0.83 sq mi)
- Elevation: 695.7 m (2,282 ft)

Sredgora (pronounced [ˈsɾeːdɡɔɾa]; German: Mittenwald, Gottschee German: Mittnbold) is a settlement in the Municipality of Semič in Slovenia. The area is part of the historical region of Lower Carniola. The municipality is now included in the Southeast Slovenia Statistical Region.

== Name ==
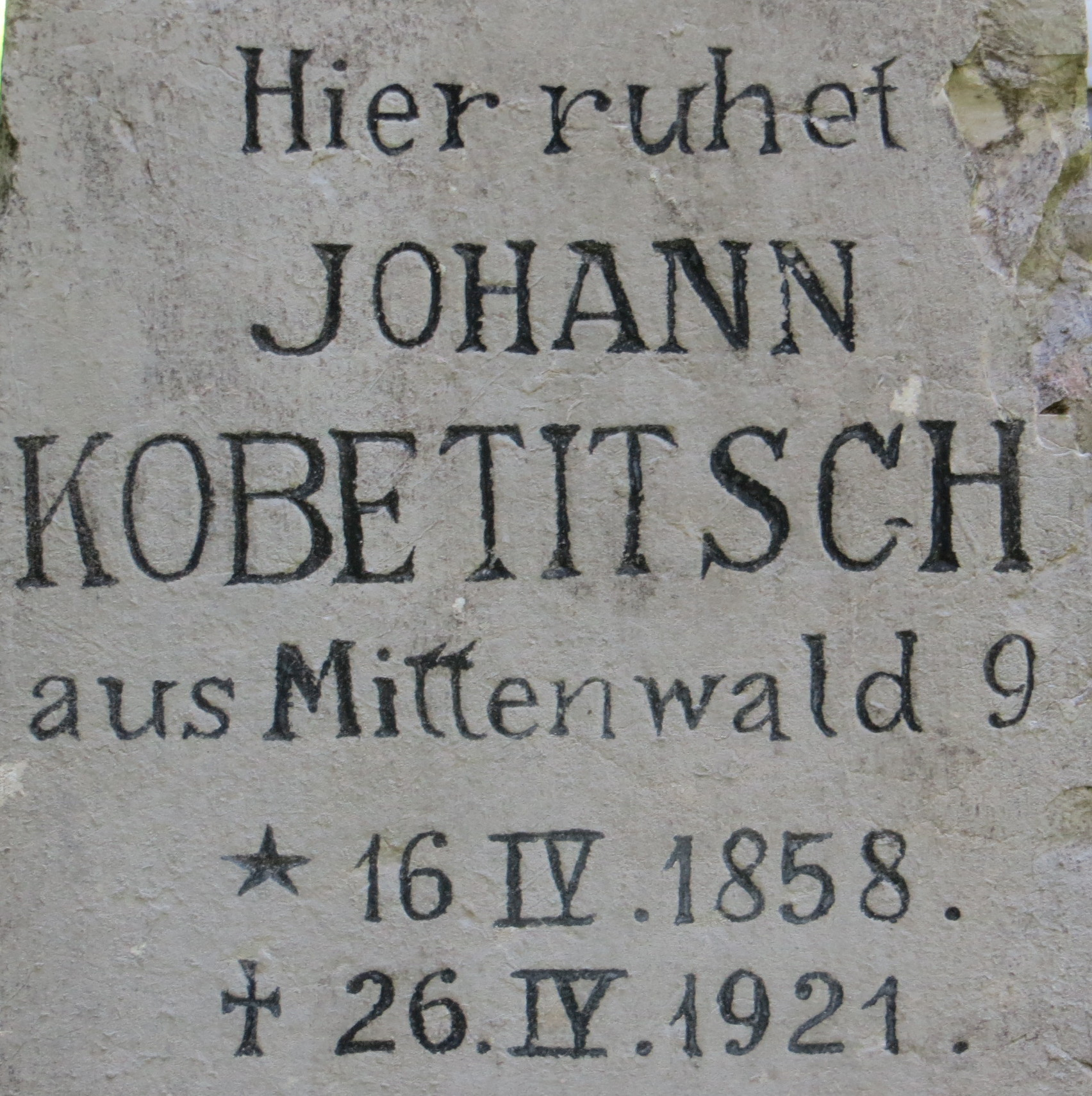
Gottschee German gravestone with the toponym Mittenwald

The name Sredgora is a fused prepositional phrase that has lost case inflection, from sredi 'in the middle of' + gora 'forest'. In Slovene and Slavic in general, the common noun gora refers not only to a mountain, but also to a forest in a hilly or mountainous area. The German name of the village, Mittenwald, semantically corresponds to the Slovene name and is a compound of mitten 'in the middle of' + Wald 'forest'.

== History ==
The village was inhabited by Gottschee Germans that were expelled in 1941 during the Second World War and was burned to the ground in 1944. The local church, now a ruin, was dedicated to Mary Magdalene and belonged to the Parish of Planina.
