= Luža, Kočevje =

Luža
- Location in Slovenia
- Coordinates: 45°44′35.28″N 14°57′3.70″E
- Country: Slovenia
- Traditional region: Lower Carniola
- Statistical region: Southeast Slovenia
- Municipality: Kočevje
- Elevation: 808.2 m (2,652 ft)

Population (2002)
  - Total: none

Luža (pronounced [ˈluːʒa]; German: Lacknern or Laknern) is a remote abandoned former settlement in the Municipality of Kočevje in southern Slovenia. The area is part of the traditional region of Lower Carniola and is now included in the Southeast Slovenia Statistical Region. Its territory is now part of the village of Komolec.

== Name ==
The Slovene name Luža is believed to derive from the Slovene common noun luža 'pond, pool, puddle', referring to a local geographical feature. The German name Lacknern is believed to be of similar origin (cf. German Lache 'pool, puddle'). Other explanations connect the German name with Lackner 'settler' or with the surname Lackner.

== History ==
Luža was a village inhabited by Gottschee Germans. It was recorded in the land registry of 1574 as having one full farm divided into two half-farms, and a population between seven and 10. In 1869 and 1880 the village had two houses and a population of 21 and 22, respectively. The village was abandoned by the beginning of the 20th century.

A logger's cabin remained at the site, but it was burned by Italian troops during the Rog Offensive in the summer of 1942. The cabin was rebuilt after the war.
