= Gorenji Mačkovec =

- Location in Slovenia
- Coordinates: 45°36′50.84″N 14°59′2.6″E
- Country: Slovenia
- Traditional region: Lower Carniola
- Statistical region: Southeast Slovenia
- Municipality: Kočevje
- Elevation: 810 m (2,660 ft)

Population (2002)
  - Total: 0

Gorenji Mačkovec (pronounced [ɡɔˈɾeːnji ˈmaːtʃkɔʋəts]; German: Oberkatzendorf) is a remote abandoned former settlement in the Municipality of Kočevje in southern Slovenia. The area is part of the traditional region of Lower Carniola and is now included in the Southeast Slovenia Statistical Region. Its territory is now part of the village of Laze pri Oneku.

== History ==
Gorenji Mačkovec was a village inhabited by Gottschee Germans. It had two houses before the Second World War. The village was burned by Italian troops during the Rog Offensive in August 1942 and was not rebuilt after the war.
