= Ramsrigelj =

- Location in Slovenia
- Coordinates: 45°32′58.32″N 14°59′16.11″E
- Country: Slovenia
- Traditional region: Lower Carniola
- Statistical region: Southeast Slovenia
- Municipality: Kočevje
- Elevation: 547.2 m (1,795 ft)

Population (2002)
  - Total: 0

Ramsrigelj (pronounced [ˈɾaːmsɾiɡɛl]; German: Ramsriegel) is a remote abandoned former settlement in the Municipality of Kočevje in southern Slovenia. The area is part of the traditional region of Lower Carniola and is now included in the Southeast Slovenia Statistical Region. Its territory is now part of the village of Knežja Lipa.

== History ==
Ramsrigelj was a village inhabited by Gottschee Germans. Before the Second World War it had five houses. In May 1942 the settlement was burned by Italian troops. It was not rebuilt after the war, and the pastures were incorporated into a collective farm.
