= Žiben =

- Location in Slovenia
- Coordinates: 45°42′15.86″N 14°56′18.63″E
- Country: Slovenia
- Traditional region: Lower Carniola
- Statistical region: Southeast Slovenia
- Municipality: Kočevje
- Elevation: 655 m (2,149 ft)

Population (2002)
  - Total: 0

Žiben (pronounced [ˈʒiːbən]; sometimes Žibenj, German: Oberstein) is a remote abandoned settlement in the Municipality of Kočevje in southern Slovenia. The area is part of the traditional region of Lower Carniola and is now included in the Southeast Slovenia Statistical Region. Its territory is now part of the village of Pugled pri Starem Logu.

== History ==
Žiben was a village inhabited by Gottschee Germans. It was burned by Italian troops during the Rog Offensive in the summer of 1942. A hayrack still stood at the site when a meeting of Liberation Front activists was held here from 28 to 30 April 1943. After this the Italian troops burned the hayrack as well. A monument was erected at the site commemorating the wartime events and next to the monument are the graves of three Partisan soldiers. The wounded soldiers had fled from the Partisan hospital at Stari Breg when it came under German bombardment in October 1943, and they were apprehended and executed at Žiben.
