= Konjski Hrib =

- Location in Slovenia
- Coordinates: 45°37′1.11″N 15°7′40.00″E
- Country: Slovenia
- Traditional region: Lower Carniola
- Statistical region: Southeast Slovenia
- Municipality: Semič
- Elevation: 626.3 m (2,055 ft)

Population (2002)
  - Total: 0

Konjski Hrib (pronounced [ˈkɔːnski ˈxɾiːp]; German: Roßbüchel) is a remote abandoned settlement in the Municipality of Semič in southern Slovenia. The area is part of the traditional region of Lower Carniola and is now included in the Southeast Slovenia Statistical Region. Its territory is now part of the village of Planina.

== History ==
Konjski Hrib was a Gottschee German village. It had four houses in 1931. The original inhabitants were expelled from the village in the fall of 1941. It was burned by Italian troops in the summer of 1942 during the Rog Offensive and was never rebuilt.
