= Smrečnik =

- Location in Slovenia
- Coordinates: 45°40′23.29″N 15°3′49.47″E
- Country: Slovenia
- Traditional region: Lower Carniola
- Statistical region: Southeast Slovenia
- Municipality: Semič
- Elevation: 684 m (2,244 ft)

Population (2002)
  - Total: none

Smrečnik (pronounced [ˈsmɾeːtʃnik]; also archaic Smrečnjek, German: Feichtbüchel, Gottscheerish: Waichtpiechl) is a remote abandoned settlement in the Municipality of Semič in southern Slovenia. The area is part of the traditional region of Lower Carniola and is now included in the Southeast Slovenia Statistical Region. Its territory is now part of the village of Komarna Vas.

== Name ==
Smrečnik lies on a rise in a spruce forest on the road from Komarna Vas. Its various names refer to the local vegetation (cf. German Fichte 'spruce', Slovene smreka 'spruce'); the German and Gottscheerish names literally mean 'spruce hill'.

== History ==
Smrečnik was a Gottschee German village. founded after 1558 and it had three houses during the entire time it existed. In the land registry of 1574 it consisted of three-fourths of a full farm divided into three quarter-farms and corresponding to a population between eight and eleven. Before the Second World War it had a population of 11. The population worked as manual laborers and carpenters, had a few vineyards, and also produced bushel baskets. The original inhabitants were evicted in the fall of 1941. The village was burned by Italian troops during the Rog Offensive of summer 1942 and was never rebuilt.
