= Resa, Semič =

Resa
- Location in Slovenia
- Coordinates: 45°39′18.66″N 15°2′21.52″E
- Country: Slovenia
- Traditional region: Lower Carniola
- Statistical region: Southeast Slovenia
- Municipality: Semič
- Elevation: 785.1 m (2,576 ft)

Population (2002)
  - Total: 0

Resa (pronounced [ˈɾeːsa]; German: Ressen) is a remote abandoned settlement in the Municipality of Semič in southern Slovenia. The area is part of the traditional region of Lower Carniola and is now included in the Southeast Slovenia Statistical Region. Its territory is now part of the village of Komarna Vas.

== History ==
Resa was a Gottschee German village. It was founded after 1558 and initially consisted of two half-farms. In 1770 it had four houses, and in 1931 three houses. The original inhabitants were expelled in the fall of 1941. The village was burned by Italian troops in the summer of 1942 during the Rog Offensive and it was never rebuilt.
