= Gorenja Loka =

- Location in Slovenia
- Coordinates: 45°34′18.64″N 15°2′40.65″E
- Country: Slovenia
- Traditional region: Lower Carniola
- Statistical region: Southeast Slovenia
- Municipality: Kočevje
- Elevation: 602.2 m (1,976 ft)

Population (2002)
  - Total: 0

Gorenja Loka (pronounced [ɡɔˈɾeːnja ˈloːka]; also Gorenja Nemška Loka, German: Oberdeutschau) is a remote abandoned settlement in the Municipality of Kočevje in southern Slovenia. The area is part of the traditional region of Lower Carniola and is now included in the Southeast Slovenia Statistical Region. Its territory is now part of the village of Hrib pri Koprivniku.

== History ==
Gorenja Loka was a Gottschee German village. It was founded in the 14th century. Before the Second World War it had six houses. All of the houses in the settlement were burned by Italian troops in the summer of 1942 during the Rog Offensive and it was never rebuilt. The site of the former village is registered as cultural heritage.
