= Svetli Potok =

- Location in Slovenia
- Coordinates: 45°34′25.53″N 15°0′19.76″E
- Country: Slovenia
- Traditional region: Lower Carniola
- Statistical region: Southeast Slovenia
- Municipality: Kočevje

Area
  - Total: 9.54 km^{2} (3.68 sq mi)

Population (2012)
  - Total: 0

Svetli Potok (pronounced [ˈsʋɛːtli ˈpɔːtɔk]; in older sources also Svetlji Potok, German: Lichtenbach, Gottscheerish: Liəmpoch) is a village in the Municipality of Kočevje in southern Slovenia. The area is part of the traditional region of Lower Carniola and is now included in the Southeast Slovenia Statistical Region. It no longer has any permanent residents.

== Name ==
The Slovene name Svetli Potok and the German name Lichtenbach literally mean 'bright/light creek'. According to August Tschinkel, the name is connected with Liembach (?) in Lower Styria. Eberhard Kranzmayer derived the name from Lindenbach or Lindbach (literally, 'linden creek').

== History ==
Svetli Potok was a Gottschee German village. In the Kočevje land registry of 1574 it had four full farms divided into eight half-farms and five tenant farmers and 13 landowners, corresponding to a population between 40 and 45. The village had 17 houses in the 1770 census. From 1843 to 1900 several workshops operated here producing wool coats and employing approximately 80 people. The products were sold in Črnomelj, Metlika, Ogulin, Vrbovsko, Karlovac, and Zagreb. One such workshop was still producing coats before the Second World War and large numbers of sheep were raised in the area for this purpose. The first schoolteacher in the village was the heritage researcher Josef Perz, who taught from 1885 to 1895. Before the Second World War, Lichtenbach had 17 houses. The village was burned in August 1942 by Italian troops during the Rog Offensive.

== Church ==
The church in the village was dedicated to the Virgin Mary and dated from 1626 or 1656. It had three altars until 1941, but the two side altars dating to 1765 were then removed. The main altar was made of marble and gilded. The church was once a well-known pilgrimage destination and was decorated by the painter Pietro Sopracase from Udine.

A chapel-shrine stood in the center of the village. The shrine had a 15-kilogram (33 lb) bell bearing the date 1635; the bell was removed in 1917.

== Notable people ==
Notable people that were born or lived in Svetli Potok include:

- Ferdinand Jonke (1873–1906), religious writer and parish priest at Santa Croce di Trieste
- Josef Perz (1866 – after 1942), teacher, folk song collector, and heritage researcher
- Johann Tschinkel (a.k.a. Hans Tschinkel, Ivan Tschinkel) (1872–1925), grammarian and author of a Gottschee German grammar
- Wilhelm Tschinkel (1875–1938), ethnographer
