= Travnik, Semič =

Travnik
- Location in Slovenia
- Coordinates: 45°38′51.04″N 15°2′41.98″E
- Country: Slovenia
- Traditional region: Lower Carniola
- Statistical region: Southeast Slovenia
- Municipality: Semič
- Elevation: 844.6 m (2,771 ft)

Population (2002)
  - Total: 0

Travnik (pronounced [ˈtɾaːu̯nik]; German: Scherenbrunn, sometimes Grossberg) is a remote abandoned settlement in the Municipality of Semič in southern Slovenia. The area is part of the traditional region of Lower Carniola and is now included in the Southeast Slovenia Statistical Region. Its territory is now part of the village of Komarna Vas.

== History ==
Travnik was a Gottschee German village. It was founded after 1558 and initially consisted of one half-farm and two quarter-farms. Before the Second World War there was a hunting and forestry watchman's house here as well as a hunter's blind with a bait area for bears. The village was burned by Italian troops in the summer of 1942 during the Rog Offensive and it was never rebuilt.
