= Medvedjek, Loški Potok =

Medvedjek
- Location in Slovenia
- Coordinates: 45°36′22.8″N 14°42′15.49″E
- Country: Slovenia
- Traditional region: Lower Carniola
- Statistical region: Southeast Slovenia
- Municipality: Loški Potok
- Elevation: 958 m (3,143 ft)

Medvedjek (pronounced [mɛˈdʋeːdjɛk]; German: Bärenheim or Bärnheim) is a former village in the Municipality of Loški Potok in southern Slovenia. The area is part of the traditional region of Lower Carniola and is now included in the Southeast Slovenia Statistical Region. Its territory is now part of the village of Trava.

== Name ==
The name Medvedjek and names like it (e.g., Medvedjek, Medvedce, Gorenje Medvedje Selo) is relatively common in Slovenia as a toponym, microtoponym, and oronym. The name Medvedjek was originally *Medvedjak (< *Medvědьjakъ), derived from the personal name Medved, which is still a Slovene surname. The surname Medved is based on the identical common noun medved 'bear'. The German name Bärenheim, literally 'bear's home', is semantically similar.

== History ==
Medvedjek was an independent settlement before the Second World War. A sawmill operated in the settlement. In 1890 it had a population of 107. In 1971 the settlement consisted of only two houses, one housing a state hunting official and another housing a forestry worker and his family.
