= Topli Vrh, Semič =

Topli Vrh
- Location in Slovenia
- Coordinates: 45°41′9.45″N 15°5′8.35″E
- Country: Slovenia
- Traditional region: Lower Carniola
- Statistical region: Southeast Slovenia
- Municipality: Semič
- Elevation: 609.8 m (2,001 ft)

Population (2002)
  - Total: none

Topli Vrh (pronounced [ˈtɔːpli ˈʋəɾx]; also Topli Vrh pri Črmošnjicah, German: Untertap(pe)lwerch) is an abandoned settlement in the Municipality of Semič in southern Slovenia. The area is part of the traditional region of Lower Carniola and is now included in the Southeast Slovenia Statistical Region. Its territory is now part of the village of Črmošnjice.

== History ==
Topli Vrh was a village inhabited by Gottschee Germans. In 1574 it consisted of six half-farms. In 1770 it had 15 houses, and in 1931 it had 25. The original inhabitants were evicted in the fall of 1941. Italian troops burned the village during the Rog Offensive in the summer of 1942 and it was never rebuilt.

== Church ==
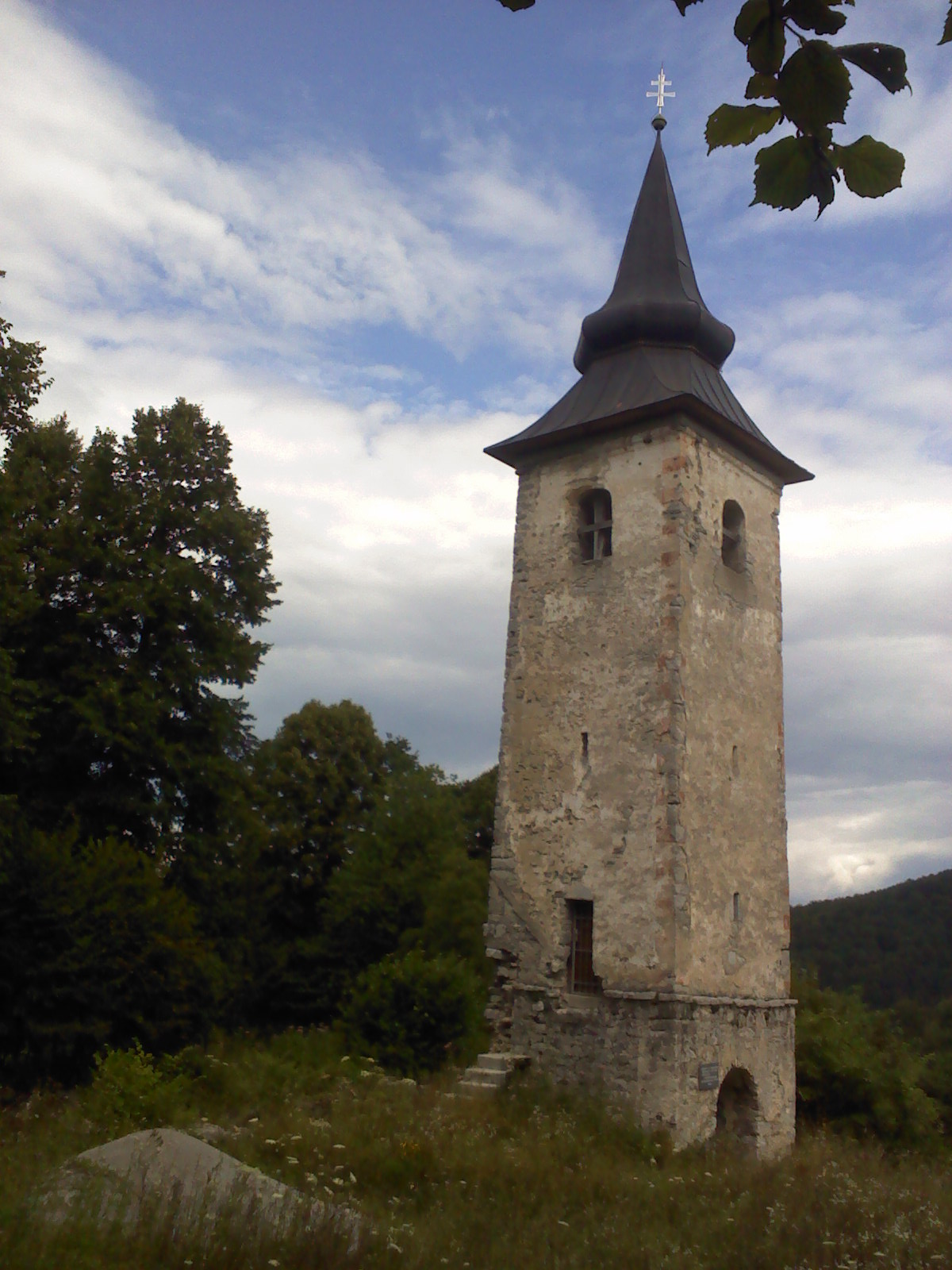
Belfry of Sts. Peter and Paul Church

The church in the village was a chapel of ease dedicated to Saints Peter and Paul. It had a rectangular nave and an octagonal chancel walled on three sides. A square belfry stood against the south wall of the building. The church was first mentioned in written sources in 1689 by Johann Weikhard von Valvasor, who referred to it as the Church of "S. Pauli zu Toplaverch." The church was probably built in the 17th century, but architectural features indicate that it may date from a century earlier. The church had a simple stone door casing and small rectangular windows, with quoined corners and decorative painting. The belfry also featured quoining. The nave and the chancel were covered with a tiled gabled roof. The church fell into ruin after the departure of the Gottchee Germans, and the local people removed much of the material, leaving only the belfry, whose roof was repaired in 2004.
