= Muha Vas =

- Location in Slovenia
- Coordinates: 45°32′13.92″N 14°55′27.50″E
- Country: Slovenia
- Traditional region: Lower Carniola
- Statistical region: Southeast Slovenia
- Municipality: Kočevje

Area
  - Total: 3.35 km^{2} (1.29 sq mi)

Population (2002)
  - Total: 0

Muha Vas (pronounced [ˈmuːxa ˈʋaːs]; Slovene: Muha vas, in older sources also Gorenja Turkova Draga; German: Oberfliegendorf; Gottscheerish: Wliəgndoarf) is a village in the Municipality of Kočevje in southern Slovenia. The area is part of the traditional region of Lower Carniola and is now included in the Southeast Slovenia Statistical Region. It no longer has any permanent residents.

== History ==
Muha Vas was a Gottschee German village. It was attacked and laid waste in an Ottoman raid in 1491. According to the 1574 land registry, it had two full farms (each divided into half farms) and two tenant farmers. Due to their small farms and exposure to the danger of Ottoman raids, the farmers paid a low tax and performed corvée only one day per year. The settlement had 11 houses in 1770, but only seven in 1825. The peak population of the village was 60 in 1880, but by 1910 this had declined to 36. In 1936, the village had nine houses and 46 residents (10 German, 8 Slovene, and 28 ethnically mixed). At that time, the economy of the village was based on subsistence agriculture and peddling. Schooling was offered in nearby Podlesje. The German inhabitants were evicted during the Second World War, on 18 December 1941.

After the war, six of the nine houses in the village were still in usable condition, and there was a population of 15. The population had declined to nine people in four houses by 1948. In 1961, only one house remained in the village, and, by 1971, it was vacant and deteriorating.
