= Rampoha =

- Location in Slovenia
- Coordinates: 45°41′53.02″N 15°3′42.50″E
- Country: Slovenia
- Traditional region: Lower Carniola
- Statistical region: Southeast Slovenia
- Municipality: Dolenjske Toplice
- Elevation: 491.8 m (1,614 ft)

Population (2002)
  - Total: none

Rampoha (pronounced [ˈɾaːmpɔxa]; in older sources also Drampah, German: Dranbank, Gottscheerish: Dranponk) is a remote abandoned settlement in the Municipality of Dolenjske Toplice in southern Slovenia. The area is part of the traditional region of Lower Carniola and is now included in the Southeast Slovenia Statistical Region. Its territory is now part of the village of Občice.

== Name ==
The Slovenian name Rampoha is derived from the German name Dranbank, which means 'grassy meadow'. However, the German name may be a Slovene-German compound of Dran- (< Sln. traven 'grassy') + Bank, Bang 'forest meadow'; cf. Germ. Grasbank and Rasenbank 'grassy ridge of ground'.

== History ==
Rampoha was a Gottschee German village founded after 1574 (when it does not yet appear in the land registry). A farmer named Pachinger is recorded as living in the settlement in 1750. In 1931 the village had four houses and a population of 27. In 1933 the population was 15. The village economy was largely based on carpentry and selling wood in Straža. The inhabitants were evicted in the fall of 1941. During the Rog Offensive in the summer of 1942, Italian forces burned the village and it was never rebuilt.
