= Starološki Grič =

- Location in Slovenia
- Coordinates: 45°37′5.52″N 15°3′38.88″E
- Country: Slovenia
- Traditional region: Lower Carniola
- Statistical region: Southeast Slovenia
- Municipality: Semič

Population (2002)
  - Total: 0

Starološki Grič (pronounced [staɾɔˈloːʃki ˈɡɾiːtʃ]; German: Altlagbüchel, Gottscheerish: Autlogpichl or Lockpiechl) is a remote abandoned settlement in the Municipality of Semič in southern Slovenia. The area is part of the traditional region of Lower Carniola and is now included in the Southeast Slovenia Statistical Region. Its territory is now part of the village of Planina.

== Name ==
The name of the village is also recorded as Lackh Püchel and Logbichl in old land registries, and was known as Autlogpichl, Lockpiechl, or Logpichl in the Gottschee German dialect. The designation Staro-/Alt- 'old' distinguished the settlement from the nearby younger settlement of Novološki Grič (German: Neu-Lagbüchel). Both the Slovene name and German names literally mean '(old) hill near a marshy meadow'. Slovene place names containing the word grič 'small hill' are relatively common and may historically refer to elevations rising over 100 meters.

== History ==
The land registries of 1574 and 1770 indicate that Starološki Grič consisted of one hide and four houses, with a population of six landowners and 12 to 15 residents altogether. In 1817 the village still had four houses and its population was 26. The village was abandoned by the end of the 19th century due to emigration to the United States. It was sold off to the Auersperg noble family in the 1890s to provide housing for their forestry workers. The abandoned village burned before the First World War.

== Cultural heritage ==
The entire former village site is registered as cultural heritage, including ruins of buildings, a well, outlines of overgrown fields, and the remains of a linden-tree avenue. The ruins of the village's 16th-century Saint Ulrich's Chapel are also registered as cultural heritage. This was a single-nave building with a narrow single-bay octagonal chancel walled on five sides. The remnants of a carved travertine arch and a narrow window in the chancel show that the chapel was built in the Gothic style.
