= Ribnik, Semič =

Ribnik
- Location in Slovenia
- Coordinates: 45°39′21.06″N 15°3′6.24″E
- Country: Slovenia
- Traditional region: Lower Carniola
- Statistical region: Southeast Slovenia
- Municipality: Semič
- Elevation: 665.9 m (2,185 ft)

Population (2002)
  - Total: 0

Ribnik (pronounced [ˈɾiːbnik]; German: Ribnik) is a remote abandoned settlement in the Municipality of Semič in southern Slovenia.

== Overview ==
The area is part of the traditional region of Lower Carniola and is now included in the Southeast Slovenia Statistical Region. Its territory is now part of the village of Komarna Vas.

== History ==
Ribnik was a Gottschee German village. It was named after two ponds (from Slovene ribnik 'pond') in the village owned by the Dominion of Kočevje. In 1574 the village consisted of four half-farms. In 1770 it had 10 houses, and 11 houses in 1931. A steam-powered sawmill operated in the village before the Second World War. The original inhabitants were expelled in the fall of 1941. The village was burned by Italian troops in the summer of 1942 during the Rog Offensive and it was never rebuilt.
