= Gričice =

- Location in Slovenia
- Coordinates: 45°39′49.44″N 15°5′11.09″E
- Country: Slovenia
- Traditional region: Lower Carniola
- Statistical region: Southeast Slovenia
- Municipality: Semič
- Elevation: 711.4 m (2,334 ft)

Gričice (pronounced [ˈɡɾiːtʃitsɛ]; in older sources also Gričica, German: Obermitterdorf) is a former settlement in the Municipality of Semič in southern Slovenia. The area is part of the traditional region of Lower Carniola and is now included in the Southeast Slovenia Statistical Region. Its territory is now part of the village of Komarna Vas.

== History ==
Gričice was a Gottschee German village. In 1931 it had 10 houses. The original inhabitants were expelled in the fall of 1941. Italian troops burned the village in the summer of 1942 during the Rog Offensive. In recent years a large number of vacation houses and self-catering accommodations have been built at Gričice to serve the Bela ski center.
