= Rimsko =

- Location in Slovenia
- Coordinates: 45°33′37.19″N 15°0′1.70″E
- Country: Slovenia
- Traditional region: Lower Carniola
- Statistical region: Southeast Slovenia
- Municipality: Kočevje
- Elevation: 591.2 m (1,940 ft)

Population (2002)
  - Total: 0

Rimsko (pronounced [ˈɾiːmskɔ]; also Remergrund, in older sources also Rimski svet, German: Römergrund) is a remote abandoned former settlement in the Municipality of Kočevje in southern Slovenia. The area is part of the traditional region of Lower Carniola and is now included in the Southeast Slovenia Statistical Region. Its territory is now part of the village of Knežja Lipa.

== Name ==
The name Römergrund is derived from the dialect word ram or rom (plural rämme or römmer) 'raven' or 'carrion crow', thus meaning 'place with ravens or crows'. The Slovene writer Evgen Lah (1858–1930) speculated in 1893 that the German name Römergrund was related to Standard German Römer- ('Roman') in an essay defending the antiquity of the history of Carniola. Correspondingly, an early attempt to Slovenize the name Römergrund was Rimski svet (literally, 'Roman place, Roman area'). The modern Slovene name Rimsko (literally, 'Roman') is a similar mistranslation, and it has been characterized as a "senseless coinage for Römergrund, which has no connection at all with the Romans."

== History ==
Rimsko was a village inhabited by Gottschee Germans. Several prehistoric tumuli are located in a nearby woods along the road. Before the Second World War it had nine houses. In May 1942 the settlement was burned by Italian troops and it was not rebuilt after the war. In the 1960s a hunting lodge was built in the area.
