= Novi Tabor =

- Location in Slovenia
- Coordinates: 45°40′42.89″N 15°5′55.80″E
- Country: Slovenia
- Traditional region: Lower Carniola
- Statistical region: Southeast Slovenia
- Municipality: Semič
- Elevation: 397.2 m (1,303 ft)

Population (2002)
  - Total: none

Novi Tabor (pronounced [ˈnɔːʋi ˈtaːbɔɾ]; German: Neutabor) is an abandoned settlement in the Municipality of Semič in southern Slovenia. The area is part of the traditional region of Lower Carniola and is now included in the Southeast Slovenia Statistical Region. Its territory is now part of the village of Črmošnjice.

== History ==
Novi Tabor was a village inhabited by Gottschee Germans. It was founded during the era of Ottoman raids in the 16th century. It had seven houses in 1931. The original inhabitants were expelled in the fall of 1941. Italian troops burned the village during the Rog Offensive in the summer of 1942 and it was never rebuilt.

== Church ==
Holy Cross Church is a cemetery chapel in Novi Tabor that belongs to the parish of Črmošnjice. The church was originally consecrated to John the Baptist, and its rededication to the Holy Cross was influenced by its location at the cemetery. The church was built in the 16th century or earlier, and a 1741 record mentions that it had recently been damaged by a fire and then rededicated to the Holy Cross when it was rebuilt. The church bell was confiscated for metal during the First World War, and a new cast-iron bell was purchased in 1921. After Novi Tabor was abandoned during the Second World War, the church fell into ruin, with only the bell tower remaining intact. The church and its cemetery were renovated between 1995 and 2000, initially through the personal efforts of Hans Jaklitsch and his family, and then other villagers, especially the Rogelj family.
