= Slaba Gorica =

- Location in Slovenia
- Coordinates: 45°35′4.65″N 15°4′40.99″E
- Country: Slovenia
- Traditional region: White Carniola
- Statistical region: Southeast Slovenia
- Municipality: Črnomelj
- Elevation: 727.1 m (2,385 ft)

Population (2002)
  - Total: 0

Slaba Gorica (pronounced [ˈslaːba ˈɡoːɾitsa]; German: Schlechtbüchel) is a remote abandoned settlement in the Municipality of Črnomelj in the White Carniola area of southeastern Slovenia. The area is part of the traditional region of Lower Carniola and is now included in the Southeast Slovenia Statistical Region. Its territory is now part of the village of Rožič Vrh.

== History ==
Slaba Gorica was a Gottschee German village. In the mid-18th century it had three houses, and in 1931 it had four. The original residents were expelled in the fall of 1941. The village was burned by Italian troops during the Rog Offensive in the summer of 1942 and was never rebuilt.
