= Verdun pri Uršnih Selih =

- Location in Slovenia
- Coordinates: 45°43′9.18″N 15°5′50.95″E
- Country: Slovenia
- Traditional region: Lower Carniola
- Statistical region: Southeast Slovenia
- Municipality: Dolenjske Toplice

Area
  - Total: 3.81 km^{2} (1.47 sq mi)
- Elevation: 227.8 m (747 ft)

Population (2020)
  - Total: 66

Verdun pri Uršnih Selih (pronounced [ʋɛɾˈduːn pɾi ˈuːɾʃnix ˈseːlix]; Slovene: Verdun pri Uršnih selih) is a small settlement in the Municipality of Dolenjske Toplice in Slovenia. It lies west of Uršna Sela in the historical region of Lower Carniola. The municipality is included in the Southeast Slovenia Statistical Region.

== Name ==
The name of the settlement was changed from Verdun to Verdun pri Uršnih selih (literally, 'Verdun near Uršna Sela') in 1953. The name Verdun is derived from the Romance word *(g)uardōne(m), based on the Germanic word *wardō 'guard'. Although this place name can be understood in a military sense, it is likely that it referred instead to a place where herdsmen guarded their animals.
