= Nova Gora, Dolenjske Toplice =

Nova Gora
- Location in Slovenia
- Coordinates: 45°41′26.83″N 15°5′36.44″E
- Country: Slovenia
- Traditional region: Lower Carniola
- Statistical region: Southeast Slovenia
- Municipality: Dolenjske Toplice

Area
  - Total: 0.84 km^{2} (0.32 sq mi)
- Elevation: 376.5 m (1,235 ft)

Nova Gora (pronounced [ˈnɔːʋa ˈɡɔːɾa]; German: Neuberg) is a small settlement in the Municipality of Dolenjske Toplice in Slovenia. The area is part of the historical region of Lower Carniola. The municipality is now included in the Southeast Slovenia Statistical Region.
