= Spodnji Log, Kočevje =

Spodnji Log
- Location in Slovenia
- Coordinates: 45°31′21.52″N 15°0′39.09″E
- Country: Slovenia
- Traditional region: Lower Carniola
- Statistical region: Southeast Slovenia
- Municipality: Kočevje

Area
  - Total: 8.35 km^{2} (3.22 sq mi)
- Elevation: 493.1 m (1,618 ft)

Population (2002)
  - Total: 16
- Postal code: 1330

Spodnji Log (pronounced [ˈspoːdnji ˈloːk]; German: Unterlag) is a village in the Municipality of Kočevje in southern Slovenia. The area is part of the traditional region of Lower Carniola and is now included in the Southeast Slovenia Statistical Region.

The local church is dedicated to Saint Peter. It is an originally Gothic building that was refurbished in the Baroque style in 1708.
