= Gornja Briga =

- Location in Slovenia
- Coordinates: 45°31′46.53″N 14°48′17.06″E
- Country: Slovenia
- Traditional region: Lower Carniola
- Statistical region: Southeast Slovenia
- Municipality: Kočevje

Area
  - Total: 2.95 km^{2} (1.14 sq mi)
- Elevation: 623.3 m (2,045 ft)

Population (2002)
  - Total: 11
- Postal code: 1338

Gornja Briga (pronounced [ˈɡoːɾnja ˈbɾiːɡa]; in older sources also Gorenja Briga, German: Obertiefenbach) is a small settlement in the Municipality of Kočevje in southern Slovenia. The area is part of the traditional region of Lower Carniola and is now included in the Southeast Slovenia Statistical Region.
