= Laze pri Oneku =

- Location in Slovenia
- Coordinates: 45°36′44.21″N 14°59′30.9″E
- Country: Slovenia
- Traditional region: Lower Carniola
- Statistical region: Southeast Slovenia
- Municipality: Kočevje

Area
  - Total: 1.59 km^{2} (0.61 sq mi)
- Elevation: 823.1 m (2,700 ft)

Population (2002)
  - Total: 0
- Postal code: 1330

Laze pri Oneku (pronounced [ˈlaːzɛ pri ˈoːnɛku]; German: Neufriesach) is a settlement in the Municipality of Kočevje in southern Slovenia. It was a village settled by Gottschee Germans. During the Second World War its original population was expelled. The area is part of the traditional region of Lower Carniola and is now included in the Southeast Slovenia Statistical Region.

== Name ==
The name of the settlement was changed from Laze to Laze pri Oneku in 1955.

== Church ==
The local church, dedicated to Saint Joseph, was a Late Gothic church that was demolished after 1947.
