= Komolec =

- Location in Slovenia
- Coordinates: 45°44′47.48″N 14°58′28.80″E
- Country: Slovenia
- Traditional region: Lower Carniola
- Statistical region: Southeast Slovenia
- Municipality: Kočevje

Area
  - Total: 8.27 km^{2} (3.19 sq mi)

Population (2002)
  - Total: 0

Komolec (pronounced [kɔːˈmoːləts]; also Komuc, German: Komutzen, also Komuzen, Gottscheerish: Komüzə) is a settlement in the Municipality of Kočevje in southern Slovenia. It no longer has any permanent residents.

== Name ==
There are various theories of the origin of the name Komolec. According to Simonič, the name is derived from Slovene komolec, referring to a hill with a steep slope or a rockfall (cf. also komộłəc 'hill' in Pleteršnik's dictionary. On the other hand, Petschauer cites a derivation from Mölzen 'place with many broken-off branches'. Komolec was also recorded as Gomülcz, Gomotzen, or Prunndorf.

== History ==
Komolec was a village inhabited by Gottschee Germans. It was one of the oldest settlements on the Kočevje Rog Plateau, established after external colonization by German settlers had been completed around 1400. In the Kočevje land registry of 1574 Komolec had three full farms that were subdivided into six half-farms. In 1770 the village had 10 or 39 houses. The population of the settlement peaked in 1890, with 162 people living in 30 houses. Agricultural conditions were poor, with a few meadows and pastures, and the economy of the village was primarily based on forestry. The inhabitants were known for making wooden tubs and wagons. Before the Second World War, the settlement had 23 houses. The original residents were evicted on 23 and 24 November 1941. Italian troops quartered themselves in the abandoned houses on 17 July 1942, but were attacked there by Partisan forces the next day. Komolec was burned by Italian troops during the Rog Offensive in late August 1942, leaving only one house. A base and a warehouse for the staff of the 7th Partisan Corps was established here in 1944. The base was burned in April 1945 during German operations to secure the road from Kočevje. Until that time two Partisan hospitals (Mali Ajdovec and Veliki Ajdovec), established in October 1944, also operated in the area. In the 1950s, one house and two barns in Komolec were rebuilt for the needs of a collective farm. Four people were recorded living at the site in 1953 and 1961, but the site was then abandoned and the barns were torn down. A chapel shrine stood at the western edge of the village.
