= Dobindol =

- Location in Slovenia
- Coordinates: 45°43′0.69″N 15°6′58.91″E
- Country: Slovenia
- Traditional region: Lower Carniola
- Statistical region: Southeast Slovenia
- Municipality: Dolenjske Toplice

Area
  - Total: 3.29 km^{2} (1.27 sq mi)
- Elevation: 259 m (850 ft)

Population (2020)
  - Total: 118
  - Density: 35.9/km^{2} (92.9/sq mi)

Dobindol (pronounced [ˈdoːbindɔu̯], in older sources Dobni Dol; German: Eichenthal) is a settlement in the Municipality of Dolenjske Toplice in Slovenia. The area is part of the historical region of Lower Carniola. The municipality is now included in the Southeast Slovenia Statistical Region.

A small chapel-shrine on the eastern edge of the settlement was built in 1919.
