= Brezovica pri Črmošnjicah =

Brezovica pri Črmošnjicah Brezje (until 1955)
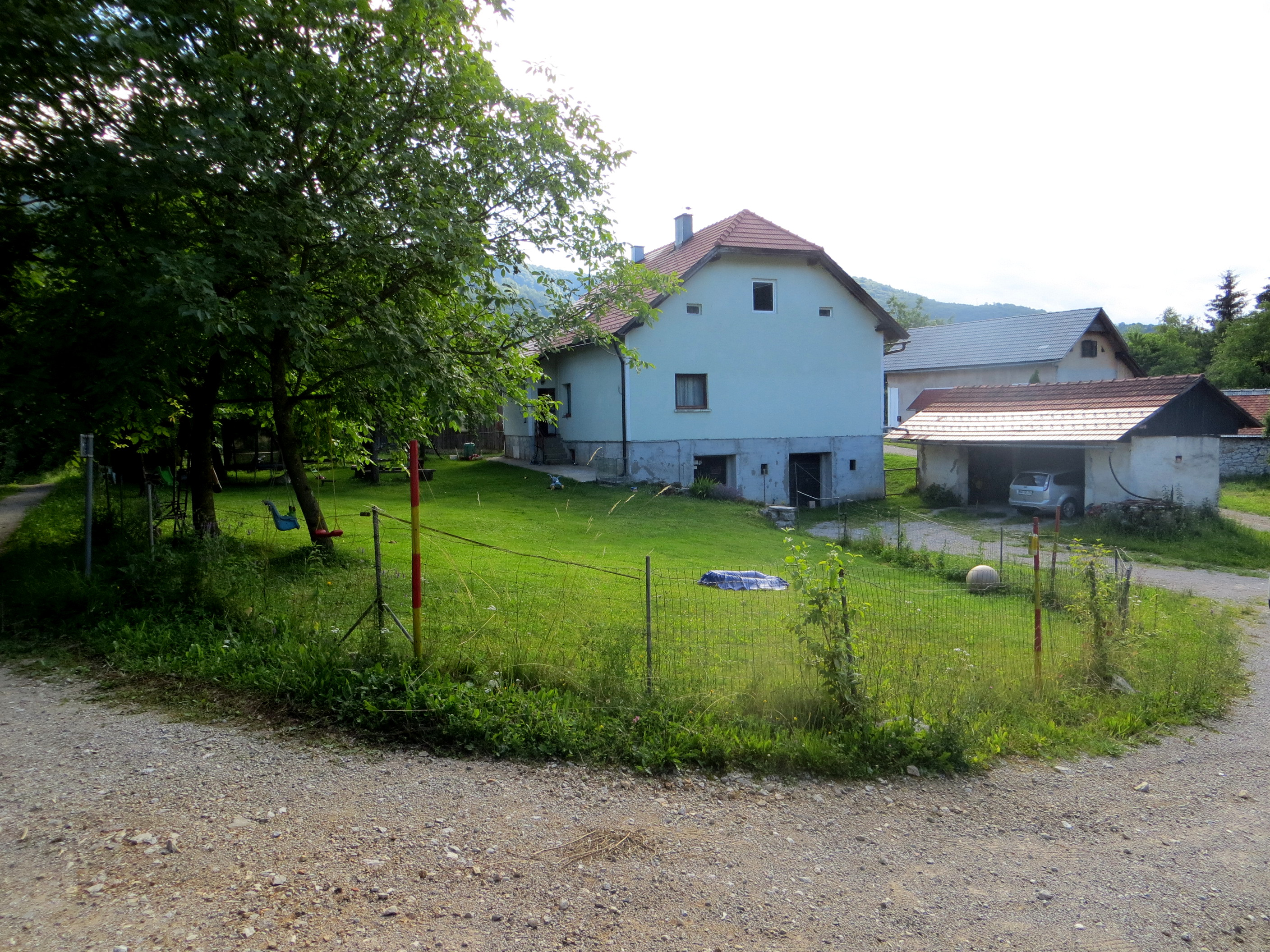

- Location in Slovenia
- Coordinates: 45°39′15″N 15°7′25″E
- Country: Slovenia
- Traditional region: Lower Carniola
- Statistical region: Southeast Slovenia
- Municipality: Semič

Area
  - Total: 2.48 km^{2} (0.96 sq mi)
- Elevation: 543.2 m (1,782 ft)

Population (2002)
  - Total: 6

Brezovica pri Črmošnjicah (pronounced [ˈbɾéːzɔʋitsa pɾi tʃəɾmɔˈʃnjìːtsax, -njíː-]; formerly Brezje; German: Wrezen, Wretzen, Gottschee German: Brezə) is a small settlement in the Municipality of Semič in Slovenia. The area is part of the historical region of Lower Carniola. The municipality is now included in the Southeast Slovenia Statistical Region.

== Geography ==
The settlement stands on a small hill above the road from Črnomelj to Dolenjske Toplice in the Črmošnjice Valley (Slovene: Črmošnjiška dolina) at the tectonic division between the Gorjanci Mountains and Kočevje Rog. There are fields west of the settlement, as well as former pastures undergoing afforestation and sparse birch and fern woods. There are gravel pits on Gaberkofel Hill (717 m). During dry periods, water was hauled to the village from springs north of the village. These springs also join to form Wild Creek (Divji potok), which flows to Srednja Vas. Springs south of the village join to form Blatnik Creek (Blatniški potok), also known as Little River (Rečica). The territory of the village now also includes the former village of Stari Tabor.

== Name ==
The name Brezovica pri Črmošnjicah means 'Brezovica near Črmošnjice'. The settlement was recorded as Presaitz in the land registry of 1574. The names Brezovica, Brezje, and names like them are relatively common in Slovenia and in other Slavic countries (e.g., Březovice in the Czech Republic, Brezovica in Serbia, etc.). The Slovene names Brezovica and Brezje are derived from the common noun breza 'birch'. Like similar toponyms in Slovenia (e.g., Brezova, Brezovec, Brezovci), it originally referred to the local vegetation. The German names Wrezen and Wretzen, as well as the Gottschee German form Brezə, are derived from the Slovene name. The settlement was renamed Brezovica pri Črmošnjicah in June 1955.

== History ==
Brezovica pri Črmošnjicah was inhabited by Gottschee Germans, who were mostly evicted in 1941 during the Second World War. It was founded by Slovene settlers and was one of the oldest Slovene settlements in the Gottschee region. However, by 1890, nearly the entire population was German-speaking, with only two speakers of Slovenian recorded in the census. According to the land registry of 1574, Brezovica pri Črmošnjicah had seven half-farms and four tenant farms. There were 15 houses in the settlement in 1710. The village reached its peak population in 1900, with 108 people living in 23 houses, and then went into decline after the First World War. Before the Second World War, the economy of the village was based on agriculture and raising livestock. The livestock was sold at fairs, and there was also limited commercial wine production and sales of timber. During the Second World War, the German-speaking population—80 people from 20 families—was evicted on 10 and 11 December 1941. The village was bombarded by German forces on 24 October 1943, nearly completely destroying it. The village has had a small population living in two houses since the Second World War.

== Church ==
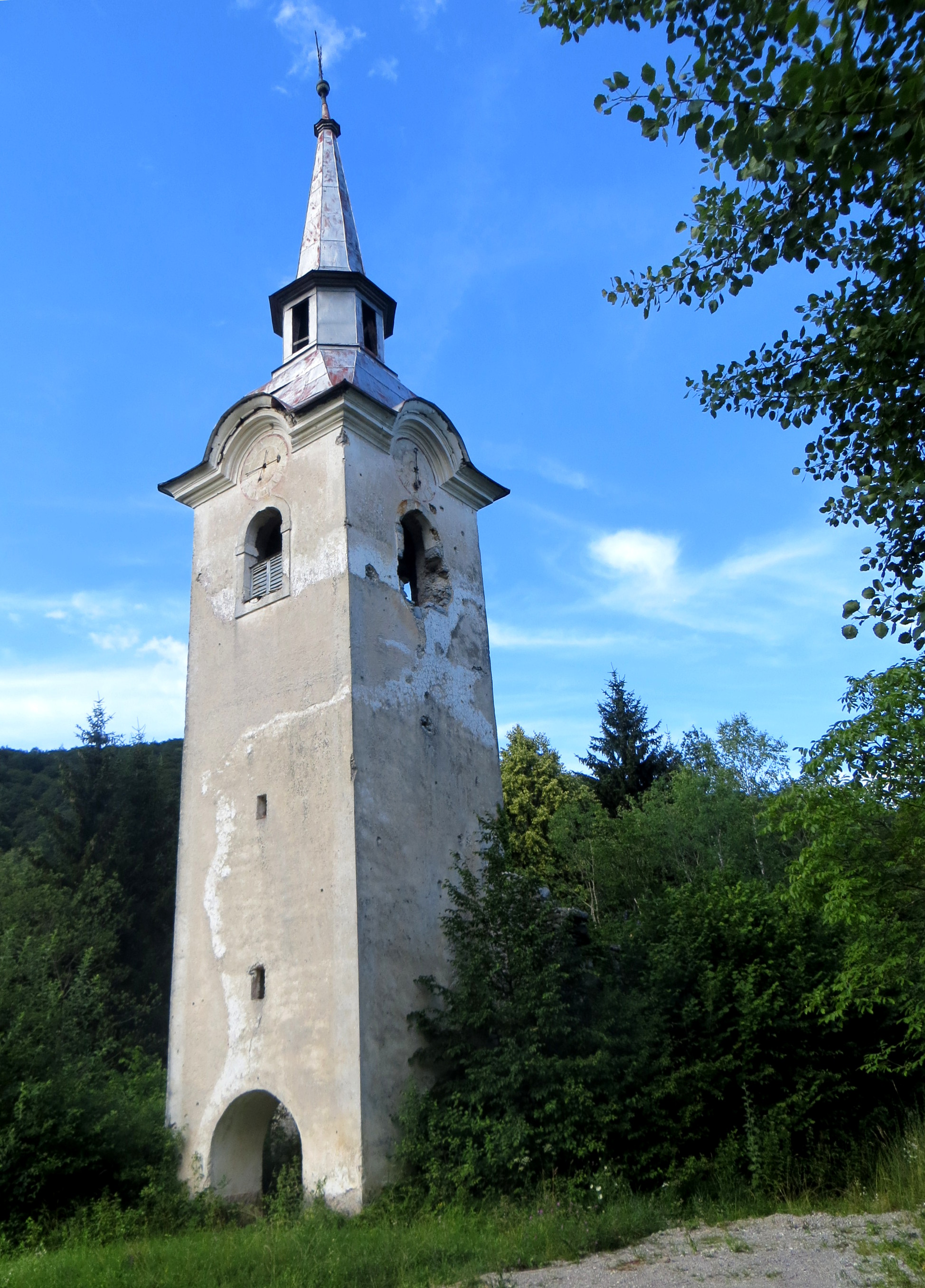
Belfry

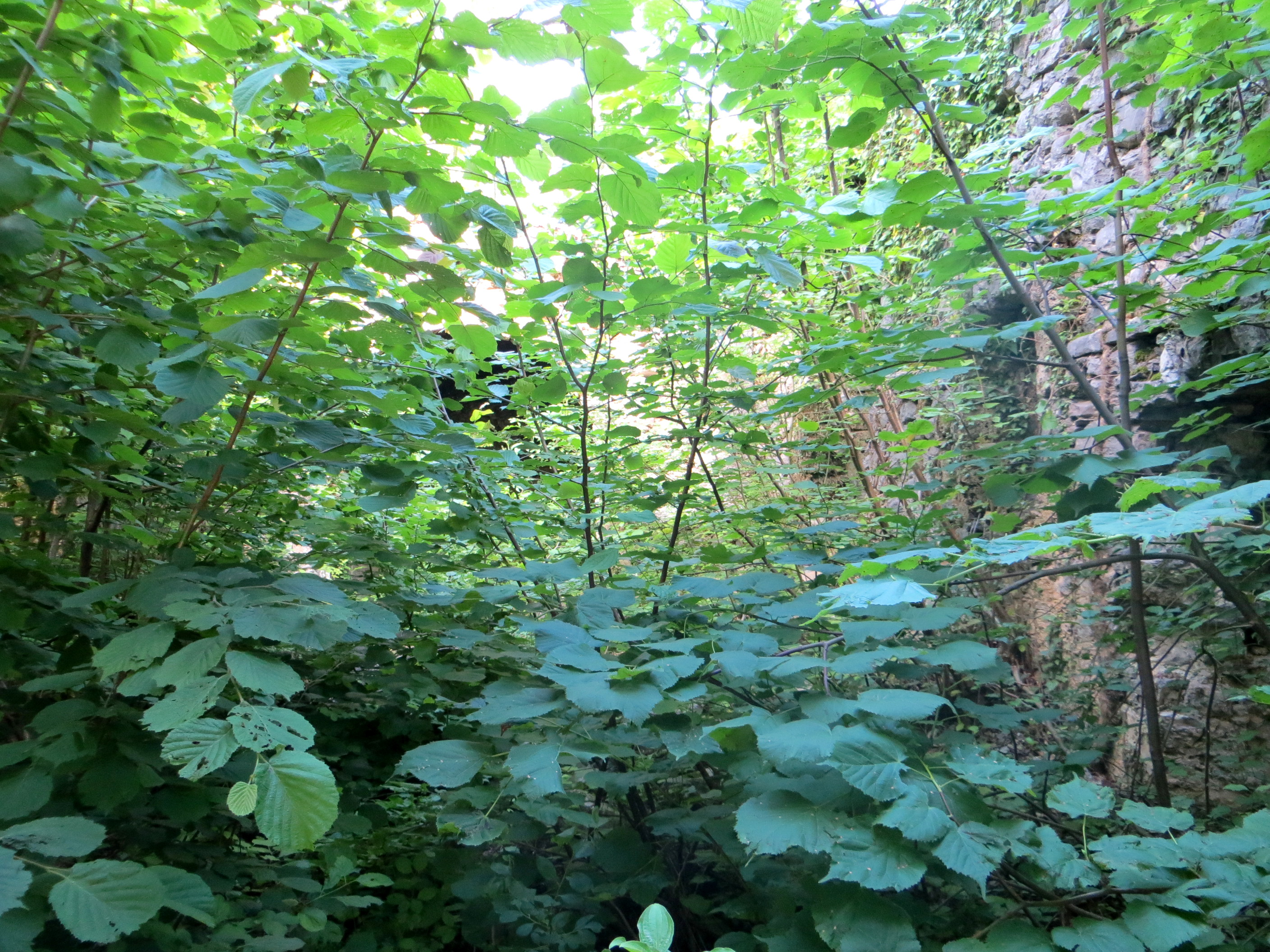
Interior

Saint Florian's Church

The local church is now only a ruin, with only the belfry and the walls of the nave remaining. It was dedicated to Saint Florian and dated to around 1600. It was restored in 1890. The church was first mentioned in a visitation report from 1753. It had a rectangular nave, apparently barrel-vaulted and plastered-over wood timbering. A wooden choir loft stood above the entrance and also provided access to the bell tower. The chancel was pentagonal and had a window on each side. The church was damaged during the German bombardment in 1943, when the roof timbering burned. It was not restored after the war, despite efforts from the local Lukan family. The parish abandoned the building in 1963, removing the bells. The rest of the furnishings were removed by various collectors, including the main altar with a statue of Saint Florian in the central niche and additional statues on the sides and in the pediment, a side altar with a statue of Saint Vitus, and a statue of Our Lady of Lourdes created by August König from Srobotnik.

There were five chapel-shrines in the village before the Second World War: a masonry shrine on the southwest edge of the village along the road to Stari Tabor, a masonry shrine on the northern edge of the village at the fork in the road to Srednja Vas and Gaber, a shrine about 320 m south of the church along the road to Stari Tabor, a shrine about 360 m to the northwest along the road to Srednja Vas, and a shrine about 180 m south of the church.
