= Dolenja Brezovica, Brezovica =

Dolenja Brezovica
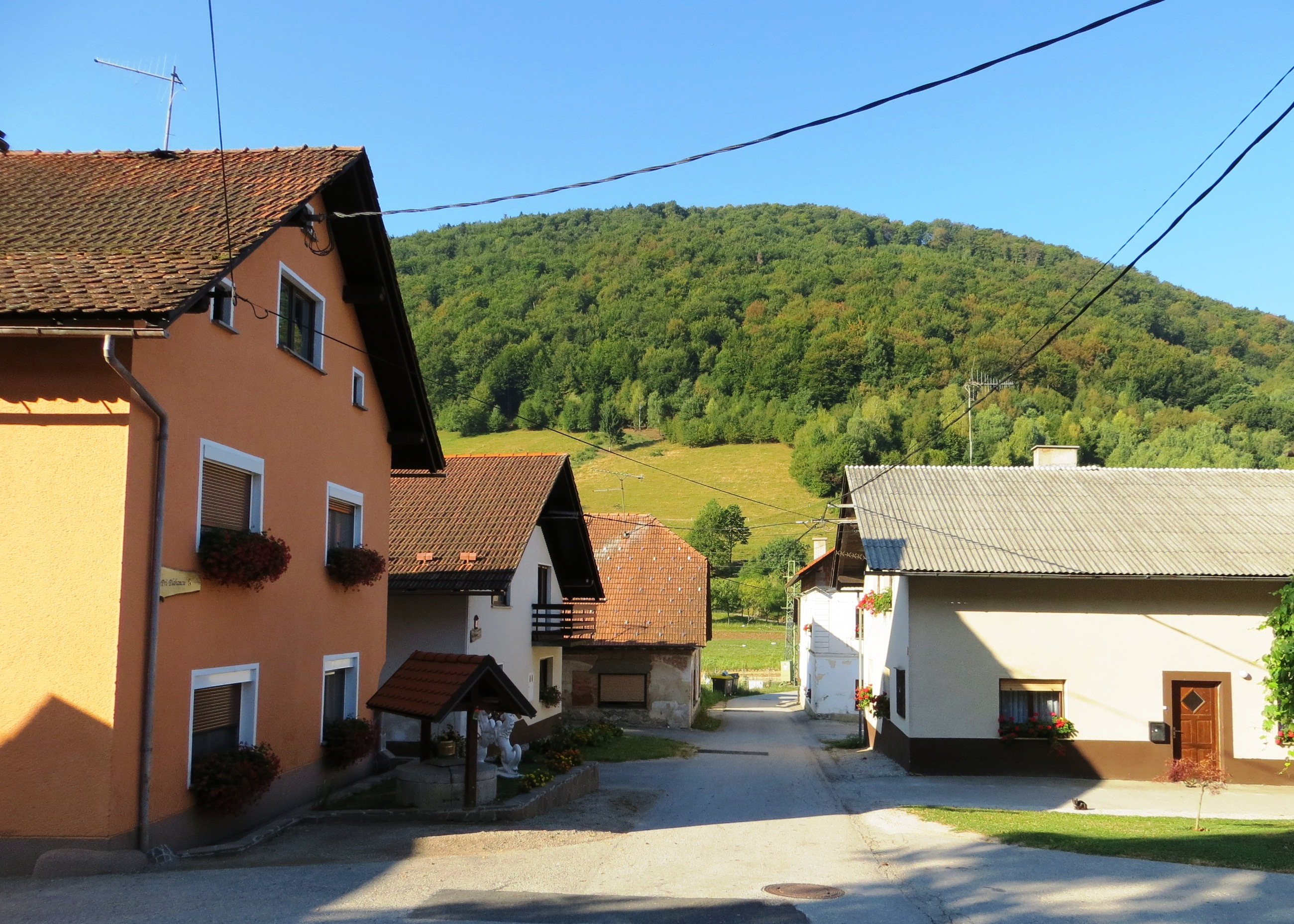

- Location in Slovenia
- Coordinates: 45°56′47.37″N 14°25′50.84″E
- Country: Slovenia
- Traditional region: Inner Carniola
- Statistical region: Central Slovenia
- Municipality: Brezovica

Area
  - Total: 1.78 km^{2} (0.69 sq mi)
- Elevation: 369.9 m (1,214 ft)

Population (2020)
  - Total: 53
  - Density: 30/km^{2} (77/sq mi)
- Postal code: 1292

Dolenja Brezovica (pronounced [dɔˈlèːnja ˈbɾéːzɔʋitsa]; German: Unterbresowitz) is a settlement in the Municipality of Brezovica in central Slovenia. The municipality is part of the traditional region of Inner Carniola and is now included in the Central Slovenia Statistical Region.

== Geography ==
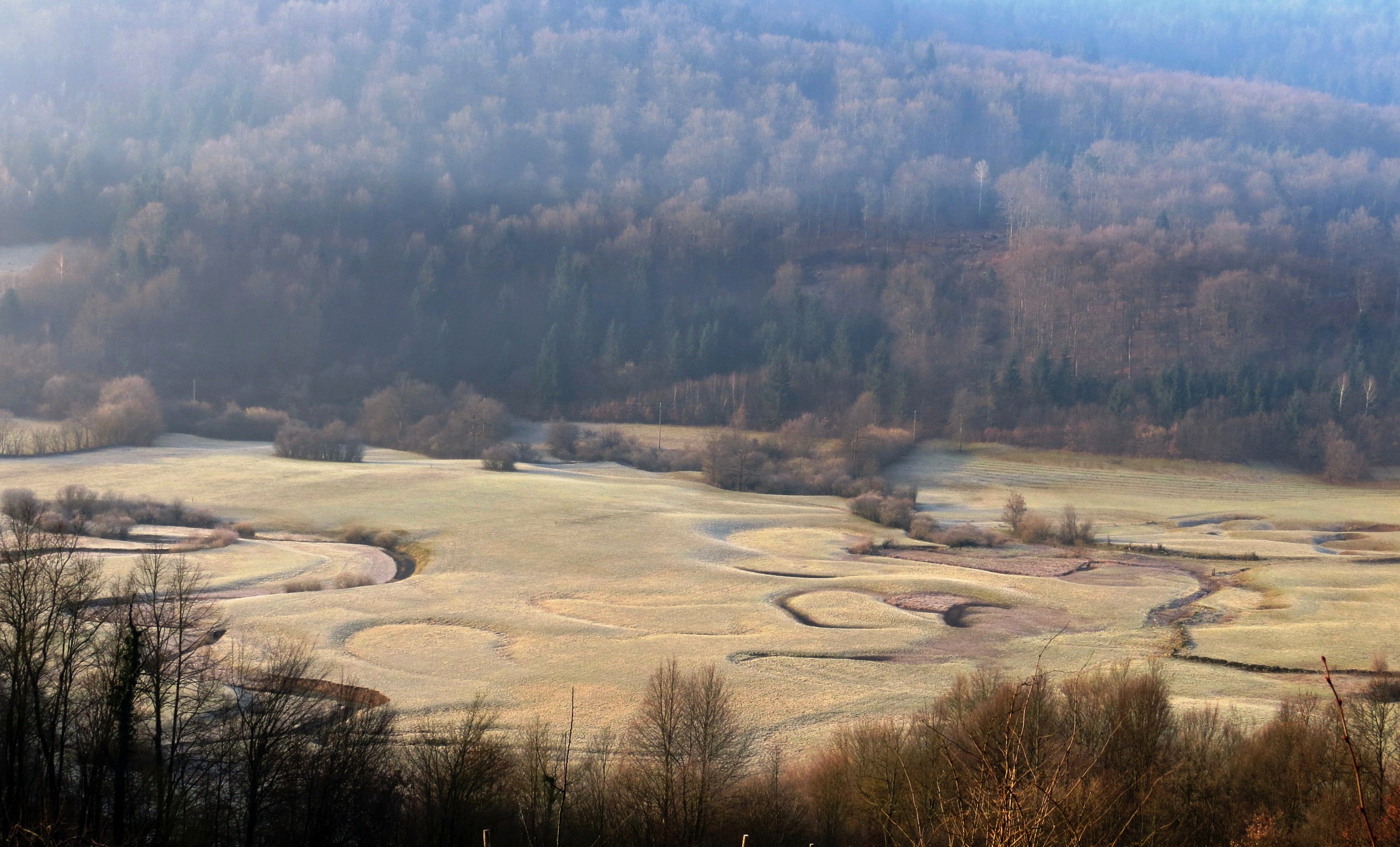
The Ponikve Karst Field

Dolenja Brezovica is a clustered village southeast of Preserje on the west slope of Lisec Hill (673 meters or 2,208 feet) at the bottom of a dry karst valley. Above the village, the valley rises steeply towards Gorenja Brezovica, and to the northwest it drops to the small Ponikve Karst Field. During heavy rains, Ponikva Creek in the karst field floods; it surfaces here after running below ground from Rakitna and then disappears into the Rupe Sinkholes at the northwest end of the karst field. Tilled fields and meadows cover the floor of the dry karst valley, and the slopes of Lisec Hill to the northeast and Štanga Hill (644 meters or 2,113 feet) to the southwest are wooded. There is a low-quality hay field mowed once a year at Pungert on the lower slope of Štanga Hill.

== Name ==
The name Dolenja Brezovica literally means 'lower Brezovica', distinguishing the village from neighboring Gorenja Brezovica (literally, 'upper Brezovica'). The names Brezovica, Brezje, and names like them are relatively common in Slovenia and in other Slavic countries (e.g., Březovice in the Czech Republic, Brezovica in Serbia, etc.). The Slovene names Brezovica and Brezje are derived from the common noun breza 'birch'. Like similar toponyms in Slovenia (e.g., Brezova, Brezovec, Brezovci), it originally referred to the local vegetation.
