= Gorenja Brezovica, Brezovica =

Gorenja Brezovica
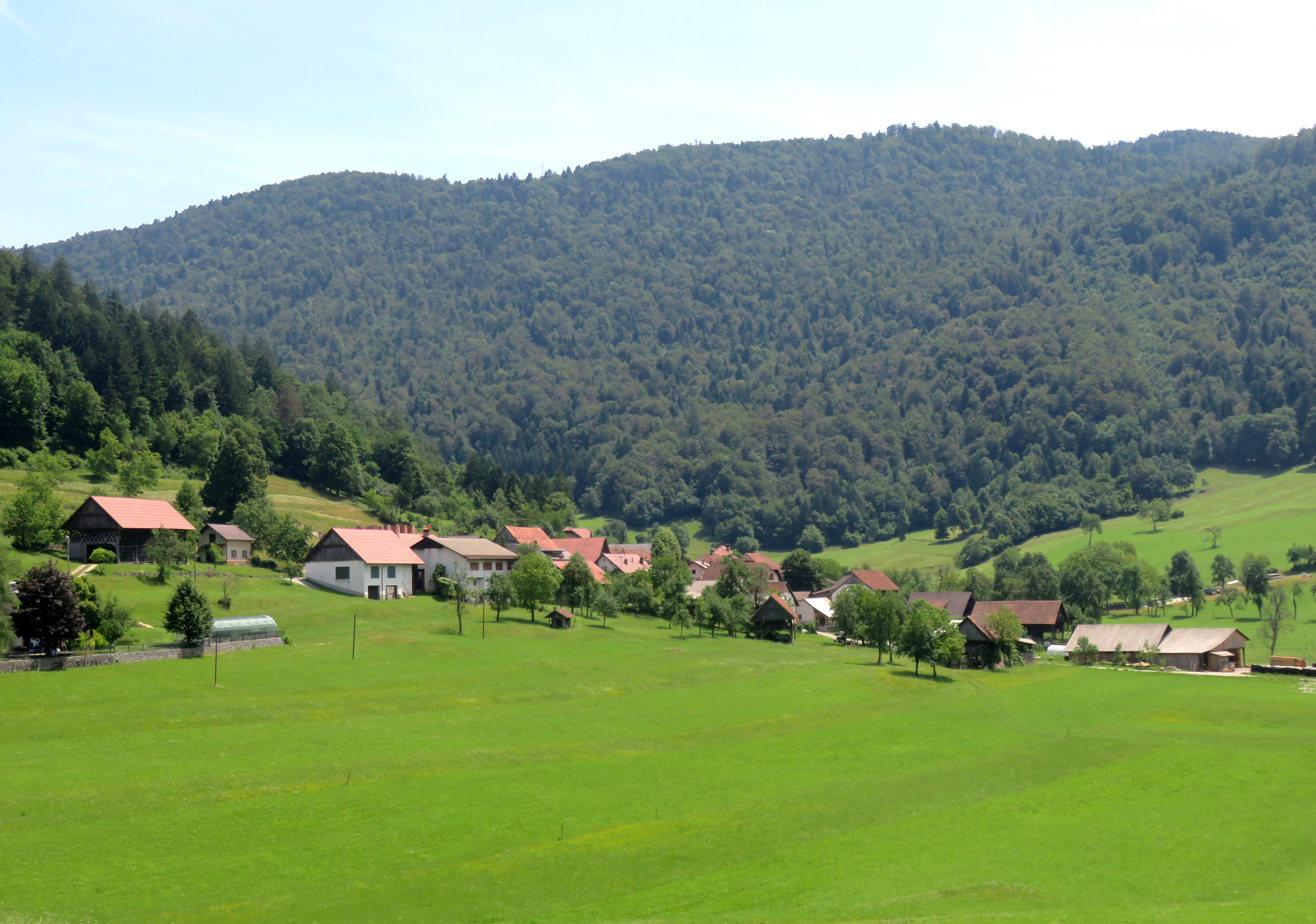

- Location in Slovenia
- Coordinates: 45°56′18.7″N 14°26′24.24″E
- Country: Slovenia
- Traditional region: Inner Carniola
- Statistical region: Central Slovenia
- Municipality: Brezovica

Area
  - Total: 14.82 km^{2} (5.72 sq mi)
- Elevation: 481.2 m (1,579 ft)

Population (2020)
  - Total: 53
  - Density: 3.6/km^{2} (9.3/sq mi)
- Postal code: 1292

Gorenja Brezovica (pronounced [ɡɔˈɾèːnja ˈbɾéːzɔʋitsa]; German: Oberbresowitz) is a village in the Municipality of Brezovica in central Slovenia. The municipality is part of the traditional region of Inner Carniola and is now included in the Central Slovenia Statistical Region.

== Geography ==
Gorenja Brezovica is a ribbon village in the upper part of a dry karst valley with sinkholes that rises from the small Ponikve Karst Field in Dolenja Brezovica towards Middle Hill (Slovene: Srednji hrib; 836 meters or 2,743 feet) to the south. Houses in the village are arranged along the slope of Vrh Hill (606 meters or 1,988 feet), which rises to the northeast. Other wooded hills surround the village, including Lopata Hill (811 meters or 2,661 feet) to the southeast with Gnojevec Hill (983 meters or 3,225 feet) rising behind it, and Sleme Hill (652 meters or 2,139 feet) to the southwest with Linte Hill (778 meters or 2,552 feet) rising behind it. In the dry valley below the village there are field areas named Krnice, Platovi, and Velike Njive, and west of these is Štanga Hill (644 meters or 2,113 feet) with low-quality hay fields mowed once a year. An intermittent pond lies along the road to Rakitna. Above it, in the area known as Preval, is Napajalna Spring (now abandoned), and Podobnica Spring lies below Lopata Hill. There are several caves in the area.

== Name ==
The name Gorenja Brezovica literally means 'upper Brezovica', distinguishing the village from neighboring Dolenja Brezovica (literally, 'lower Brezovica'). The names Brezovica, Brezje, and names like them are relatively common in Slovenia and in other Slavic countries (e.g., Březovice in the Czech Republic, Brezovica in Serbia, etc.). The Slovene names Brezovica and Brezje are derived from the common noun breza 'birch'. Like similar toponyms in Slovenia (e.g., Brezova, Brezovec, Brezovci), it originally referred to the local vegetation. In the local dialect, the village is known as Gornja Brezovica.

== History ==
During the Second World War, Italian forces set up a post in the village during the Rog Offensive in the summer of 1942. The local people took refuge during the war in Cerk Cave (Slovene: Cerkova jama) on Lopata Hill and also in a smaller cave in the Rutar Commons (Slovene: Rutarjeva gmajna).
