= Brezovica, Zagorje ob Savi =

Brezovica
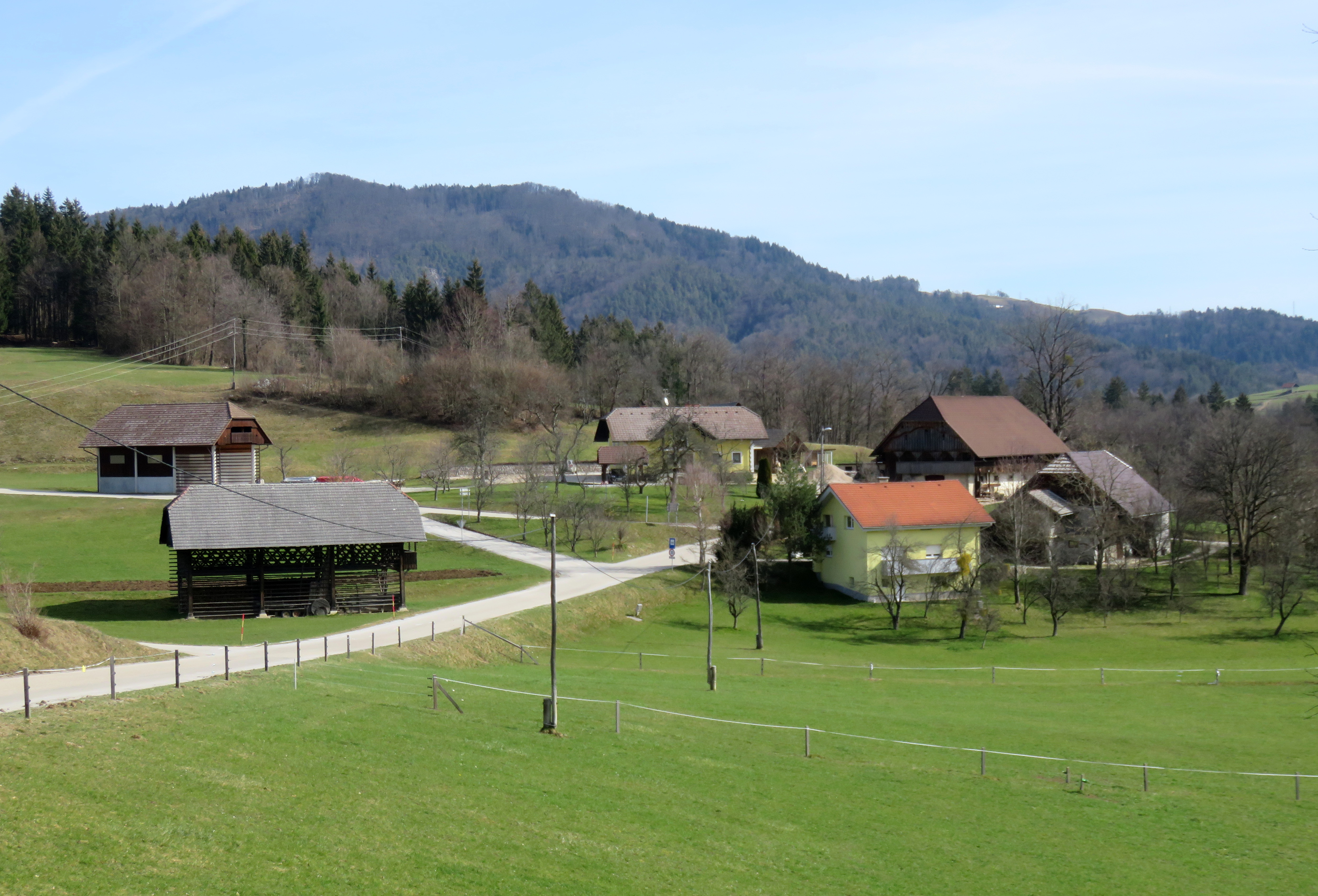

- Location in Slovenia
- Coordinates: 46°6′38″N 14°54′27″E
- Country: Slovenia
- Traditional region: Upper Carniola
- Statistical region: Central Sava
- Municipality: Zagorje ob Savi
- Elevation: 554 m (1,818 ft)

Brezovica (pronounced [ˈbɾeːzɔʋitsa], German: Bresovic) is a former village in central Slovenia in the Municipality of Zagorje ob Savi. It is now part of the village of Tirna. It is part of the traditional region of Upper Carniola and is now included in the Central Sava Statistical Region.

== Geography ==
Brezovica stands north of the village center of Tirna. The road from Selce to Tirna passes through Brezovica.

== Name ==
The names Brezovica, Brezje, and names like them are relatively common in Slovenia and in other Slavic countries (e.g., Březovice in the Czech Republic, Brezovica in Serbia, etc.). The Slovene name Brezovica is derived from the common noun breza 'birch'. Like similar toponyms in Slovenia (e.g., Brezova, Brezovec, Brezovci), it originally referred to the local vegetation.

== History ==
Brezovica had a population of 24 (in three houses) in 1890 and 17 (in two houses) in 1900. Brezovica was annexed by Tirna in 1953, ending its existence as a separate settlement.
