= Brezovica pri Predgradu =

- Location in Slovenia
- Coordinates: 45°32′46.37″N 15°2′38.06″E
- Country: Slovenia
- Traditional region: Lower Carniola
- Statistical region: Southeast Slovenia
- Municipality: Kočevje

Area
  - Total: 5.21 km^{2} (2.01 sq mi)
- Elevation: 505.5 m (1,658 ft)

Population (2002)
  - Total: 52
- Postal code: 8342

Brezovica pri Predgradu (pronounced [ˈbɾéːzɔʋitsa pɾi ˈpɾéːdɡɾadu]; German: Bresowitz) is a small settlement in the Municipality of Kočevje in southern Slovenia. The area is in the Southeast Slovenia Statistical Region and is part of the traditional region of Lower Carniola.

== Geography ==
Brezovica pri Predgradu is located on the upper rim of the Poljane Valley (Slovene: Poljanska dolina) along the road from Kočevje to Črnomelj. It includes the hamlet of Zaderc (German: Saderz) half a kilometer south of the main settlement. There are several springs and caves in the area. Brezovica Spring (Brezoviški studenec) is below Straža Hill, and Klinlehl Cave stands above it. West of this is Miner's Cave (Rudniška jama), from which a spring feeds the creek in the Vimolj Gully (Vimoljski jarek). Miner's Cave was a source of coal before the Second World War. The Vidmar Spring (Vidmarski studenec) flows into the Vimolj Gully between Brezovica and the hamlet of Videm in Knežja Lipa. The Zaderc Spring (Zaderški studenec) is located 1 km southwest of Zaderc.

== Name ==
The name Brezovica pri Predgradu means 'Brezovica near Predgrad'. The name Brezovica and names like it are relatively common in Slovenia and in other Slavic countries (e.g., Březovice in the Czech Republic, Brezovica in Serbia, etc.). The name Brezovica is derived from the word breza 'birch'. Like similar toponyms in Slovenia (e.g., Brezova, Brezovec, Brezovci), it originally referred to the local vegetation. The German name Bresowitz is derived from the Slovene name. The name of the settlement was changed from Brezovica to Brezovica pri Predgradu in 1953.

== History ==
Brezovica pri Predgradu was a mixed Slovene and Gottschee German village. During the feudal era it belonged to the Dominion of Poljane and in 1576 it had four full farms. It was an enterprising village, with two shops and an inn before the Second World War. The Gottschee Germans were evicted in the fall of 1941. Italian troops burned all but three houses in the village on 15 September 1942. After the armistice between Italy and Allied armed forces, the Partisans built a bunker in the forest east of the village to store weapons and food. The bunker was discovered by German and Home Guard forces in the fall of 1943 and blown up. Out of 13 houses in the village from before the war, only three were left after the war: two farmhouses and one lived in by a forestry worker and his family.
