= Rakitna =

Rakitna may refer to:

- Rakitna, Brezovica, a village in Municipality of Brezovica, Slovenia
- Rakitna, Blagoevgrad Province, a village in Blagoevgrad Province, Bulgaria
