= Veliki Okič =

- Location in Slovenia
- Coordinates: 46°19′25.94″N 15°57′51.85″E
- Country: Slovenia
- Traditional region: Styria
- Statistical region: Drava
- Municipality: Videm

Area
  - Total: 2.99 km^{2} (1.15 sq mi)
- Elevation: 308.1 m (1,011 ft)

Population (2024)
  - Total: 84

Veliki Okič (pronounced [ˈʋeːliki ˈoːkitʃ], German: Großokitsch) is a settlement in the Haloze Hills in eastern Slovenia. It lies close to the border with Croatia in the Municipality of Videm. The area is part of the traditional region of Styria. It is now included in the Drava Statistical Region.

== Name ==
The name Veliki Okič literally means 'big Okič', contrasting with Mali Okič (literally, 'little Okič') in the neighboring Municipality of Cirkulane. In the past, Veliki Okič was much larger than Mali Okič (e.g., in 1900 they had populations of 288 vs. 92, respectively), but today Mali Okič has a larger population.
