= Mali Okič =

- Location in Slovenia
- Coordinates: 46°20′0.61″N 15°57′49.84″E
- Country: Slovenia
- Traditional region: Styria
- Statistical region: Drava
- Municipality: Cirkulane

Area
  - Total: 1.52 km^{2} (0.59 sq mi)
- Elevation: 279.5 m (917 ft)

Population (2024)
  - Total: 102
  - Density: 67.1/km^{2} (174/sq mi)

Mali Okič (pronounced [ˈmaːli ˈoːkitʃ], German: Kleinokitsch) is a settlement in the Municipality of Cirkulane in the Haloze area of eastern Slovenia. It lies dispersed in the hills southwest of Cirkulane towards the border with Croatia. The area belongs to the traditional region of Styria. It is now included in the Drava Statistical Region.

== Name ==
The name Mali Okič literally means 'little Okič', contrasting with Veliki Okič (literally, 'big Okič') in the neighboring Municipality of Videm. In the past, Veliki Okič was much larger than Mali Okič (e.g., in 1900 they had populations of 288 vs. 92, respectively), but today Mali Okič has a larger population.
