= Slatina, Cirkulane =

Slatina
- Location in Slovenia
- Coordinates: 46°19′33.66″N 15°58′35.47″E
- Country: Slovenia
- Traditional region: Styria
- Statistical region: Drava
- Municipality: Cirkulane

Area
  - Total: 1.86 km^{2} (0.72 sq mi)
- Elevation: 319.3 m (1,048 ft)

Population (2020)
  - Total: 108
  - Density: 58.1/km^{2} (150/sq mi)

Slatina (pronounced [ˈslaːtina]) is a settlement in the Municipality of Cirkulane in the Haloze area of eastern Slovenia. It lies in the hills southwest of Cirkulane. The area is part of the traditional region of Styria. It is now included in the Drava Statistical Region.
