= Selce, Zagorje ob Savi =

Selce
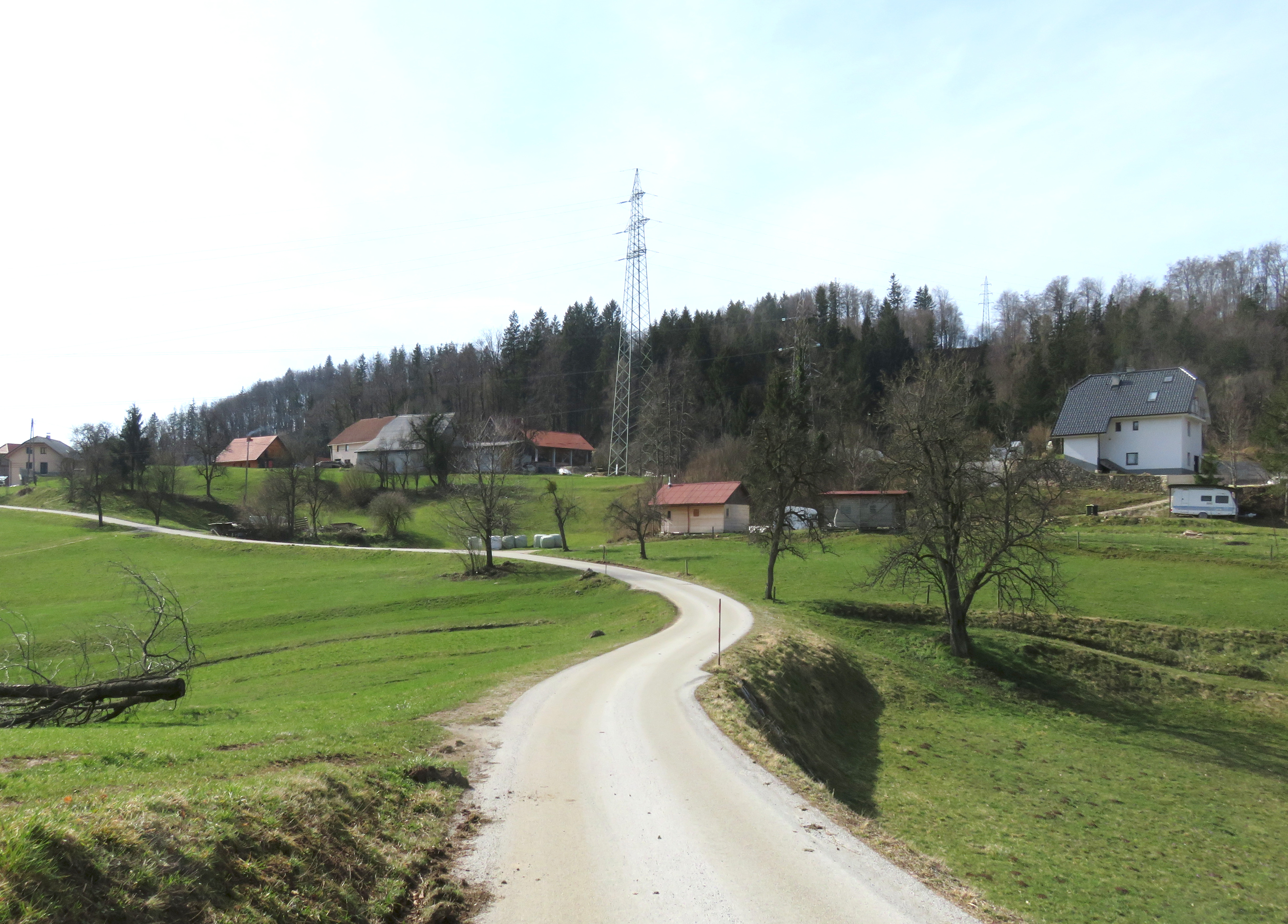

- Location in Slovenia
- Coordinates: 46°6′20″N 14°54′54″E
- Country: Slovenia
- Traditional region: Upper Carniola
- Statistical region: Central Sava
- Municipality: Zagorje ob Savi
- Elevation: 550 m (1,800 ft)

Selce (pronounced [ˈseːu̯tsɛ], German: Selze) is a former village in central Slovenia in the Municipality of Zagorje ob Savi. It is now part of the village of Tirna. It is part of the traditional region of Upper Carniola and is now included in the Central Sava Statistical Region.

== Geography ==
Selce stands on a hill east of Tirna above the Mošenik Gorge (Slovene: Mošenjska grapa). It is connected to Tirna by a road through the hamlet of Brezovica.

== Name ==
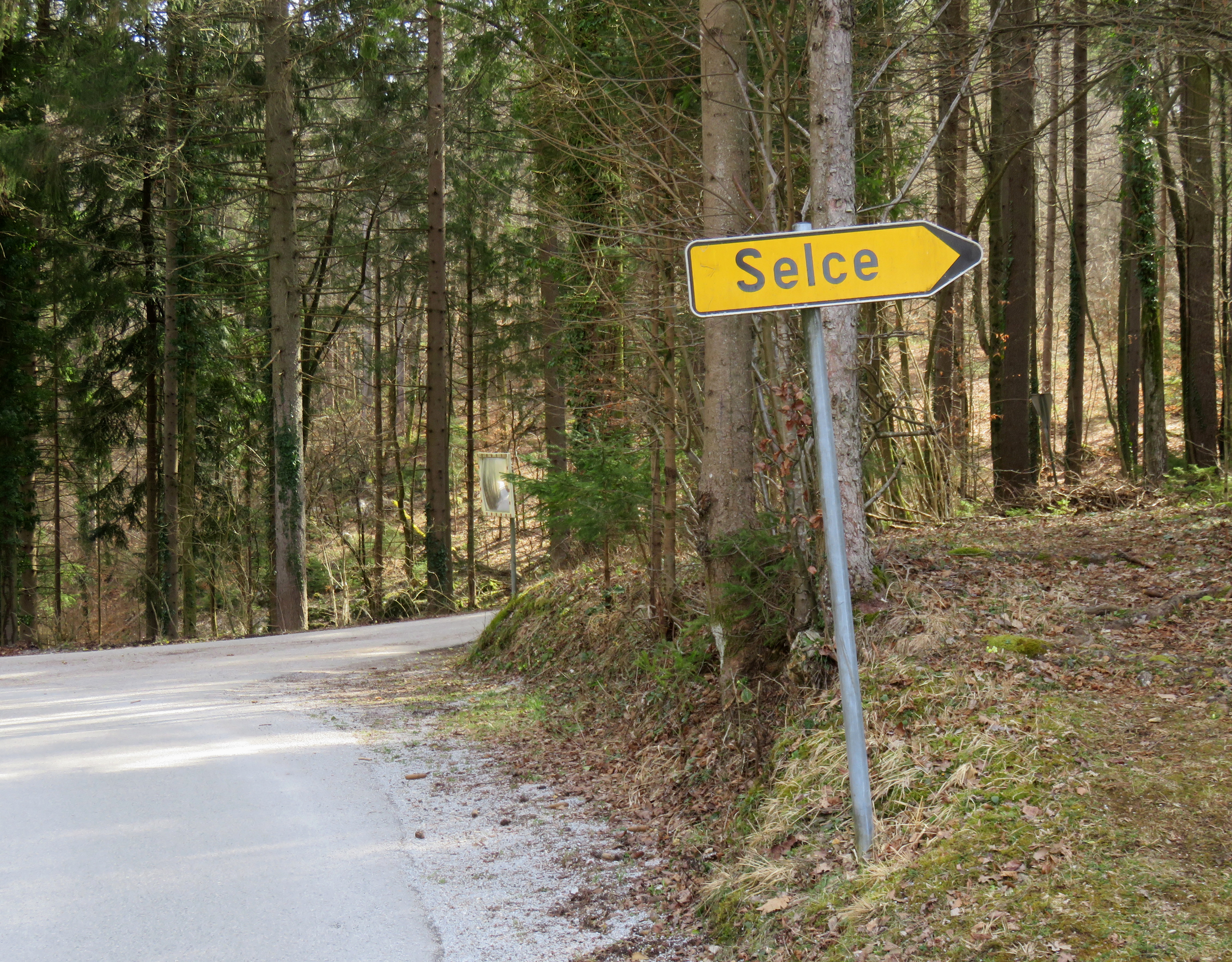
Road sign for Selce

The name Selce is a plural diminutive of the common noun selo 'settlement, village'. It is related to toponyms such as Selo, Sela, and Selca.

== History ==
Selce had a population of 34 (in five houses) in 1890 and 26 (in six houses) in 1900. Selce was annexed by Tirna in 1953, ending its existence as a separate settlement.
