= Pohorje, Cirkulane =

Pohorje
- Location in Slovenia
- Coordinates: 46°19′21.67″N 15°59′14.52″E
- Country: Slovenia
- Traditional region: Styria
- Statistical region: Drava
- Municipality: Cirkulane

Area
  - Total: 1.61 km^{2} (0.62 sq mi)
- Elevation: 298.4 m (979 ft)

Population (2020)
  - Total: 104
  - Density: 64.6/km^{2} (167/sq mi)

Pohorje (pronounced [ˈpóːxɔɾjɛ]) is a settlement in the Municipality of Cirkulane in the Haloze area of eastern Slovenia. It lies in the hills south of Cirkulane, on the border with Croatia. The area is part of the traditional region of Styria. It is now included in the Drava Statistical Region.

The local church is dedicated to Saint Elisabeth of Hungary and belongs to the Parish of Cirkulane. It was built in 1673.
