= Medribnik =

- Location in Slovenia
- Coordinates: 46°20′1″N 16°0′13.22″E
- Country: Slovenia
- Traditional region: Styria
- Statistical region: Drava
- Municipality: Cirkulane

Area
  - Total: 3.37 km^{2} (1.30 sq mi)
- Elevation: 225 m (738 ft)

Population (2020)
  - Total: 138
  - Density: 40.9/km^{2} (106/sq mi)

Medribnik (pronounced [mɛˈdɾiːbnik]) is a settlement in the Municipality of Cirkulane in the Haloze area of eastern Slovenia. It lies in the valley of Belica Creek south of Cirkulane towards the border with Croatia. The area is part of the traditional region of Styria. It is now included in the Drava Statistical Region.
