= Hrib pri Koprivniku =

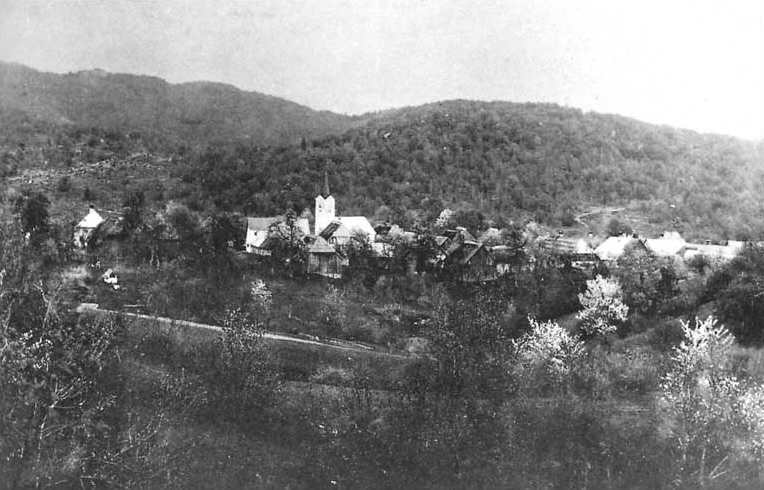
- Hrib pri Koprivniku in 1936

- Location in Slovenia
- Coordinates: 45°35′10.96″N 15°2′51.2″E
- Country: Slovenia
- Traditional region: Lower Carniola
- Statistical region: Southeast Slovenia
- Municipality: Kočevje

Area
  - Total: 6.77 km^{2} (2.61 sq mi)

Population (2014)
  - Total: 1

Hrib pri Koprivniku (pronounced [ˈxɾiːp pri kɔˈpɾiːu̯niku]; sometimes also Gorica, German: Büchel, Gottscheerish: Piechl) is a remote almost abandoned settlement in the Municipality of Kočevje in southern Slovenia. The area is part of the traditional region of Lower Carniola and is now included in the Southeast Slovenia Statistical Region.

== Name ==
The name of the settlement was changed from Hrib to Hrib pri Koprivniku (literally, 'hill near Koprivnik') in 1953. Hrib is a common oronym and toponym in Slovenia, derived from the common noun hrib 'hill'. The variant Slovene name Gorica means 'little hill'. The German name Büchel and the Gottscheerish name Piechl semantically correspond to the Slovene names (cf. standard German Bühel 'hill').

== History ==
Hrib pri Koprivniku was a Gottschee German village. It was first settled in the 14th century. In 1574 the village had six full farms divided into 12 half-farms with 24 landowners and 75 to 85 inhabitants. In 1770 there were 32 houses in the villages. Before the Second World War the village had 40 houses and a population of 152. The economy of the village was based on farming, selling beech firewood, charcoal burning, beekeeping, and transporting railway ties to the station in Črnomelj. Italian forces burned all 40 houses in the village in the summer of 1942. In mid-November 1944 the Partisan Fran Levstik Brigade and an assault battalion surrounded and annihilated a detachment of German and Home Guard troops in the village. Today the site of the former village is registered as cultural heritage.

== Church ==
A chapel of ease dedicated to Saint Martin stood in the village. The first church at the site is believed to have dated from the mid-16th century and was described by Johann Weikhard von Valvasor. This was replaced by a pilgrimage church in 1856. The church had an extended nave, an polygonal chancel walled on three sides, and a bell tower above the entrance. It was destroyed in 1955.

== Other cultural heritage ==
In addition to the sites of Saint Martin's Church and the village itself, two other structures in Hrib pri Koprivniku have registered cultural heritage status:

- A rectangular marble plaque on a concrete base marks the grave of seven unknown Partisan soldiers from the Second World War. The memorial was set up in 1979. The grave is located at the crossroads to Koprivnik, Brezovica pri Predgradu, and Črnomelj.
- A stone monument topped by a three-crested shape resembling Mount Triglav with a black marble plaque stands alongside the road through the former village. The monument is dedicated to the Partisan victory over German and Home Guard forces in November 1944. The monument was erected in 1956 and renovated in 1981.
