= Paradiž, Slovenia =

Paradiž
- Location in Slovenia
- Coordinates: 46°19′33.3″N 15°59′54.48″E
- Country: Slovenia
- Traditional region: Styria
- Statistical region: Drava
- Municipality: Cirkulane

Area
  - Total: 2.41 km^{2} (0.93 sq mi)
- Elevation: 320.5 m (1,052 ft)

Population (2020)
  - Total: 180
  - Density: 75/km^{2} (190/sq mi)

Paradiž (pronounced [paɾaˈdiːʃ]) is a settlement in the Municipality of Cirkulane in the Haloze area of eastern Slovenia. It lies in the hills south of Cirkulane towards the border with Croatia. The area is part of the traditional region of Styria. It is now included in the Drava Statistical Region.
