= Meje =

Meje may refer to:

== People ==
- Noluthando Meje (born 1986), South African actress and singer

== Places ==
- Meje, Cirkulane, Slovenia
- Mejë, Kosovo
- Meje, Split, an administrative division of Split, Croatia

== Other ==
- Meje or Mangbetu language
