= Belana =

Belana thereof may refer to:

- a synonym for Vilana, a white Greek wine grape variety
- *Běľana, believed to be the original name of Biljana, a settlement in Slovenia
- Belana Creek, Slovenia - see Pristava, Cirkulane
- Belana, a steamboat that operated in western Washington state - see List of Puget Sound steamboats
- Belana, a character in Sectaurs comic books or books

== See also ==
- B'Elanna Torres, a main character in the TV series Star Trek: Voyager
