= Zaderc =

- Location in Slovenia
- Coordinates: 45°32′47.51″N 15°2′39.79″E
- Country: Slovenia
- Traditional region: Lower Carniola
- Statistical region: Southeast Slovenia
- Municipality: Kočevje
- Elevation: 503.5 m (1,652 ft)

Zaderc (pronounced [ˈzaːdɛɾts]; also Zadrc, German: Saderz) is a former settlement in the Municipality of Kočevje in southern Slovenia. The area is part of the traditional region of Lower Carniola and is now included in the Southeast Slovenia Statistical Region. Its territory is now part of the village of Brezovica pri Predgradu. The Zaderc Spring (Slovene: Zaderški studenec) is located 1 km southwest of Zaderc.

== Name ==
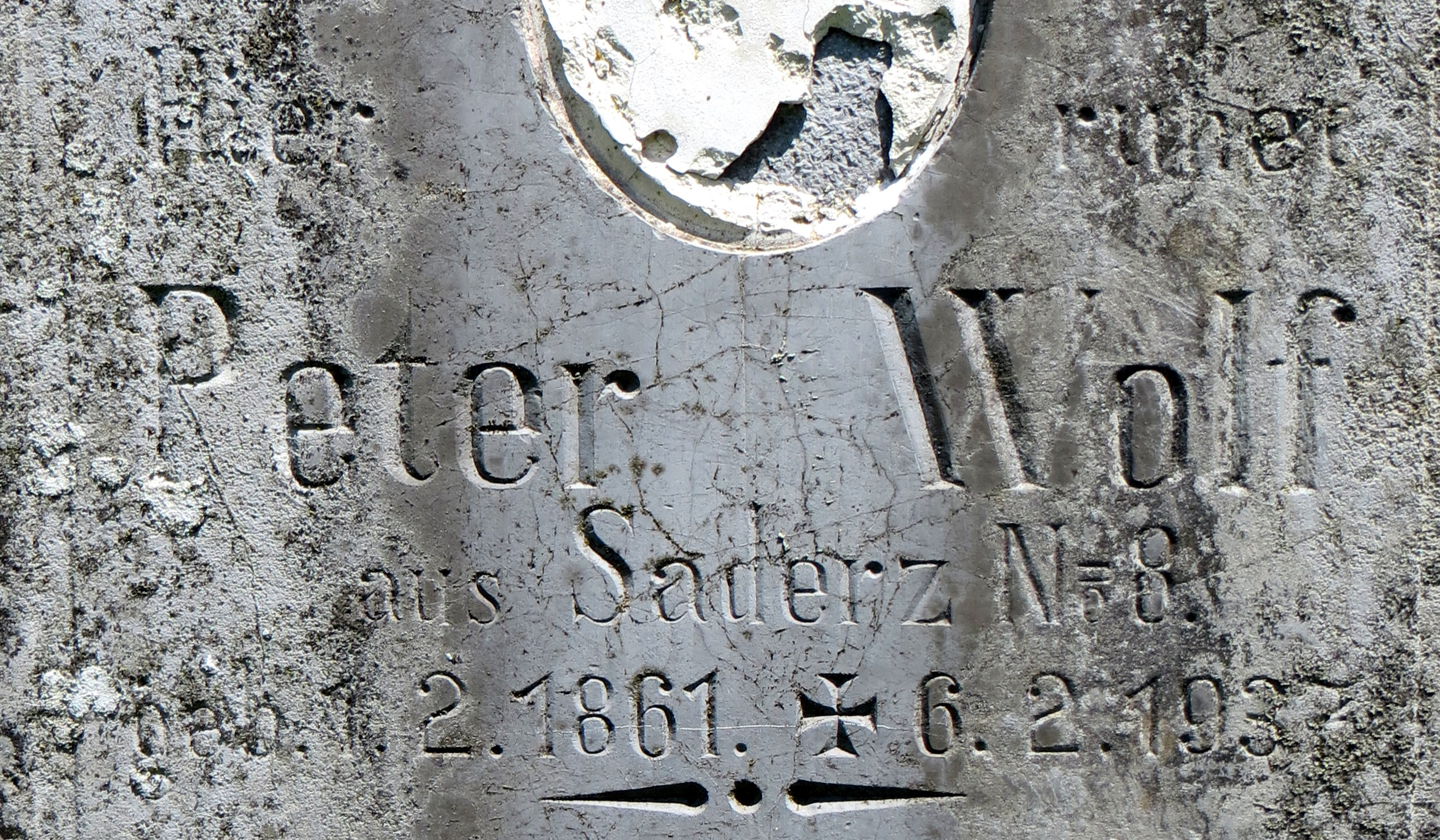
German gravestone inscription with Saderz 'Zaderc'

The origin of the name Zaderc is uncertain; the Slovene linguist France Bezlaj tentatively suggested that it may be a fused prepositional phrase, derived from *za-dorьcь. The German name Saderz is derived from the Slovene name.

== History ==
Zaderc was a village inhabited by Gottschee Germans. Sources vary on whether the village had a Slovene minority or a Slovene majority. A 1936 survey stated that the Slovenes living in Zaderc had been Germanized and were only weakly conscious of their ethnic Slovene identity. Zaderc was not listed in the Gottschee land registry of 1574, in the 1770 census, or in Karl Julius Schröer's 1870 dictionary because it was formerly administratively part of the Dominion of Poljane instead of Gottschee County. The village had three farms in 1576. Before the Second World War, the main activity in the village was farming and peddling, and the village had 15 houses and a population between 33 and 37. The original inhabitants of the village were expelled in October 1941, and the village was later burned. In 1953 it was inhabited by two Roma families (Brajdič and Hudorovac), who worked at the gravel pit at Čeplje.

== Cultural heritage ==
The ruins of a chapel dedicated to Saint Francis Xavier are located in Zaderc. The chapel was destroyed during the Second World War. The ruins are located east of the crossroads in the settlement. The chapel dated from the mid-18th century and had an octagonal altar section walled on three sides and a stone portico. The outer walls of the chapel are preserved as well as the linden tree that stood next to it. The site is heavily overgrown.
