= Pristava, Cirkulane =

Pristava
- Location in Slovenia
- Coordinates: 46°20′30.02″N 15°58′36″E
- Country: Slovenia
- Traditional region: Styria
- Statistical region: Drava
- Municipality: Cirkulane

Area
  - Total: 2.31 km^{2} (0.89 sq mi)
- Elevation: 284.3 m (933 ft)

Population (2020)
  - Total: 214
  - Density: 92.6/km^{2} (240/sq mi)

Pristava (pronounced [ˈpɾiːstaʋa]) is a settlement in the Municipality of Cirkulane in the Haloze area of eastern Slovenia. It lies in the valley of Belana Creek and its tributaries west and southwest of Cirkulane. The area is part of the traditional region of Styria. It is now included in the Drava Statistical Region.
