= Gruškovec =

- Location in Slovenia
- Coordinates: 46°20′16.21″N 16°0′50.91″E
- Country: Slovenia
- Traditional region: Styria
- Statistical region: Drava
- Municipality: Cirkulane

Area
  - Total: 2.65 km^{2} (1.02 sq mi)
- Elevation: 329.4 m (1,081 ft)

Population (2020)
  - Total: 143
  - Density: 54.0/km^{2} (140/sq mi)

Gruškovec (pronounced [ˈɡɾuːʃkɔʋəts]) is a settlement in the Municipality of Cirkulane in the Haloze area of eastern Slovenia, next to the border with Croatia. The area is part of the traditional region of Styria. It is now included in the Drava Statistical Region.

There is a small simple chapel-shrine in the settlement. It was built in the early 20th century.
