= Borl Castle =

Castle in Eastern Slovenia

Coordinates: 46.3748°N 16.0030°E

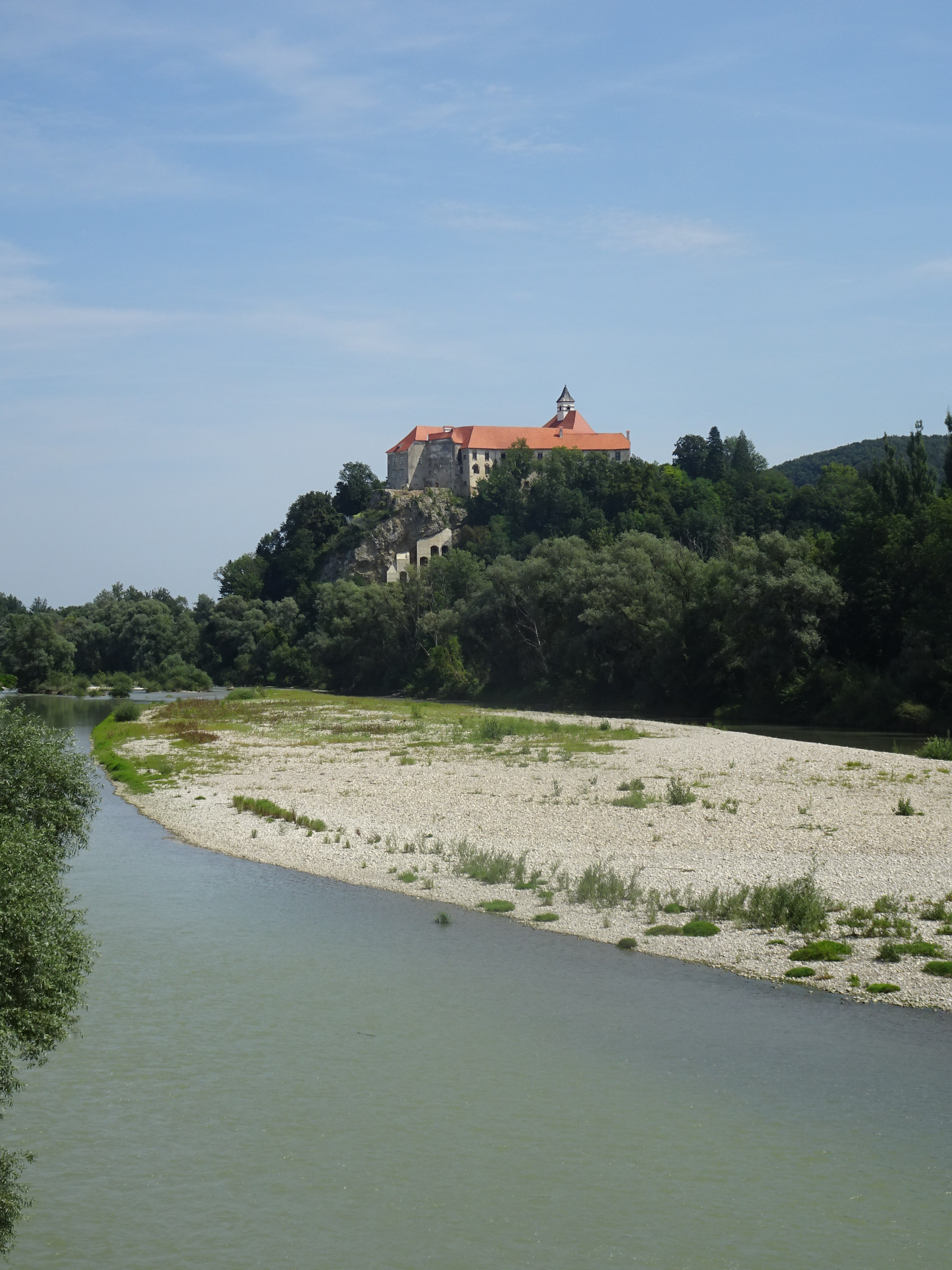
Borl Castle on a hillock above the Drava River (2021)

Borl Castle (German: Ankenstein) is a medieval castle above the banks of the Drava, northeast of the main settlement in Dolane, Slovenia. It probably dates to the 12th century,w ith 15th- and 17th-century additions. Some wall paintings, sculpture, and internal furnishings survive. During the Second World War, between 1941 and 1943, it served as a Gestapo prison. At first the stables and later the main building were used to imprison, interrogate, and torture suspects. In 1956, a memorial room was opened and a commemorative plaque unveiled. It is protected as a cultural monument of national significance.
