= Stari Tabor =

- Location in Slovenia
- Coordinates: 45°38′50.31″N 15°6′50.56″E
- Country: Slovenia
- Traditional region: Lower Carniola
- Statistical region: Southeast Slovenia
- Municipality: Semič
- Elevation: 625.1 m (2,051 ft)

Population (2002)
  - Total: none

Stari Tabor (pronounced [ˈstaːɾi ˈtaːbɔɾ]; German: Alttabor, Gottscheerish: Autrtawr or Aotrtawr) is a remote abandoned settlement in the Municipality of Semič in southern Slovenia. The area is part of the traditional region of Lower Carniola and is now included in the Southeast Slovenia Statistical Region. Its territory is now part of the village of Brezovica pri Črmošnjicah.

== Geography ==
Stari Tabor was located on a slope above the Črmošnjica Valley south of Brezovica pri Črmošnjicah, ranging in elevation between 606 and 620 meters. There is a spring near the site of the village.

== Name ==
The German name of the village, Alttabor, semantically corresponds to Slovene Stari Tabor, literally 'old fortified camp'. Tabor 'fortified camp' is a relatively common element in Slovene place names and refers to a fortified area, usually on a hilltop but sometimes also narrow valleys or cliffs with caves, where the population could withdraw to shelter from Ottoman raids. The word tabor itself was borrowed into Slovene partially via German (cf. late Middle High German taber), but is ultimately of Turkish origin, from tabur 'battalion (prepared for defense)' (cf. also Chagatai tapkur 'fortress'). Some scholars have characterized the German name Alttabor as a Slovene-German hybrid.

== History ==
Stari Tabor was not yet mentioned in the land registry of 1574, and so it probably developed later as a settlement founded under the Counts of Blagay. The village developed from a fortified camp built as protection against Ottoman raids. An 18th-century military map mentions only a deteriorating fortification at the site. In 1770 it had nine houses, but only one by 1931. The village reached its peak population of 43 in 1880, but by 1921 it no longer had any permanent residents. In 1936 five of the six houses in the village were in ruins, and a German family of five was living in one house. The remaining six inhabitants—the Johann Tramposch family—were evicted from the village on 10 December 1941; the sole house was burned by Italian troops during the Rog Offensive in August 1942. The entire site of the former village is registered as cultural heritage. The ruins of two structures remain.
