= Gradišča =

- Location in Slovenia
- Coordinates: 46°21′28.14″N 15°58′19.73″E
- Country: Slovenia
- Traditional region: Styria
- Statistical region: Drava
- Municipality: Cirkulane

Area
  - Total: 4.78 km^{2} (1.85 sq mi)
- Elevation: 308.1 m (1,011 ft)

Population (2020)
  - Total: 346

Gradišča (pronounced [ˈɡɾaːdiʃtʃa]) is a settlement in the hills above the right bank of the Drava River in the Municipality of Cirkulane in the Haloze area of eastern Slovenia. The area is part of the traditional region of Styria. It is now included in the Drava Statistical Region.

There is a small chapel-shrine in the settlement. It was built in the early 20th century.
