= Veliki Vrh, Cirkulane =

Veliki Vrh
- Location in Slovenia
- Coordinates: 46°22′6.11″N 16°0′40.31″E
- Country: Slovenia
- Traditional region: Styria
- Statistical region: Drava
- Municipality: Cirkulane

Area
  - Total: 2.71 km^{2} (1.05 sq mi)
- Elevation: 333.2 m (1,093 ft)

Population (2020)
  - Total: 127
  - Density: 46.9/km^{2} (121/sq mi)

Veliki Vrh (pronounced [ˈʋeːliki ˈʋəɾx], German: Großberg) is a settlement in the Municipality of Cirkulane in the Haloze area of eastern Slovenia. It lies in the hills above the right bank of the Drava River. The area is part of the traditional region of Styria. It is now included in the Drava Statistical Region.

The local church is dedicated to Saint Anne and belongs to the Parish of Cirkulane. It was built in the late 17th century.
