= Meje, Cirkulane =

Meje
- Location in Slovenia
- Coordinates: 46°19′9.1″N 16°0′58.08″E
- Country: Slovenia
- Traditional region: Styria
- Statistical region: Drava
- Municipality: Cirkulane

Area
  - Total: 0.63 km^{2} (0.24 sq mi)
- Elevation: 328.6 m (1,078 ft)

Population (2020)
  - Total: 56
  - Density: 89/km^{2} (230/sq mi)

Meje (pronounced [ˈmɛːjɛ]) is a small settlement in the Municipality of Cirkulane in the Haloze area of eastern Slovenia. It lies at the top end of the valley of Belica Creek south of Cirkulane, right on the border with Croatia. The area is part of the traditional region of Styria. It is now included in the Drava Statistical Region.
