= Dolane =

- Location in Slovenia
- Coordinates: 46°21′50″N 15°59′58″E
- Country: Slovenia
- Traditional region: Styria
- Statistical region: Drava
- Municipality: Cirkulane

Area
  - Total: 2.34 km^{2} (0.90 sq mi)
- Elevation: 212.7 m (698 ft)

Population (2020)
  - Total: 160
  - Density: 68/km^{2} (180/sq mi)

Dolane (pronounced [dɔˈlaːnɛ], German: Dollendorf) is a settlement on the right bank of the Drava River in the Municipality of Cirkulane in the Haloze area of eastern Slovenia. The area is part of the traditional region of Styria. It is now included in the Drava Statistical Region.

== Cultural heritage ==
Borl Castle is located northeast of the main settlement in Dolane.
