= Rakitna, Brezovica =

Rakitna
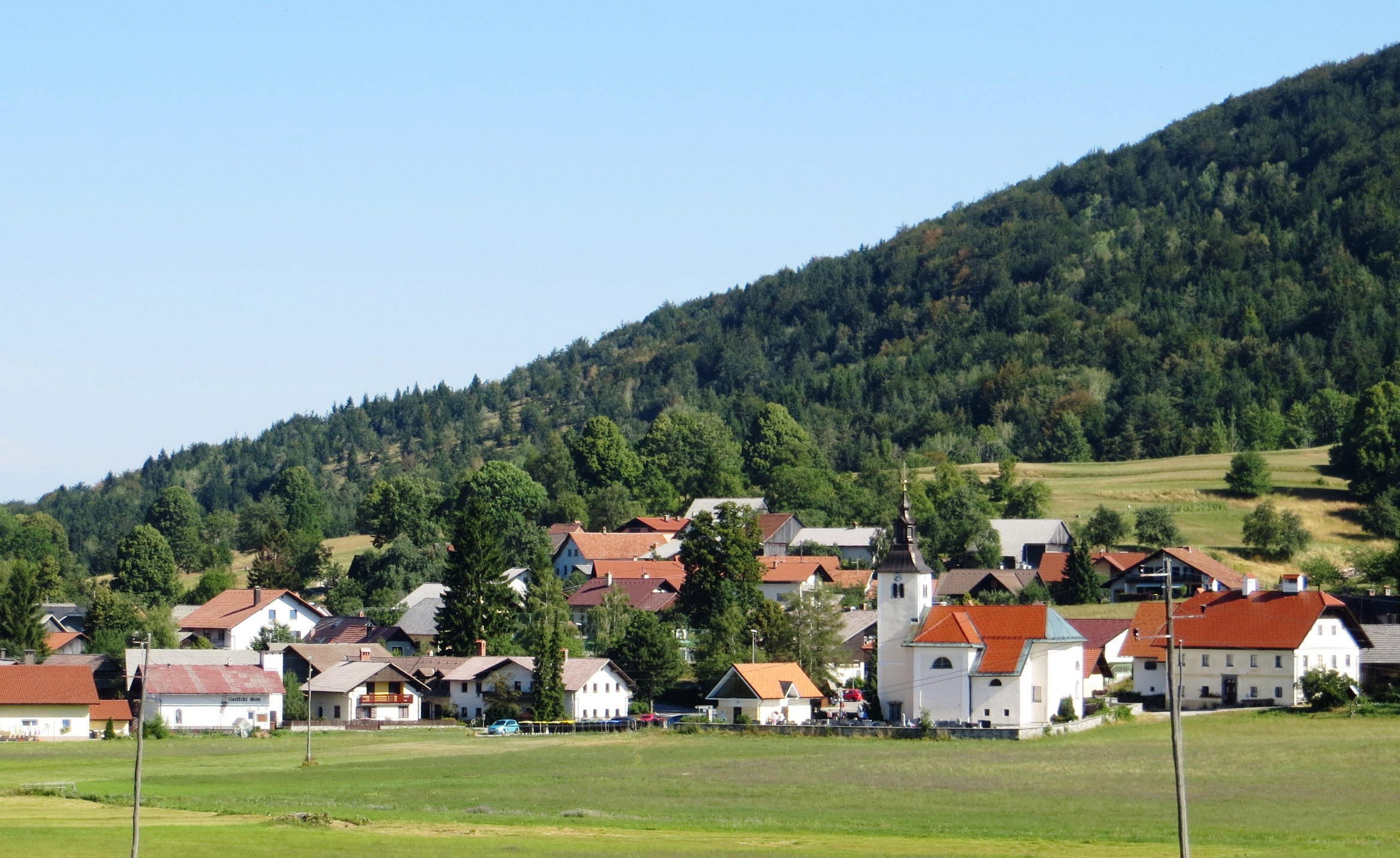

- Location in Slovenia
- Coordinates: 45°53′31.87″N 14°26′21.59″E
- Country: Slovenia
- Traditional region: Inner Carniola
- Statistical region: Central Slovenia
- Municipality: Brezovica

Area
  - Total: 20.98 km^{2} (8.10 sq mi)
- Elevation: 796.3 m (2,613 ft)

Population (2020)
  - Total: 709
  - Density: 33.8/km^{2} (87.5/sq mi)
- Postal code: 1352

Rakitna (pronounced [ɾaˈkiːtna]) is a village and tourist resort in the Municipality of Brezovica in central Slovenia. The municipality is part of the traditional region of Inner Carniola and is now included in the Central Slovenia Statistical Region. Rakitna includes the hamlets of Na Klancu, Hudi Konec, Hrib, Boršt, Nakličev Konec, Podgora, Jezero, Novaki, Žobov Grič, Pri Cajzli, and Zakotkar.

== Name ==
Rakitna was attested in written sources in 1265 as Raquitina (and as Rachitten in 1415 and Raczkitnichk in 1420). The name is a clipped adjectival form, shortened from *Rakitna vas (i.e., 'Rakitna village'). The adjective rakitna comes from the Slovene common noun rakita 'eared willow', and so the name literally means '(village of the) eared willow', thus referring to the local vegetation.

== History ==
Rakitna was along the route of the Roman road from Cerknica to Emona and from Čušperk to Lužarji. A barrier known as the "pagan wall" (Slovene: ajdovski zid) was built to protect the road, closing off the valley between Mount Novaki (Slovene: Novaška gora, 998 m) and Avšnik Hill (930 m). A school was established in Rakitna in 1903. The schoolhouse was burned in 1943 during the Second World War.

== Church ==
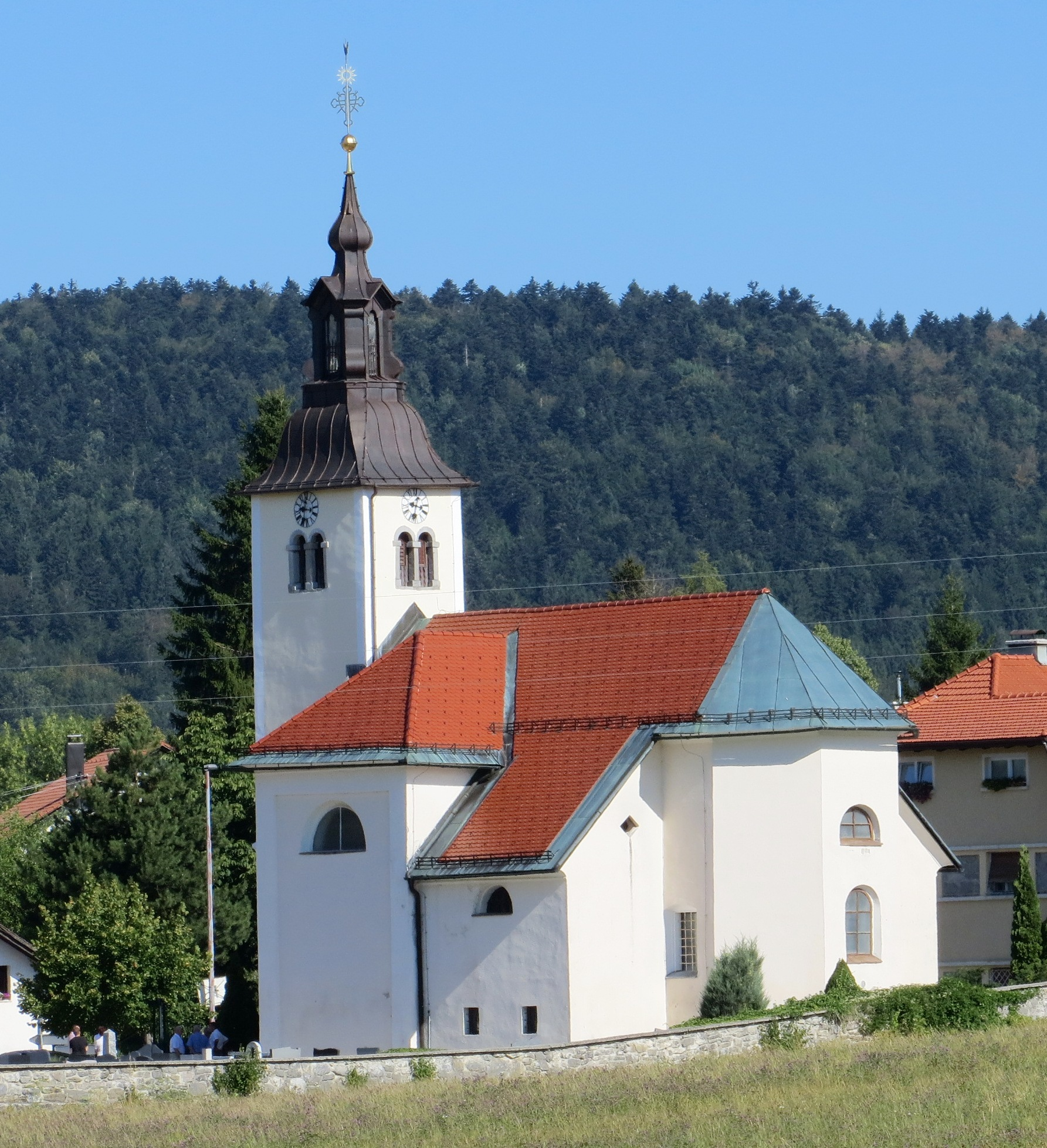
Holy Cross Church

The local parish church is dedicated to the Holy Cross and belongs to the Roman Catholic Archdiocese of Ljubljana. It was built in the 17th century on the site of an earlier building, mentioned in written documents dating to 1420. The year 1677 is carved into the door casing of the church. The main altar and the side altar dedicated to Saint Martin are said to have been brought from Bistra; they are marble works dating from the end of the 17th century. The main altar painting is the work of Henrika Langus (1836–1876). The church was elevated to the seat of a parish in 1766.

== Natural monuments ==
The Brinar fir (Slovene: Brinarjeva jelka) was a mutant European silver fir that grew in the Zagabrnice Woods on the southwest slope of Mount Novaki (Slovene: Novaška gora), about 1.5 kilometers (0.93 mi) southwest of Rakitna. The tree was studied by the forestry researcher Miran Brinar (1909–2002), after whom it was named. The tree started growing c. 1890 and was characterized by an unusual columnar crown and markedly shorter, wider, and denser needles with a denser distribution of stomata. It also had a significantly faster rate of growth than surrounding firs and produced cones annually rather than every two to three years. The tree was felled by an unknown vandal in July 2016. At the time it was felled, it was still growing vigorously and had a height of 40.5 meters (133 ft) and circumference of 243 centimeters (96 in).

== Notable people ==
Notable people that were born or lived in Rakitna include:

- Anton Kržič (1846–1920), religious writer, journalist, and editor
