= Municipality of Cirkulane =

Municipality of Slovenia

Municipality of Cirkulane Občina Cirkulane
- Municipality
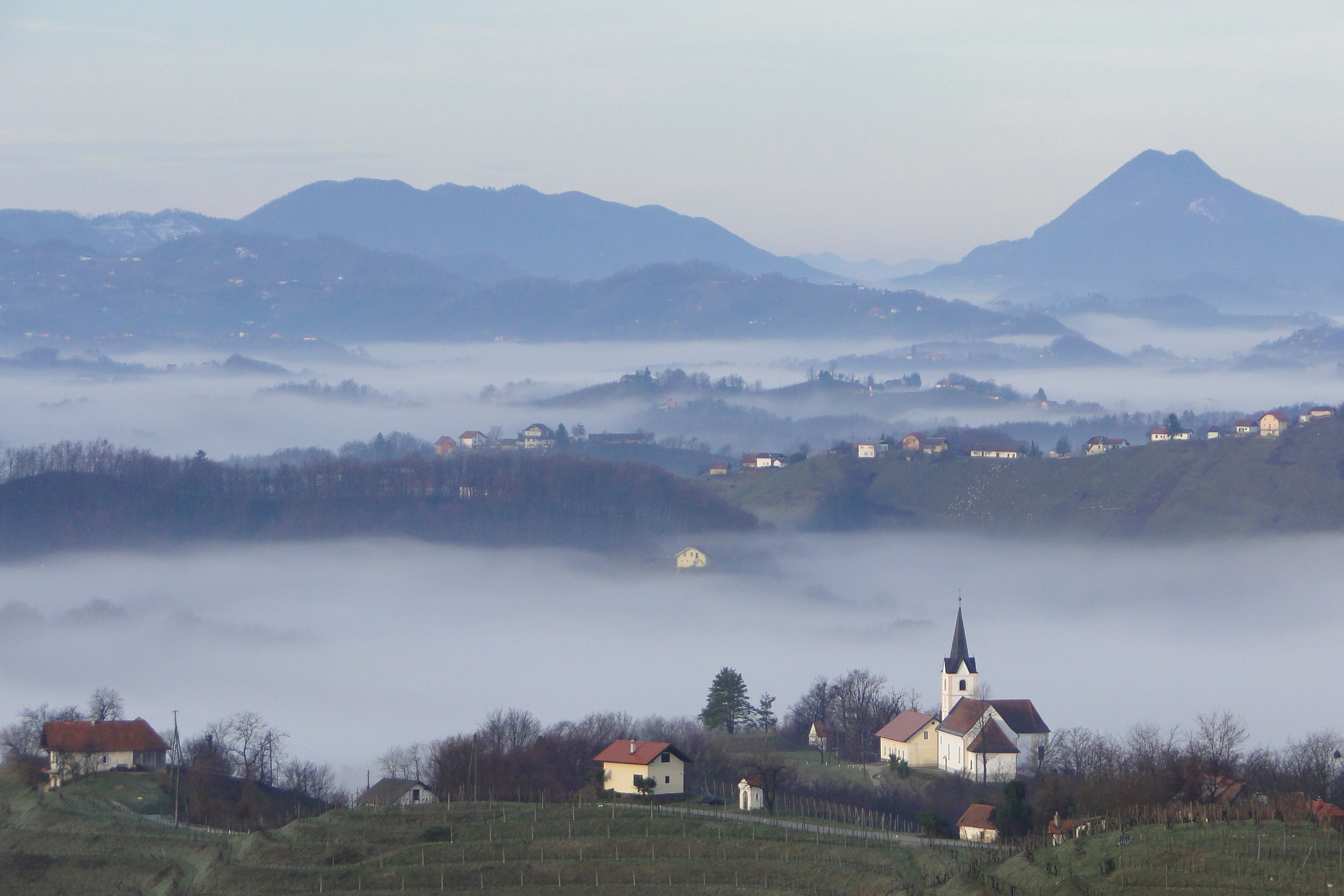

- Location of the Municipality of Cirkulane in Slovenia
- Coordinates: 46°21′N 16°00′E
- Country: Slovenia

Government
  - Mayor: Janez Jurgec (Independent)

Area
  - Total: 32.07 km^{2} (12.38 sq mi)

Population (2002)
  - Total: 2,300
  - Density: 72/km^{2} (190/sq mi)
- Time zone: UTC+01 (CET)
  - Summer (DST): UTC+02 (CEST)
- Website: www.cirkulane.si

The Municipality of Cirkulane (pronounced [tsiɾkuˈlaːnɛ]; Slovene: Občina Cirkulane) is a municipality in the Haloze area of Slovenia. The seat of the municipality is the settlement of Cirkulane. The municipality lies between the right bank of the Drava River and the border with Croatia. The area belongs to the traditional region of Styria. It is now included in the Drava Statistical Region.

== Settlements ==
In addition to the municipal seat of Cirkulane, the municipality also includes the following settlements:

- Brezovec
- Dolane
- Gradišča
- Gruškovec
- Mali Okič
- Medribnik
- Meje
- Paradiž
- Pohorje
- Pristava
- Slatina
- Veliki Vrh
