= Knežja Lipa =

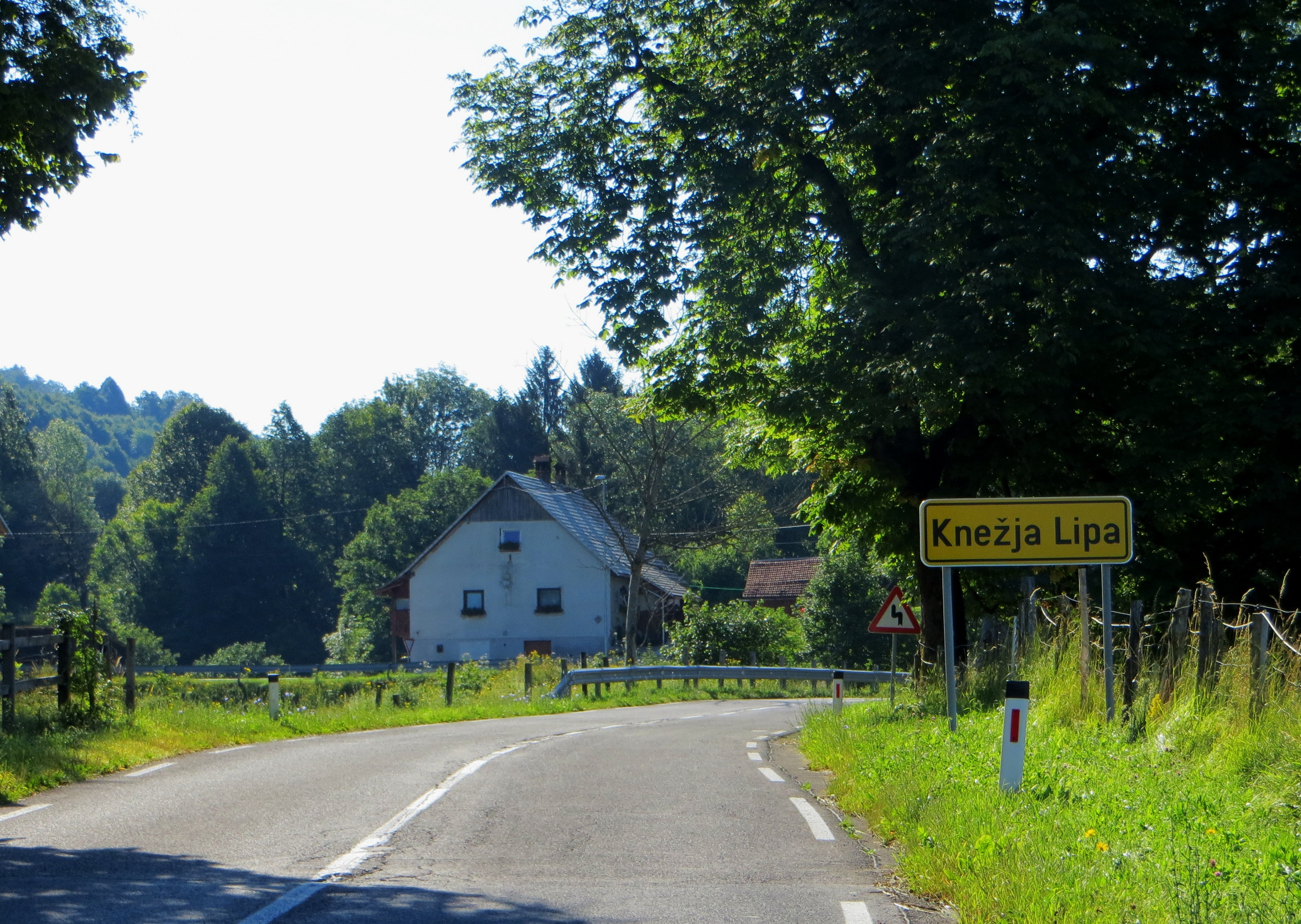

- Location in Slovenia
- Coordinates: 45°33′1.3″N 15°0′33.12″E
- Country: Slovenia
- Traditional region: Lower Carniola
- Statistical region: Southeast Slovenia
- Municipality: Kočevje

Area
  - Total: 21.1 km^{2} (8.1 sq mi)
- Elevation: 535.7 m (1,758 ft)

Population (2002)
  - Total: 26
- Postal code: 1330

Knežja Lipa (pronounced [ˈkneːʒja ˈliːpa]; German: Graflinden, Gottscheerish: pei dər Lintən) is a settlement southeast of Kočevje in southern Slovenia.

== Geography ==
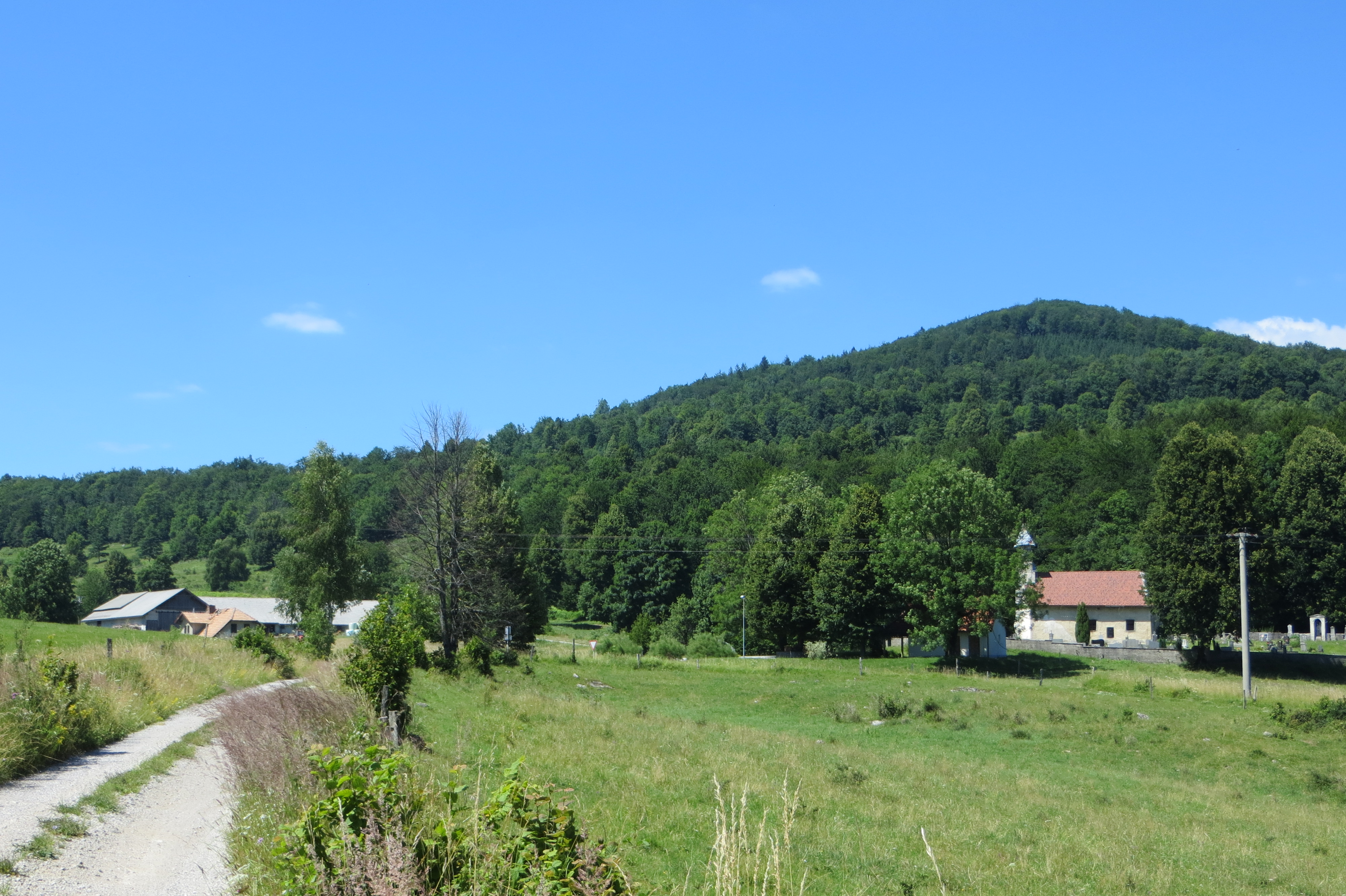
The hamlet of Videm

Knežja Lipa stands below the north slope of Mount Spodnji Log (Slovene: Spodnjeloška gora, rising to 860 meters or 2,820 feet). Šiša Hill (680 meters or 2,230 feet) rises to the north and Straža Hill (834 meters or 2,736 feet) to the northeast. The area is part of the traditional region of Lower Carniola and is now included in the Southeast Slovenia Statistical Region. The settlement includes the hamlets of Videm (German: Wieden) and Studeno.

== Name ==
The name of the settlement was first attested as Grauenlynnd in 1457. The Slovene name Knežja Lipa and German name Graflinden are semantically identical, both meaning 'nobleman's linden tree' (cf. Slovene knez 'prince, duke, lord', German Graf 'count, earl'). The Gottscheerish name pei dər Lintən means 'at the linden tree'. According to local tradition, a nobleman once resided in the area. Other explanations connect the name with freeholders (i.e., non-vassals) that had hereditary rights to the land.

== History ==
Knežja Lipa was a Gottschee German settlement. In the land registry of 1574 it had six and a half full farms subdivided into 13 half-farms, corresponding to a population between 90 and 100. In the 1770 census it had 27 houses. During the period of the Illyrian Provinces (1809–1814) a French officer was murdered in Knežja Lipa and buried in the Franzosengrube ('French grave') in the village; the village head (Gottscheerish: Suppan) was punished for the killing by having his house repeatedly burned. Before the Second World War, the village had 29 houses and a population of 122. The 93 German residents were evicted from the village on 27 November 1941, and most of the village was burned by Italian troops in the summer of 1942. Resettlement of the village after the war was meager. A small primary school, a branch of the Kočevje school, operated in the village from 1961 to 1974.

=== Mass grave ===
Knežja Lipa is the site of a mass grave associated with the Second World War. The Upper Videm Mass Grave (Slovene: Grobišče nad Vidmom) lies in the woods above the church in the hamlet of Videm and contains the remains of unidentified victims.

== Church ==
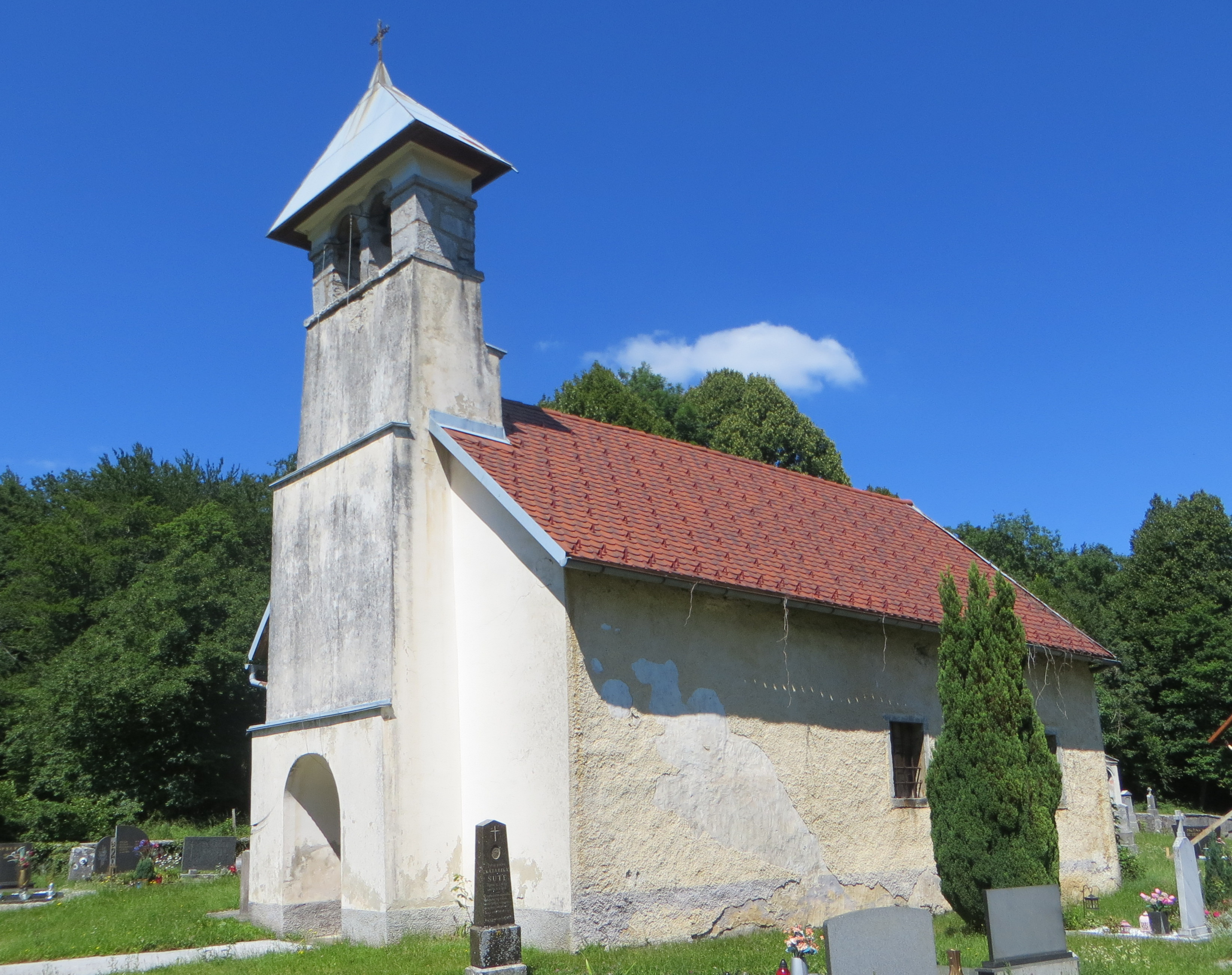
Saint Nicholas's Church in Videm

The medieval church in the settlement was a chapel of ease dedicated to the Holy Trinity. It is believed to have dated from the mid-17th century and it was mentioned in written records dating to 1667. The bell tower was probably added to the building around 1790, when the bells (which were removed during the First World War) were cast. The bell tower was damaged in a lightning strike during the interwar period. The church was burned during the Italian offensive of 1942 and never rebuilt. The church is surrounded by an abandoned cemetery that was created in 1824. In 2002 there were 13 grave markers at the site.

A second church southeast of the main settlement, in the hamlet of Videm, is dedicated to Saint Nicholas and was restored in the 1980s. Some 16th-century frescos have survived on the interior arch and sanctuary.
