= Lužarji =

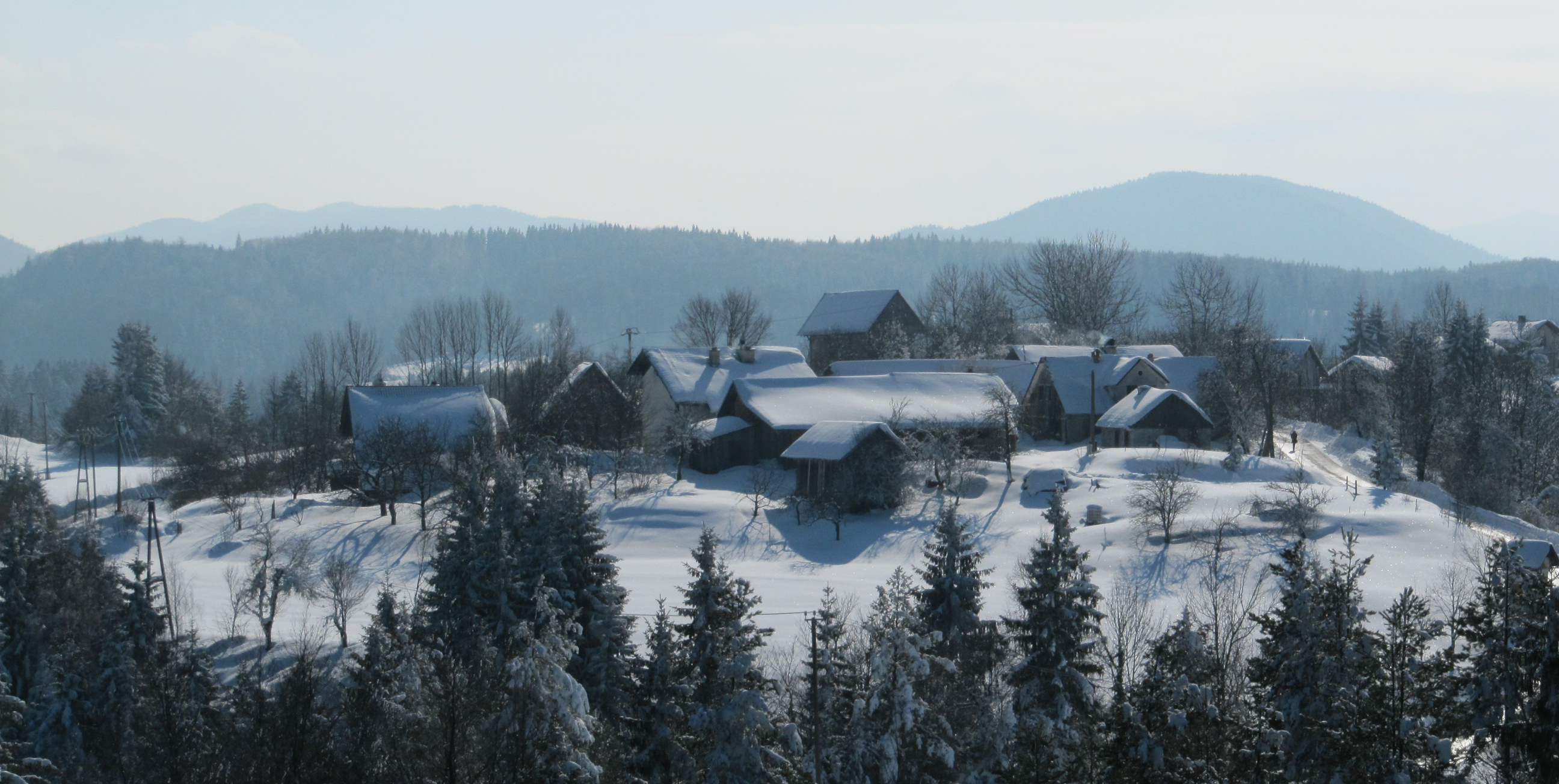

- Location in Slovenia
- Coordinates: 45°48′12.38″N 14°33′23.94″E
- Country: Slovenia
- Traditional region: Lower Carniola
- Statistical region: Central Slovenia
- Municipality: Velike Lašče

Area
  - Total: 1.2 km^{2} (0.46 sq mi)
- Elevation: 787.3 m (2,583 ft)

Population (2002)
  - Total: 20
- Postal code: 1385

Lužarji (pronounced [ˈluːʒaɾji]; German: Luschari) is a small village in the hills southwest of Velike Lašče in central Slovenia. The entire Municipality of Velike Lašče is part of the traditional region of Lower Carniola and is now included in the Central Slovenia Statistical Region.

== Name ==
The name Lužarji is a collective toponym, referring to a settlement where several people with the surname Lužar lived.

== Church ==
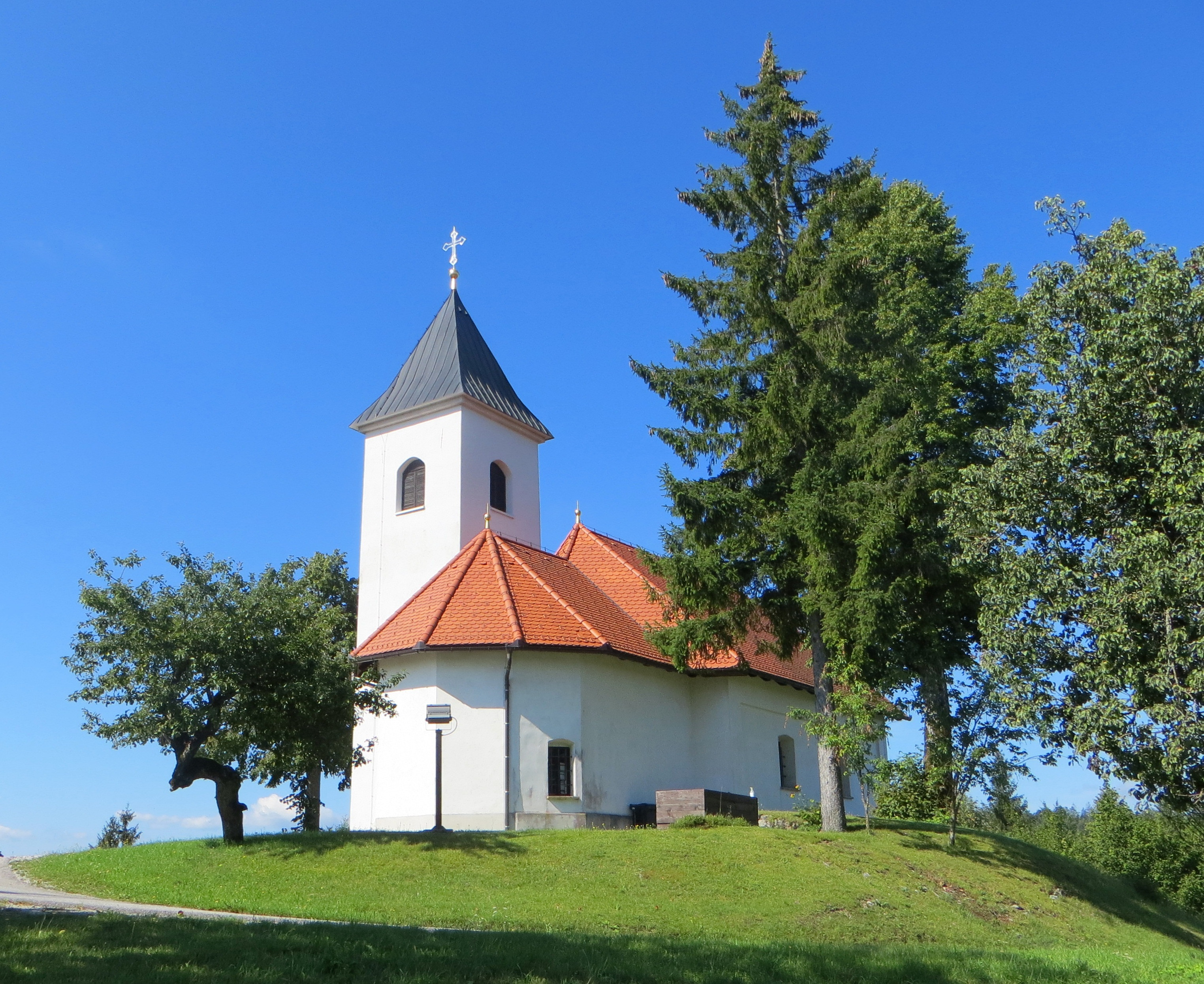
Saint Oswald's Church

The local church, built outside the settlement to the north, is dedicated to Saint Oswald and belongs to the Parish of Velike Lašče. It is a medieval building that was thoroughly rebuilt in the mid-18th century. The church was burned during the Second World War, at Christmas 1942. After the war, there was political opposition in Yugoslavia to restoring the church. It was restored in the 1980s and was consecrated by Bishop Stanislav Lenič on August 1, 1982.
