= Čušperk =

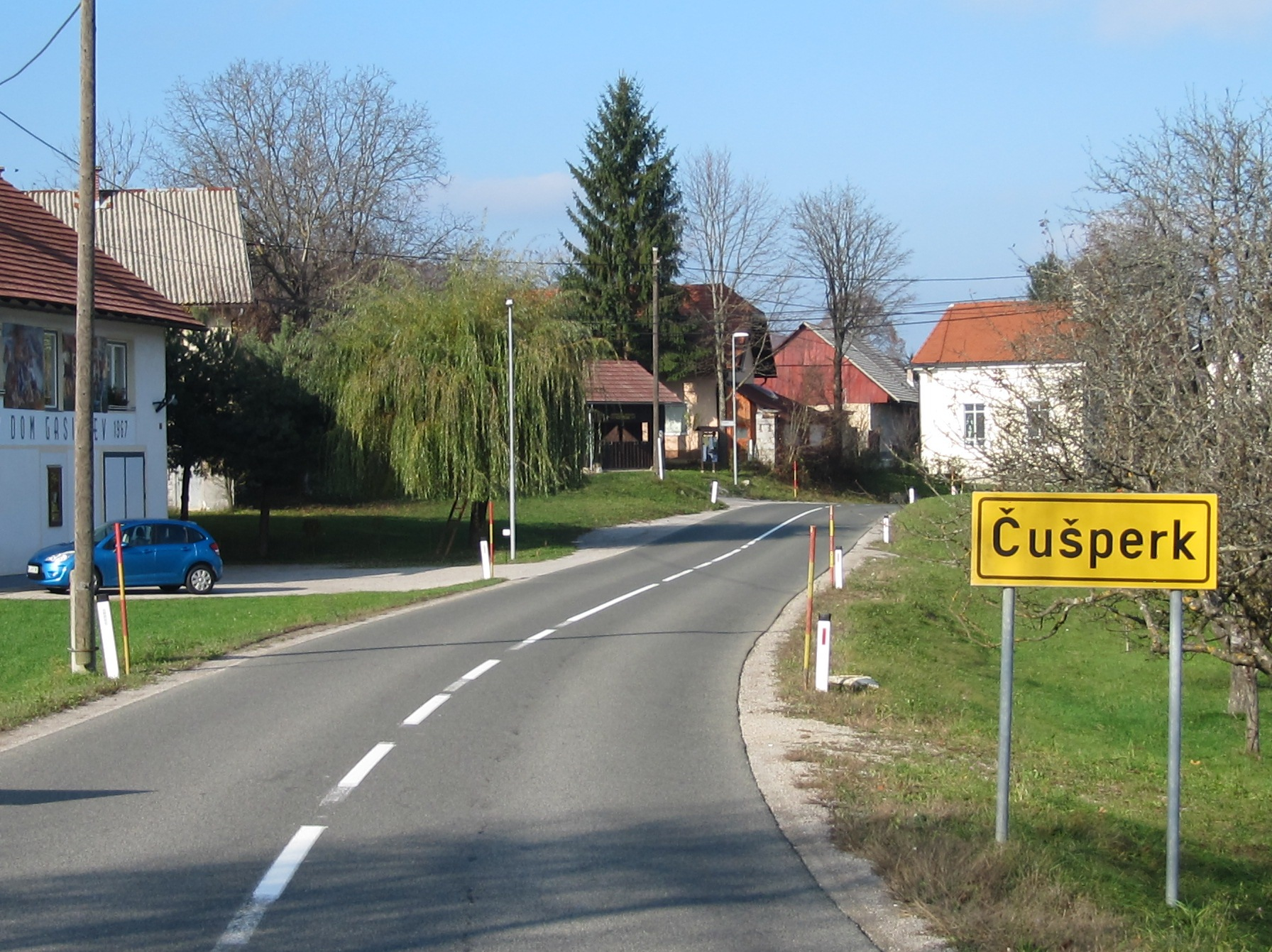

- Location in Slovenia
- Coordinates: 45°53′30.53″N 14°41′59.58″E
- Country: Slovenia
- Traditional region: Lower Carniola
- Statistical region: Central Slovenia
- Municipality: Grosuplje

Area
  - Total: 2.76 km^{2} (1.07 sq mi)
- Elevation: 404.6 m (1,327 ft)

Population (2002)
  - Total: 190

Čušperk (pronounced [ˈtʃuːʃpɛɾk]; German: Zobelsberg) is a village in the Municipality of Grosuplje in central Slovenia. It lies in the hills south of Grosuplje in the historical region of Lower Carniola. The municipality is now included in the Central Slovenia Statistical Region.

== Name ==
Čušperk was first attested in written sources in 1220 as Czobelsperch (and as castrum Zobelsperc in 1248 and Zusperch in 1400, among other variations). The name originally referred to the castle located at the site and, based on medieval sources, is derived from Middle High German Zobelsberc, a compound of zobel 'sable' + berc 'mountain'.

== Čušperk Castle ==
Čušperk was the location of 12th-century Čušperk Castle (Slovene: Čušperški grad, German: Zobelsberg), also known locally as Old Castle (Slovene: Stari grad). The castle was built on top the foundations of a prehistoric fortification and was first mentioned in written sources in 1248. The castle's ownership was taken over by the Counts of Celje from the Counts of Ortenburg in 1418, after which ownership passed to the Habsburgs in 1456. A provincial court with the authority to impose the death penalty was established at the castle in 1457. Emperor Frederick III pledged the castle to the Auerspergs in exchange for Kostanjevica na Krki. The castle was badly damaged in the peasant uprisings of 1515 and 1573, and so the Auerspergs built a new manor along the road in place of the castle. This was taken over by the Barbo family in 1658, but repurchased by the Auerspergs in 1691, who sold the property in 1789, after which it changes hands several times. Baroness Rechbach purchased the castle in 1915, and during the interwar period it was owned by the merchant and inn owner Ivan Šteh from Videm. The Partisans burned the castle on 18 December 1943.

== Chapel ==
A chapel in the village was built by the Lords of Čušperk Castle in 1742.

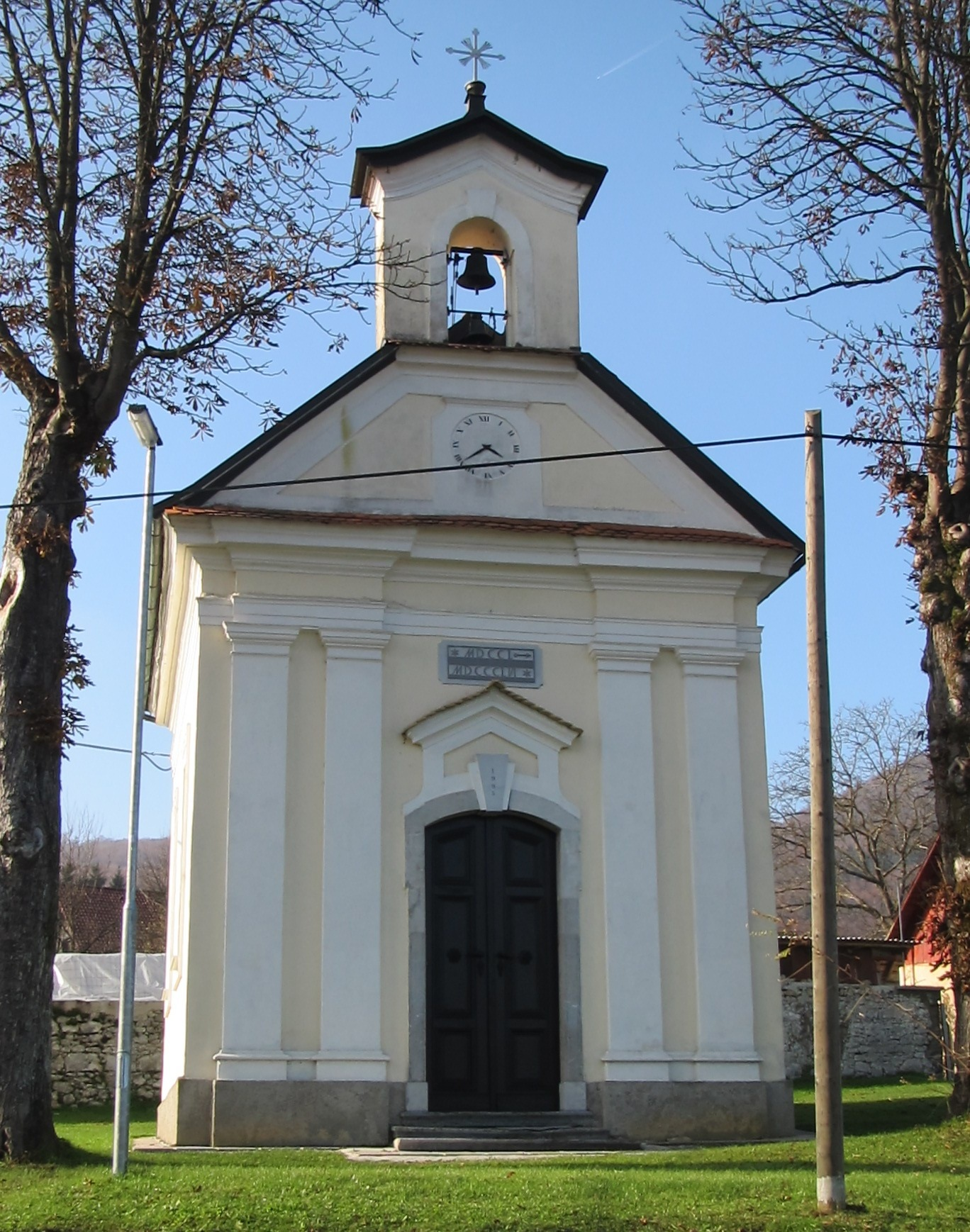
Chapel in Čušperk
