= Tirna =

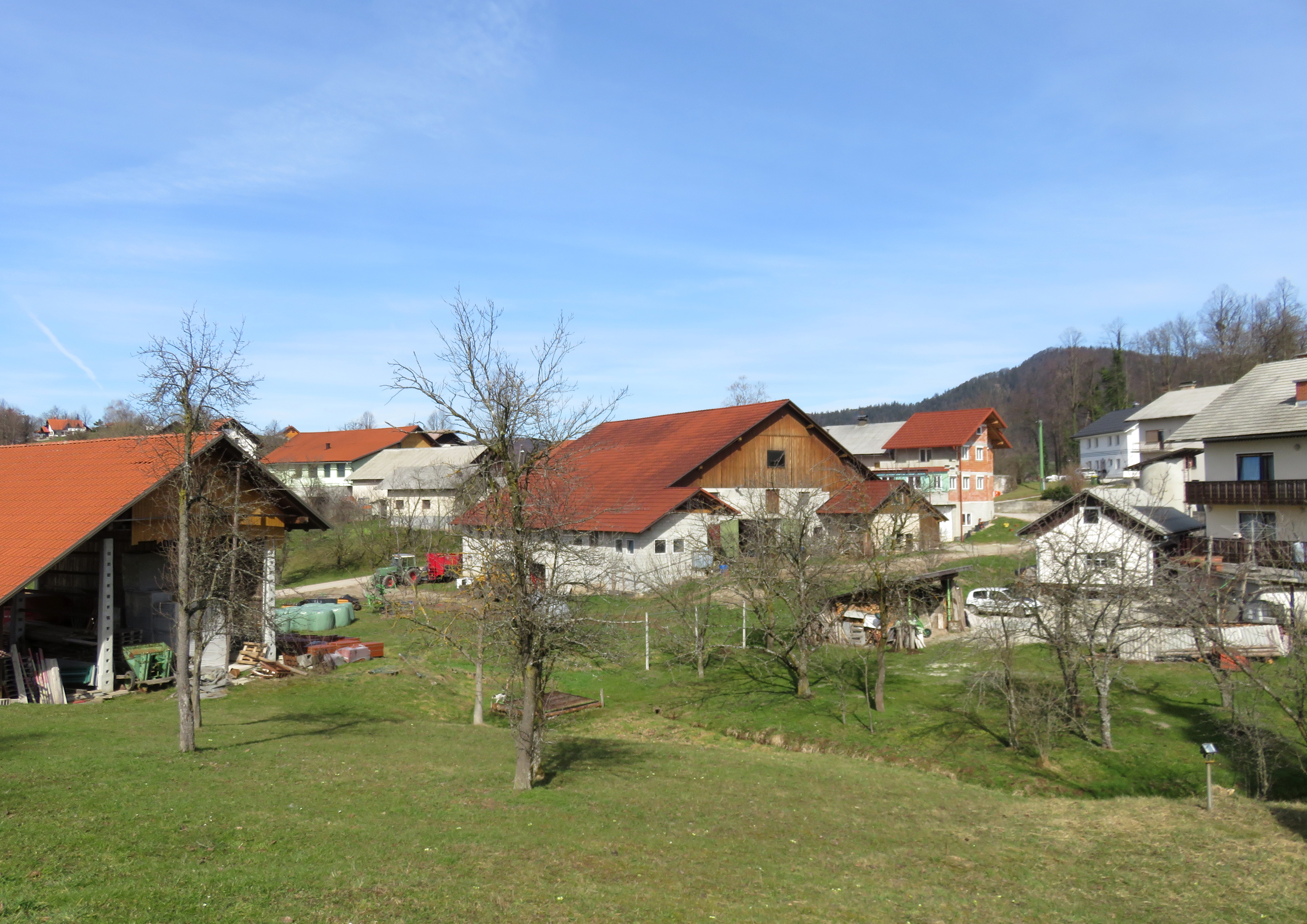

- Location in Slovenia
- Coordinates: 46°6′15.92″N 14°54′25.65″E
- Country: Slovenia
- Traditional region: Upper Carniola
- Statistical region: Central Sava
- Municipality: Zagorje ob Savi

Area
  - Total: 4.97 km^{2} (1.92 sq mi)
- Elevation: 599.6 m (1,967 ft)

Population (2002)
  - Total: 155
- Postal code: 1282

Tirna (pronounced [ˈtiːɾna]) is a settlement west of Šentlambert in the Municipality of Zagorje ob Savi in central Slovenia. Its territory extends southwards right to the left bank of the Sava River. The area is part of the traditional region of Upper Carniola. It is now included with the rest of the municipality in the Central Sava Statistical Region.

== Church ==
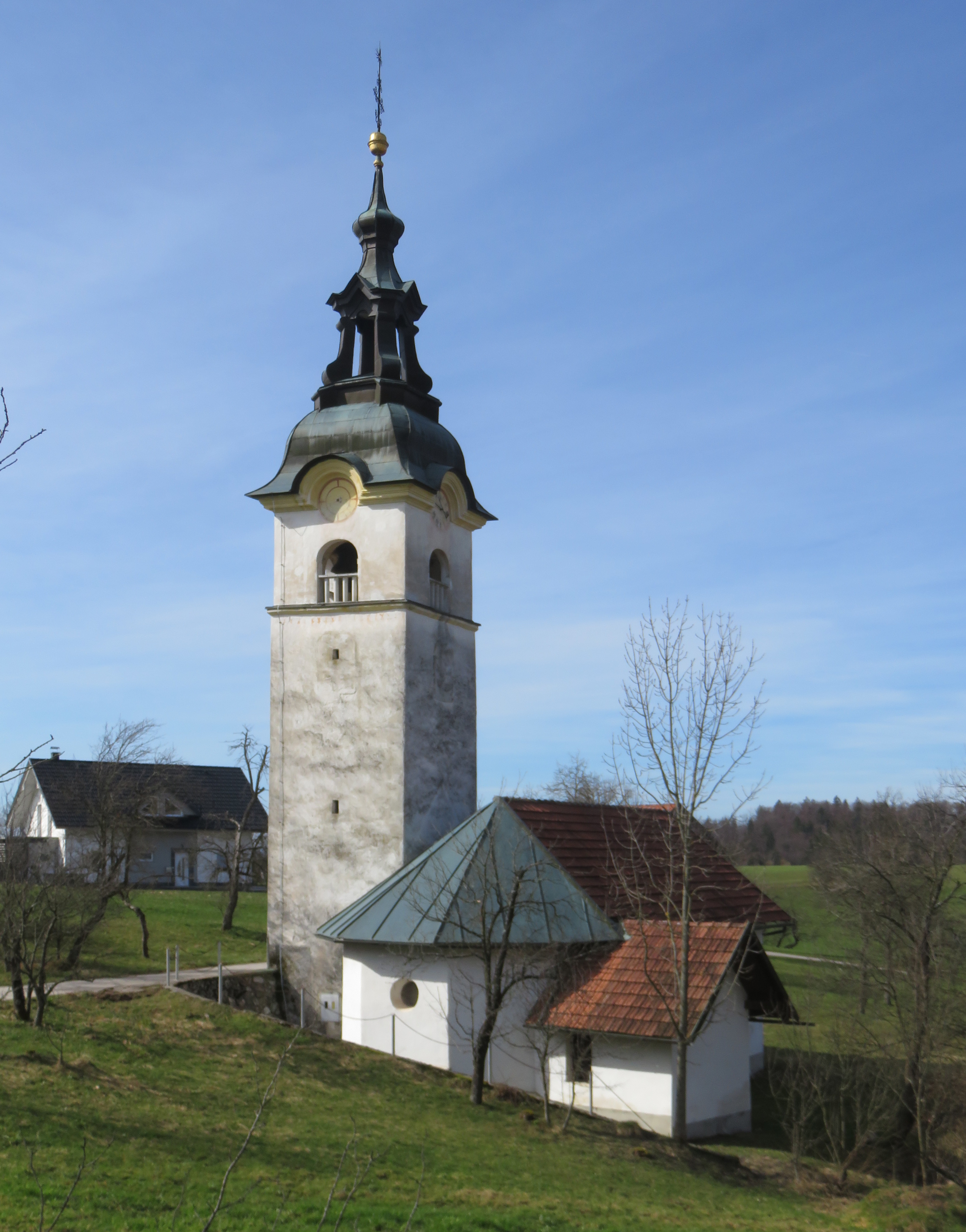
Saints Primus and Felician Church

The local church is dedicated to Saints Primus and Felician and belongs to the Parish of Sveta Gora. It is a 16th-century building that was expanded in the 19th century.

== Mass grave ==
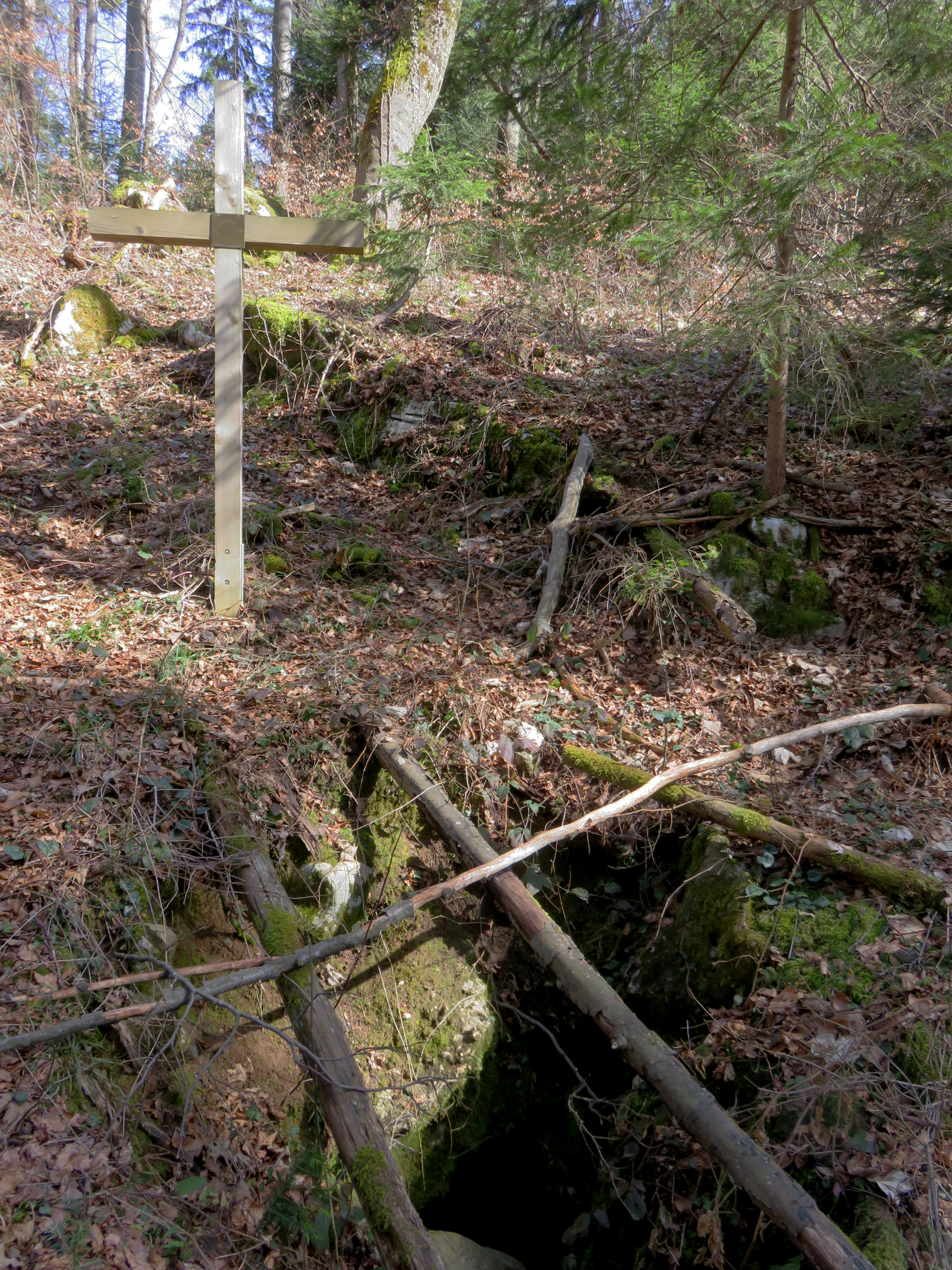
The Blaž Cave Mass Grave

Tirna is the site of a mass grave from the period immediately after the Second World War. The Blaž Cave Mass Grave (Slovene: Grobišče Blažetova jama) is located about 1 kilometer (0.62 mi) west of the settlement, along a forest road. It contains the remains of about 150 Slovene civilians from the prison in Litija that were murdered here in May, June, and July 1945. The cave is 45 metres (148 ft) deep.
