= Brezovec, Cirkulane =

Brezovec
- Location in Slovenia
- Coordinates: 46°21′0.95″N 16°1′22.61″E
- Country: Slovenia
- Traditional region: Styria
- Statistical region: Drava
- Municipality: Cirkulane

Area
  - Total: 3.32 km^{2} (1.28 sq mi)
- Elevation: 266.4 m (874 ft)

Population (2020)
  - Total: 223
  - Density: 67.2/km^{2} (174/sq mi)

Brezovec (pronounced [ˈbɾeːzɔʋəts], German: Bresovetz) is a settlement in the Municipality of Cirkulane in the Haloze area of eastern Slovenia. The area is part of the traditional region of Styria. It is now included in the Drava Statistical Region.
