= Brezovica (Ub) =

Brezovica Брезовица
- Village (Selo)
- Location within Serbia
- Coordinates: 44°29′N 19°58′E
- Country: Serbia
- District: Kolubara District
- Municipality: Ub

Area
  - Total: 12.25 km^{2} (4.73 sq mi)
- Elevation: 96 m (315 ft)

Population (2011)
  - Total: 604
  - Density: 49.3/km^{2} (128/sq mi)
- Time zone: UTC+1 (CET)
  - Summer (DST): UTC+2 (CEST)

Brezovica is a village in the municipality of Ub, Serbia. According to the 2011 census, the village has a population of 604 people.
