= Brezova, Celje =

Brezova
- Location in Slovenia
- Coordinates: 46°17′37.41″N 15°15′52.3″E
- Country: Slovenia
- Traditional region: Styria
- Statistical region: Savinja
- Municipality: Celje

Area
  - Total: 3.12 km^{2} (1.20 sq mi)
- Elevation: 322.4 m (1,058 ft)

Population (2020)
  - Total: 252
  - Density: 80.8/km^{2} (209/sq mi)

Brezova (pronounced [ˈbɾeːzɔʋa]) is a settlement in the City Municipality of Celje in eastern Slovenia. The area is part of the traditional region of Styria. It is now included with the rest of the municipality in the Savinja Statistical Region.
