= Březovice =

- Municipality
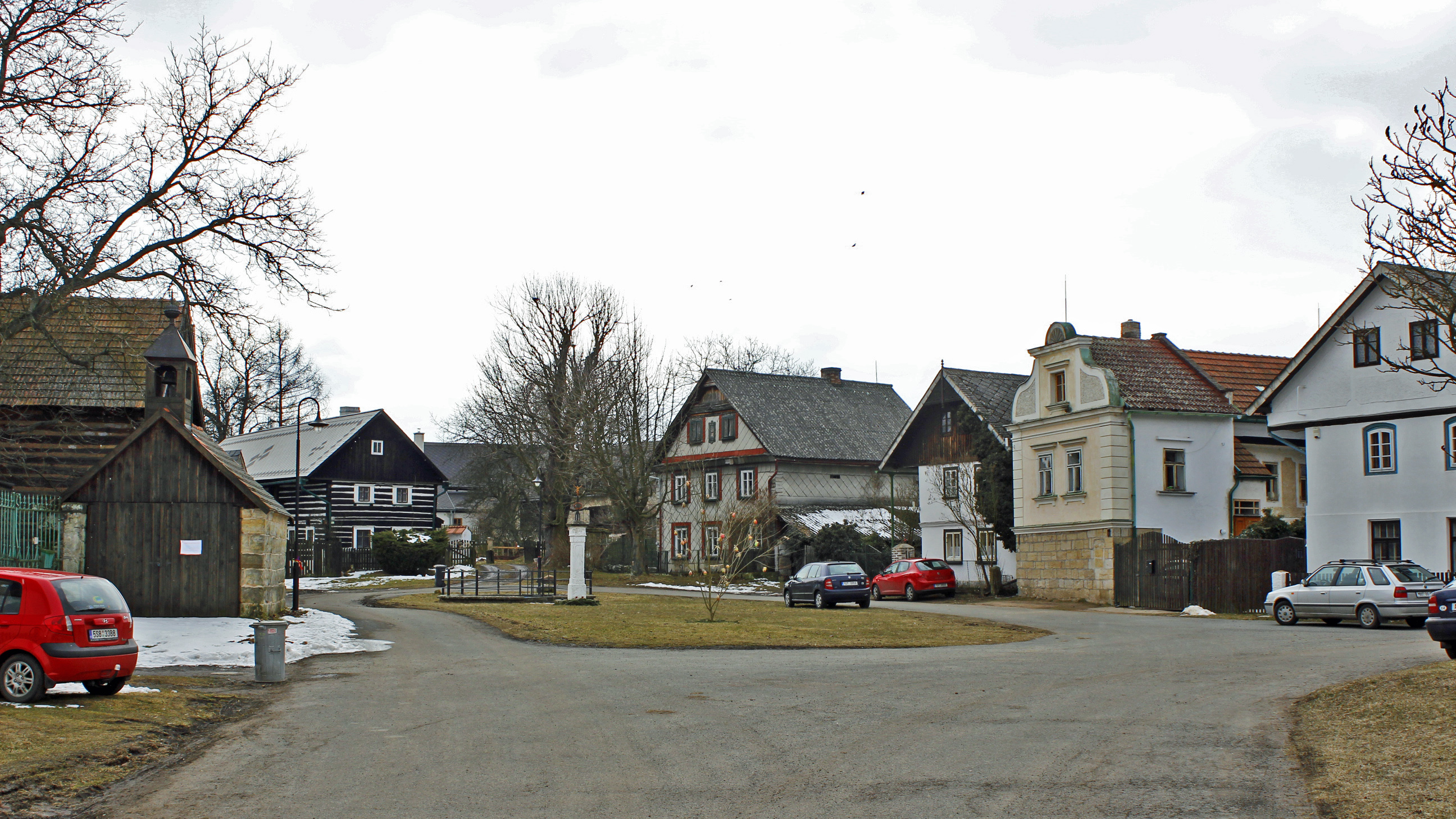
- Víska, a part of Březovice

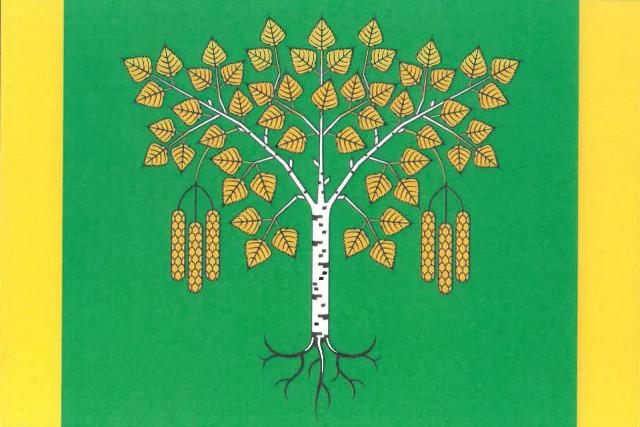
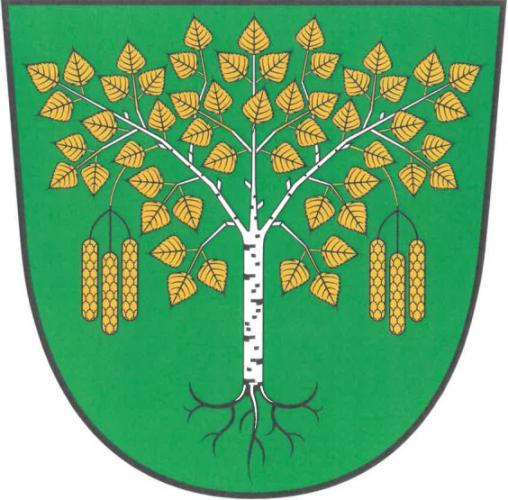
- Flag Coat of arms

- Location in the Czech Republic
- Coordinates: 50°28′15″N 14°44′1″E
- Country: Czech Republic
- Region: Central Bohemian
- District: Mladá Boleslav
- First mentioned: 1348

Area
  - Total: 16.32 km^{2} (6.30 sq mi)
- Elevation: 329 m (1,079 ft)

Population (2026-01-01)
  - Total: 345
  - Density: 21.1/km^{2} (54.8/sq mi)
- Time zone: UTC+1 (CET)
  - Summer (DST): UTC+2 (CEST)
- Postal codes: 294 24, 294 25
- Website: www.obecbrezovice.cz

Březovice is a municipality and village in Mladá Boleslav District in the Central Bohemian Region of the Czech Republic. It has about 300 inhabitants. The village of Víska within the municipality has valuable examples of folk architecture and is protected as a village monument reservation.

== Administrative division ==
Březovice consists of two municipal parts (in brackets population according to the 2021 census):

- Březovice (265)
- Víska (53)

== Demographics ==
Historical population
Year	Pop.	±%
1869	597	—
1880	636	+6.5%
1890	608	−4.4%
1900	562	−7.6%
1910	542	−3.6%
1921	562	+3.7%
1930	530	−5.7%
1950	363	−31.5%
1961	352	−3.0%
1970	299	−15.1%
1980	281	−6.0%
1991	264	−6.0%
2001	278	+5.3%
2011	319	+14.7%
2021	318	−0.3%
Source: Censuses
