= Cirkulane =

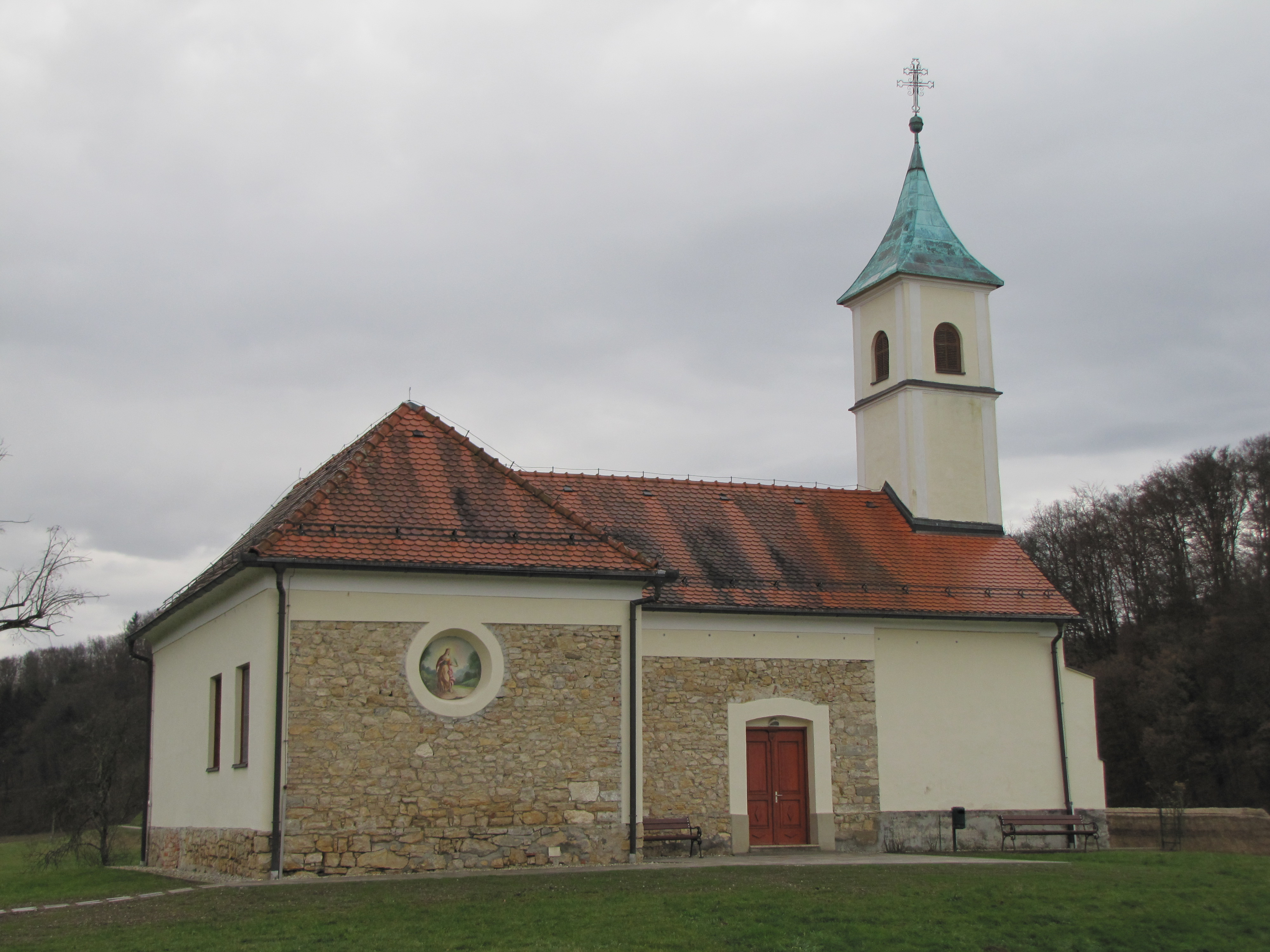

- Location in Slovenia
- Coordinates: 46°20′36.93″N 15°59′38.80″E
- Country: Slovenia
- Traditional region: Styria
- Statistical region: Drava
- Municipality: Cirkulane

Area
  - Total: 2.6 km^{2} (1.0 sq mi)
- Elevation: 229 m (751 ft)

Population (2020)
  - Total: 451
  - Density: 170/km^{2} (450/sq mi)

Cirkulane (pronounced [tsiɾkuˈlaːnɛ], German: Zirkulane) is a settlement in the Haloze area of Slovenia. It is the seat of the Municipality of Cirkulane. It lies between the right bank of the Drava River and the border with Croatia. The area traditionally belonged to the region of Styria. It is now included in the Drava Statistical Region.

The parish church in the village is dedicated to Saint Barbara and belongs to the Roman Catholic Archdiocese of Maribor. It was built in 1684 on the site of an earlier building. A second church in the southern part of the settlement is dedicated to Saint Catherine. It was built in 1926 to replace a 13th-century building.
