= Topličice, Semič =

Topličice
- Location in Slovenia
- Coordinates: 45°36′13.49″N 15°6′10.27″E
- Country: Slovenia
- Traditional region: Lower Carniola
- Statistical region: Southeast Slovenia
- Municipality: Semič
- Elevation: 603.2 m (1,979 ft)

Population (2002)
  - Total: none

Topličice (pronounced [tɔˈpliːtʃitsɛ]; formerly also Male Toplice; German: Töplitzel, Gottscheerish: Teplitzle) is a remote abandoned settlement in the Municipality of Semič in southern Slovenia. The area is part of the traditional region of Lower Carniola and is now included in the Southeast Slovenia Statistical Region. Its territory is now part of the village of Sredgora. It lies in a narrow dry valley 1 km east of Sredgora.

== Name ==
The name Topličice and names like it (e.g., Dolenjske Toplice) are derived from the Slovene common noun *toplica 'hot spring', referring to a local geological feature. The German name Töplitzel and Gottscheerish name Teplitzle are derived from the Slovenian name. Both the Slovene and German names are diminutives (with the suffixes -ice and -el), also reflected in the obsolete Slovene name Male Toplice, all literally 'little hot spring(s)'. The diminutive form may have also helped differentiate the settlement from many others named Toplice/Töplitz.

== History ==
Topličice was a Gottschee German village. It was not recorded in the land registry of 1574, and so it may have developed later as a settlement founded under the Counts of Blagay. It had six houses in 1750. Before the Second World War, the village had four houses and a population of 17. The forest railway between Rog and Črnomelj ran near the village. The population made a living by selling wood, raising livestock, and some viticulture, with vineyards located in Rodine. The original inhabitants were evicted from the village in the fall of 1941. It was burned by Italian troops in the summer of 1942 during the Rog Offensive and was never rebuilt. The ruins of the village are now registered as cultural heritage.

== Church ==
A chapel of ease dedicated to Saint Martin stood in the village. The church dated back to at least 1610, when its 80 kg bell was cast. As such, the church was the oldest known cultural monument in the Parish of Planina (German: Stockendorf).
