= Mali Rigelj =

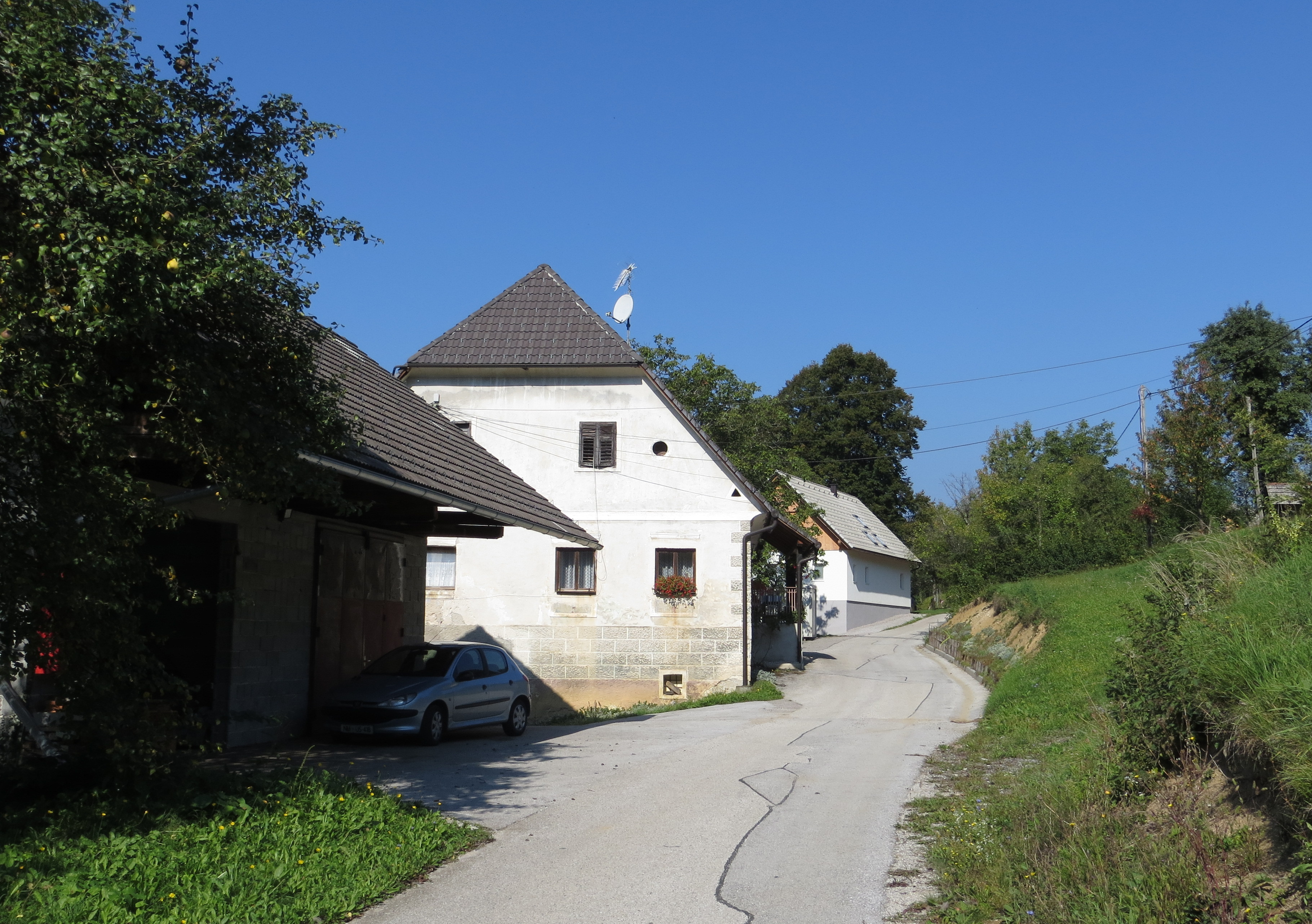

- Location in Slovenia
- Coordinates: 45°42′56.94″N 15°4′25.38″E
- Country: Slovenia
- Traditional region: Lower Carniola
- Statistical region: Southeast Slovenia
- Municipality: Dolenjske Toplice

Area
  - Total: 1.76 km^{2} (0.68 sq mi)
- Elevation: 306.3 m (1,005 ft)

Population (2020)
  - Total: 11
  - Density: 6.2/km^{2} (16/sq mi)

Mali Rigelj (pronounced [ˈmaːli ˈɾiːɡəl]; also Mali Rigel, German: Kleinriegel, sometimes Kleinrigel, also recorded as Schrigl in 1574, Gottscheerish: Riegl) is a small settlement in the Municipality of Dolenjske Toplice in Slovenia. The area is part of the historical region of Lower Carniola. The municipality is now included in the Southeast Slovenia Statistical Region.

== Name ==
The Slovene name Mali Rigelj (and German Kleinriegel) literally mean 'little Rigelj', distinguishing the village from neighboring 'big Rigelj' (Slovene: Veliki Rigelj, German: Großriegel). The name Rigelj is common in Slovenia. It is based on the Slovene common noun rigelj 'promontory', derived from German Riegel, which also has the same meaning in southern German dialects.

== History ==
Mali Rigelj was a Gottschee German village. The land registry of 1574 shows that it had two farms, subdivided into three half-farms and two quarter-farms and corresponding to between 30 and 35 residents. In 1931, the village had 10 houses and a population of 48. The village economy at that time was based on work at the local kiln, where cement roof tiles and pipes were produced, and day labor. Agriculture was insufficient to support the population, but they made some money selling apples and wine. The original residents were evicted on 3 December 1941, with the exception of one farm. During the Second World War, the Partisan Levstik Assault Battalion was formed in front of house no. 4 in the village. After the war, people arrived from elsewhere to live in the village and mostly commuted to work in Dolenjske Toplice.

== Church ==
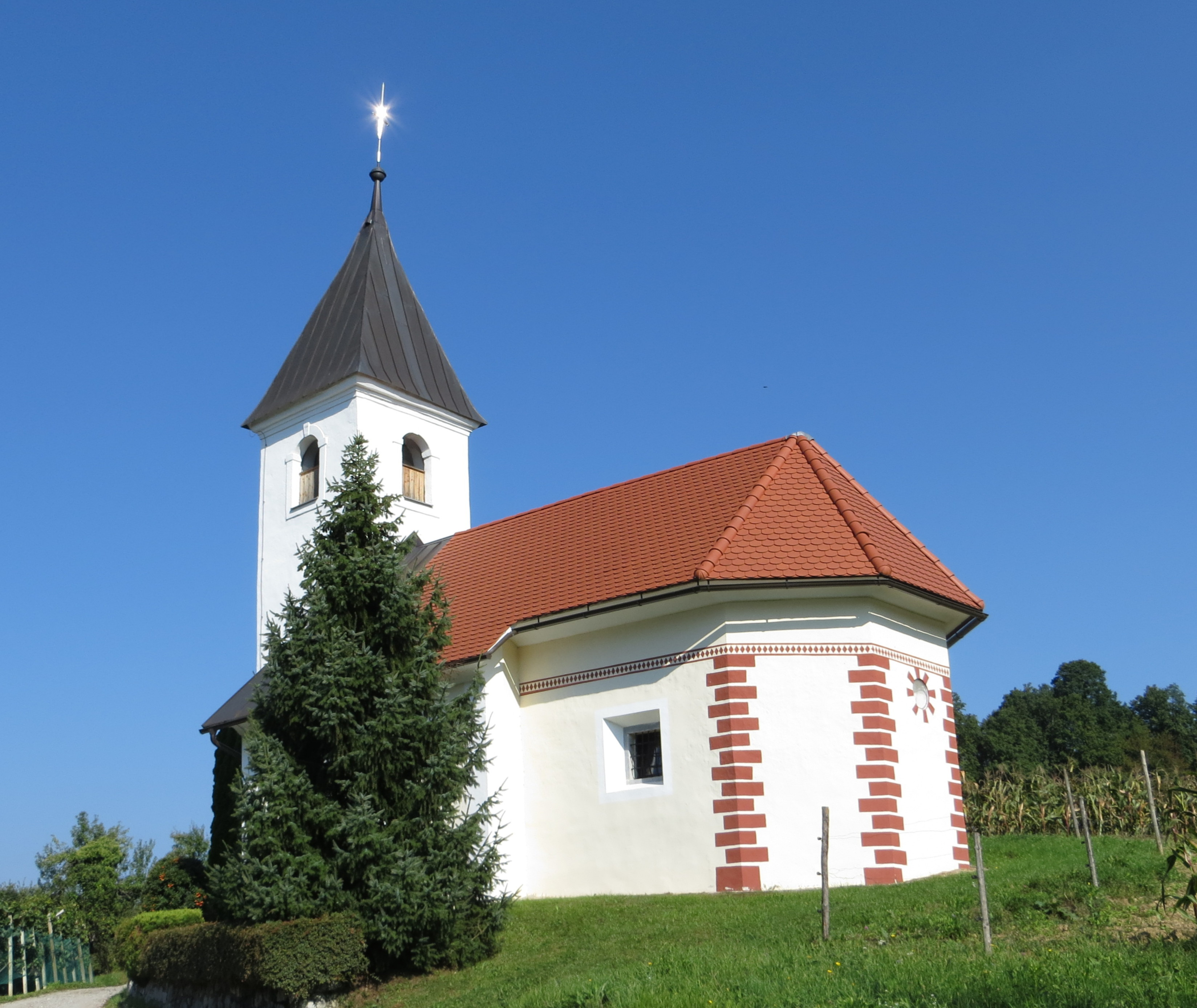
View from south

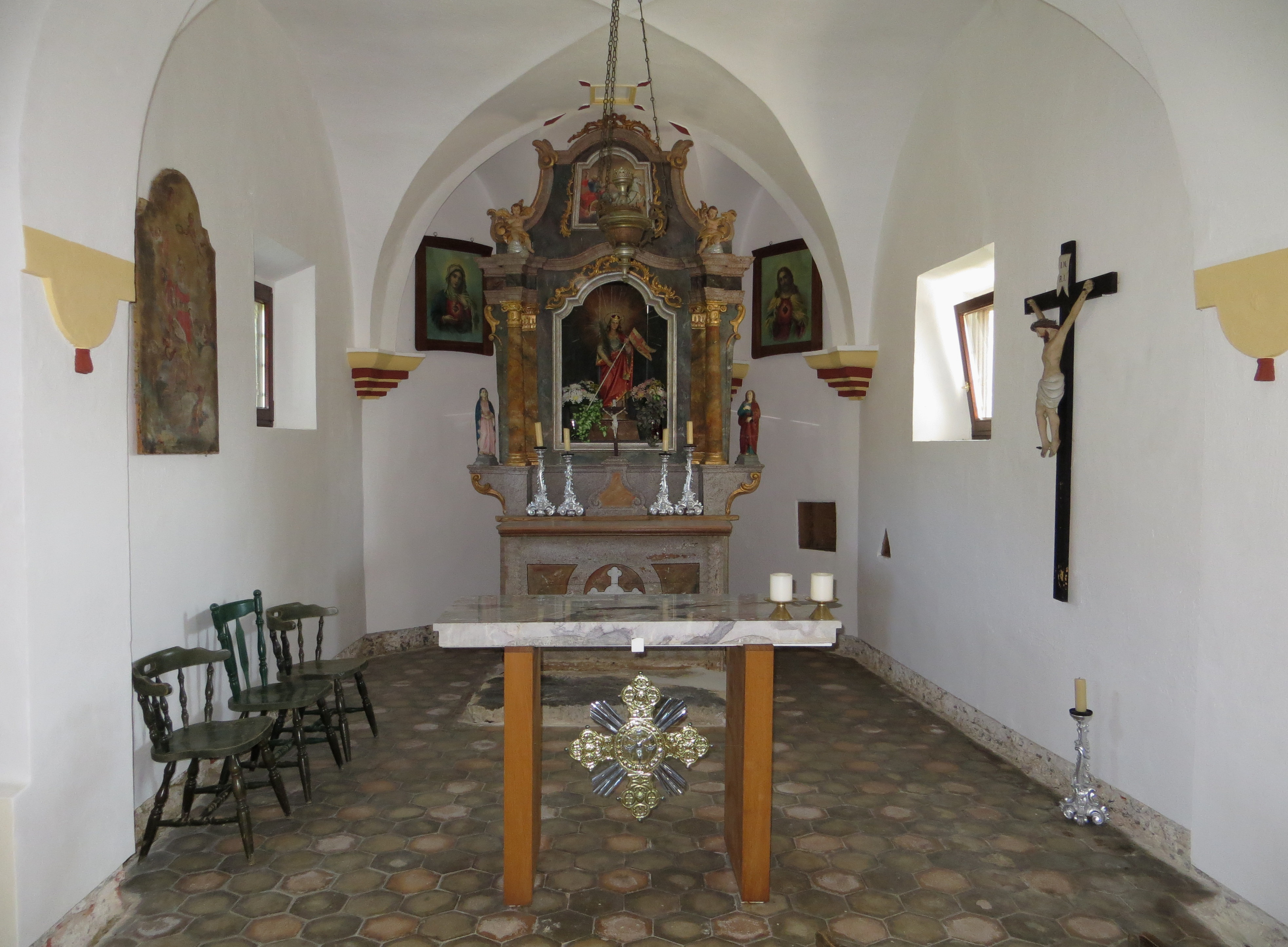
Interior

Saint Ursula's Church

The local church is dedicated to Saint Ursula and belongs to the Parish of Poljane–Dolenjske Toplice. It dates to the first half of the 18th century. It has a polygonal chancel walled on three sides with a groin-vaulted ceiling supported by large consoles, and a surbased spherical vault over the nave. The main altar is a Baroque work from the second half of the 18th century.

In addition to the church, there were also four wayside shrines in Mali Rigelj before the Second World War.
