= Cink =

- Location in Slovenia
- Coordinates: 45°42′26.39″N 14°58′53.95″E
- Country: Slovenia
- Traditional region: Lower Carniola
- Statistical region: Southeast Slovenia
- Municipality: Dolenjske Toplice
- Elevation: 685.4 m (2,249 ft)

Population (2002)
  - Total: none

Cink (pronounced [ˈtsiːŋk], also Frata; German: Zinken) is a remote abandoned settlement in the Municipality of Dolenjske Toplice in southern Slovenia. The area is part of the traditional region of Lower Carniola and is now included in the Southeast Slovenia Statistical Region. Its territory is now part of the village of Podstenice.

== History ==
Cink was a Gottschee German settlement. In 1924 the forest railway for the sawmill at Rog was extended toward Cink. During the Second World War the Partisans established a political school for the League of Communist Youth of Yugoslavia at the site, which was in operation for nearly a year. From July to August 1942 the command of the Partisan 5th Detachment Group was stationed at Cink after it was relocated from Podstenice, and a party conference was held there from 5 to 7 July or 8 July that year. A logger's cabin now stands at the site and a plaque was installed in the nearby forest in 1953.

=== Mass grave at Cink cross ===
After the Second World War, members of the Slovene Home Guard and other armed groups subordinate to the German forces were killed and buried in a mass grave 5 km east of the village known as the Double Shaft by Cink Cross Mass Grave (Slovene: Grobišče Dvojno brezno pri Cink križu). The victims are believed to have been transported to the site from the prison in Novo Mesto. The shafts are located at the crossroads to Cink on the road from Podstenice. The opening is 21 meters (69 ft) long, starting below an old beech grove and continuing along a fence. The bottoms of both shafts are covered by large rocks that fell there from the surface and the entryways to the shafts were dynamited. The grave site is registered as cultural heritage.

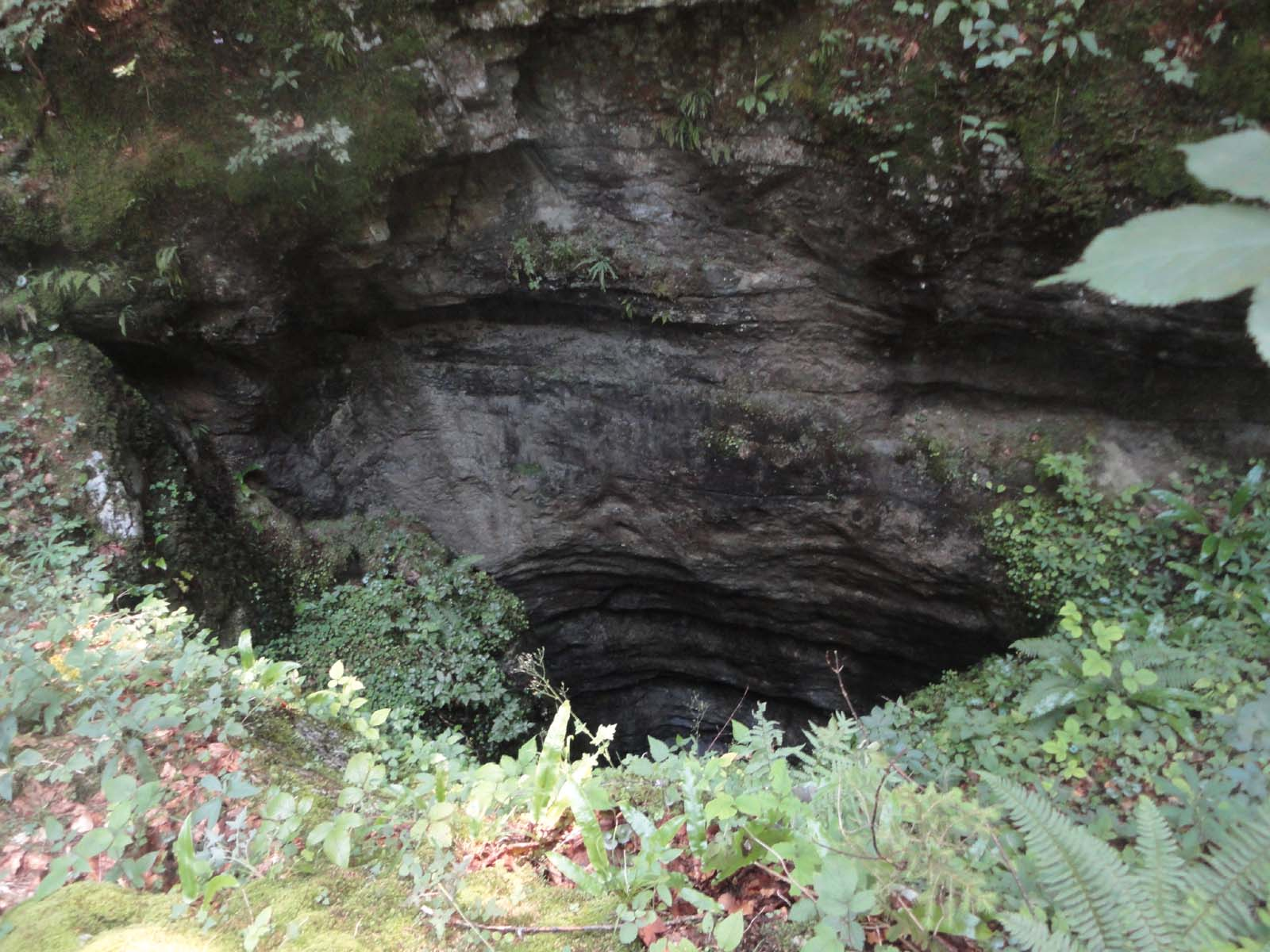
Double Shaft by Cink Cross Mass Grave

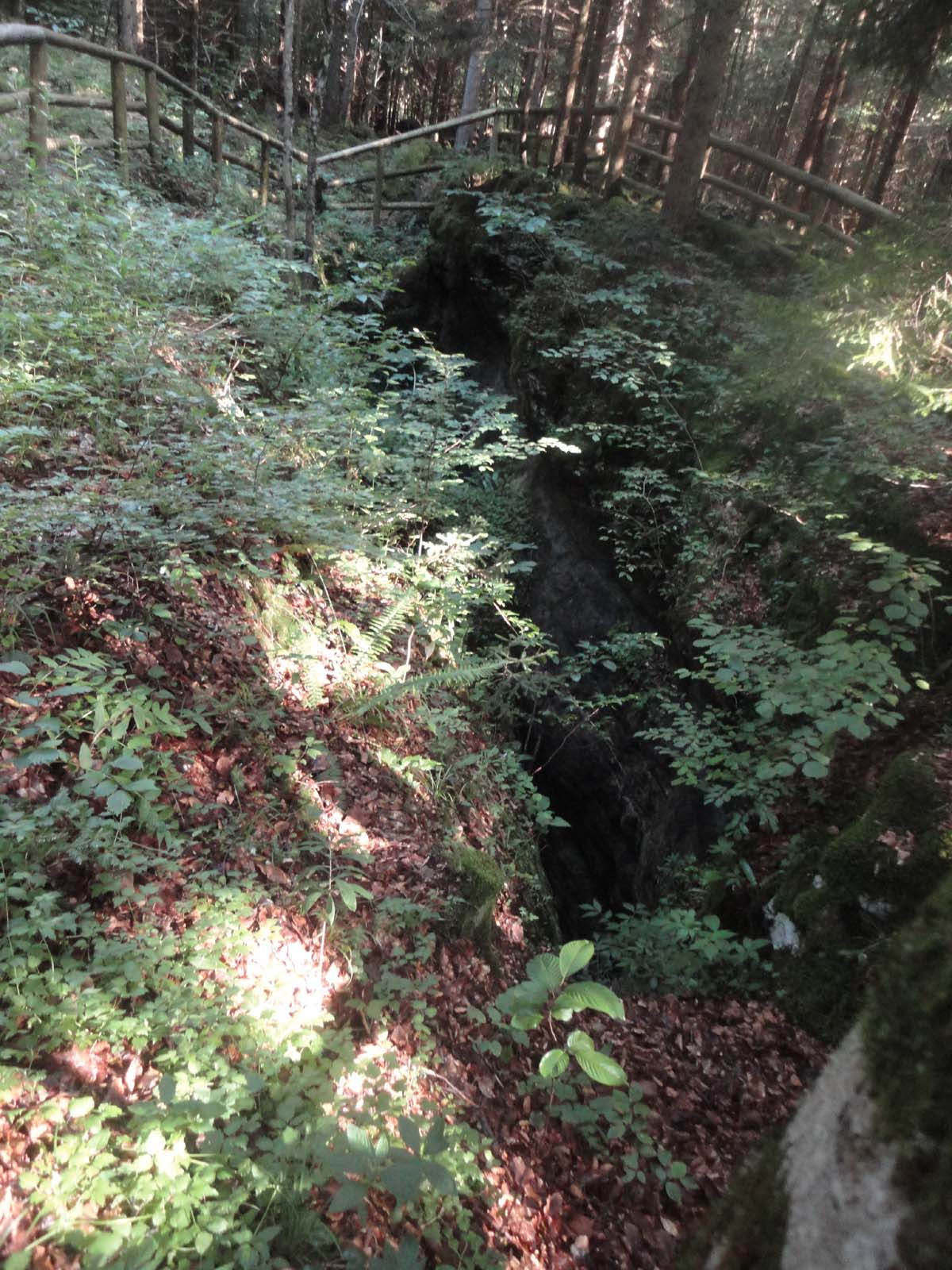
Double Shaft by Cink Cross Mass Grave
