= Kunc =

Kunc may refer to:

- Kunc (surname), a family name
- Kunč, an abandoned settlement in southern Slovenia
- KUNC, a radio station in northern Colorado, United States
