= Deleči Vrh =

- Location in Slovenia
- Coordinates: 45°42′36.47″N 15°2′10.83″E
- Country: Slovenia
- Traditional region: Lower Carniola
- Statistical region: Southeast Slovenia
- Municipality: Dolenjske Toplice
- Elevation: 624.4 m (2,049 ft)

Population (2002)
  - Total: 0

Deleči Vrh (pronounced [dɛˈleːtʃi ˈʋəɾx]; also Deleči Hrib, Daleč Vrh, Daleč Hrib; German: Laubbüchel, Gottscheerish: Lapiechl) is a remote abandoned settlement in the Municipality of Dolenjske Toplice in southern Slovenia. The area is part of the traditional region of Lower Carniola and is now included in the Southeast Slovenia Statistical Region. Its territory is now part of the village of Podstenice.

== Name ==
The name Deleči Vrh (and the variant Deleči Hrib) is believed to derive from the root Delet- as a personal or family name. The first part of the name is often cited as Daleč(i) (literally, 'distant') rather than Deleči, characterized as a folk etymology. The German name Laubbüchel literally means 'leafy hill', as does the Gottscheerish name Lapiechl (cf. lap 'foliage' = German Laub). The German name Neulagbüchl (literally, 'Neulag hill') can be found in older sources.

== History ==
Deleči Vrh was a Gottschee German village. It was not mentioned in the land registry of 1574 or the 1770 census, and was probably originally an isolated farmstead. The settlement may have been founded around 1580 by Countess Magdalena Blagay and her son Georg. In the cadastral registry of 1825 the settlement had three houses. In 1880 it had a population of 16 people living in two houses, but by 1931 this had declined to a population of two. It was already abandoned before the Second World War, and all that remained was a hunting lodge belonging to the Auersperg noble family. A forestry official working for the Auerspergs lived in the lodge, which had a telephone connection to Soteska Castle. From June to August 1942 the hunting lodge housed a Partisan hospital. The building was burned by Italian troops in the summer of 1942 during the Rog Offensive after the Partisans had evacuated it. After the war the Podturn Forestry Works (Slovene: Gozdarska organizacija Podturn) built a cabin at the site used part of the year by forestry workers. In recent years, the building has been made available for rental and is also used for organized vacations for children and young people.

The Jelendol Partisan Hospital was located in a gulch 1 km south of Deleči Vrh. Remains of the hospital include a patients' barracks maintained by the Partisan Veterans Organization and a nearby cemetery for the wounded.
