= Selišče =

Selišče may refer to the following places in Slovenia:

- Selišče, Dolenjske Toplice, a village in the Municipality of Dolenjske Toplice
- Selišče, Tolmin, a village in the Municipality of Tolmin
