= Sela pri Dolenjskih Toplicah =

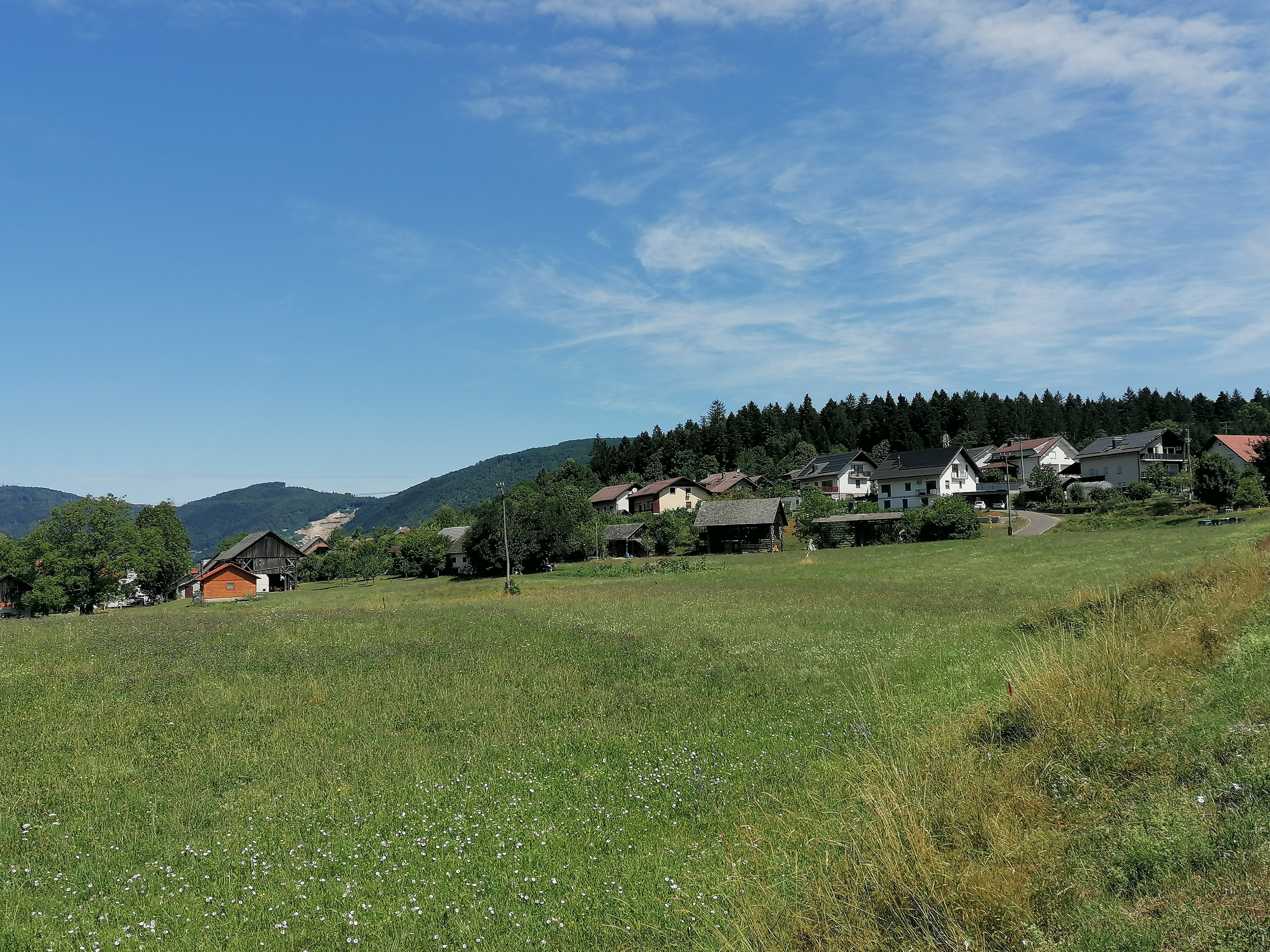

- Location in Slovenia
- Coordinates: 45°44′57.5″N 15°2′41.43″E
- Country: Slovenia
- Traditional region: Lower Carniola
- Statistical region: Southeast Slovenia
- Municipality: Dolenjske Toplice

Area
  - Total: 1.09 km^{2} (0.42 sq mi)
- Elevation: 182 m (597 ft)

Population (2020)
  - Total: 271
  - Density: 249/km^{2} (644/sq mi)

Sela pri Dolenjskih Toplicah (pronounced [ˈseːla pɾi dɔˈleːnskix tɔˈpliːtsax]) is a village southwest of Dolenjske Toplice in the historical region of Lower Carniola in Slovenia. The Municipality of Dolenjske Toplice is included in the Southeast Slovenia Statistical Region.

== Name ==
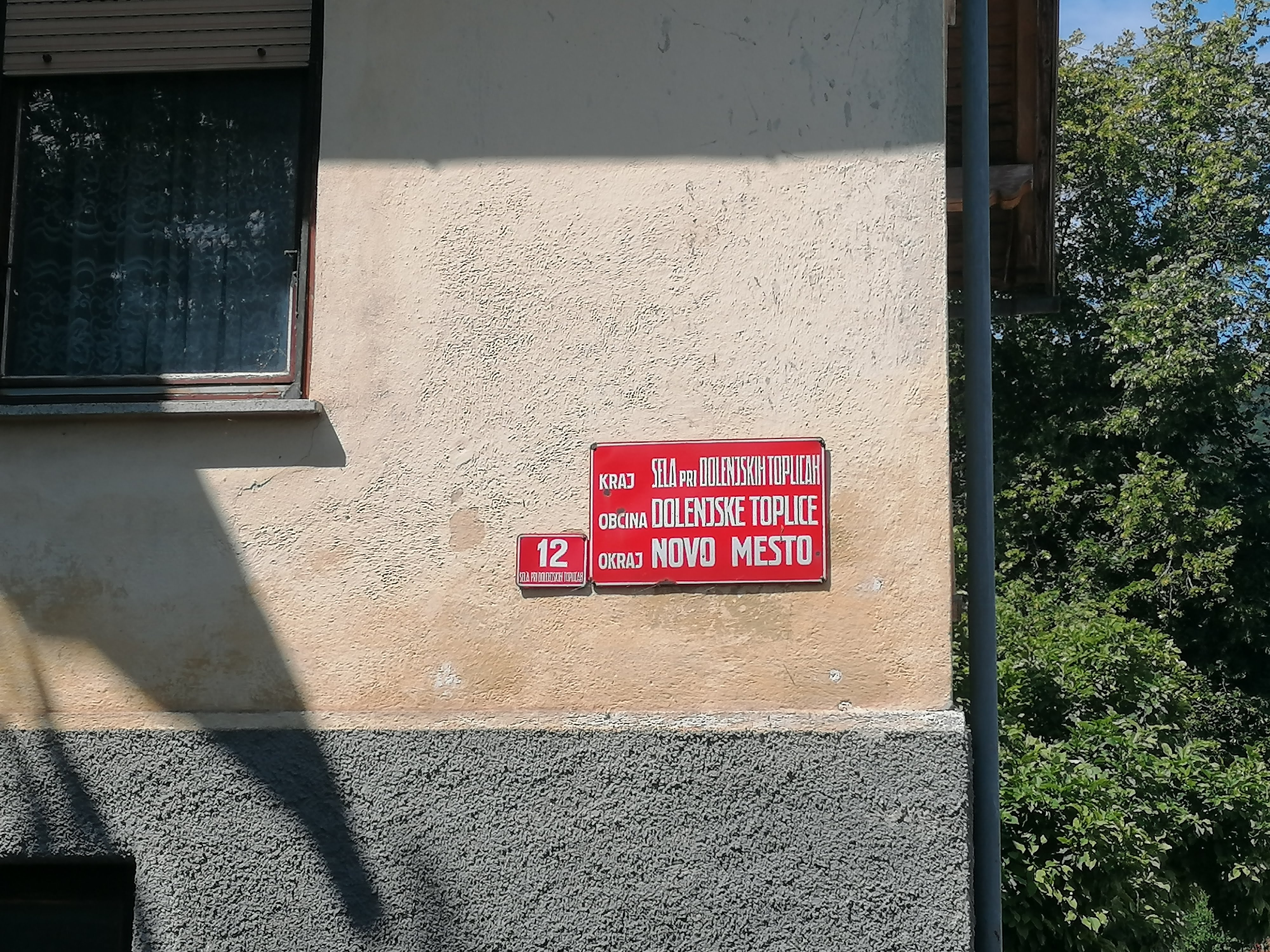
Former settlement sign

The name of the settlement was changed from Sela to Sela pri Dolenjskih Toplicah in 1953.
