= Meniška Vas =

- Location in Slovenia
- Coordinates: 45°43′52.36″N 15°3′26.25″E
- Country: Slovenia
- Traditional region: Lower Carniola
- Statistical region: Southeast Slovenia
- Municipality: Dolenjske Toplice

Area
  - Total: 1.54 km^{2} (0.59 sq mi)
- Elevation: 236.5 m (776 ft)

Population (2020)
  - Total: 359
  - Density: 233/km^{2} (604/sq mi)

Meniška Vas (pronounced [mɛˈniːʃka ˈʋaːs]; Slovene: Meniška vas; German: Mönichsdorf) is a small settlement in the Municipality of Dolenjske Toplice in Slovenia. It lies at the confluence of the Sušica and Krka rivers. The area is part of the historical region of Lower Carniola. The municipality is now included in the Southeast Slovenia Statistical Region.

The local church is dedicated to Saint Anthony the Great and belongs to the Parish of Toplice. It was built in the early 17th century.
