= Stan Smrke =

Canadian ice hockey player

- Born: September 2, 1928 Golobinjek, Yugoslavia
- Died: April 14, 1977 (aged 48) Toronto, Ontario, Canada
- Height: 5 ft 11 in (180 cm)
- Weight: 180 lb (82 kg; 12 st 12 lb)
- Position: Left
- Shot: Left
- Played for: Montreal Canadiens
- Playing career: 1947–1967

Stanko Smrke (September 2, 1928 — April 14, 1977) was a Yugoslavian-born Canadian ice hockey forward. He played 9 games in the National Hockey League with the Montreal Canadiens during the 1956–57 and 1957–58 seasons. The rest of his career, which lasted from 1947 to 1967, was spent in the minor leagues.

== Career ==
Smrke started his National Hockey League career with the Montreal Canadiens in 1956. He was the first Yugoslavian-born player ever to play in the NHL. Smrke played his entire NHL career (9 games) with the Habs. Over his career, he scored a total of three assists before being dropped by the team. His final season in the NHL was the 1957–58 season.

After leaving the NHL, he was sent to the minor leagues and became a member of the Rochester Americans. He is currently ranked fifth all-time in the Rochester Americans Hall of Fame.

== Personal life ==
He was born as Stanko Smrke in Golobinjek, in what was then the Kingdom of Serbs, Croats and Slovenes to a Slovene father and a Serb mother but grew up in Sudbury, Ontario. His son, John Smrke, was also a hockey player and played 103 games in the NHL with the St. Louis Blues and Quebec Nordiques.

== Career statistics ==
=== Regular season and playoffs ===
			Regular season					Playoffs
Season	Team	League	GP	G	A	Pts	PIM	GP	G	A	Pts	PIM
1945–46	Copper Cliff Jr. Redmen	NOJHA	3	4	0	4	0	—	—	—	—	—
1946–47	Toronto Young Rangers	OHA	5	0	0	0	0	—	—	—	—	—
1947–48	Atlantic City/Baltimore	EAHL	28	9	16	25	14	—	—	—	—	—
1947-1948	Baltimore Clippers	NHL	12	8	14	22	—	—	—	—	—	—
1948–49	Port-Alfred Elans	LSLHL	36	27	18	45	—	—	—	—	—	—
1949–50	Chicoutimi Sagueneens	QSHL	58	24	26	50	64	5	5	0	5	5
1950–51	Chicoutimi Sagueneens	QSHL	54	16	36	52	48	6	0	2	2	2
1951–52	Chicoutimi Sagueneens	QSHL	40	10	13	23	25	18	5	6	11	15
1952–53	Chicoutimi Sagueneens	QSHL	59	35	46	81	28	20	5	8	13	13
1953–54	Chicoutimi Sagueneens	QSHL	62	11	32	43	24	7	0	2	2	0
1954–55	Chicoutimi Sagueneens	QSHL	60	25	36	61	34	7	2	2	4	2
1955–56	Chicoutimi Sagueneens	QSHL	45	26	32	58	20	5	1	3	4	7
1956–57	Montreal Canadiens	NHL	4	0	0	0	0	—	—	—	—	—
1956–57	Chicoutimi Sagueneens	QSHL	33	20	18	38	22	—	—	—	—	—
1957–58	Montreal Canadiens	NHL	5	0	3	3	0	—	—	—	—	—
1957–58	Rochester Americans	AHL	63	20	19	39	32	—	—	—	—	—
1958–59	Chicoutimi Sagueneens	QSHL	57	36	32	68	40	—	—	—	—	—
1959–60	Rochester Americans	AHL	67	40	36	76	18	11	7	6	13	2
1960–61	Rochester Americans	AHL	21	10	12	22	6	—	—	—	—	—
1961–62	Rochester Americans	AHL	40	7	19	26	14	2	0	0	0	0
1962–63	Rochester Americans	AHL	71	22	25	47	16	2	1	0	1	0
1963–64	Rochester Americans	AHL	59	23	19	42	26	2	0	0	0	0
1964–65	Rochester Americans	AHL	71	33	49	92	28	10	5	4	9	4
1965–66	Rochester Americans	AHL	50	11	20	31	8	8	0	1	1	0
1966–67	Rochester Americans	AHL	71	31	30	61	24	13	2	7	9	2
AHL totals			513	197	239	436	172	48	15	18	33	8
QSHL totals			468	203	271	474	305	68	18	23	41	44
NHL totals			9	0	3	3	0	—	—	—	—	—
