= Cerovec, Dolenjske Toplice =

Cerovec
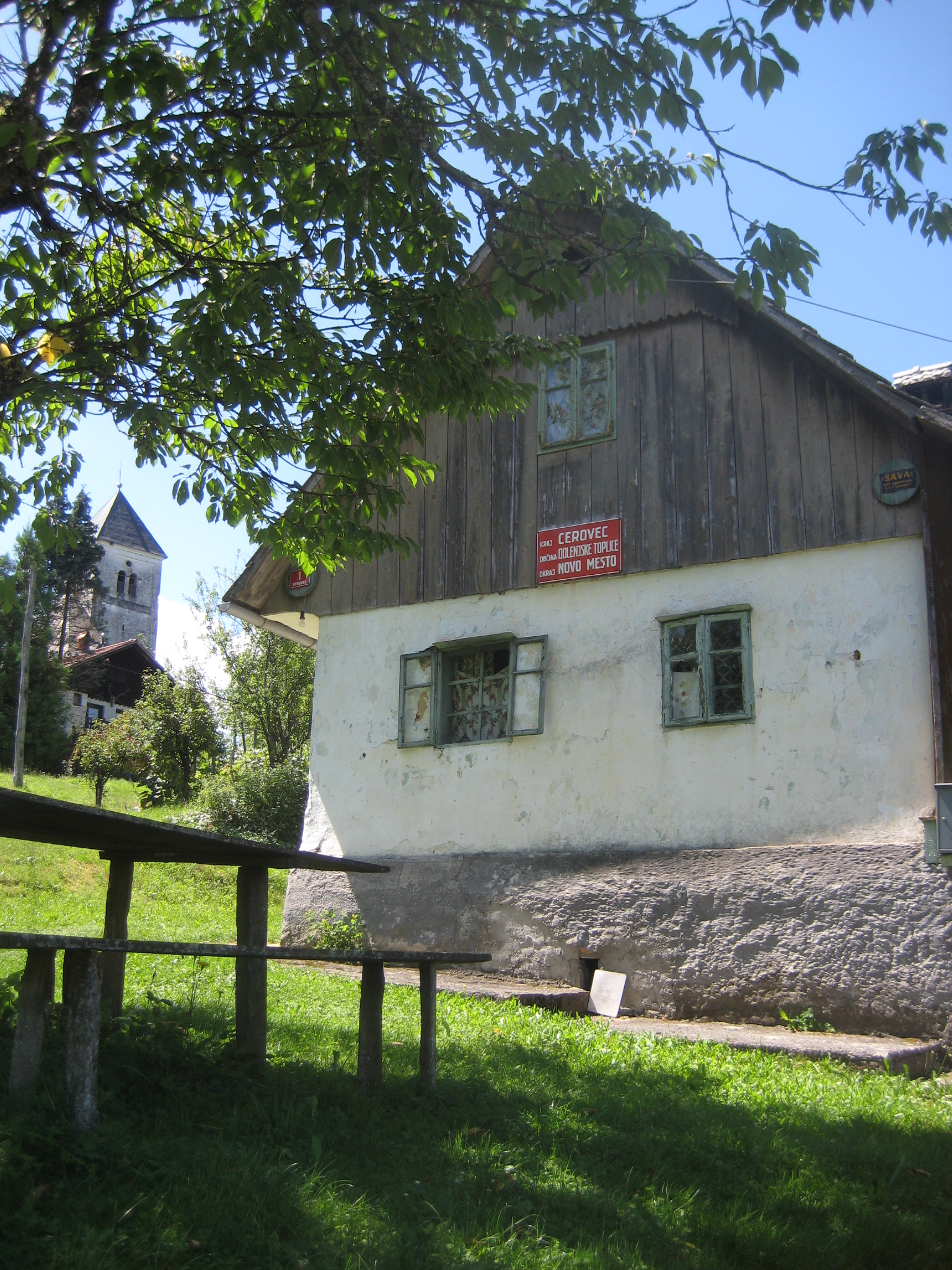

- Location in Slovenia
- Coordinates: 45°43′52.36″N 15°3′26.25″E
- Country: Slovenia
- Traditional region: Lower Carniola
- Statistical region: Southeast Slovenia
- Municipality: Dolenjske Toplice

Area
  - Total: 1.06 km^{2} (0.41 sq mi)
- Elevation: 236.5 m (776 ft)

Population (2020)
  - Total: 47
  - Density: 44/km^{2} (110/sq mi)

Cerovec (pronounced [tsɛˈɾɔːʋəts] or [tsɛˈɾoːʋəts]) is a small settlement in the Municipality of Dolenjske Toplice in Slovenia. The area is part of the historical region of Lower Carniola. The municipality is now included in the Southeast Slovenia Statistical Region.

The local church is dedicated to the Holy Trinity and belongs to the Parish of Toplice. It is a medieval building that was extensively renovated and restyled in the Baroque in the 17th century.
