= Kunč =

- Location in Slovenia
- Coordinates: 45°43′37.11″N 14°58′21.19″E
- Country: Slovenia
- Traditional region: Lower Carniola
- Statistical region: Southeast Slovenia
- Municipality: Dolenjske Toplice
- Elevation: 793.7 m (2,604 ft)

Population (2002)
  - Total: none

Kunč (pronounced [ˈkuːntʃ]; in older sources also Kunče, German: Kuntschen, Gottscheerish: Kuntschn) is a remote abandoned settlement in the Municipality of Dolenjske Toplice in southern Slovenia. The area is part of the traditional region of Lower Carniola and is now included in the Southeast Slovenia Statistical Region. Its territory is now part of the village of Podstenice. Northeast of Kunč there is an ice-filled cave called Ice Cave (Slovene: Ledena jama). It is connected to Kunč by a path and people would go to the cave for ice during times of drought.

== Name ==
The name Kunč is of uncertain origin. It may be derived from the surname Kunz or Künz, which was recorded in the land registry of 1574. Snoj explains the surname Kunz as a hypocorism of Konrad or Gunther.

== History ==
Kunč was a Gottschee German village. It was one of the oldest settlements in the Gottschee region, founded after external colonization of the region had ended circa 1400 and settlers began penetrating deeper into the forest. A small ruin in the village was probably from a manor farm owned by the Auersperg noble family and was said to be a hiding place for Veronika of Desenice. In the land registry of 1574 the settlement had one full farm and one half-farm with two owners, corresponding to a population between eight and 11. The 1770 census recorded three houses in Kunč. Kunč attained its greatest population in 1880, with 61 people living in 11 houses, after which it declined. The original ethnic German population, numbering 25 people from four houses, was evicted on 22 November 1941 and the village was burned by Italian troops during the Rog Offensive, probably between 20 and 23 August 1942. After the Second World War, the only structure at the site was a wooden shed with a stall and hayloft where forestry workers also lived part of the year.

A 1979 decree determined that Kunč no longer existed as a settlement.
