= Loška Vas =

- Location in Slovenia
- Coordinates: 45°46′11.7″N 15°1′27.43″E
- Country: Slovenia
- Traditional region: Lower Carniola
- Statistical region: Southeast Slovenia
- Municipality: Dolenjske Toplice

Area
  - Total: 7.17 km^{2} (2.77 sq mi)
- Elevation: 181.6 m (596 ft)

Population (2020)
  - Total: 80
  - Density: 11/km^{2} (29/sq mi)

Loška Vas (pronounced [ˈloːʃka ˈʋaːs]; Slovene: Loška vas) is a settlement on the right bank of the Krka River in the Municipality of Dolenjske Toplice in Slovenia. The area is part of the historical region of Lower Carniola. The municipality is now included in the Southeast Slovenia Statistical Region.

The local church is dedicated to Saint Martin and belongs to the Parish of Toplice. It dates to the late 17th century.
