= Gorenje Sušice =

- Location in Slovenia
- Coordinates: 45°43′33.16″N 15°5′41.74″E
- Country: Slovenia
- Traditional region: Lower Carniola
- Statistical region: Southeast Slovenia
- Municipality: Dolenjske Toplice

Area
  - Total: 2.24 km^{2} (0.86 sq mi)
- Elevation: 202.2 m (663 ft)

Population (2020)
  - Total: 125
  - Density: 55.8/km^{2} (145/sq mi)

Gorenje Sušice (pronounced [ɡɔˈɾeːnjɛ suˈʃiːtsɛ]) is a settlement in the Municipality of Dolenjske Toplice in Slovenia. The area is part of the historical region of Lower Carniola. The municipality is now included in the Southeast Slovenia Statistical Region.

The local church is dedicated to Saint Roch (Slovene: sveti Rok) and belongs to the Parish of Toplice. It was built in 1651.
