= Stare Žage =

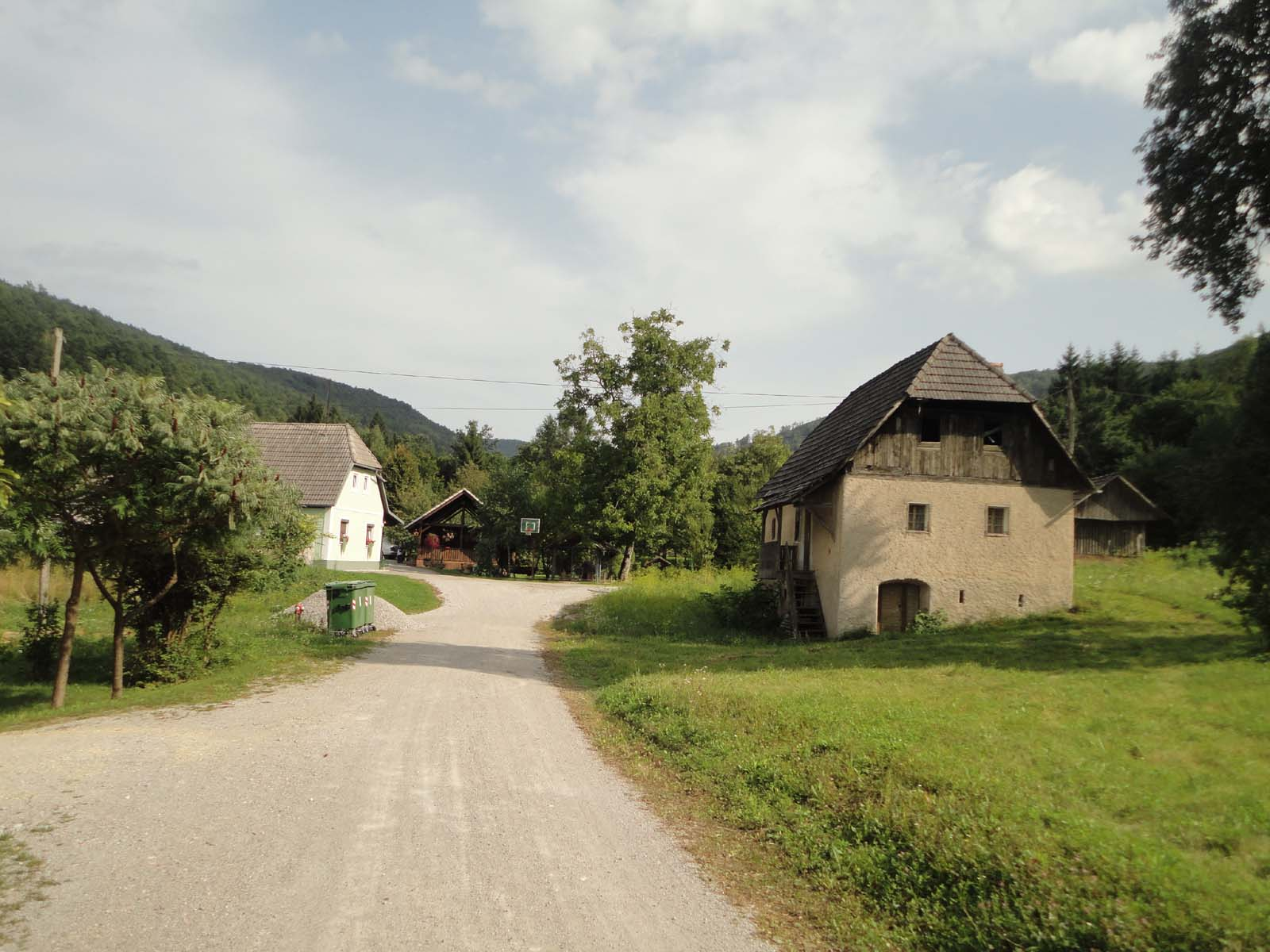
- Old Gottscheer houses in Stare Žage

- Location in Slovenia
- Coordinates: 45°42′9.31″N 15°4′43.34″E
- Country: Slovenia
- Traditional region: Lower Carniola
- Statistical region: Southeast Slovenia
- Municipality: Dolenjske Toplice

Area
  - Total: 2.27 km^{2} (0.88 sq mi)
- Elevation: 250.2 m (821 ft)

Population (2020)
  - Total: 32
  - Density: 14/km^{2} (37/sq mi)

Stare Žage (pronounced [ˈstaːɾɛ ˈʒaːɡɛ]; formerly also Stara žaga; German: Altsag, Gottscheerish: Autshug or Aotschock) is a settlement in the Municipality of Dolenjske Toplice in Slovenia. The area is part of the historical region of Lower Carniola. The municipality is now included in the Southeast Slovenia Statistical Region.

== Name ==
The Slovene name Stare Žage is semantically identical to the standard German name Altsag. They both mean 'old sawmill(s)' and are derived from German Säge 'sawmill', referring to the many sawmills formerly in the village.

== History ==
Stare Žage was a Gottschee German village. In the land register of 1574 it consisted of one full farm divided into two half-farms, with a population between 5 and 10. Before the Second World War, the village had seventeen houses and a population of 98. There were 17 water-powered sawmills in the village and nine mills in the village. After the war only one sawmill and one mill remained, both non-functional. There was also a restaurant in Stare Žage before the Second World War, run by the Petschauer (Pečaver) family and known as the Gasthaus Felsenkeller (literally, 'rock cellar inn') or Pri bikabirtu. Most of the population was evicted in the fall of 1941. Italian forces burned most of the houses and other buildings in the village during the Rog Offensive in 1942. From 1943 to 1945 Partisan workshops operated in some of the houses, and there were also warehouses for medical supplies and a small electrical power plant. After the war much of the village's architectural heritage was deliberately destroyed and planted over with spruce trees. Only one Gottschee German farmer remained in the village, and the other residents were laborers that had settled there after the war and were employed in nearby towns.

== Church ==
The local church is now a ruin. It was dedicated to Saint Michael and was built in the early 18th century.
