= Drenje, Dolenjske Toplice =

Drenje
- Location in Slovenia
- Coordinates: 45°47′1.92″N 15°0′29.12″E
- Country: Slovenia
- Traditional region: Lower Carniola
- Statistical region: Southeast Slovenia
- Municipality: Dolenjske Toplice

Area
  - Total: 1.56 km^{2} (0.60 sq mi)
- Elevation: 256.5 m (842 ft)

Population (2020)
  - Total: 59
  - Density: 38/km^{2} (98/sq mi)

Drenje (pronounced [ˈdɾeːnjɛ]; German: Dreine) is a small settlement on the left bank of the Krka River in the Municipality of Dolenjske Toplice in Slovenia. The area is part of the historical region of Lower Carniola. The municipality is now included in the Southeast Slovenia Statistical Region.

A late Bronze Age unfortified hill settlement has been identified on Plešivica Hill just north of the settlement.
