= Suhor pri Dolenjskih Toplicah =

- Location in Slovenia
- Coordinates: 45°45′13.71″N 15°2′3.96″E
- Country: Slovenia
- Traditional region: Lower Carniola
- Statistical region: Southeast Slovenia
- Municipality: Dolenjske Toplice

Area
  - Total: 1.42 km^{2} (0.55 sq mi)
- Elevation: 193 m (633 ft)

Population (2020)
  - Total: 59
  - Density: 42/km^{2} (110/sq mi)

Suhor pri Dolenjskih Toplicah (pronounced [suˈxoːɾ pɾi dɔˈleːnskix tɔˈpliːtsax]) is a small settlement in the Municipality of Dolenjske Toplice in Slovenia. The area is part of the historical region of Lower Carniola. The municipality is now included in the Southeast Slovenia Statistical Region.

== Name ==
The name of the settlement was changed from Suhor to Suhor pri Dolenjskih Toplicah in 1953.
