= Dolenje Gradišče, Dolenjske Toplice =

Dolenje Gradišče
- Location in Slovenia
- Coordinates: 45°46′6.8″N 15°3′10.65″E
- Country: Slovenia
- Traditional region: Lower Carniola
- Statistical region: Southeast Slovenia
- Municipality: Dolenjske Toplice

Area
  - Total: 0.19 km^{2} (0.073 sq mi)
- Elevation: 194.7 m (639 ft)

Population (2020)
  - Total: 25
  - Density: 130/km^{2} (340/sq mi)

Dolenje Gradišče (pronounced [dɔˈleːnjɛ ɡɾaˈdiːʃtʃɛ]) is a small settlement in the Municipality of Dolenjske Toplice in Slovenia. It lies at the confluence of the Sušica River with the Krka River in the historical region of Lower Carniola. The municipality is included in the Southeast Slovenia Statistical Region.

A prehistoric hill fort has been identified just north of the settlement.
