= Gorenje Gradišče, Dolenjske Toplice =

Gorenje Gradišče
- Location in Slovenia
- Coordinates: 45°45′59.67″N 15°3′21.75″E
- Country: Slovenia
- Traditional region: Lower Carniola
- Statistical region: Southeast Slovenia
- Municipality: Dolenjske Toplice

Area
  - Total: 0.46 km^{2} (0.18 sq mi)
- Elevation: 222.8 m (731 ft)

Population (2020)
  - Total: 78
  - Density: 170/km^{2} (440/sq mi)

Gorenje Gradišče (pronounced [ɡɔˈɾeːnjɛ ɡɾaˈdiːʃtʃɛ]) is a small settlement on the right bank of the Sušica River in the Municipality of Dolenjske Toplice in Slovenia. The municipality is included in the Southeast Slovenia Statistical Region. The area is part of the historical region of Lower Carniola.
