= Gorenje Polje, Dolenjske Toplice =

Gorenje Polje
- Location in Slovenia
- Coordinates: 45°46′13.3″N 15°2′32.7″E
- Country: Slovenia
- Traditional region: Lower Carniola
- Statistical region: Southeast Slovenia
- Municipality: Dolenjske Toplice

Area
  - Total: 1.16 km^{2} (0.45 sq mi)
- Elevation: 184.2 m (604 ft)

Population (2020)
  - Total: 77
  - Density: 66/km^{2} (170/sq mi)

Gorenje Polje (pronounced [ɡɔˈɾeːnjɛ ˈpoːljɛ]; German: Oberfeld) is a settlement on the left bank of the Krka River in the Municipality of Dolenjske Toplice in Slovenia. The area is part of the historical region of Lower Carniola. The municipality is now included in the Southeast Slovenia Statistical Region.
