= Golobinjek =

- Location in Slovenia
- Coordinates: 45°37′2.85″N 15°2′58.96″E
- Country: Slovenia
- Traditional region: Lower Carniola
- Statistical region: Southeast Slovenia
- Municipality: Semič
- Elevation: 887.1 m (2,910 ft)

Population (2002)
  - Total: 0

Golobinjek (pronounced [ɡɔlɔˈbiːnjɛk]; German: Taubenbrunn) is a remote former settlement in the Municipality of Semič in southern Slovenia. The area is part of the traditional region of Lower Carniola and is now included in the Southeast Slovenia Statistical Region. Its territory is now part of the village of Planina.

== History ==
Golobinjek was a Gottschee German village. The last of the originally settlers moved away in 1891, at which point the Auersperg noble family moved workers to the village to prepare timber for the sawmill at Rog. Three houses in the village were still inhabited in 1931. Italian troops burned the village during the Rog Offensive in the summer of 1942 and it was not rebuilt after the war.
