= Podturn pri Dolenjskih Toplicah =

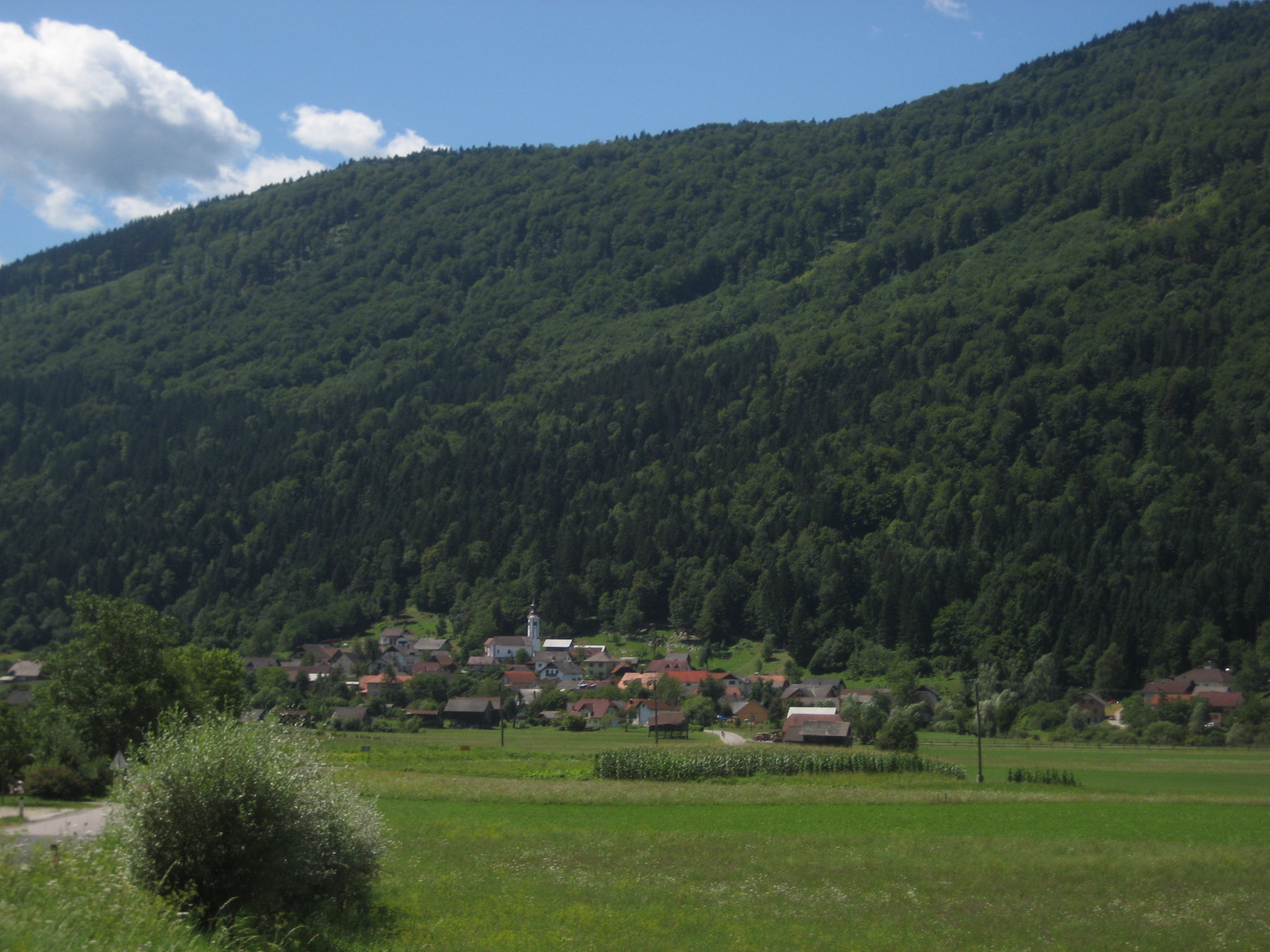

- Location in Slovenia
- Coordinates: 45°44′29.97″N 15°2′27.99″E
- Country: Slovenia
- Traditional region: Lower Carniola
- Statistical region: Southeast Slovenia
- Municipality: Dolenjske Toplice

Area
  - Total: 4.7 km^{2} (1.8 sq mi)
- Elevation: 182 m (597 ft)

Population (2020)
  - Total: 333
  - Density: 71/km^{2} (180/sq mi)

Podturn pri Dolenjskih Toplicah (pronounced [pɔˈtuːɾn pɾi dɔˈleːnskix tɔˈpliːtsax], German: Unterthurn) is a village in the Municipality of Dolenjske Toplice in Slovenia. The area is part of the historical region of Lower Carniola. The municipality is now included in the Southeast Slovenia Statistical Region.

== Name ==
The name of the settlement was changed from Podturn to Podturn pri Dolenjskih Toplicah in 1953.

== Church ==
The local church is dedicated to Saint Nicholas and belongs to the Parish of Toplice. It dates to the mid-17th century.
