= Dolenje Polje =

- Location in Slovenia
- Coordinates: 45°46′29.16″N 15°3′0.49″E
- Country: Slovenia
- Traditional region: Lower Carniola
- Statistical region: Southeast Slovenia
- Municipality: Dolenjske Toplice

Area
  - Total: 1.13 km^{2} (0.44 sq mi)
- Elevation: 312.1 m (1,024 ft)

Population (2020)
  - Total: 68
  - Density: 60/km^{2} (160/sq mi)

Dolenje Polje (pronounced [dɔˈleːnjɛ ˈpoːljɛ]; German: Unterfeld) is a settlement on the left bank of the Krka River in the Municipality of Dolenjske Toplice in Slovenia. The area is part of the historical region of Lower Carniola. The municipality is now included in the Southeast Slovenia Statistical Region.
