= Bušinec =

- Location in Slovenia
- Coordinates: 45°43′46.18″N 15°4′17.12″E
- Country: Slovenia
- Traditional region: Lower Carniola
- Statistical region: Southeast Slovenia
- Municipality: Dolenjske Toplice

Area
  - Total: 0.98 km^{2} (0.38 sq mi)
- Elevation: 208.1 m (683 ft)

Population (2020)
  - Total: 48
  - Density: 49/km^{2} (130/sq mi)

Bušinec (pronounced [buˈʃiːnəts]) is a small settlement in the Municipality of Dolenjske Toplice in Slovenia. The area is part of the historical region of Lower Carniola. The municipality is now included in the Southeast Slovenia Statistical Region.

== History ==
A prehistoric settlement has been discovered at sites in the upper and lower parts of the settlement. The two hamlets of the village—Dolnji Bušinec (German: Unterwuschinz) and Gornji Bušinec (German: Oberwuschinz)—were formerly separate villages.
