= Trnovec, Kočevje =

Trnovec
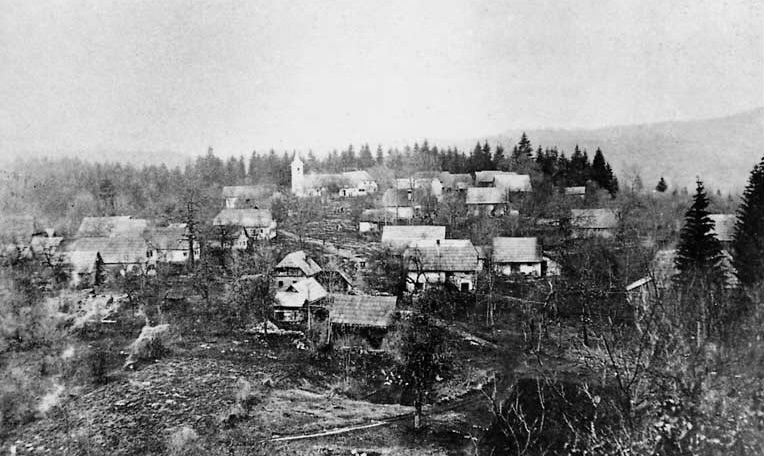
- Trnovec before the Second World War

- Location in Slovenia
- Coordinates: 45°40′29.96″N 14°59′34.99″E
- Country: Slovenia
- Traditional region: Lower Carniola
- Statistical region: Southeast Slovenia
- Municipality: Kočevje

Area
  - Total: 21.38 km^{2} (8.25 sq mi)
- Elevation: 801.9 m (2,631 ft)

Population (2002)
  - Total: 6
- Postal code: 1330

Trnovec (pronounced [təɾˈnoːʋəts]; German: Tiefenreuther or Tiefenreuter) is a settlement in the hills northeast of the town of Kočevje in southern Slovenia. The area is part of the traditional region of Lower Carniola and is now included in the Southeast Slovenia Statistical Region.

== Name ==
Trnovec was attested in historical sources as Tieffenreutter in 1574. After the Second World War, the settlement of Trnovec was administratively combined with Podstenice and shared that name. It was separated again from Podstenice in 1988 and Trnovec was reestablished as a separate settlement.

== History ==
Trnovec was settled by Gottschee Germans in the Middle Ages. It had 17 houses in the early 20th century.

At the start of the Second World War, its original population was evicted. As part of the Rog Offensive in the summer of 1942, the village was burned by Italian forces. After the Italian surrender in 1943, the Yugoslav Partisans used a site below the village to store ammunition.

=== Mass graves ===
Trnovec is the site of three known mass graves associated with the Second World War. The Rog Sawmill Mass Grave (Slovene: Grobišče pri Žagi Rog) is located on the edge of the woods on the left side of Rog Road, at a large pile of sawdust. The remains of unknown victims were found at the site in 1989. The Larch Hill Cave Mass Grave (Grobišče Jama pod Macesnovo gorico) is located on a heavily karstified ridge 150 meters (490 ft) north of Rog Road and 900 meters (3,000 ft) southwest of Larch Hill (Macesnova gorica). It contains the remains of a large number of Home Guard troops and soldiers of other nationalities that were turned over to the Yugoslav authorities after the war and murdered. In 2022, the remains of 3,200 victims were exhumed from the site. The Larch Hill Rock Shelter Mass Grave (Grobišče Spodmol pri Macesnovi gorici) lies on the southwest edge of a shallow sinkhole in the middle of a wooded leveled karstified area southwest of Larch Hill. It contains the remains of one or more unknown victims that probably fled to the rock shelter during the war or during the killing at Larch Hill Cave.

== Church ==
The local church, dedicated to the Virgin Mary, was a late Gothic building that was burned down in 1942 during the Second World War.
