= Dolenje Sušice =

- Location in Slovenia
- Coordinates: 45°44′26.66″N 15°4′32.44″E
- Country: Slovenia
- Traditional region: Lower Carniola
- Statistical region: Southeast Slovenia
- Municipality: Dolenjske Toplice

Area
  - Total: 2.17 km^{2} (0.84 sq mi)
- Elevation: 195.3 m (641 ft)

Population (2020)
  - Total: 140
  - Density: 65/km^{2} (170/sq mi)

Dolenje Sušice (pronounced [dɔˈleːnjɛ suˈʃiːtsɛ]) is a small settlement in the Municipality of Dolenjske Toplice in Slovenia. It lies on the right bank of the Sušica River south of Dolenjske Toplice. The area is part of the historical region of Lower Carniola. The municipality is now included in the Southeast Slovenia Statistical Region.
