= Podhosta =

- Location in Slovenia
- Coordinates: 45°45′39.62″N 15°1′48.71″E
- Country: Slovenia
- Traditional region: Lower Carniola
- Statistical region: Southeast Slovenia
- Municipality: Dolenjske Toplice

Area
  - Total: 4.11 km^{2} (1.59 sq mi)
- Elevation: 187.7 m (616 ft)

Population (2020)
  - Total: 173
  - Density: 42.1/km^{2} (109/sq mi)

Podhosta (pronounced [pɔtˈxoːsta]) is a small settlement in the Municipality of Dolenjske Toplice in Slovenia. It lies on the right bank of the Krka River northwest of Dolenjske Toplice. The area is part of the historical region of Lower Carniola. The municipality is now included in the Southeast Slovenia Statistical Region.
