= Obrh, Dolenjske Toplice =

Obrh
- Location in Slovenia
- Coordinates: 45°45′3.99″N 15°2′6.73″E
- Country: Slovenia
- Traditional region: Lower Carniola
- Statistical region: Southeast Slovenia
- Municipality: Dolenjske Toplice

Area
  - Total: 0.63 km^{2} (0.24 sq mi)
- Elevation: 178.1 m (584 ft)

Population (2020)
  - Total: 72
  - Density: 110/km^{2} (300/sq mi)

Obrh (pronounced [ɔˈbəɾx]) is a small settlement in the Municipality of Dolenjske Toplice in the historical region of Lower Carniola in Slovenia. The municipality is included in the Southeast Slovenia Statistical Region.
