= Gabrje pri Soteski =

- Location in Slovenia
- Coordinates: 45°46′26.27″N 15°2′7.25″E
- Country: Slovenia
- Traditional region: Lower Carniola
- Statistical region: Southeast Slovenia
- Municipality: Dolenjske Toplice

Area
  - Total: 0.65 km^{2} (0.25 sq mi)
- Elevation: 217.6 m (714 ft)

Population (2020)
  - Total: 37
  - Density: 57/km^{2} (150/sq mi)

Gabrje pri Soteski (pronounced [ˈɡaːbəɾjɛ pɾi sɔˈteːski]) is a small settlement in the Municipality of Dolenjske Toplice in Slovenia. It lies on the left bank of the Krka River on the road between Straža and Soteska. The area is part of the historical region of Lower Carniola. The municipality is now included in the Southeast Slovenia Statistical Region.

== Name ==
The name of the settlement was changed from Gabrje to Gabrje pri Soteski in 1953.
