= Veliki Rigelj =

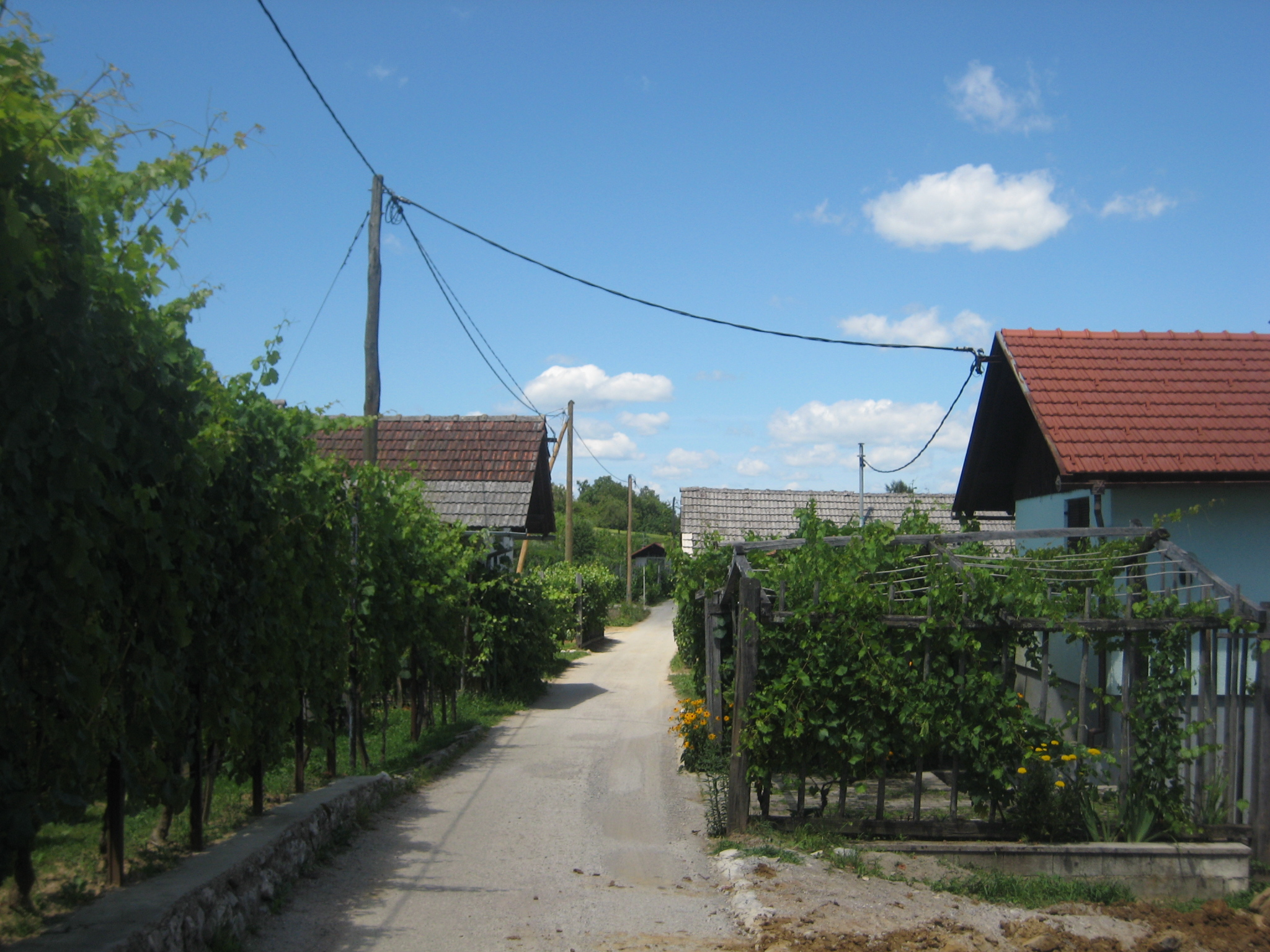

- Location in Slovenia
- Coordinates: 45°43′30.65″N 15°3′53.51″E
- Country: Slovenia
- Traditional region: Lower Carniola
- Statistical region: Southeast Slovenia
- Municipality: Dolenjske Toplice

Area
  - Total: 0.8 km^{2} (0.31 sq mi)
- Elevation: 301.5 m (989 ft)

Population (2020)
  - Total: 29
  - Density: 36/km^{2} (94/sq mi)

Veliki Rigelj (pronounced [ˈʋeːliki ˈɾiːɡəl]) is a settlement in the Municipality of Dolenjske Toplice in Slovenia. The municipality is included in the Southeast Slovenia Statistical Region. The entire area is part of the historical region of Lower Carniola.
