= Kunc (surname) =

Kunc is a surname. Notable people with the surname include:

- Aymé Kunc (1877–1958), French composer
- Božidar Kunc (1903–1964), Croatian composer
- Karen Kunc (born 1952), American printmaker and book artist
- Jan Kunc (1883–1976), Czech composer
- Milan Kunc (born 1944), Czech painter and sculptor
- Mitja Kunc (born 1971), Slovene alpine skier
- Pierre Kunc (1865–1941), French composer
- Zinka Kunc (1906–1989), Croatian operatic soprano

== See also ==
- Kunz
