= Selišče, Dolenjske Toplice =

Selišče
- Location in Slovenia
- Coordinates: 45°44′10.47″N 15°4′28.72″E
- Country: Slovenia
- Traditional region: Lower Carniola
- Statistical region: Southeast Slovenia
- Municipality: Dolenjske Toplice

Area
  - Total: 1.19 km^{2} (0.46 sq mi)
- Elevation: 196.3 m (644 ft)

Population (2020)
  - Total: 43
  - Density: 36/km^{2} (94/sq mi)

Selišče (pronounced [sɛˈliːʃtʃɛ]) is a small settlement on the left bank of the Sušica River in the Municipality of Dolenjske Toplice in Slovenia. The area is part of the historical region of Lower Carniola. The municipality is now included in the Southeast Slovenia Statistical Region.
