= Rog, Kočevje =

Rog
- Location in Slovenia
- Coordinates: 45°40′29.12″N 15°0′19.80″E
- Country: Slovenia
- Traditional region: Lower Carniola
- Statistical region: Southeast Slovenia
- Municipality: Kočevje
- Elevation: 842.3 m (2,763 ft)

Population (2002)
  - Total: 0

Rog (pronounced [ˈɾoːk]; German: Hornwald, Gottscheerish: Hoarnwald) is a remote abandoned settlement in the Municipality of Kočevje in southern Slovenia. The area is part of the traditional region of Lower Carniola and is now included in the Southeast Slovenia Statistical Region. Its territory is now part of the village of Trnovec.

== Name ==
Rog (German: Hornwald) is named after Big Mount Rog (Slovene: Veliki Rog, German: Hornbühel, Hornbühel, or Hornbichl, 1099 m), the highest elevation in the area. The name of the Kočevje Rog Plateau (German: Hornwald) is also derived from this mountain. One of the meanings of the Slovene common noun rog is 'prominent/exposed hill', paralleled by one of the meanings of the German common noun Horn 'highest peak'.

== History ==
A steam-powered sawmill owned by the Auersperg noble family operated at Rog from 1894 until 1932, employing up to 400 workers. The settlement had its own electric plant and waterworks. In 1931 and 1936 the settlement had three houses and 44 residents. After it shut down operations, the facilities were dynamited in 1938 and the 50 km narrow gauge railway was pulled up and sold for scrap. Only three watchmen remained, and they were evicted from the area in the fall of 1941. Today the site, including cisterns and remains of the sawmill, are registered as cultural heritage.
