= Municipality of Dolenjske Toplice =

Municipality of Slovenia

Municipality of Dolenjske Toplice Občina Dolenjske Toplice
- Municipality
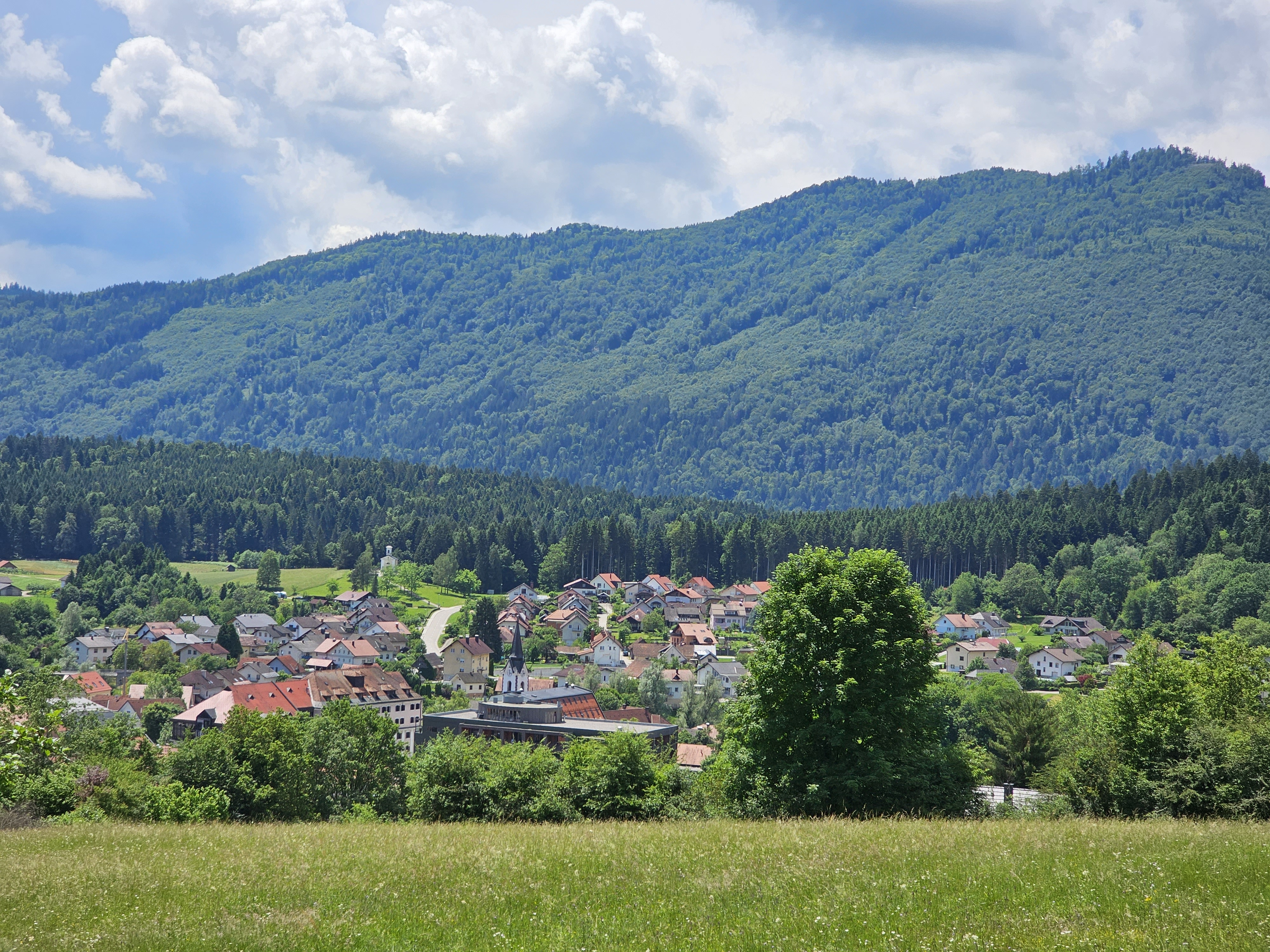

- Location of the Municipality of Dolenjske Toplice in Slovenia
- Coordinates: 45°45′N 15°03′E
- Country: Slovenia

Government
  - Mayor: Franc Vovk (Independent)

Area
  - Total: 110.2 km^{2} (42.5 sq mi)

Population (2002)
  - Total: 3,298
  - Density: 29.93/km^{2} (77.51/sq mi)
- Time zone: UTC+01 (CET)
  - Summer (DST): UTC+02 (CEST)
- Website: www.dolenjske-toplice.si

The Municipality of Dolenjske Toplice (Slovene: Občina Dolenjske Toplice; pronounced [ˈóːptʃina dɔˈleːnskɛ tɔˈpliːtsɛ]) is a municipality near Novo Mesto in southeastern Slovenia. Its seat is the town of Dolenjske Toplice. The area is part of the traditional region of Lower Carniola. The municipality is now included in the Southeast Slovenia Statistical Region.

== Settlements ==
In addition to the municipal seat of Dolenjske Toplice, the municipality also includes the following settlements:

- Bušinec
- Cerovec
- Dobindol
- Dolenje Gradišče
- Dolenje Polje
- Dolenje Sušice
- Drenje
- Gabrje pri Soteski
- Gorenje Gradišče
- Gorenje Polje
- Gorenje Sušice
- Kočevske Poljane
- Loška Vas
- Mali Rigelj
- Meniška Vas
- Nova Gora
- Občice
- Obrh
- Podhosta
- Podstenice
- Podturn pri Dolenjskih Toplicah
- Sela pri Dolenjskih Toplicah
- Selišče
- Soteska
- Stare Žage
- Suhor pri Dolenjskih Toplicah
- Veliki Rigelj
- Verdun pri Uršnih Selih
