= Dolenjske Toplice =

Dolenjske Toplice Toplice (until 1953)
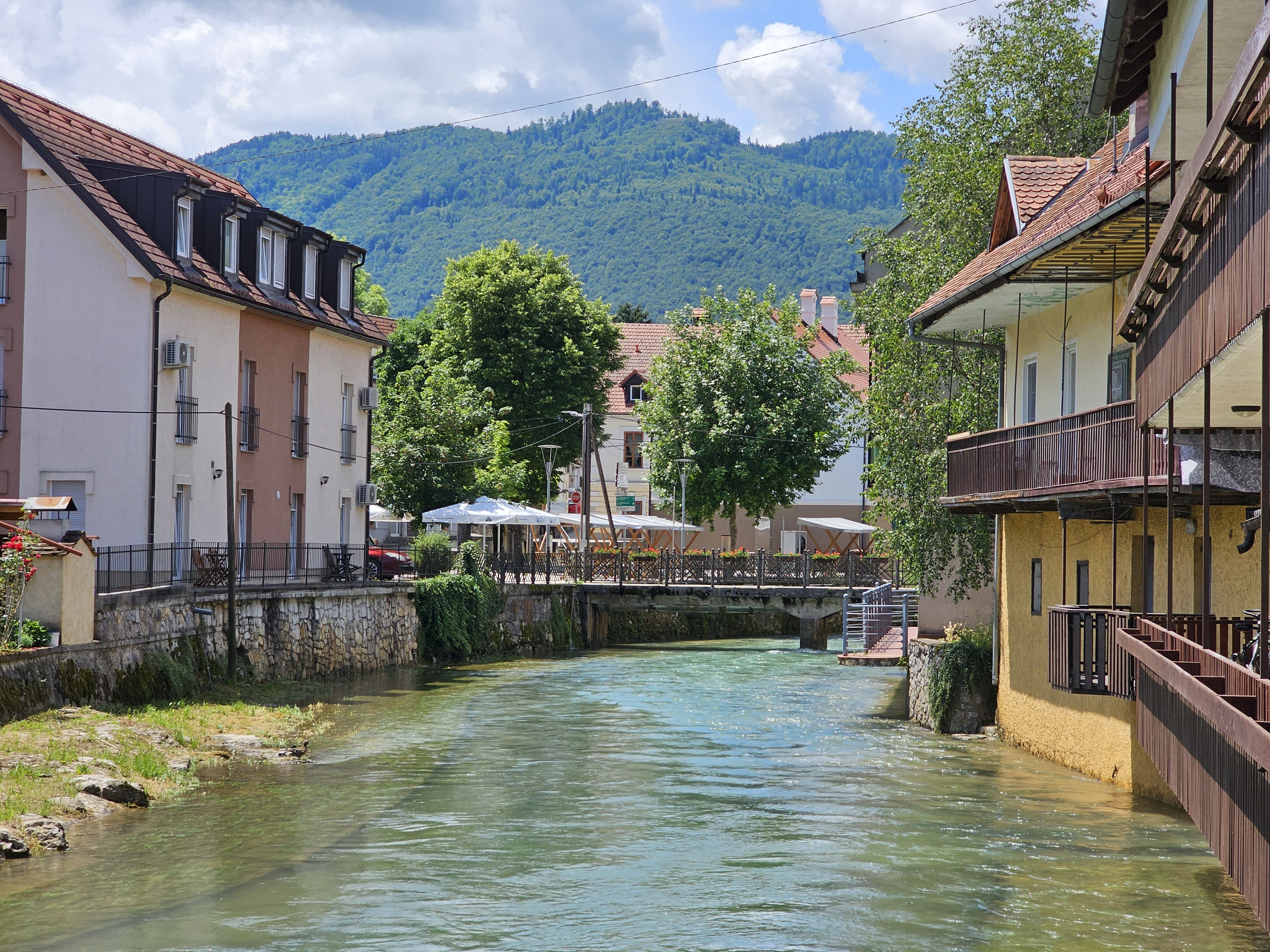

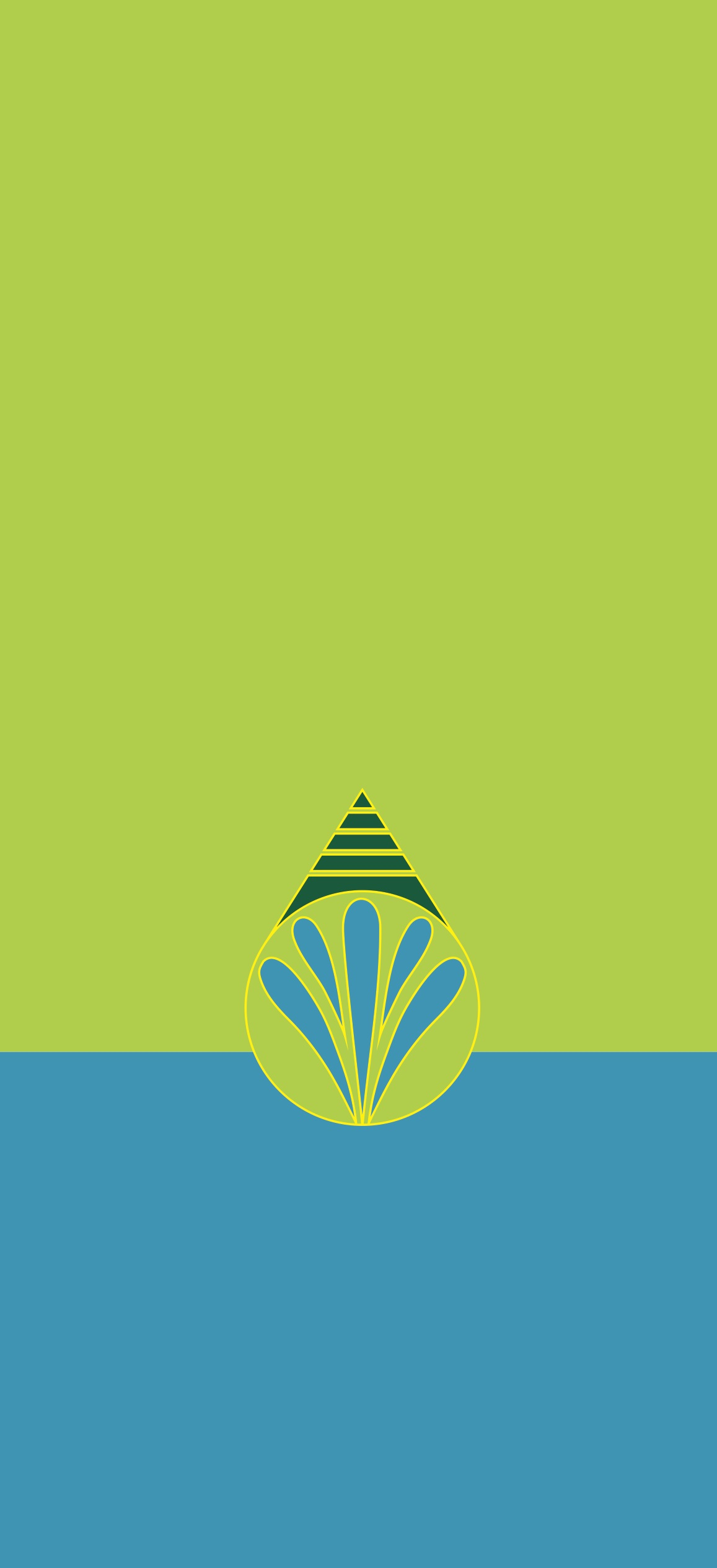
- Flag Coat of arms

- Location of the Town of Dolenjske Toplice in Slovenia
- Coordinates: 45°45′16.26″N 15°03′30.04″E
- Country: Slovenia
- Traditional region: Lower Carniola
- Statistical region: Southeast Slovenia
- Municipality: Dolenjske Toplice
- Elevation: 179.5 m (589 ft)

Population (2025)
  - Total: 979
- Time zone: UTC+01 (CET)
  - Summer (DST): UTC+02 (CEST)
- Postal code: 8350 Dolenjske Toplice

Dolenjske Toplice (pronounced [dɔˈleːnskɛ tɔˈpliːtsɛ]; German: Töplitz) is a settlement near Novo Mesto in southeastern Slovenia and is the seat of the Municipality of Dolenjske Toplice. The area is part of the traditional region of Lower Carniola. The municipality is now included in the Southeast Slovenia Statistical Region. The town lies on the Sušica River, which joins the Krka 2 km north of town. It is a spa town known for its thermal baths established in 1658 by the Counts of Auersperg. The settlement has a population of around 900.

== Name ==
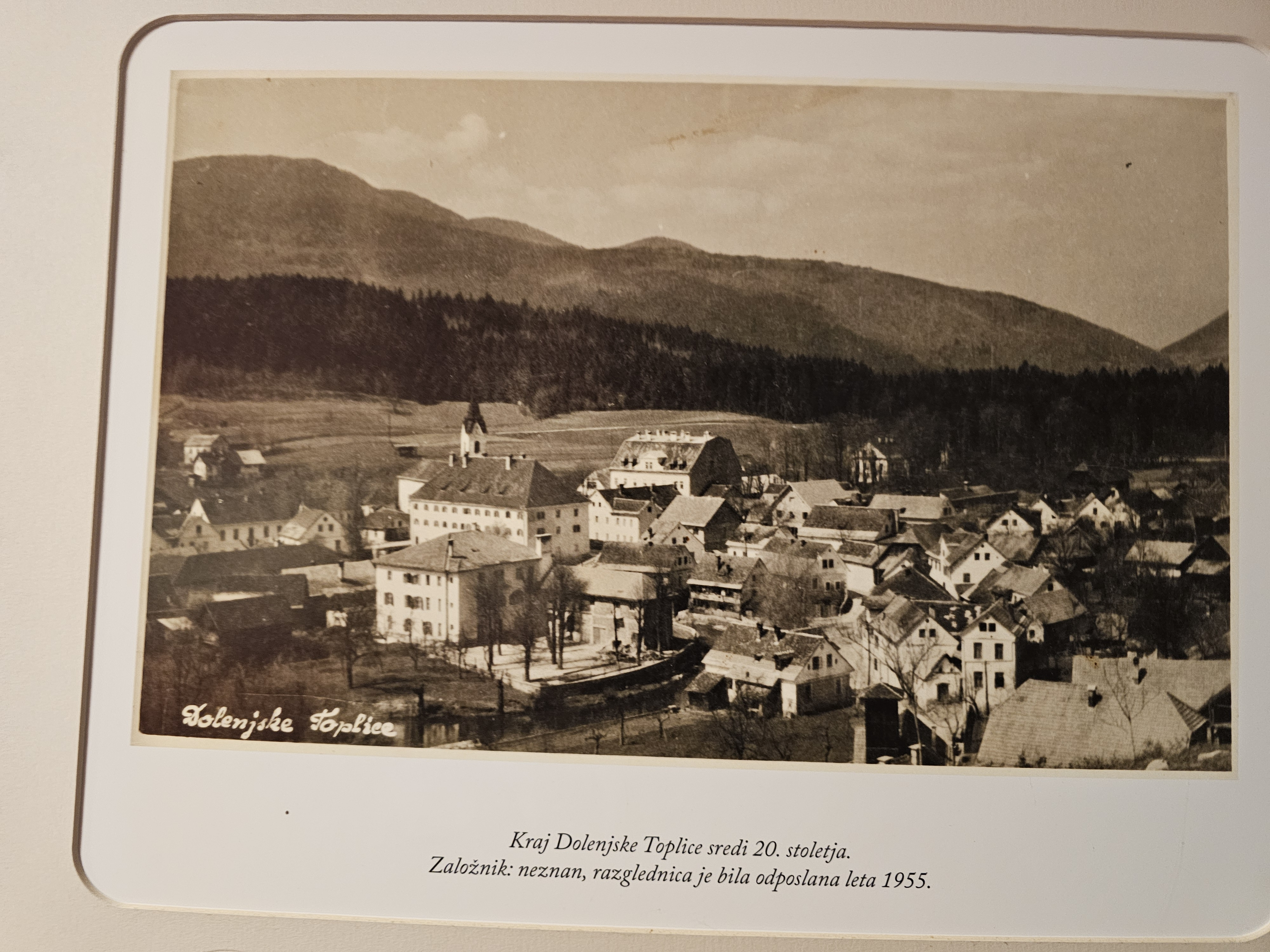

Dolenjske Toplice was attested in historical sources as Topliz in 1228 and Toplicz in 1328. The name of the settlement was changed from Toplice to Dolenjske Toplice in 1953. The historical German name was Töplitz. The name comes from the Slovene common noun toplica 'hot spring'.

== Church ==
The parish church in the settlement is dedicated to Saint Anne and belongs to the Roman Catholic Diocese of Novo Mesto. It is a Gothic building that was restyled in the Baroque in the late 17th century. The parish currently covers the parishes of Soteska, Kočevske Poljane, and Uršna Sela, which are without priests.

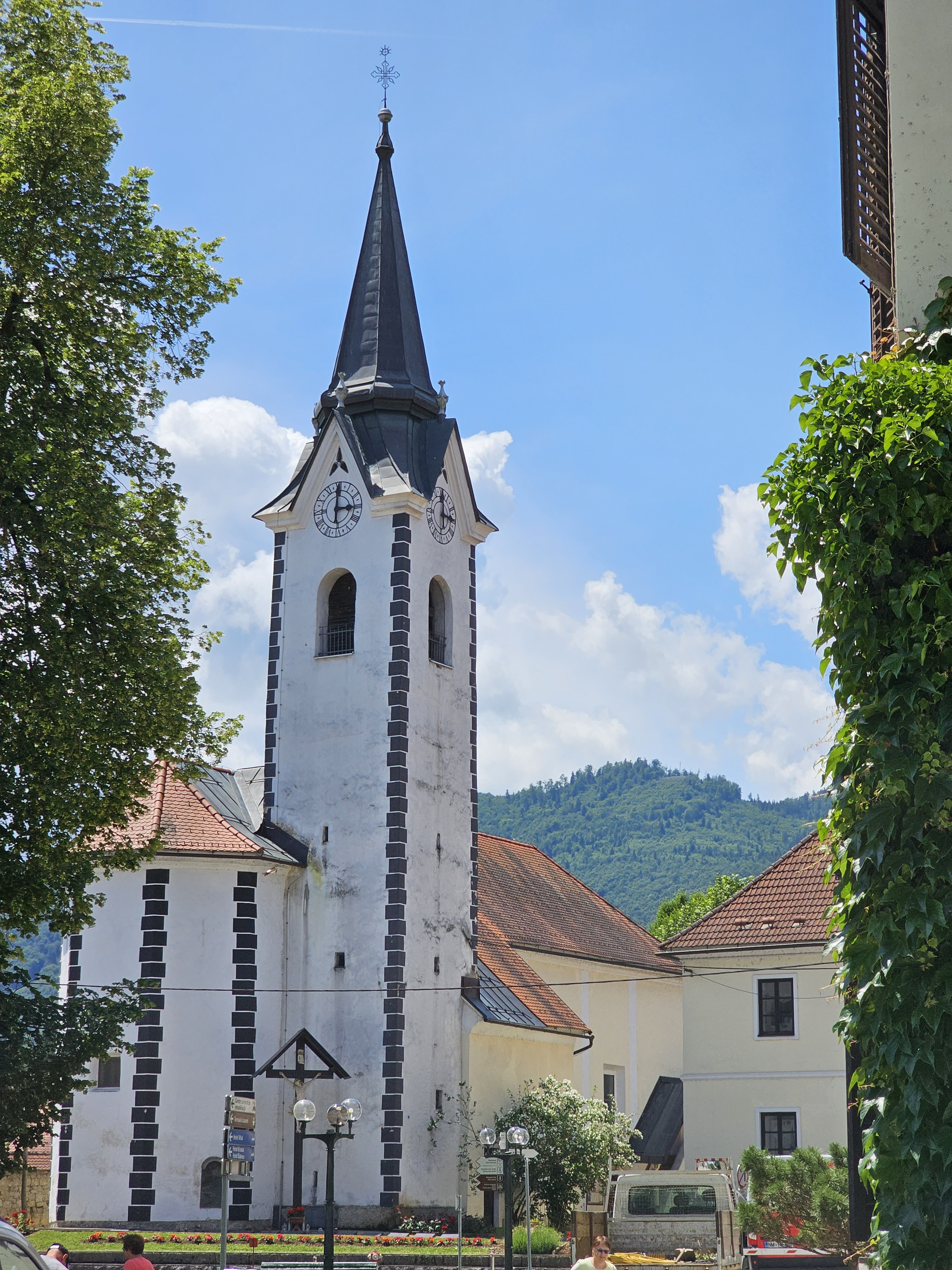
St. Anne's Church

== Spa ==
The village lies on several tectonic faults, where water can penetrate deep into the crust and heat up. This water has been well known for its healing abilities for hundreds of years. Today there is a spa built around these warm springs, which is the biggest business in the settlement. There are hotels, a wellness facility, and pools.

== Gallery ==
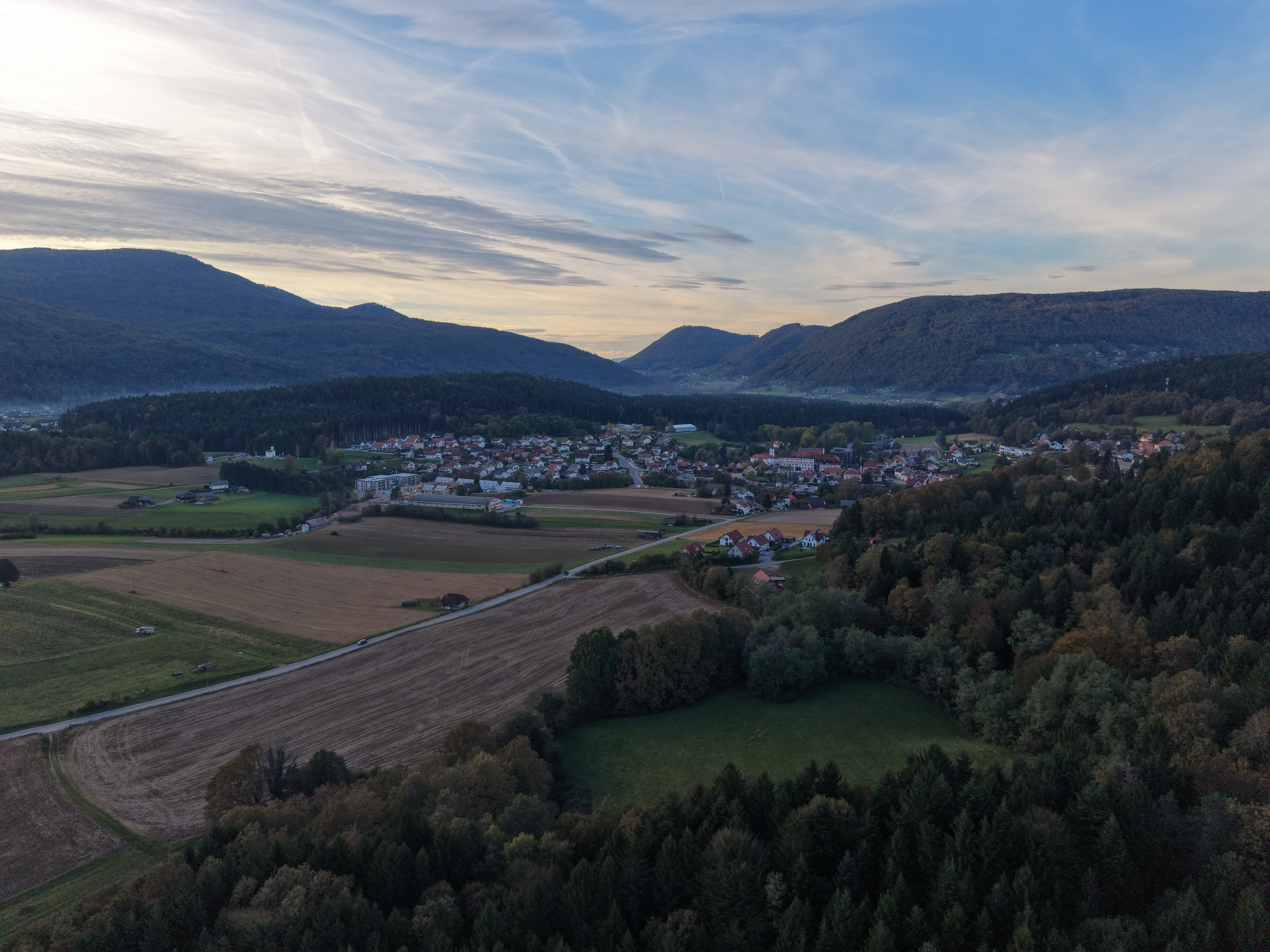
Dolenjske Toplice from the east

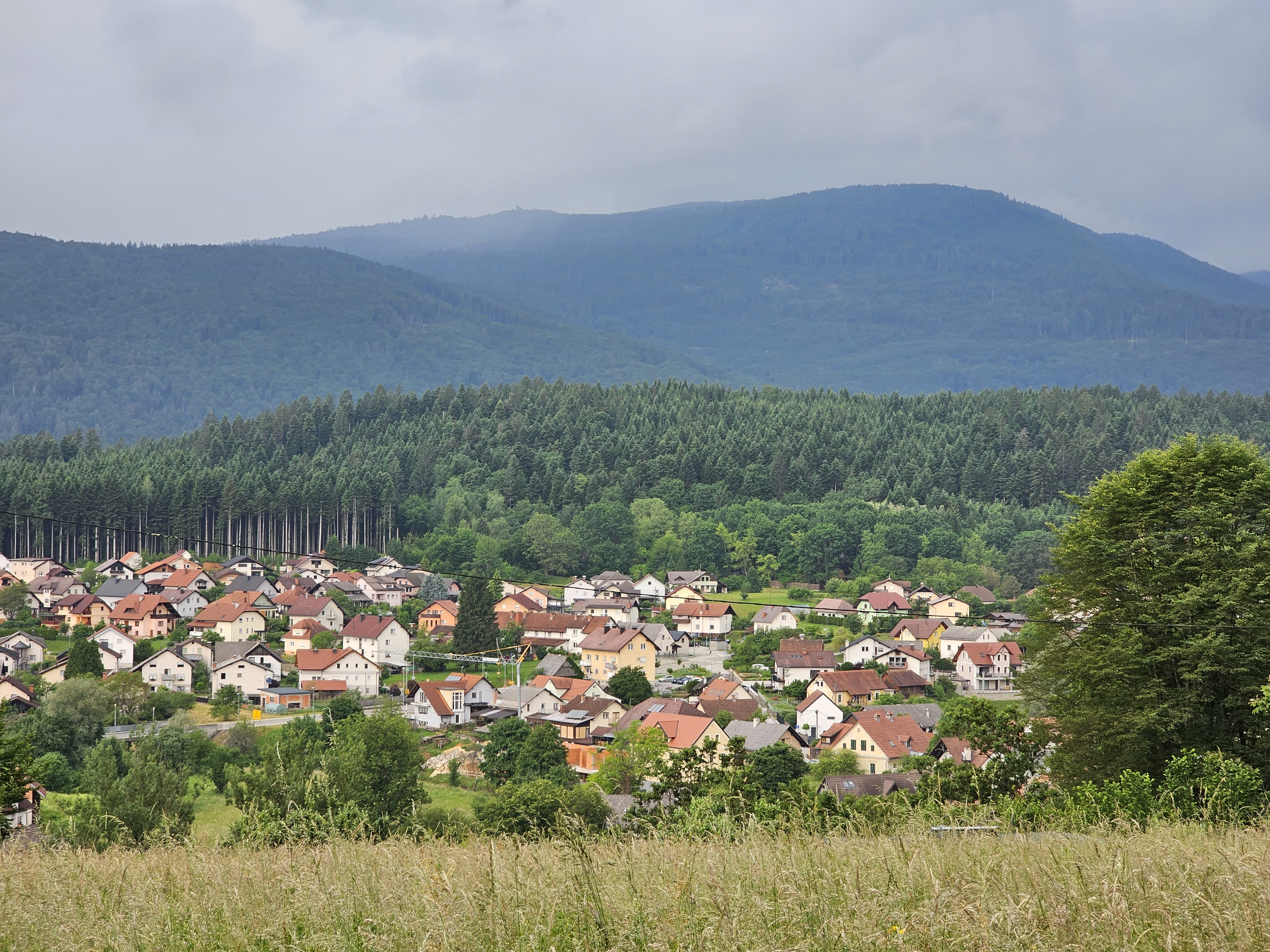
Dolenjske Toplice from the east

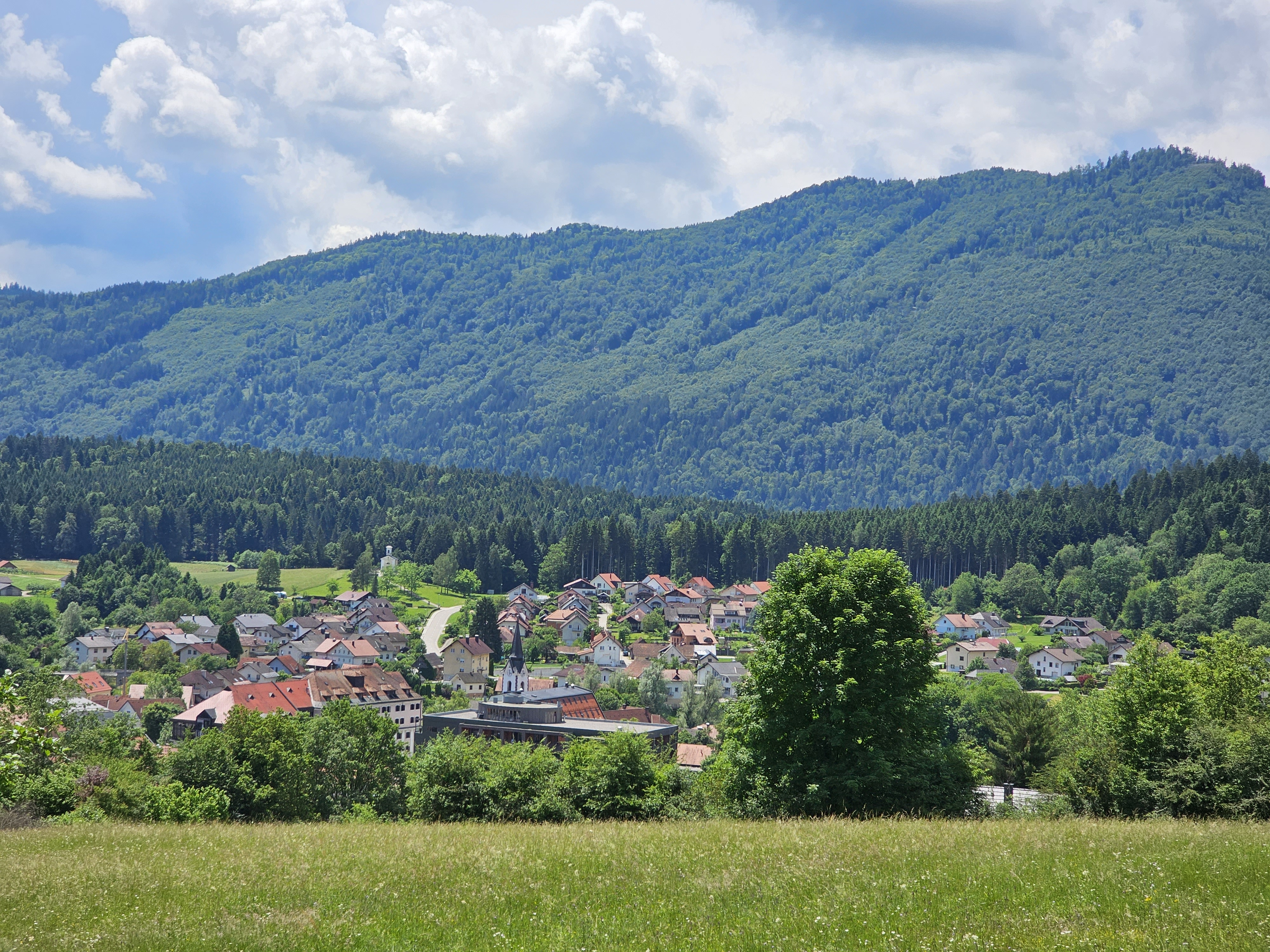
Dolenjske Toplice from the east

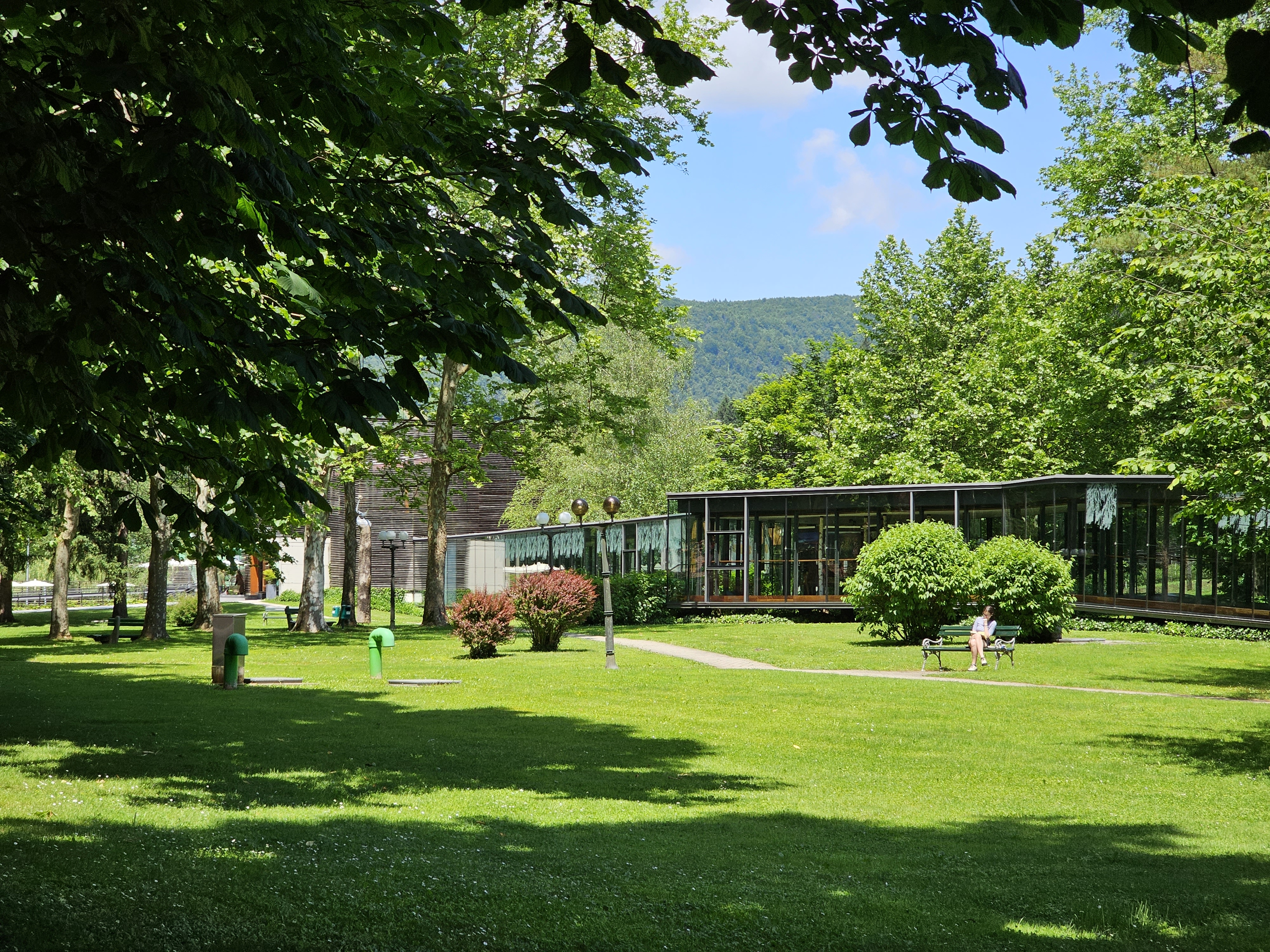
Park between hotels and wellness facility

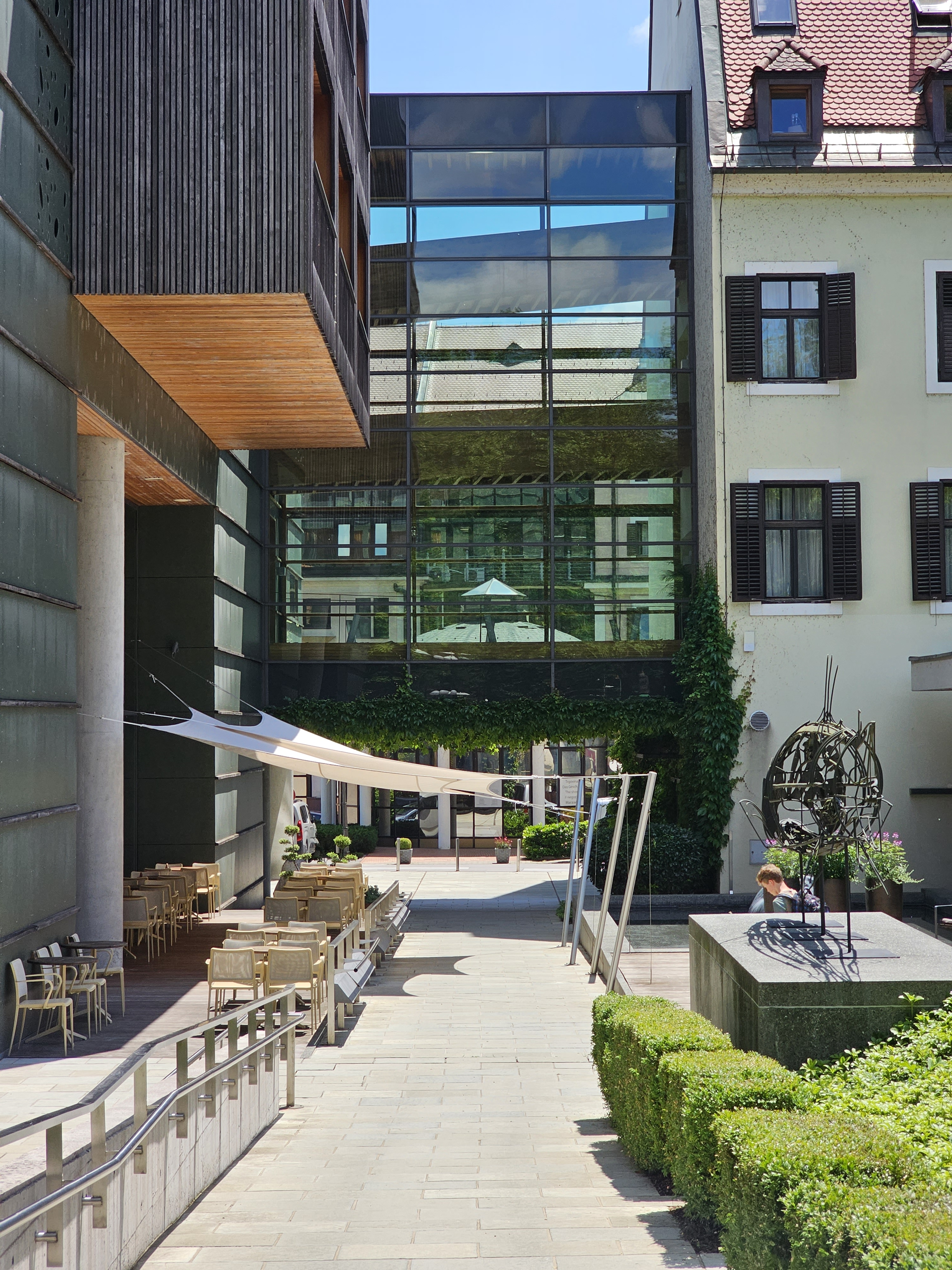
New and old hotel bridge

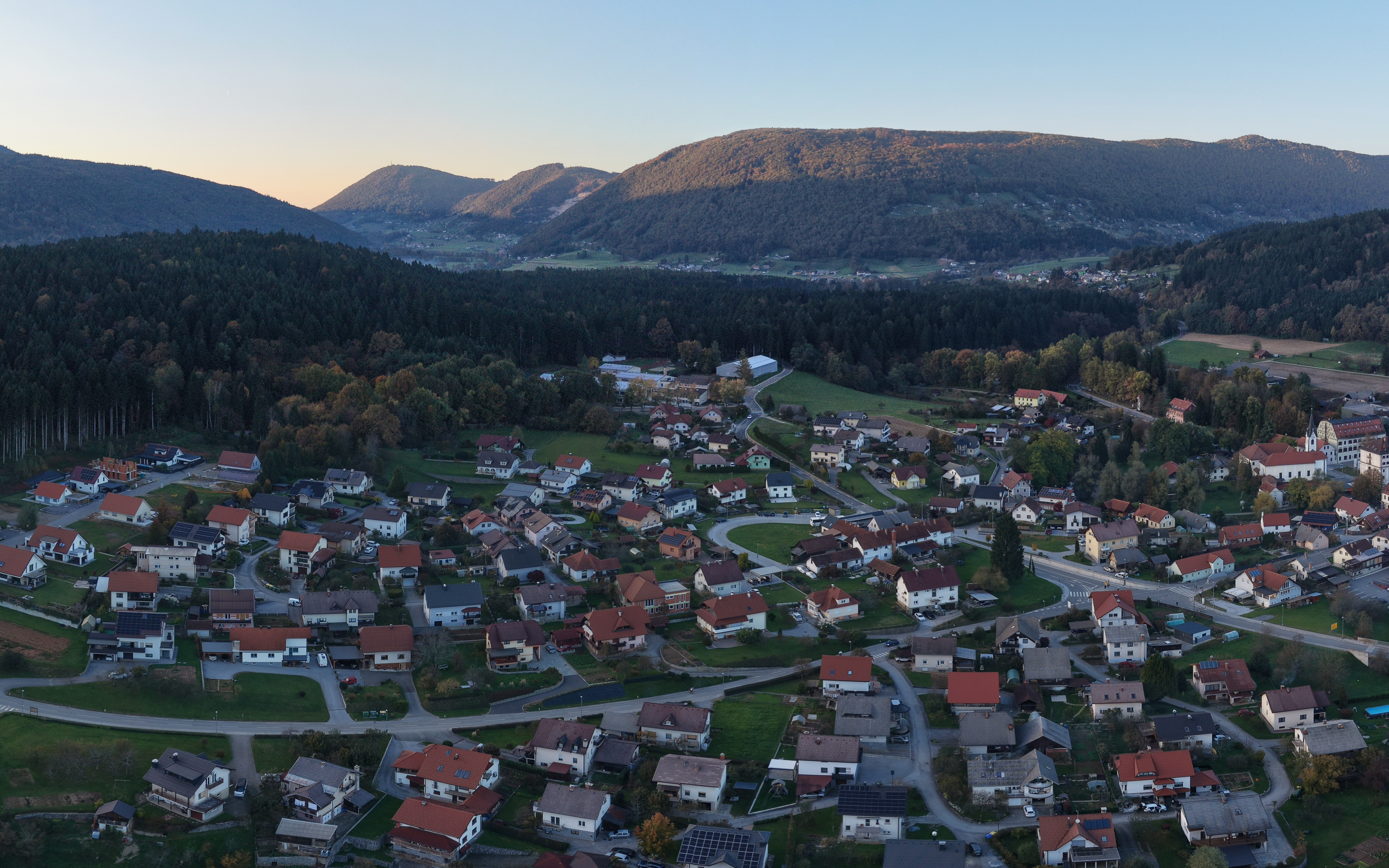
Dolenjske Toplice cvinger

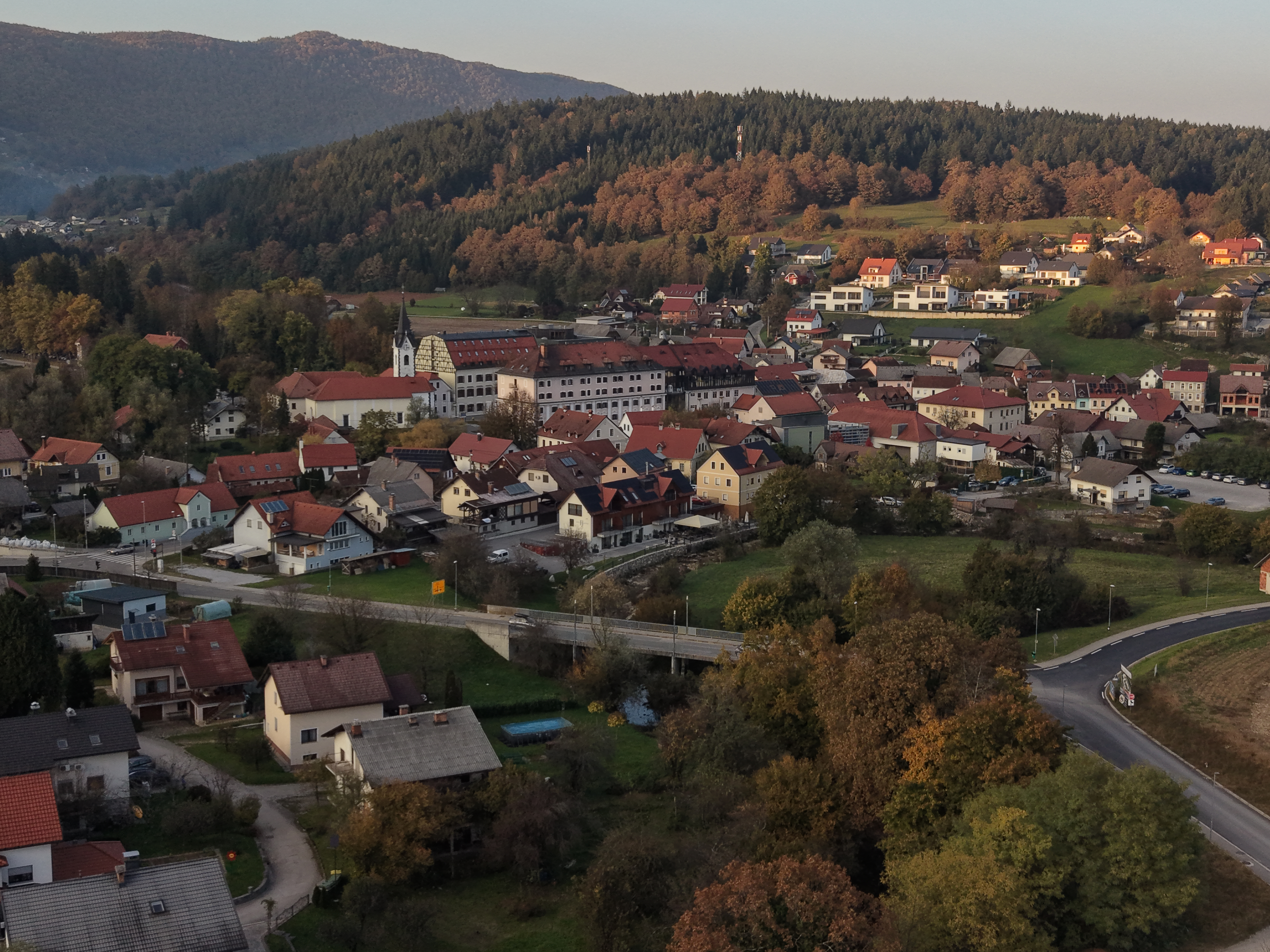
Center

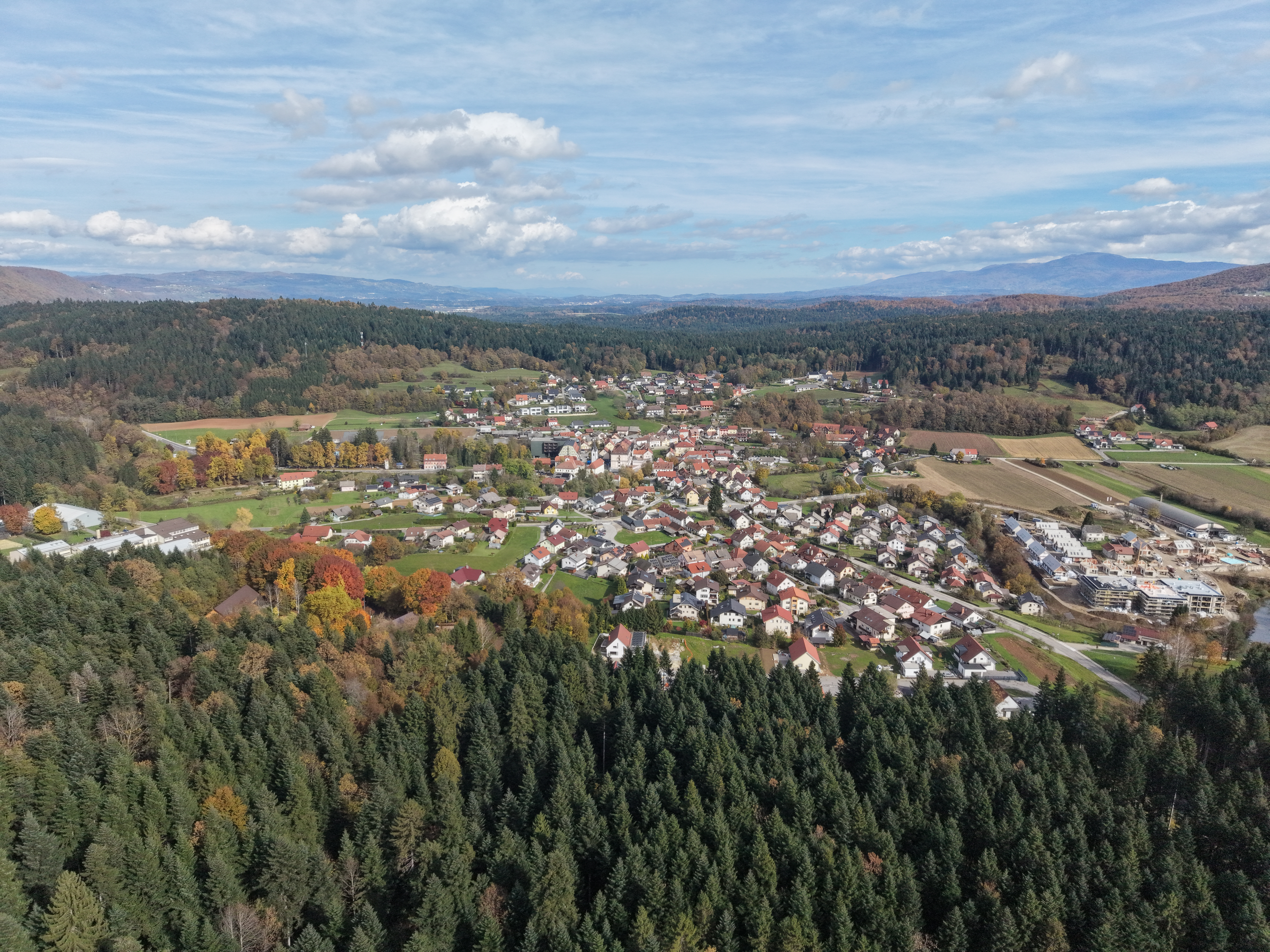
Dolenjske Toplice from the south
