= Lazec, Loški Potok =

Lazec
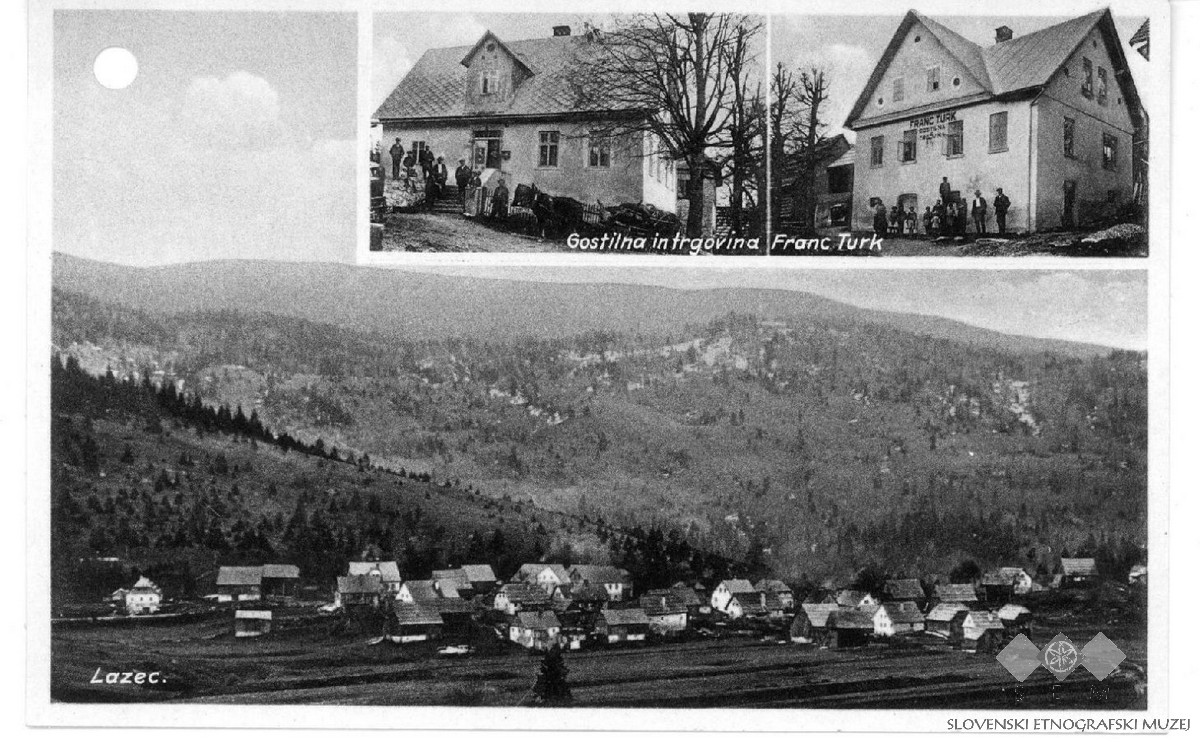
- Postcard of Lazec

- Location in Slovenia
- Coordinates: 45°39′2.67″N 14°37′59.39″E
- Country: Slovenia
- Traditional region: Lower Carniola
- Statistical region: Southeast Slovenia
- Municipality: Loški Potok

Area
  - Total: 6.22 km^{2} (2.40 sq mi)
- Elevation: 802.7 m (2,634 ft)

Population (2002)
  - Total: 36
- Postal code: 1319

Lazec (pronounced [ˈlaːzəts]; formerly also Laze; German: Gehack or Gehag (bei Obergrass), Gottschee German: Gəhack) is a village in the Municipality of Loški Potok in southern Slovenia, close to the border with Croatia. The area is part of the traditional region of Lower Carniola and is now included in the Southeast Slovenia Statistical Region. There is a pond along the road to Hrib–Loški Potok and another on the road to Stari Kot. The pond towards Stari Kot is walled and stands below Prištal Spring, which is also walled. Before the Second World War the pond was regularly cleaned and used for swimming by the locals. There are karst sinkholes near the pond below the road.

== Name ==
Lazec and toponyms like it (e.g., Laze, Novi Lazi, Ribčev Laz) are derived from the common Slovene noun laz 'clearing', thus referring to a local geographical feature. It was named by loggers that founded the settlement while clearing the forest. For the German name, cf. the common noun and microtoponym Gehack 'logged land, cleared land, lumbering'.

== History ==
Lazec was a Gottschee German village. Although the settlement was not listed in the Gottschee land registry of 1574 or in the 1770 census, it was mentioned by Johann Weikhard von Valvasor in 1689. In 1869 the village had 15 houses and a population of 78, and in 1880 a population of 89. No Slovene residents were recorded in the village until 1890. In 1931 Lazec had a population of 112, equally divided between ethnic Slovenes and Germans. The Gottschee German residents were evicted in November 1941, after which the Slovene population allied itself with the Partisans. On 11 August 1942, Italian forces transported all of the remaining men of the village to a concentration camp at Treviso. After the armistice between Italy and Allied armed forces, two families moved to Lazec from Stari Kot and one from Novi Kot.
