= Srednja Vas =

Srednja Vas may refer to several places in Slovenia:

- Srednja Vas, Radovljica
- Srednja Vas, Semič
- Srednja Vas–Goriče
- Srednja Vas (Lavrica)
- Srednja Vas–Loški Potok
- Srednja Vas–Poljane
- Srednja Vas pri Dragi
- Srednja Vas pri Kamniku
- Srednja Vas pri Polhovem Gradcu
- Srednja Vas pri Šenčurju
- Srednja Vas v Bohinju
