= Retje =

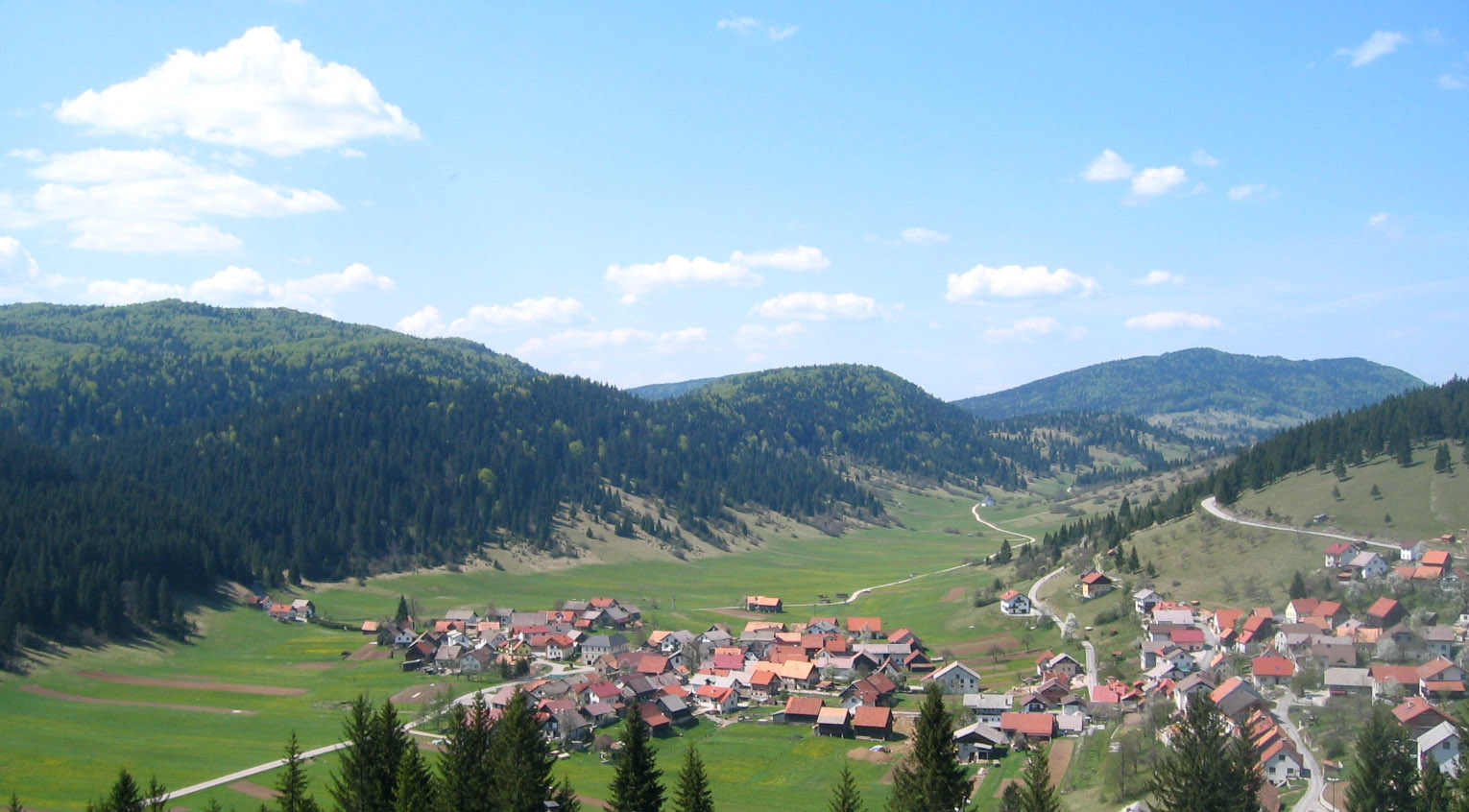

- Location in Slovenia
- Coordinates: 45°42′38.71″N 14°34′44.71″E
- Country: Slovenia
- Traditional region: Lower Carniola
- Statistical region: Southeast Slovenia
- Municipality: Loški Potok

Area
  - Total: 12.88 km^{2} (4.97 sq mi)
- Elevation: 723.2 m (2,373 ft)

Population (2019)
  - Total: 375
- Postal code: 1318

Retje (pronounced [ˈɾeːtjɛ]) is a village in the Municipality of Loški Potok in southern Slovenia. The area is part of the traditional region of Lower Carniola and is now included in the Southeast Slovenia Statistical Region.

== Mass graves ==
Retje is the site of two known mass graves associated with the Second World War. The Bezelj 1 Mass Grave (Slovene: Grobišče pri Bezlju 1) is located in the woods northeast of the village, east of the road to Sodražica. It contains the remains of five German prisoners of war that were brought from Mali Log and murdered here. The Bezelj 2 Mass Grave (Grobišče pri Bezlju 2) lies east of the first grave. It contains the remains of two Home Guard soldiers and three Russian Liberation Army soldiers.

== Church ==
The local church, built on an isolated spot further up the valley northwest of the main settlement, is dedicated to Saint Florian and belongs to the parish of Loški Potok. It is a Baroque building dating to the late 17th or early 18th century. It has an octagonal floor plan. The portal bears the date 1786, but this is most likely the date of its restoration.
