= Stari Kot =

- Location in Slovenia
- Coordinates: 45°37′0.26″N 14°38′13.58″E
- Country: Slovenia
- Traditional region: Lower Carniola
- Statistical region: Southeast Slovenia
- Municipality: Loški Potok

Area
  - Total: 5.02 km^{2} (1.94 sq mi)
- Elevation: 809.5 m (2,656 ft)

Population (2002)
  - Total: 11
- Postal code: 1319

Stari Kot (pronounced [ˈstaːɾi ˈkoːt]; in older sources also Stari Vinkelj, German: Altwinkel, Gottschee German: Autbinkl) is a village in the Municipality of Loški Potok in southern Slovenia, next to the border with Croatia. The area is part of the traditional region of Lower Carniola and is now included in the Southeast Slovenia Statistical Region. It consists of the hamlets of Binkl, Kurja Vas (Slovene: Kurja vas), Pri Ambrožiču, Hrib, and Preska (German: Preiche). The main road from Lazec to Prezid runs through the village.

== Name ==
The Slovene name Stari Kot and the German name Altwinkel are semantically equivalent, both meaning 'old closed valley', referring to the end of a valley where it meets the mountains. The designation 'old' (Stari, Alt-) distinguishes the settlement from Novi Kot (German: Neuwinkel) (literally, 'new closed valley.'). Traditionally, the people of Stari Kot and Novi Kot were nicknamed Bajtarji (literally, 'tenant farmers'), but this nickname is rarely used today.

== History ==
Oral tradition indicates that Stari Kot was founded around 1700. The village had 32 houses in 1770 and had a minority Gottschee German population. The men traditionally performed seasonal work in the forests of Croatia, Hungary, and elsewhere. A part-time school was founded in the village in 1904, and a separate school building was built in 1910. During the Second World War, on 19 April 1942 the men of the village joined the Partisans en masse. On 29 July 1942 Italian forces burned the entire village and removed the population to concentration camps. After the war some of the villagers settled in neighboring villages and others rebuilt their houses with the assistance of the recovery association in Draga. The prewar/postwar number of houses in the village's hamlets were Binkl (11/6), Kurja Vas (4/2), Pri Ambrožiču (3/2), Hrib (2/1), and Preska (2/1).

== Church ==
The local church is built on a hill west of the village next to the cemetery. It is dedicated to Saint Francis Xavier and belongs to the Parish of Draga. It is a late Baroque building that contains three 19th-century wooden altars. It was consecrated before 1740, but the building's current architecture dates from circa 1900. It has a single entry through the bell tower. The church is registered as cultural heritage.

== Other cultural heritage ==
In addition to the church, two other structures in Stari Kot are registered as cultural heritage:

- There is a roadside chapel in the western part of the village. It is a square structure with a metal gabled roof. The entrance is accentuated with pilasters and an arched door casing. It dates from the first half of the 20th century.
- A monument to two unknown Partisans that fell in 1943 stands in the village cemetery, surrounding the church. The monument was erected in 1966 in the southwest corner of the cemetery. It is a stone pyramid with a stylized representation of Mount Triglav and it has a granite plaque with an inscription.
