= Black One =

Black One may refer to:

- Kali or Kālikā, a Hindu goddess
- Black One (album), by Sunn O))), 2005
- The Black Ones, a predecessor of South African male choral group Ladysmith Black Mambazo
- Black One, a character in Italian science fiction action film 2020 Texas Gladiators

== See also ==
- Aphrodite, an ancient Greek goddess, one epithet for whom was Melainis ('Black One')
- Bugg-Shash, or the Black One, a Cthulhu Mythos deity
- Chort, an anthropomorphic demon of total evil of doom
- Črnec (disambiguation), Slovene and Kajkavian Croatian terms
- Dampa Sangye (died 1117), descriptive name Nakpopa ('Black One'), a Buddhist mahasiddha
- de Zwart, a Dutch surname, meaning "the black (one)"
- ES Sétif, nicknamed El Kahla ('the Black One'), an Algerian football club
- Mercedes Sosa (1935–2009), sometimes known as La Negra ('the Black One'), an Argentine singer
- One kreuzer black, or Schwarzer Einser ('Black One'), the first postage stamp in the Kingdom of Bavaria
- "The Pool of the Black One" a fantasy short story by Robert E. Howard
- Ulf Kirsten (born 4 December 1965), German footballer and manager, nicknamed Der Schwatte ('the Black One')
