= Pungert =

Pungert may refer to several places in Slovenia:

- Pungert, Ivančna Gorica, a settlement in the Municipality of Ivančna Gorica
- Pungert, Loški Potok, a settlement in the Municipality of Loški Potok
- Pungert, Škofja Loka, a settlement in the Municipality of Škofja Loka
- Pungrt, Gabrje pri Stični, a hamlet of Gabrje pri Stični, also known as Pungert
