= Mali Lug =

- Village
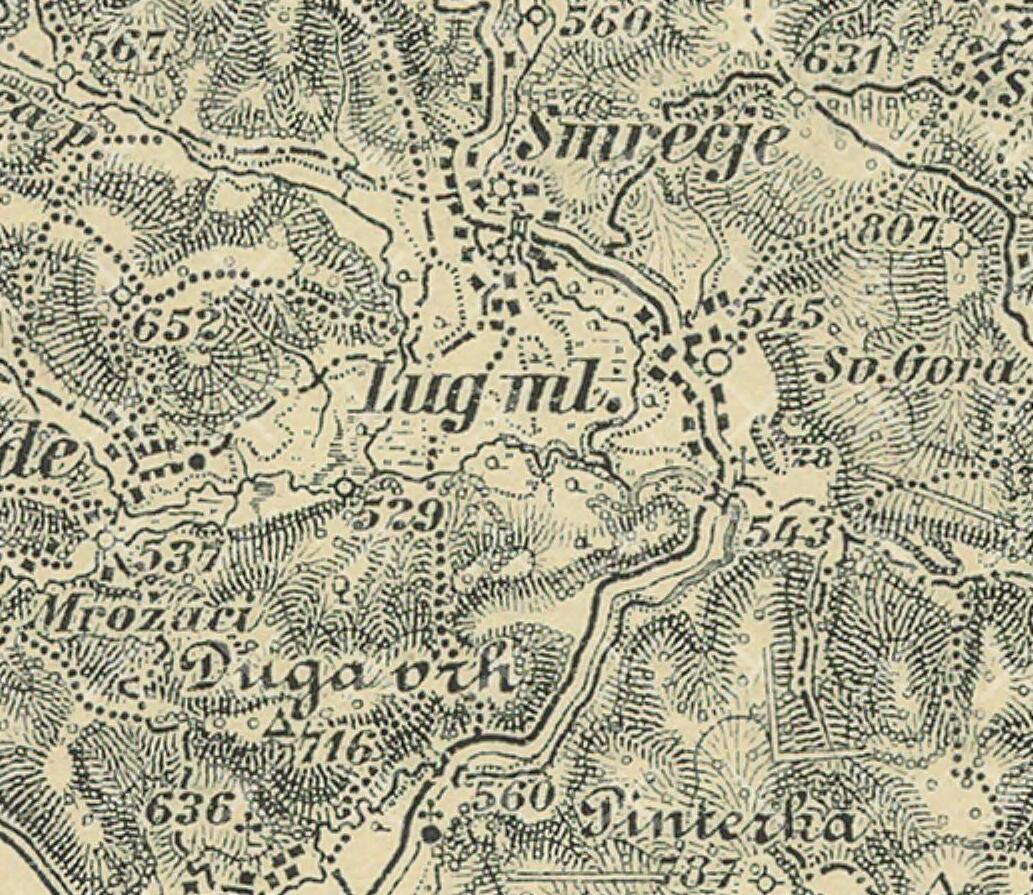
- Mali Lug (as Lug ml.) in 1908

- Location within Croatia
- Coordinates: 45°31′N 14°39′E
- Country: Croatia
- County: Primorje-Gorski Kotar County

Area
  - Total: 4.0 km^{2} (1.5 sq mi)

Population (2021)
  - Total: 62
  - Density: 15/km^{2} (40/sq mi)
- Time zone: UTC+1 (CET)
  - Summer (DST): UTC+2 (CEST)

Mali Lug is a village located in Croatia's Primorje-Gorski Kotar County. It is connected by the D32 highway.

There is an intermittent lake by Mali Lug, (Note: Not to be confused with the intermittent lake in the Mali lug sinkhole by Ponikve Bakarske, or with the intermittent lake near Travnik on Loški potok south of Mali Log.) north of the ponor of the river Gerovčica.

It is traditionally regarded as the birth place of the legendary Petar Klepac.

== Notable people ==
Notable people that were born or lived in Mali Lug include:

- Petar Klepac, legendary figure

== Nature ==
The 91 metres (299 ft) long Kalvaria on the Sveta gora near Mali Lug dates to the 17th/18th century, and was protected in 1834.
