= Sveti Janez, Bohinj =

Sveti Janez
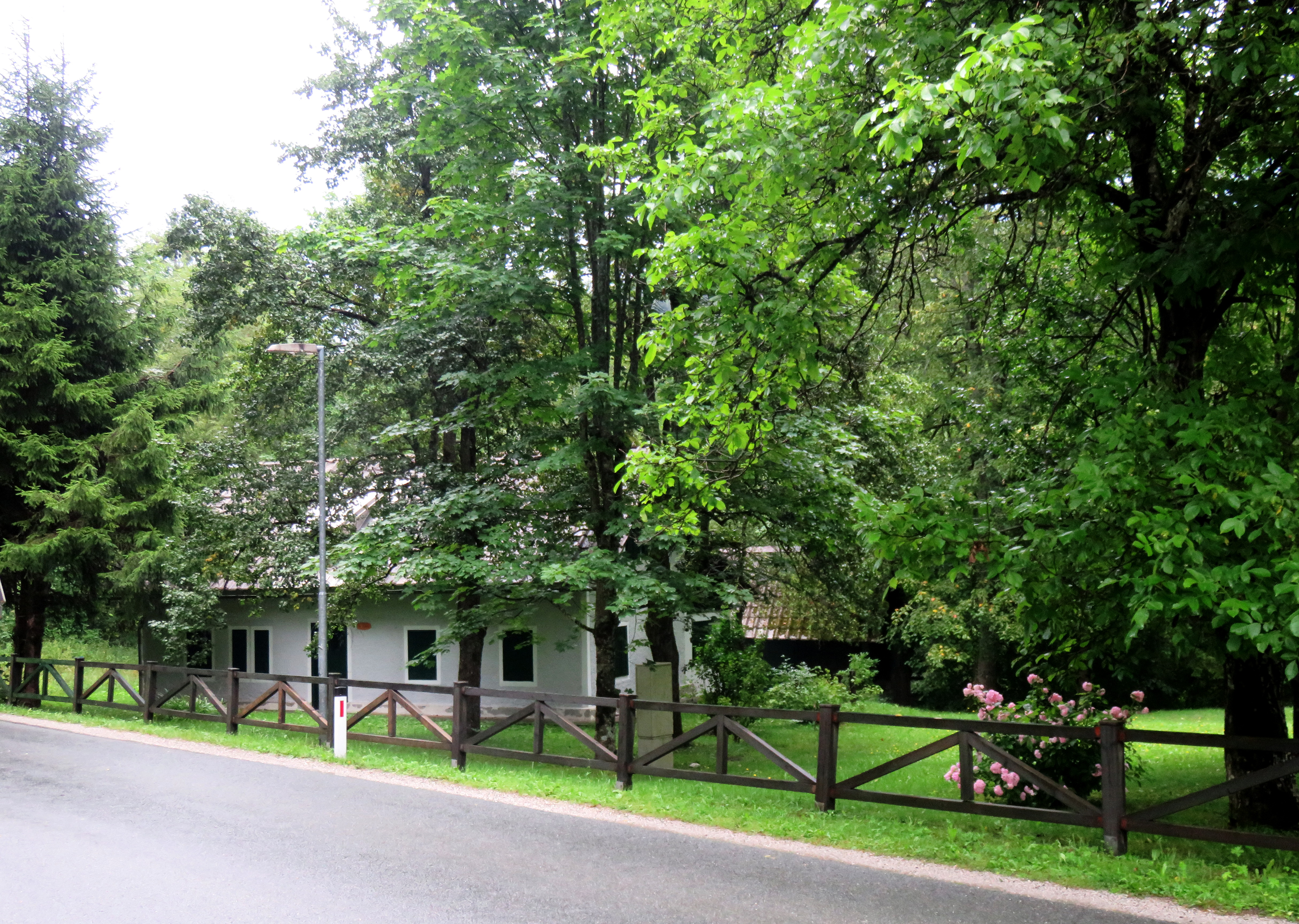

- Location in Slovenia
- Coordinates: 46°16′45″N 13°53′13″E
- Country: Slovenia
- Traditional region: Upper Carniola
- Statistical region: Upper Carniola
- Municipality: Bohinj
- Elevation: 530 m (1,740 ft)

Sveti Janez (pronounced [ˈsʋeːti ˈjaːnɛs], German: Sankt Johann am See) is a former village in the Municipality of Bohinj. It is now part of the village of Ribčev Laz. It is part of the traditional region of Upper Carniola and is now included in the Upper Carniola Statistical Region.

== Geography ==
Sveti Janez is located in a clearing on a terrace above Lake Bohinj.

== Name ==
The name Sveti Janez means 'Saint John' and refers to the church on the lakeshore in the settlement.

== History ==
Together with Sveti Duh and Ribčev Laz, Sveti Janez was historically part of the village of Polje. A lakeside hotel was built in the settlement in the 19th century. Sveti Janez was primarily a summer vacation settlement in the first half of the 20th century. Sveti Janez was deemed annexed by Polje in 1952, ending any existence it had as a separate settlement.

== Church ==
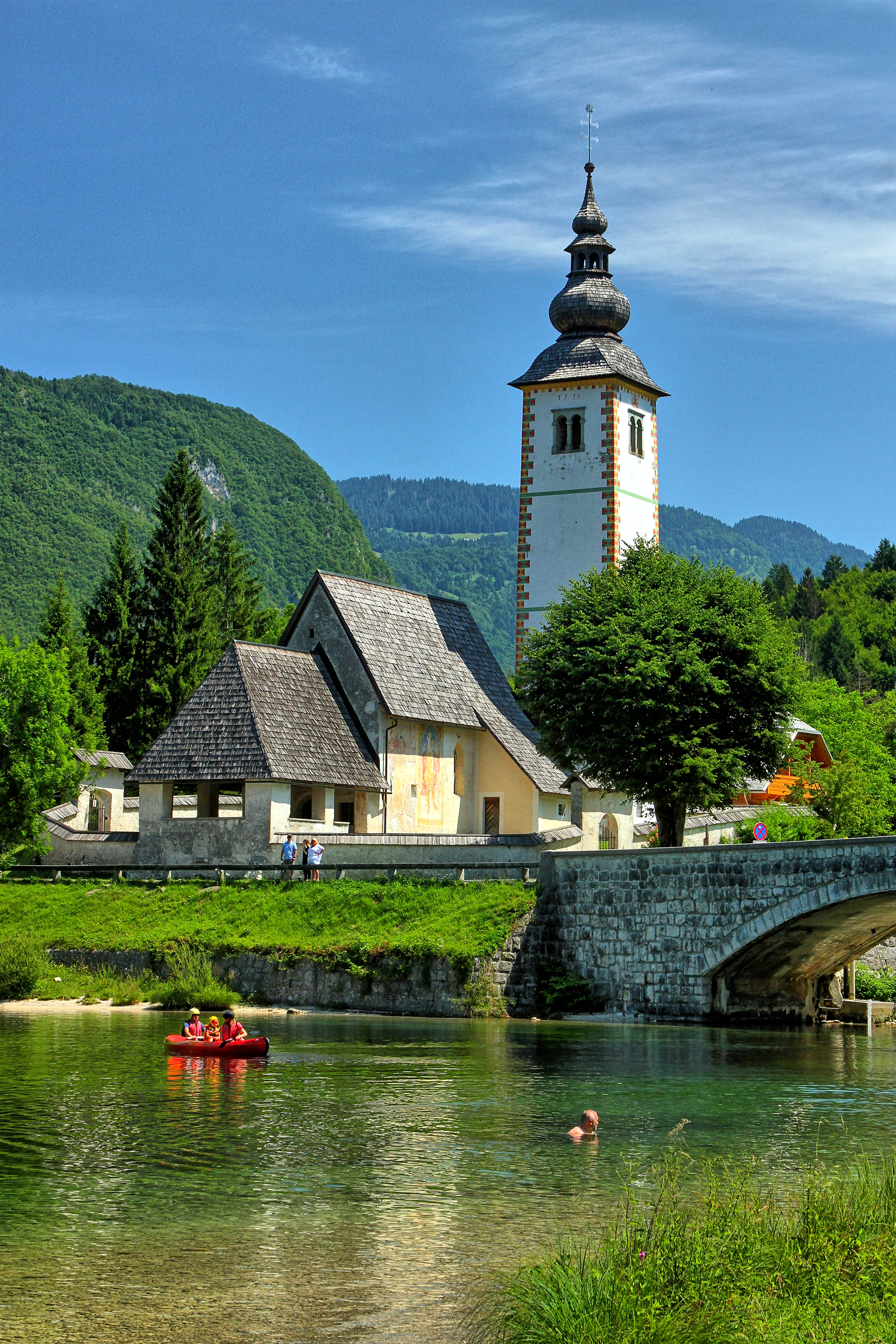
Saint John the Baptist Church

The church in Sveti Janez is dedicated to the John the Baptist and stands on the east shore of Lake Bohinj. The church was originally built in the Gothic style, and it has an open portico and a bell tower with a Baroque roof. The church is a single-naved structure with gilded altars, and it was painted with Gothic frescoes multiple times.
