= Črni Potok, Trebnje =

Črni Potok
- Location in Slovenia
- Coordinates: 45°56′23″N 14°59′39″E
- Country: Slovenia
- Traditional region: Lower Carniola
- Statistical region: Southeast Slovenia
- Municipality: Trebnje
- Elevation: 318 m (1,043 ft)

Črni Potok (pronounced [ˈtʃəɾni ˈpɔːtɔk], German: Schwarzenbach) is a former village in eastern Slovenia in the Municipality of Trebnje. It is now part of the village of Blato. It is part of the traditional region of Lower Carniola and is now included in the Southeast Slovenia Statistical Region.

== Geography ==
Črni Potok lies northwest of the village center of Blato at the headwaters of Cedilnica Creek. It lies to the west of and above the Zajka Valley, which Zajka Creek flows through.

== Name ==
The name Črni Potok literally means 'black creek', semantically corresponding to the German name Schwarzenbach, and it was originally a hydronym. Like similar names of streams (e.g., Črna and Črnec), the semantic motivation for the name is a creek that flows through a dark soil (i.e., non-gravel) bed or that carries dark, turbid water.

== History ==
Črni Potok was annexed by Blato in 1953, ending its existence as a separate settlement.
