= Haseney =

Haseney is a surname. Notable people with the surname include:

- Johann Peter Haseney (1812–1869), German engraver
- Sebastian Haseney (born 1978), German Nordic combined skier
