= Črni Potok =

Črni Potok (lit. 'Black Creek' in Slovene) may refer to:

- Črni Potok pri Dragi, a village in Loški Potok, Slovenia
- Črni Potok pri Kočevju, a village in Kočevje, Slovenia
- Črni Potok pri Velikih Laščah, a village in Velike Lašče, Slovenia
- Črni Potok, Šmartno pri Litiji, a village in Šmartno pri Litiji, Slovenia
- Črni Potok, Trebnje, a village in Trebinje, Slovenia

== See also ==
- Crni Potok, Croatian form
