= Sveti Duh, Bohinj =

Sveti Duh
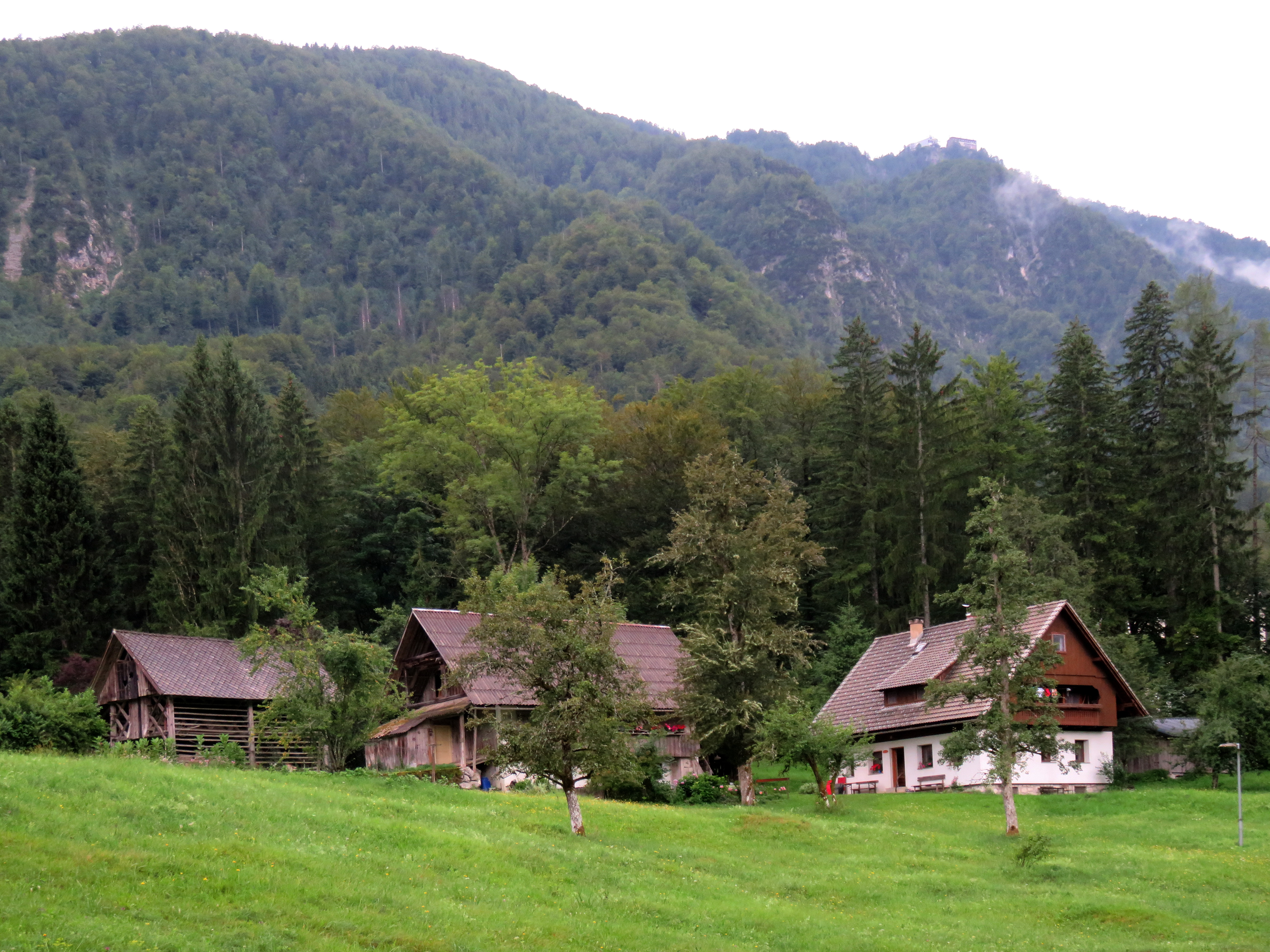

- Location in Slovenia
- Coordinates: 46°16′40″N 13°51′51″E
- Country: Slovenia
- Traditional region: Upper Carniola
- Statistical region: Upper Carniola
- Municipality: Bohinj
- Elevation: 527 m (1,729 ft)

Sveti Duh (pronounced [ˈsʋeːti ˈduːx], German: Heiligengeist) is a former village in the Municipality of Bohinj. It is now part of the village of Ribčev Laz. It is part of the traditional region of Upper Carniola and is now included in the Upper Carniola Statistical Region.

== Geography ==
Sveti Duh is located in a clearing on a terrace above Lake Bohinj. There is a creek in Sveti Duh, but it is dry most of the year.

== Name ==
The name Sveti Duh means 'Holy Spirit' and refers to the church on the lakeshore below the settlement.

== History ==
Together with Sveti Janez and Ribčev Laz, Sveti Duh was historically part of the village of Polje. A lakeside hotel was built immediately east of the settlement in 1896; known as Hotel pod Voglom (Mount Vogel Hostel) or Hotel Sv. Duh (Sveti Duh Hotel), it is now part of a hostel (Hostel pod Voglom). Sveti Duh had a permanent population of four (in one house) in 1900, and it was primarily a summer vacation settlement in the first half of the 20th century. Sveti Duh was deemed annexed by Ribčev Laz in 1953, ending any existence it had as a separate settlement.

== Church ==
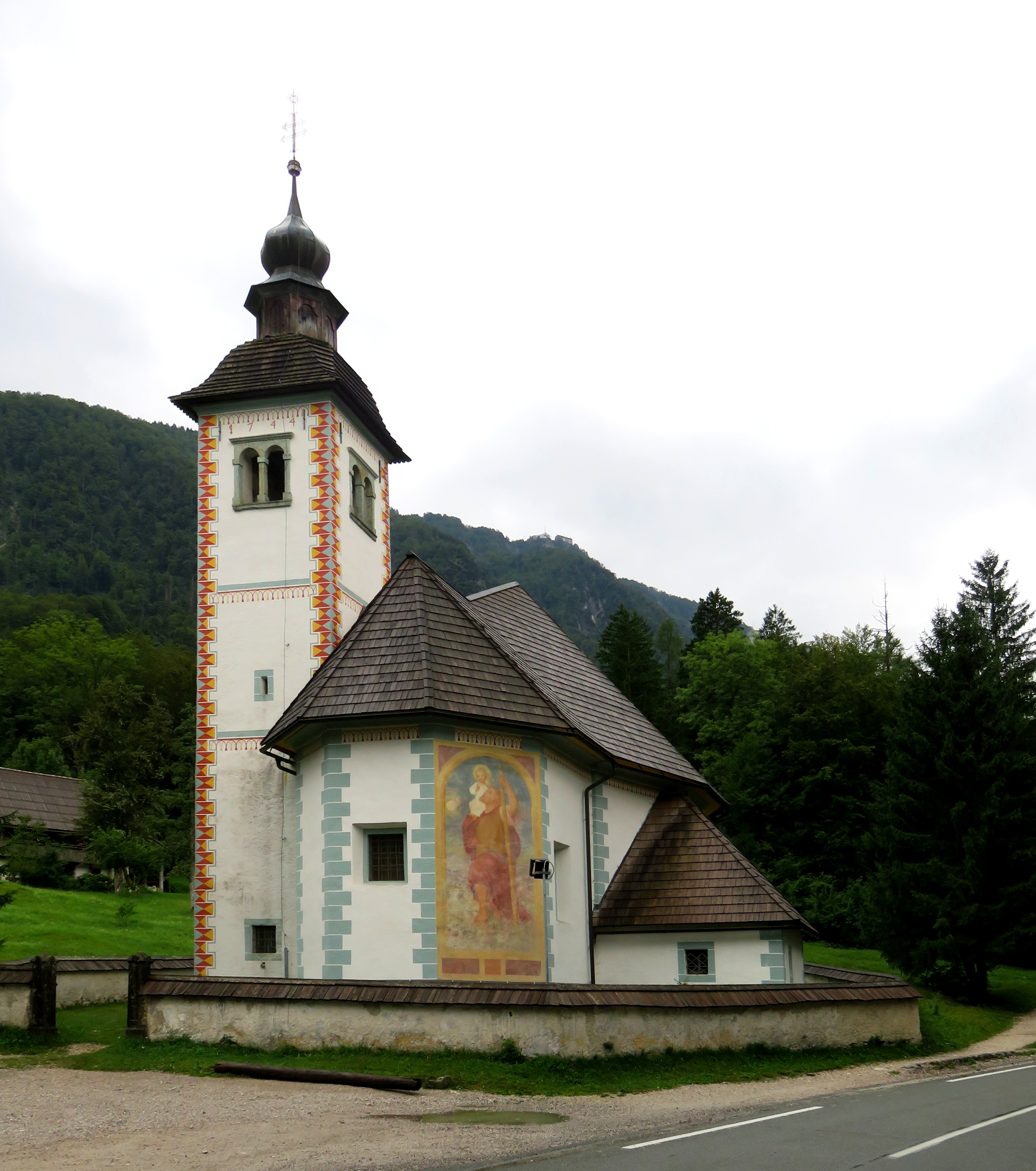
Holy Spirit Church

The church in Sveti Duh is dedicated to the Holy Spirit. A church was first mentioned at the site in historical sources in the 15th century, and the current structure was built in 1743–1744. The paintings in the church were created by Matija Koželj (1842–1917) in 1885.
