= Crni Potok =

Crni Potok (lit. 'Black Creek' in Croatian) may refer to:

- Crni Potok, Topusko, a village in Topusko, Croatia
- Crni Potok (Vitunjčica), a tributary of the Vitunjčica, a tributary of the Gornja Dobra
- Crni potok, a tributary of the Glina

== See also ==
- Črni Potok, Slovenian form
