= Crnac =

Crnac may refer to:

- Crnač, a village near Kakanj, Bosnia and Herzegovina
- Crnac, Virovitica-Podravina County, a village and a municipality in Croatia
- Crnac, Sisak-Moslavina County, a village near Sisak, Croatia
- Ante Crnac (born 2003), a Croatian professional footballer

== See also ==
- Crnec
