= Trava, Loški Potok =

Trava
- Location in Slovenia
- Coordinates: 45°36′10.1″N 14°40′16.66″E
- Country: Slovenia
- Traditional region: Lower Carniola
- Statistical region: Southeast Slovenia
- Municipality: Loški Potok

Area
  - Total: 8.22 km^{2} (3.17 sq mi)
- Elevation: 775 m (2,543 ft)

Population (2002)
  - Total: 25
- Postal code: 1319

Trava (pronounced [ˈtɾaːʋa]; German: Obergrass or Obergraß) is a village in the Municipality of Loški Potok in southern Slovenia. The area is part of the traditional region of Lower Carniola and is now included in the Southeast Slovenia Statistical Region.

== Church ==
The local church was a chapel of ease dedicated to Lawrence of Rome. It was first mentioned in written documents dating to 1526 and was one of the oldest churches in the Parish of Osilnica. Some sources indicate that defensive walls stood around the church to protect against Ottoman raids; no trace of these walls remain today. The church stood in the middle of the village cemetery; it had a rectangular nave and an octagonal chancel walled on three sides. A square belfry stood on the north side of the building and the sacristy stood on the south side between the nave and chancel.

The present-day ruins date from a rebuilding of the church in the 17th century. The church was assigned to the newly founded Parish of Draga in 1834. The building was reworked at the end of the 19th century with the addition of the belfry, the sacristy, and new windows; the interior was also newly vaulted at this time, and the year 1894 was carved into the stone door casing. The church was covered by a gabled shingled roof. The church was burned down by the Partisans on 22 July 1942. It was not rebuilt after the war; the ruins include the partially preserved tower of the belfry.
