= Municipality of Loški Potok =

Municipality of Slovenia

Municipality of Loški Potok Občina Loški Potok
- Municipality
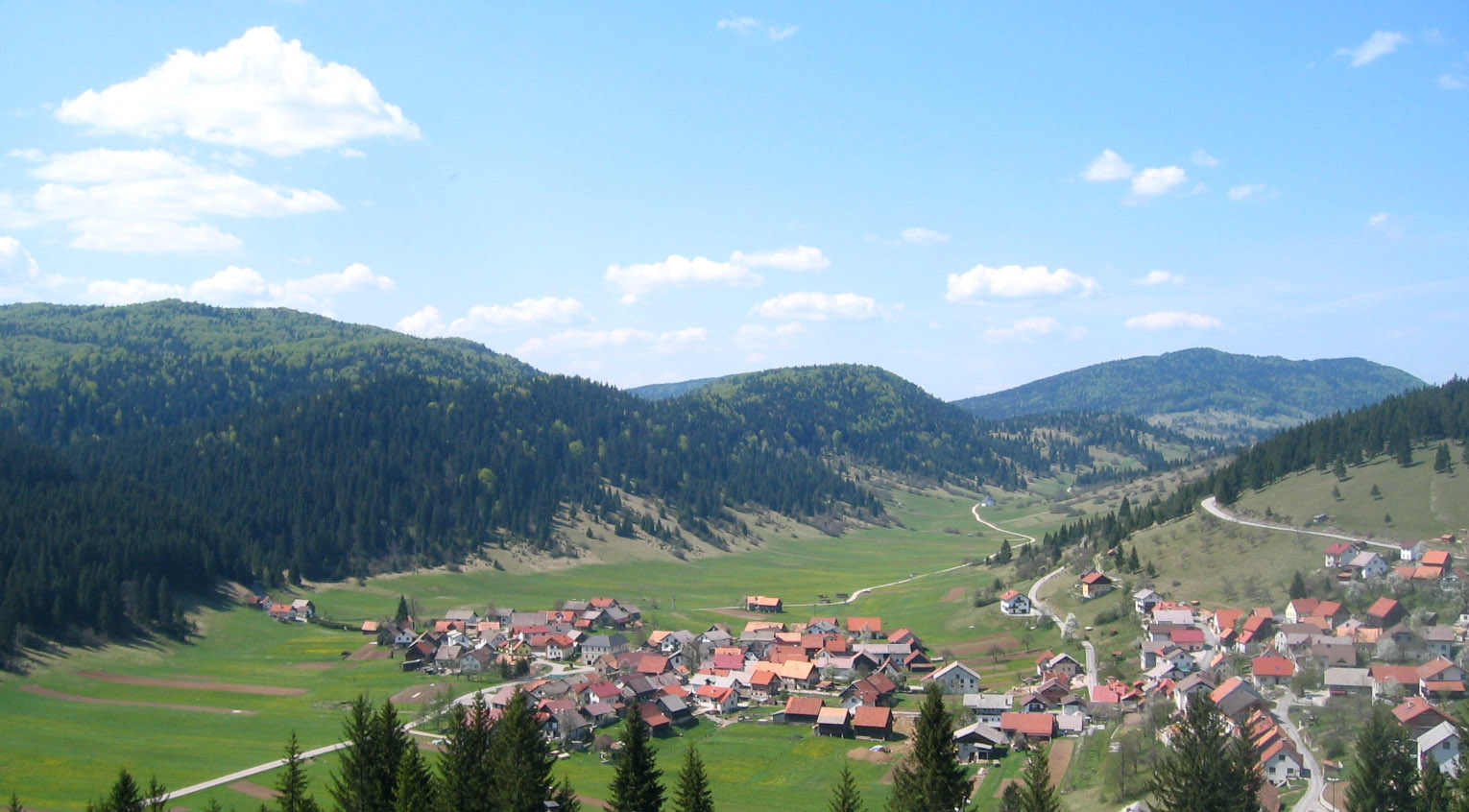
- The village of Retje

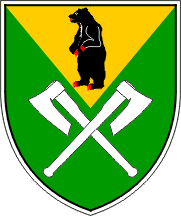
- Coat of arms

- Location of the Municipality of Loški Potok in Slovenia
- Coordinates: 45°42′N 14°35′E
- Country: Slovenia

Government
  - Mayor: Simon Debeljak (Independent)

Area
  - Total: 134 km^{2} (52 sq mi)

Population (2022)
  - Total: 1,796
  - Density: 13.4/km^{2} (34.7/sq mi)
- Time zone: UTC+01 (CET)
  - Summer (DST): UTC+02 (CEST)
- Website: www.loski-potok.si

The Municipality of Loški Potok (pronounced [ˈloːʃki ˈpɔːtɔk]; Slovene: Občina Loški Potok) is a municipality in southern Slovenia. It is part of the traditional region of Lower Carniola and is now included in the Southeast Slovenia Statistical Region. The municipal administration is based in the settlement of Hrib–Loški Potok. Traditionally forestry provided the main income for local inhabitants and it still plays an important role. It borders Croatia.

== Name ==
The name Loški Potok was originally a hydronym, derived from the adjective form of log '(swampy) meadow' + potok 'stream', thus literally meaning 'stream in a (swampy) meadow'. This probably refers to the level area south of Travnik, where there is a creek with the same name. The name was attested in written sources as Laserbach, Loserbach, and Lasserbach in 1763–1787. In the past, the German equivalent of the name was Laserbach. The surrounding Potok Plateau (Slovene: Potočanska planota) is also named after Loški potok.

== Settlements ==
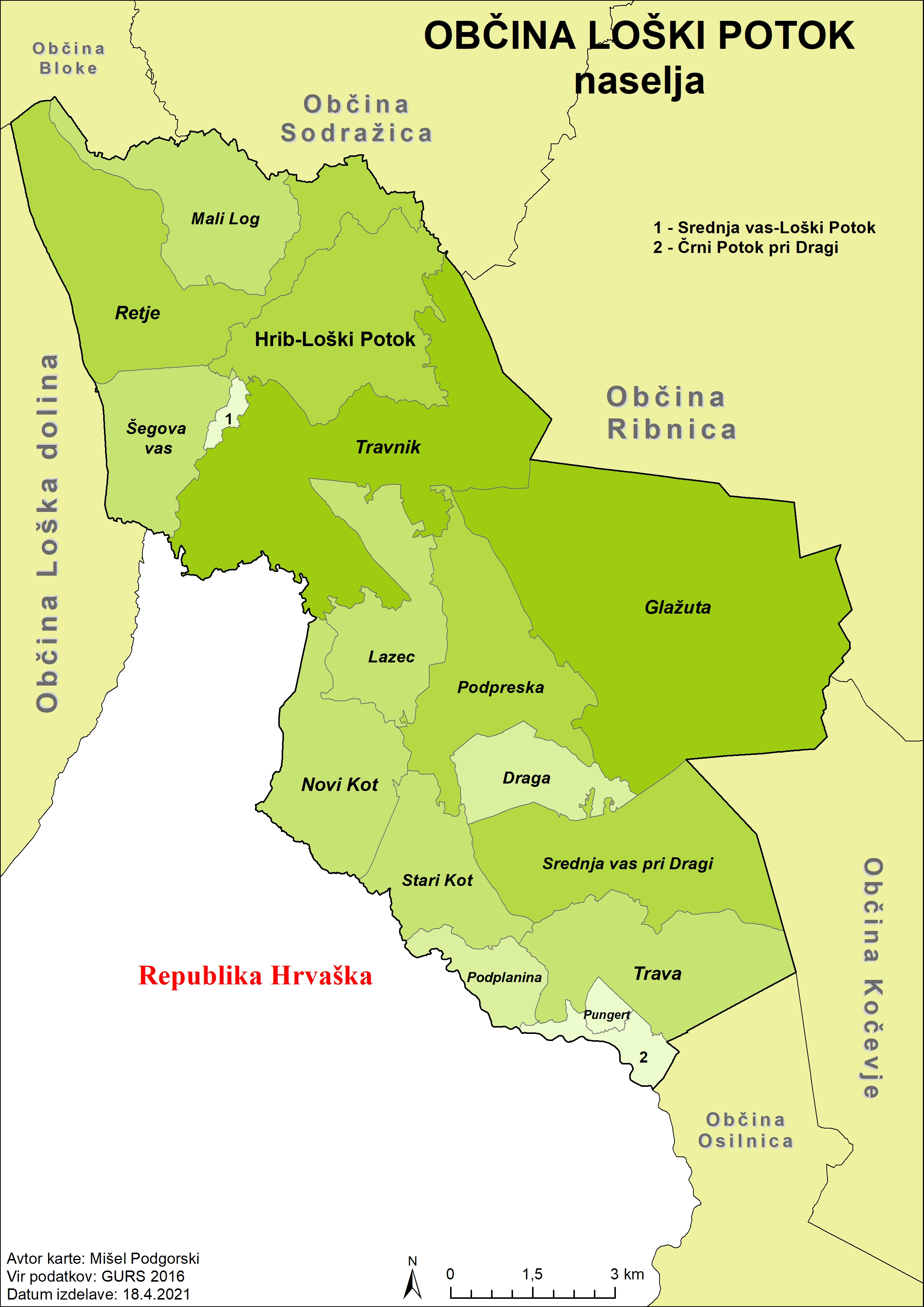
Villages in the municipality

In addition to the municipal seat of Hrib–Loški Potok, the municipality also includes the following settlements:

- Črni Potok pri Dragi
- Draga
- Glažuta
- Lazec
- Mali Log
- Novi Kot
- Podplanina
- Podpreska
- Pungert
- Retje
- Šegova Vas
- Srednja Vas pri Dragi
- Srednja Vas–Loški Potok
- Stari Kot
- Trava
- Travnik
