= Srednja Vas pri Dragi =

Srednja Vas pri Dragi Srednja Vas (until 1953)
- Location in Slovenia
- Coordinates: 45°36′56.33″N 14°39′45.46″E
- Country: Slovenia
- Traditional region: Lower Carniola
- Statistical region: Southeast Slovenia
- Municipality: Loški Potok

Area
  - Total: 10.48 km^{2} (4.05 sq mi)
- Elevation: 786.5 m (2,580 ft)

Population (2002)
  - Total: 48
- Postal code: 1319

Srednja Vas pri Dragi (pronounced [ˈsɾeːdnja ˈʋaːs pɾi ˈdɾaːɡi]; Slovene: Srednja vas pri Dragi, German: Mittergrass or Mittergraß) is a village southeast of Draga in the Municipality of Loški Potok in southern Slovenia. The area is part of the traditional region of Lower Carniola and is now included in the Southeast Slovenia Statistical Region. The settlement includes the hamlet of Šafarje (German: Schaffern).

== Name ==
The name of the settlement was changed from Srednja vas to Srednja vas pri Dragi in 1953.
