= Šegova Vas =

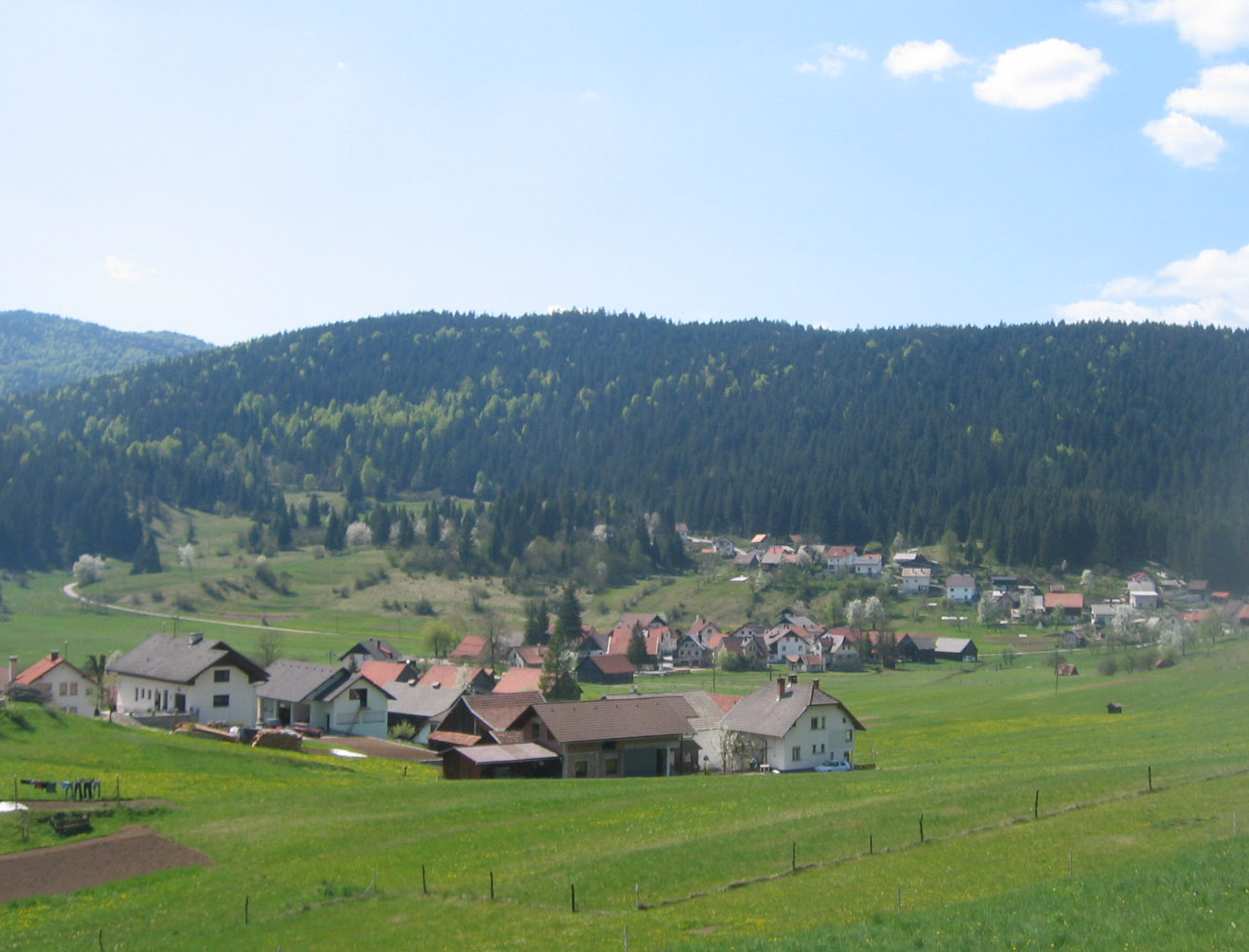

- Location in Slovenia
- Coordinates: 45°41′48.28″N 14°35′12.83″E
- Country: Slovenia
- Traditional region: Lower Carniola
- Statistical region: Southeast Slovenia
- Municipality: Loški Potok

Area
  - Total: 5.15 km^{2} (1.99 sq mi)
- Elevation: 719.8 m (2,362 ft)

Population (2019)
  - Total: 105
- Postal code: 1318

Šegova Vas (pronounced [ʃɛˈɡɔːʋa ˈʋaːs] or [ʃɛˈɡoːʋa ˈʋaːs]; Slovene: Šegova vas, German: Sigisdorf) is a village in the Municipality of Loški Potok in southern Slovenia. The entire municipality is part of the traditional region of Lower Carniola and is now included in the Southeast Slovenia Statistical Region.
