= Srednja Vas–Loški Potok =

Srednja Vas–Loški Potok Srednja vas - Loški Potok Srednja Vas (until 1953)
- Location in Slovenia
- Coordinates: 45°41′42.19″N 14°35′31.36″E
- Country: Slovenia
- Traditional region: Lower Carniola
- Statistical region: Southeast Slovenia
- Municipality: Loški Potok

Area
  - Total: 0.44 km^{2} (0.17 sq mi)
- Elevation: 707.9 m (2,323 ft)

Population (2002)
  - Total: 65
- Postal code: 1318

Srednja Vas–Loški Potok (pronounced [ˈsɾeːdnja ˈʋaːs ˈloːʃki ˈpɔːtɔk]; Slovene: Srednja vas - Loški Potok, German: Mitterdorf) is a settlement in the Municipality of Loški Potok in southern Slovenia. The area is part of the traditional region of Lower Carniola and is now included in the Southeast Slovenia Statistical Region.

== Name ==
The name of the settlement was changed from Srednja vas to Srednja vas - Loški potok in 1953. In the past the German name was Mitterdorf.
