= Blato, Trebnje =

Blato
- Location in Slovenia
- Coordinates: 45°55′58.99″N 15°0′3.69″E
- Country: Slovenia
- Traditional region: Lower Carniola
- Statistical region: Southeast Slovenia
- Municipality: Trebnje

Area
  - Total: 1.51 km^{2} (0.58 sq mi)
- Elevation: 313.2 m (1,028 ft)

Population (2021)
  - Total: 88

Blato (pronounced [ˈblaːtɔ]) is a small settlement north of Trebnje in eastern Slovenia. The area is part of the traditional region of Lower Carniola. The Municipality of Trebnje is now included in the Southeast Slovenia Statistical Region.

== Name ==
Blato was attested in written sources as Mos in 1342 and Moss in 1436.
