= Srednja Vas–Poljane =

Srednja Vas–Poljane Srednja Vas (until 1953)
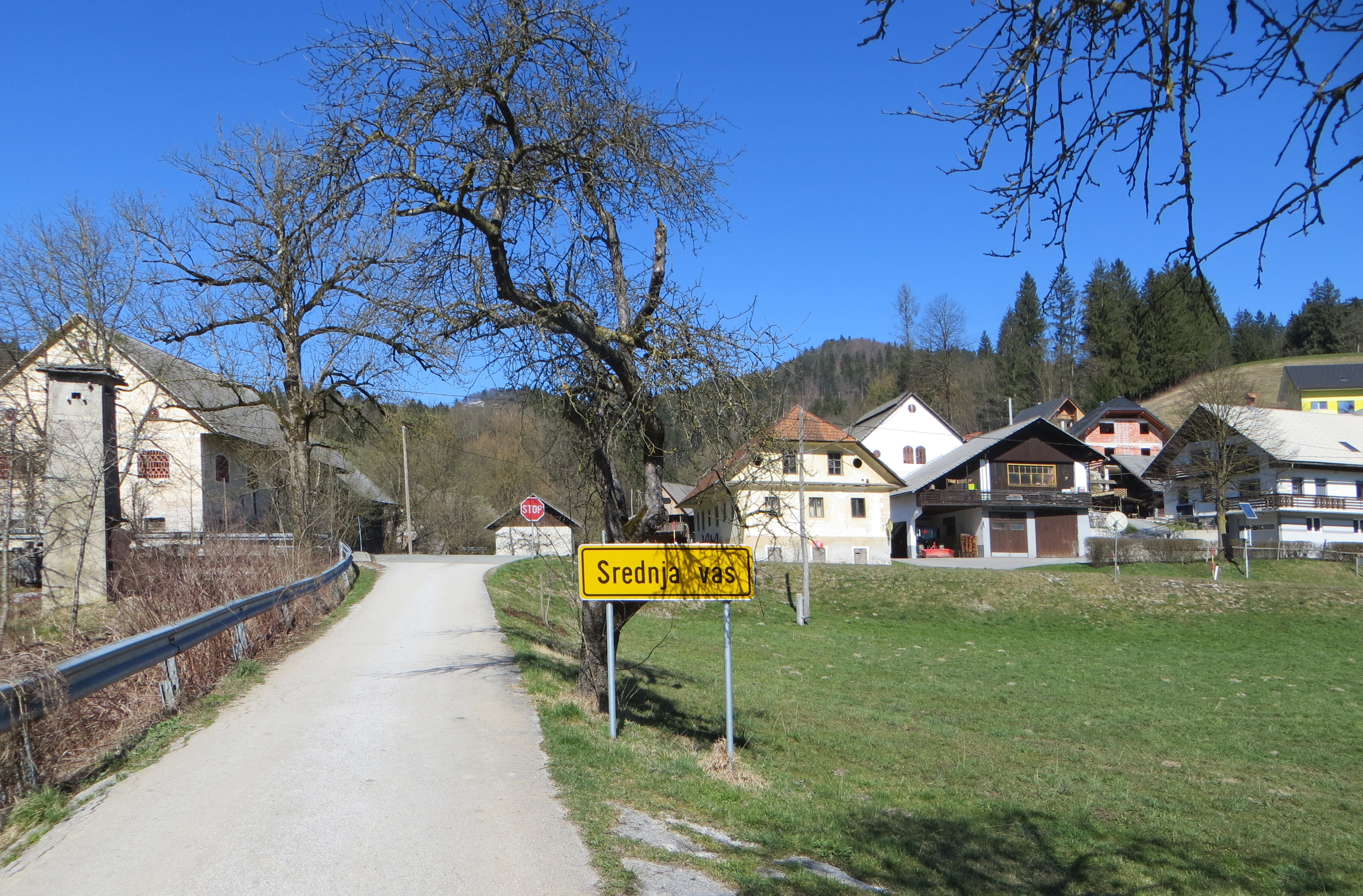

- Location in Slovenia
- Coordinates: 46°6′51.36″N 14°9′43.35″E
- Country: Slovenia
- Traditional region: Upper Carniola
- Statistical region: Upper Carniola
- Municipality: Gorenja Vas–Poljane

Area
  - Total: 1.08 km^{2} (0.42 sq mi)
- Elevation: 396.4 m (1,301 ft)

Population (2020)
  - Total: 129
  - Density: 119/km^{2} (309/sq mi)

Srednja Vas–Poljane (pronounced [ˈsɾeːdnja ˈʋaːs pɔˈljaːnɛ]; Slovene: Srednja vas - Poljane) is a village on the right bank of the Poljane Sora River, halfway between Poljane and Gorenja Vas in the Municipality of Gorenja Vas–Poljane in the Upper Carniola region of Slovenia.

== Name ==
The name of the settlement was changed from Srednja vas to Srednja vas-Poljane in 1953.

== Church ==
The local church, built on a hill above the main settlement, is dedicated to the Holy Cross. It was built in the 1730s in the Baroque style. It used to be particularly well known for its processions during lent. The main altar dates to 1777.
