= Johann Peter Haseney =

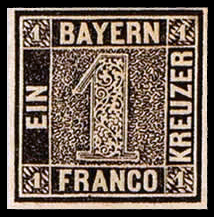
Schwarzer Einser, the first German stamp issued by Bavaria in 1849

Johann Peter Haseney (1812, Mehlis, Saxe-Gotha-Altenburg – 1869, Munich) was a German engraver.

Haseney came to Munich in his young years, where he worked as an engraver with the Seitz company. There he made different designs for stamps. He engraved the first German stamp, the One Kreuzer black (Schwarzer Einser) in the Kingdom of Bavaria, issued on November 1, 1849.
