= Ribčev Laz =

Place in Upper Carniola, Slovenia

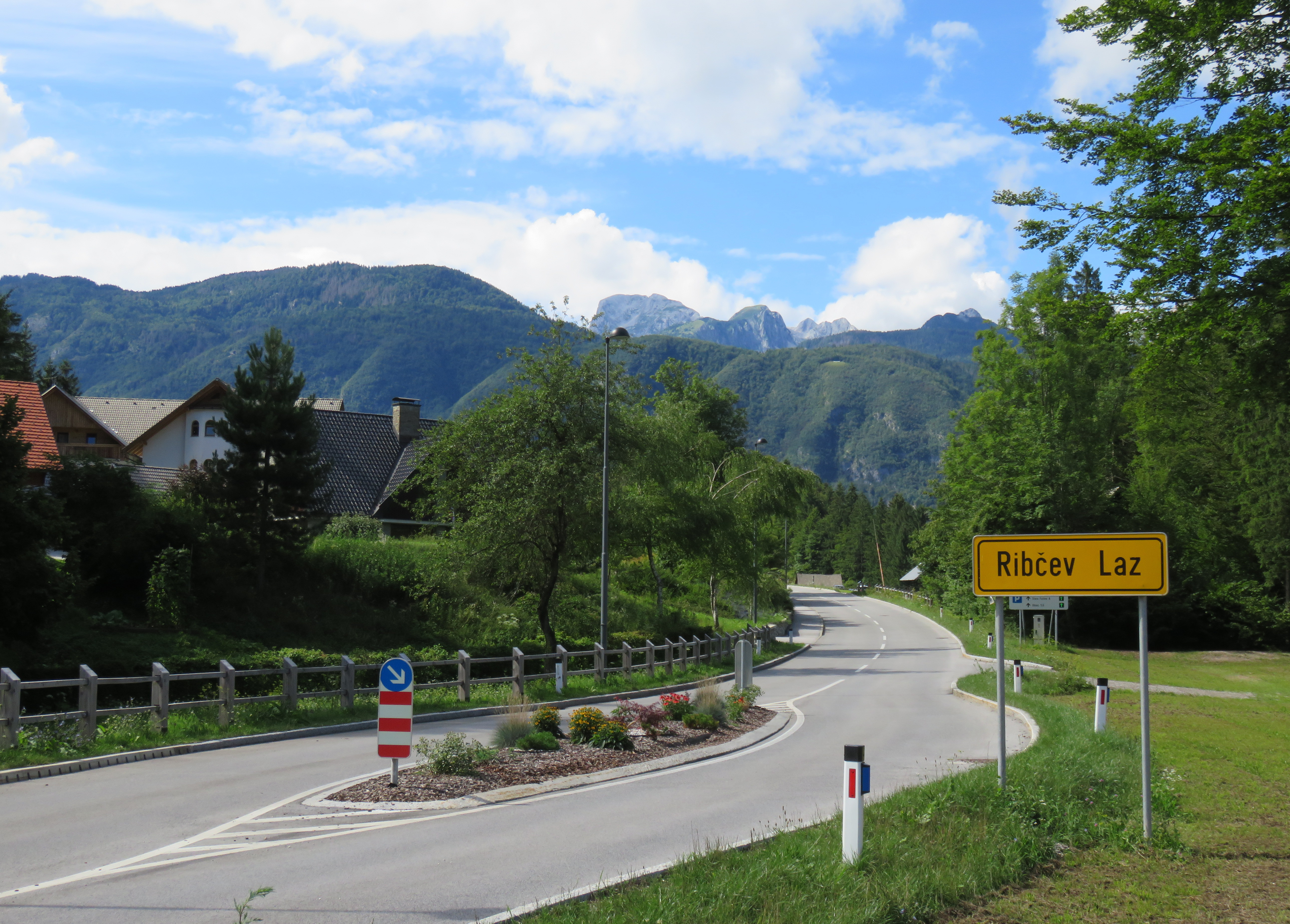

- Location in Slovenia
- Coordinates: 46°16′22.56″N 13°53′29.19″E
- Country: Slovenia
- Traditional region: Upper Carniola
- Statistical region: Upper Carniola
- Municipality: Bohinj
- Elevation: 546.1 m (1,792 ft)

Population (2020)
  - Total: 165

Ribčev Laz (pronounced [ˈɾiːptʃɛu̯ ˈlas], German: Fischgereuth) is a settlement on Lake Bohinj in the Municipality of Bohinj in the Upper Carniola region of Slovenia. Most of the settlement consists of hotels and holiday homes.

== Churches ==
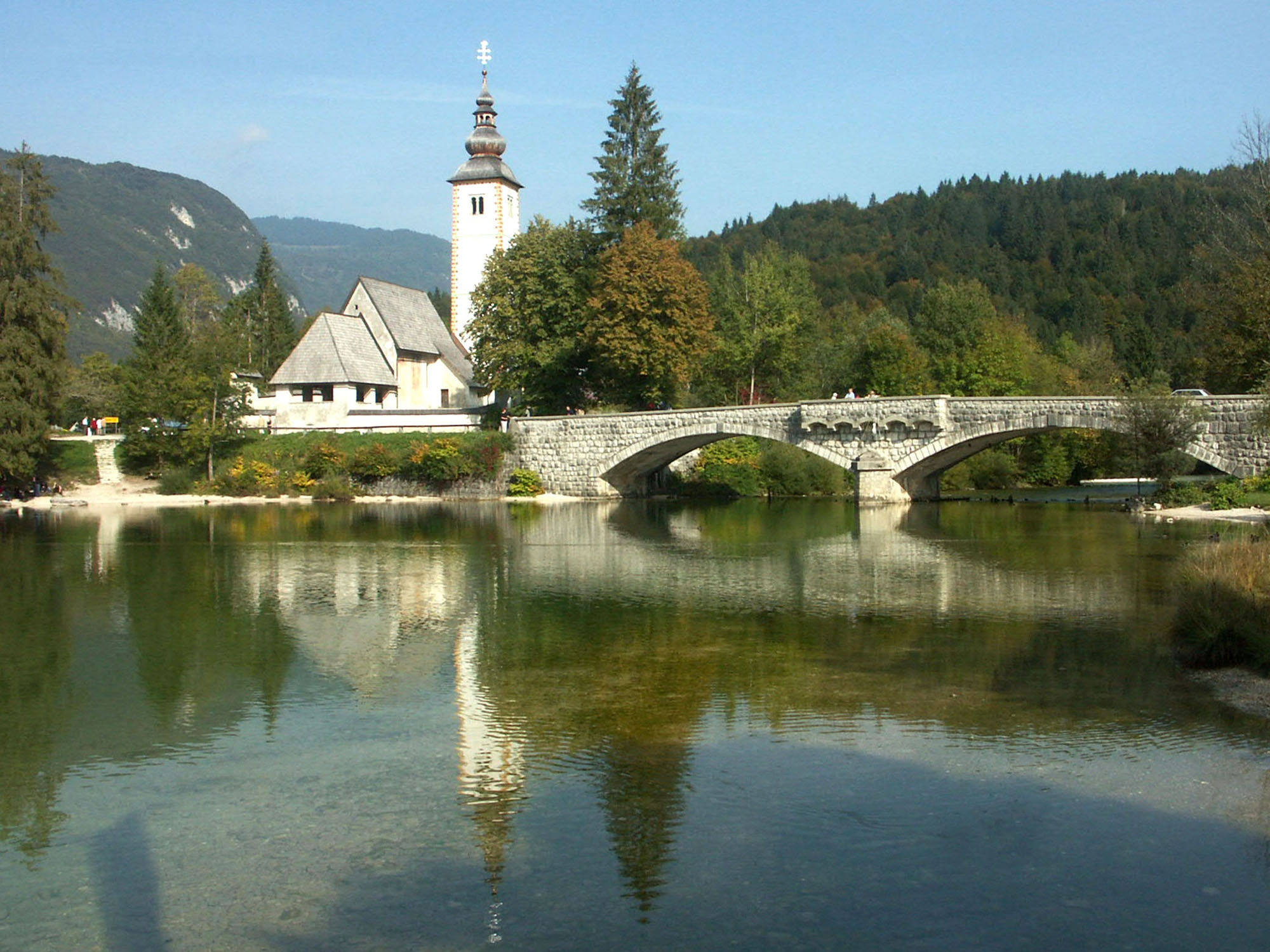
Saint John the Baptist Church

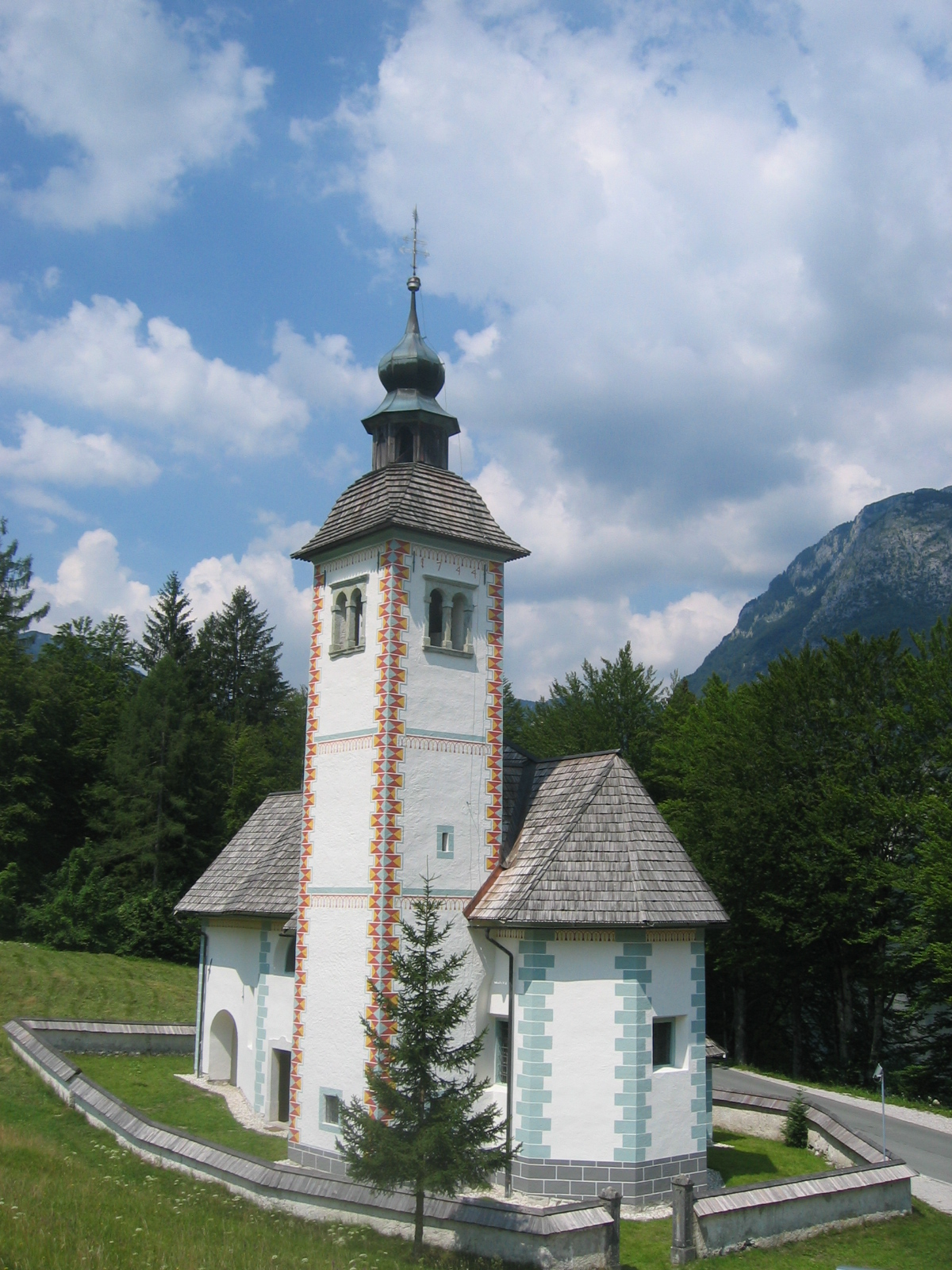
Holy Spirit Church

The local church dedicated to John the Baptist stands just outside the settlement on the shore of Lake Bohinj in the former settlement of Sveti Janez. It is built in a west-east orientation and is surrounded by an old cemetery wall with two entrances. Its origins are Romanesque but it was rebuilt in Gothic style in the 15th century and vaulted in the early 16th century, when some of the frescos were painted by Jernej of Loka.

A second church, dedicated to the Holy Spirit, stands by the road on the way to the far side of the lake in the former settlement of Sveti Duh. It was built in the mid-18th century.
