= Črnec, Ribnica =

Črnec
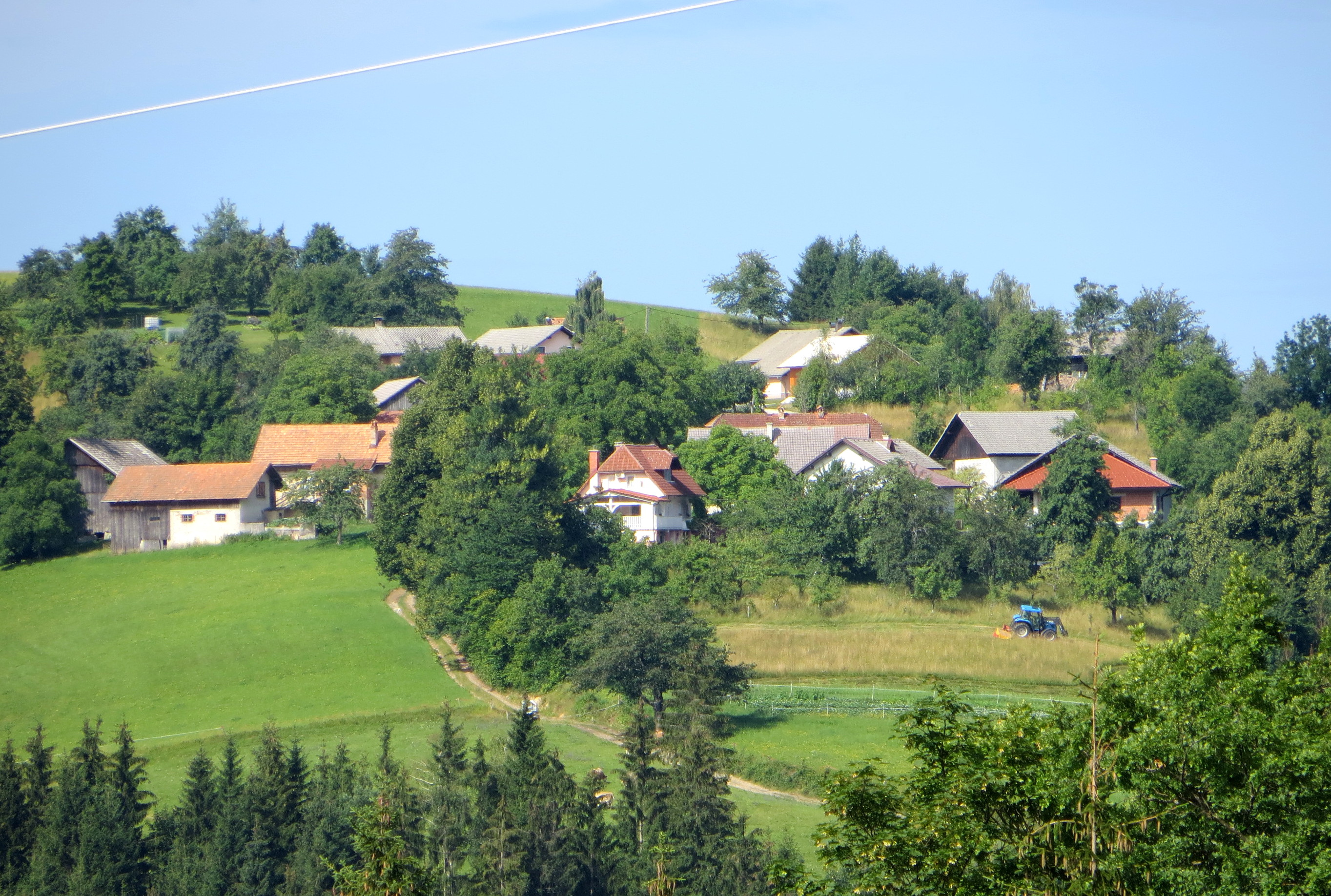

- Location in Slovenia
- Coordinates: 45°47′7.17″N 14°37′27.07″E
- Country: Slovenia
- Traditional region: Lower Carniola
- Statistical region: Southeast Slovenia
- Municipality: Ribnica

Area
  - Total: 0.96 km^{2} (0.37 sq mi)
- Elevation: 720 m (2,360 ft)

Population (2002)
  - Total: 25
- Postal code: 1316

Črnec (pronounced [ˈtʃəɾnəts]; in older sources also Črnče, German: Tscherntsche) is a small settlement west of Sveti Gregor in the Municipality of Ribnica in southern Slovenia. The area is part of the traditional region of Lower Carniola and is now included in the Southeast Slovenia Statistical Region.
