= Travnik, Loški Potok =

Travnik
- Location in Slovenia
- Coordinates: 45°41′27.36″N 14°35′49.96″E
- Country: Slovenia
- Traditional region: Lower Carniola
- Statistical region: Southeast Slovenia
- Municipality: Loški Potok

Area
  - Total: 18.32 km^{2} (7.07 sq mi)
- Elevation: 703.8 m (2,309 ft)

Population (2019)
  - Total: 266
- Postal code: 1318

Travnik (pronounced [ˈtɾaːu̯nik], German: Traunik) is a settlement in the Municipality of Loški Potok in southern Slovenia. It includes the hamlet of Bela Voda and a few dispersed farmsteads in the hills east of the main settlement. The area is part of the traditional region of Lower Carniola and is now included in the Southeast Slovenia Statistical Region. The settlement includes the hamlets of Bela Voda (German: Weißwasser), Dednik, and Kaplja (German: Kappel).

There is a small chapel in the settlement. It is dedicated to the Our Lady of the Rosary and dates to the late 19th to early 20th century.

The unincorporated community of Traunik, Michigan is named after Travnik.
