= Črni Potok pri Dragi =

Črni Potok pri Dragi Črni Potok (until 1953)
- Location in Slovenia
- Coordinates: 45°35′17.08″N 14°40′57.1″E
- Country: Slovenia
- Traditional region: Lower Carniola
- Statistical region: Southeast Slovenia
- Municipality: Loški Potok

Area
  - Total: 1.42 km^{2} (0.55 sq mi)
- Elevation: 474.6 m (1,557 ft)

Population (2002)
  - Total: 28
- Postal code: 1319

Črni Potok pri Dragi (pronounced [ˈtʃəɾni ˈpɔːtɔk pɾi ˈdɾaːɡi]; German: Schwarzenbach) is a small settlement on the left bank of the Čabranka River in the Municipality of Loški Potok in southern Slovenia, right on the border with Croatia. The area is part of the traditional region of Lower Carniola and is now included in the Southeast Slovenia Statistical Region.

== Name ==
The name of the settlement was changed from Črni Potok to Črni Potok pri Dragi in 1953. In the past the German name was Schwarzenbach.
