= Gabrje pri Stični =

Gabrje pri Stični Gabrje (until 1953)
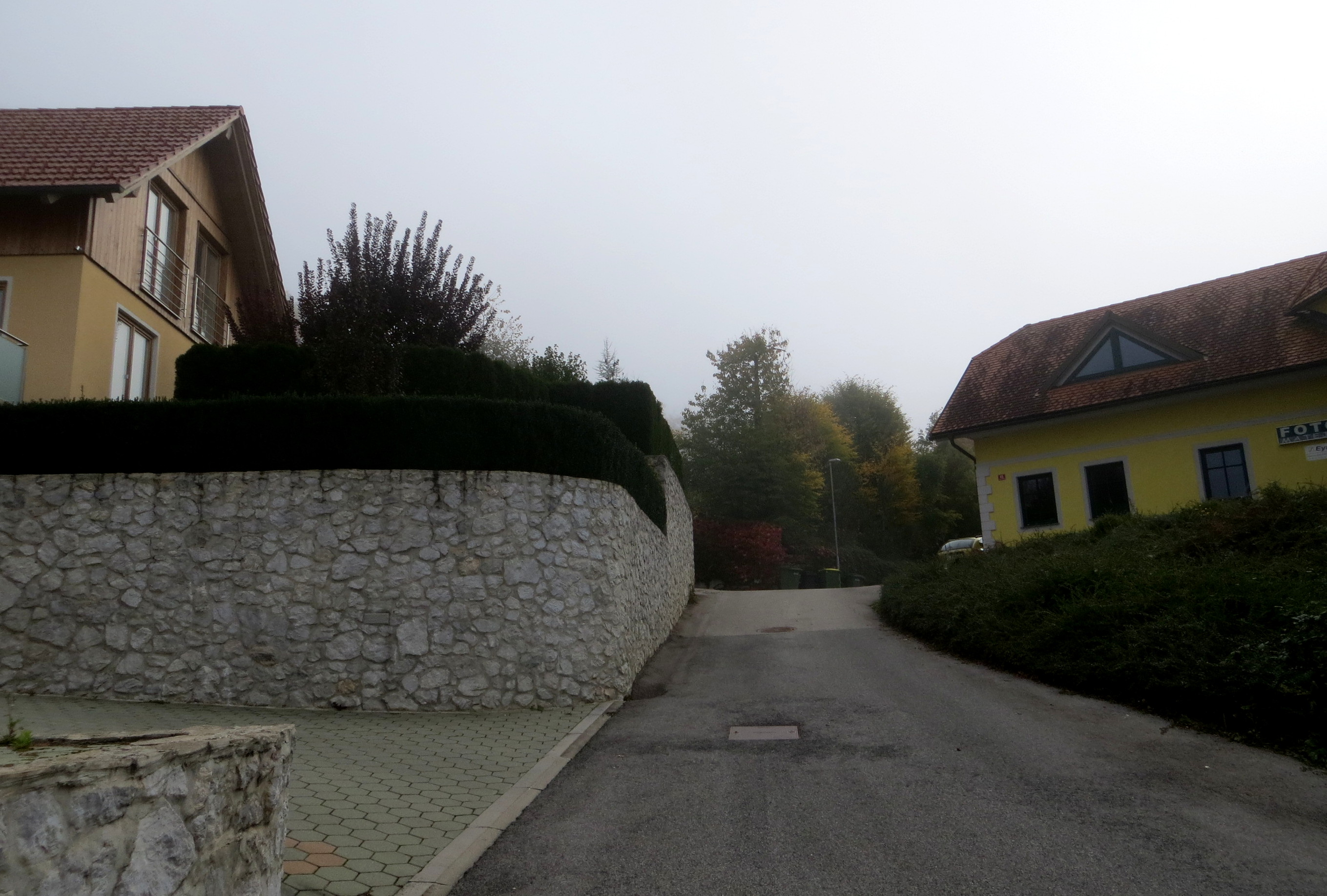

- Location in Slovenia
- Coordinates: 45°57′36.57″N 14°48′27.01″E
- Country: Slovenia
- Traditional region: Lower Carniola
- Statistical region: Central Slovenia
- Municipality: Ivančna Gorica

Area
  - Total: 0.72 km^{2} (0.28 sq mi)
- Elevation: 368.6 m (1,209 ft)

Population (2002)
  - Total: 119

Gabrje pri Stični (pronounced [ˈɡaːbəɾjɛ pɾi ˈstiːtʃni]; in older sources also Gabrije) is a settlement just north of Stična in the Municipality of Ivančna Gorica in central Slovenia. The area is part of the historical region of Lower Carniola. The municipality is now included in the Central Slovenia Statistical Region. The settlement includes the hamlets of Kurja Vas (Slovene: Kurja vas, German: Hühnerdorf), Potok, Pungrt (in older sources also Pungert), and Nograd (in older sources also Vinograd).

== Name ==
The name of the settlement was changed from Gabrje to Gabrje pri Stični in 1953.

== Cultural heritage ==
A small roadside chapel in the settlement is dedicated to the Virgin Mary and was built in the early 20th century.
