= One kreuzer black =

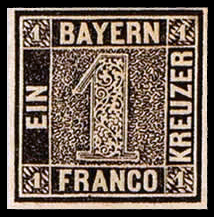
- Country of production: Bavaria
- Location of production: Munich
- Date of production: 1 November 1849
- No. in existence: Unknown
- Face value: One kreuzer
- Estimated value: Unused US $600; Used US $1,600

The One kreuzer black, or Schwarzer Einser, was the first postage stamp issued in the Kingdom of Bavaria, and the first anywhere in the territories making up modern Germany. It was issued on 1 November 1849. 832,500 copies were printed on handmade paper in the printing shop of LMU Munich.

In October 1851 the stamps were removed from sale, but remained valid for postage until 31 August 1864.

The stamp was designed by Johann Peter Haseney, engraved by F.J. Seitz, and printed by J.G. Weiss; their initials 'PH', 'S', and 'W' are hidden according to Joseph de Heselle in the floral pattern of the numeral as a safety precaution against forgery. The stamp is black and in the center is a large numeric denomination. Later engraving was moved from wood to plaster, which has led to distortions in the size of the print. Different varieties of the stamp also emerged due to the damage to the engraving press and engraving itself, such as color dots and damaged angles.

Subsequent stamps of Bavaria followed the same general layout, though with the numeral framed in a complete or partial circle.

This stamp is valuable but not especially rare. The 2002 Scott catalogue values an unused copy at US$600 and a used copy at $1,600.
