= Pungert, Loški Potok =

Pungert
- Location in Slovenia
- Coordinates: 45°35′37.78″N 14°40′43.14″E
- Country: Slovenia
- Traditional region: Lower Carniola
- Statistical region: Southeast Slovenia
- Municipality: Loški Potok

Area
  - Total: 0.58 km^{2} (0.22 sq mi)
- Elevation: 598.3 m (1,963 ft)

Population (2024)
  - Total: 3
- Postal code: 1319

Pungert (pronounced [ˈpuːŋɡɛɾt]; German: Baumgarten) is a small settlement in the Municipality of Loški Potok in southern Slovenia. The area is part of the traditional region of Lower Carniola and is now included in the Southeast Slovenia Statistical Region.
