= Mali Log =

- Location in Slovenia
- Coordinates: 45°43′19.94″N 14°35′10.3″E
- Country: Slovenia
- Traditional region: Lower Carniola
- Statistical region: Southeast Slovenia
- Municipality: Loški Potok

Area
  - Total: 6.78 km^{2} (2.62 sq mi)
- Elevation: 810.4 m (2,659 ft)

Population (2019)
  - Total: 223
- Postal code: 1318

Mali Log (pronounced [ˈmaːli ˈloːk]; German: Kleinlack) is a village in the Municipality of Loški Potok in southern Slovenia. The area is part of the traditional region of Lower Carniola and is now included in the Southeast Slovenia Statistical Region.
