= Polje, Bohinj =

Polje
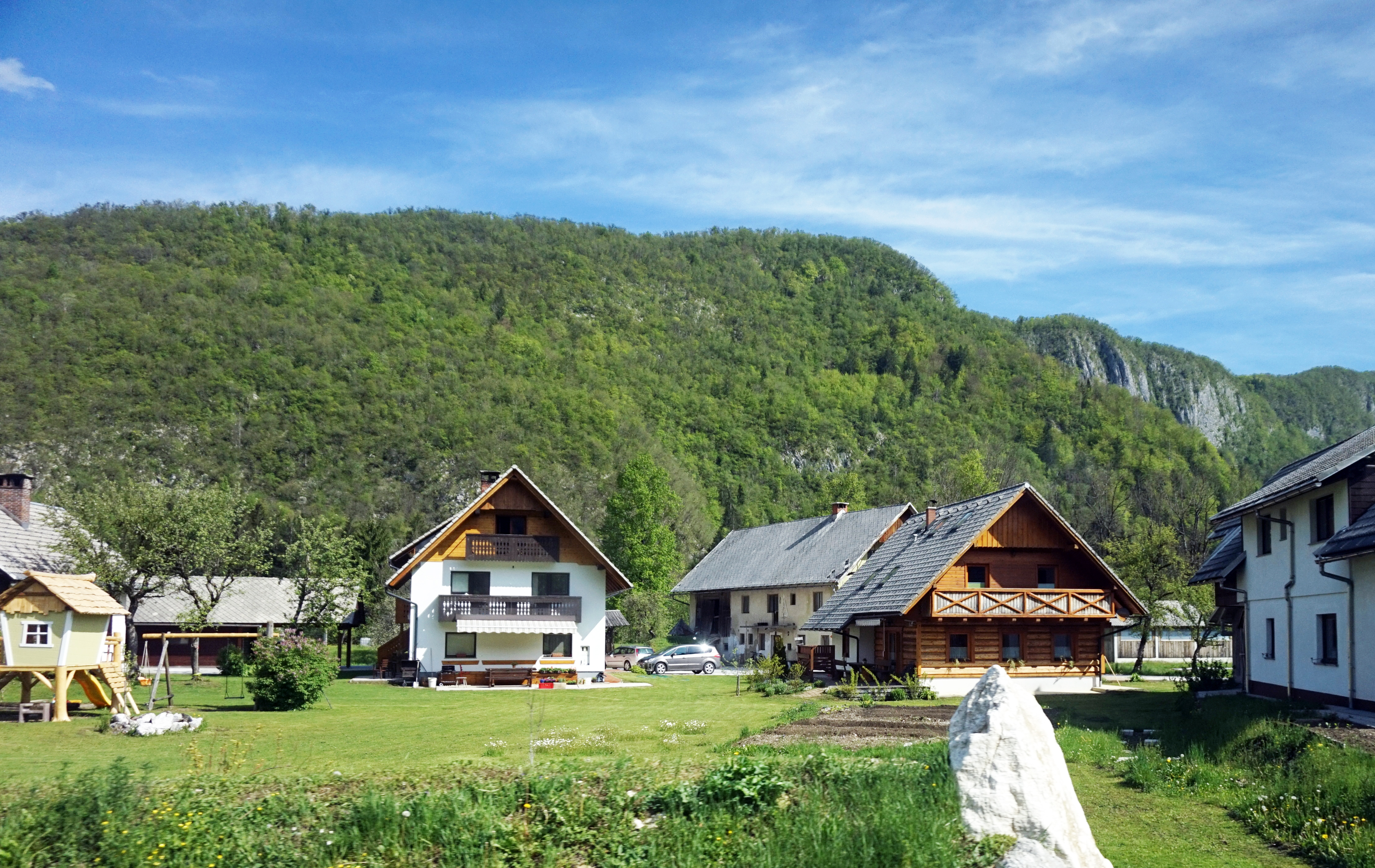

- Location in Slovenia
- Coordinates: 46°16′5.7″N 13°54′34.92″E
- Country: Slovenia
- Traditional region: Upper Carniola
- Statistical region: Upper Carniola
- Municipality: Bohinj
- Elevation: 520.9 m (1,709 ft)

Population (2020)
  - Total: 182

Polje (pronounced [ˈpɔːljɛ], German: Feld) is a settlement in the Municipality of Bohinj in the Upper Carniola region of Slovenia.
