= Črnec =

Črnec may refer to:

- Črnec, Ribnica, a village in southern Slovenia
- Črnec (Ledava), a river in northeastern Slovenia
- Črnec (Glogovnica), a river in central Croatia
- Črnec (Lonja), a river in central Croatia
