= Hrib–Loški Potok =

Village in Lower Carniola, Slovenia

Hrib–Loški Potok Hrib - Loški potok Hrib (until 1953)
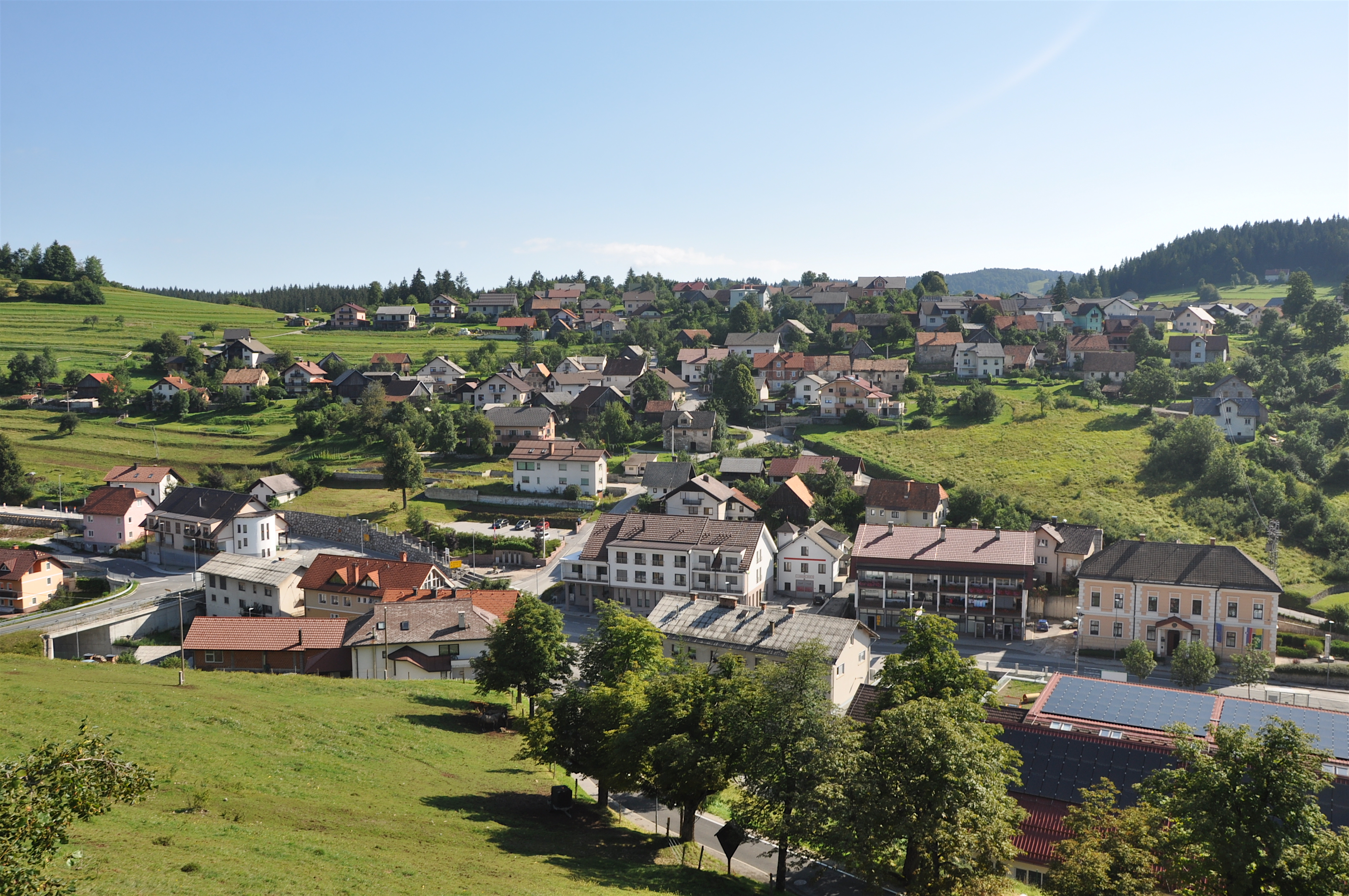

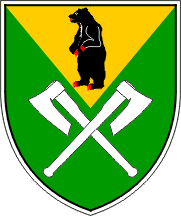
- Coat of arms

- Location in Slovenia
- Coordinates: 45°42′5.49″N 14°35′24.26″E
- Country: Slovenia
- Traditional region: Lower Carniola
- Statistical region: Southeast Slovenia
- Municipality: Loški Potok

Area
  - Total: 9.56 km^{2} (3.69 sq mi)
- Elevation: 771.5 m (2,531 ft)

Population (2002)
  - Total: 353
- Postal code: 1318

Hrib–Loški Potok (pronounced [ˈxɾiːb ˈloːʃki ˈpɔːtɔk]; Slovene: Hrib - Loški Potok) is a village in the Municipality of Loški Potok in southern Slovenia. It is also the administrative centre of the municipality. The area is part of the traditional region of Lower Carniola and is now included in the Southeast Slovenia Statistical Region.

== Name ==
The name of the settlement was changed from Hrib to Hrib - Loški potok in 1953.

== Church ==
The parish church in the settlement is dedicated to Saint Leonard and belongs to the Roman Catholic Archdiocese of Ljubljana. It was built in 1670 on the site of a 14th-century building. It has an octagonal floor plan and a large belfry. A second church in the settlement is dedicated to Saint Barbara and dates to the 17th century.
