= Novi Kot =

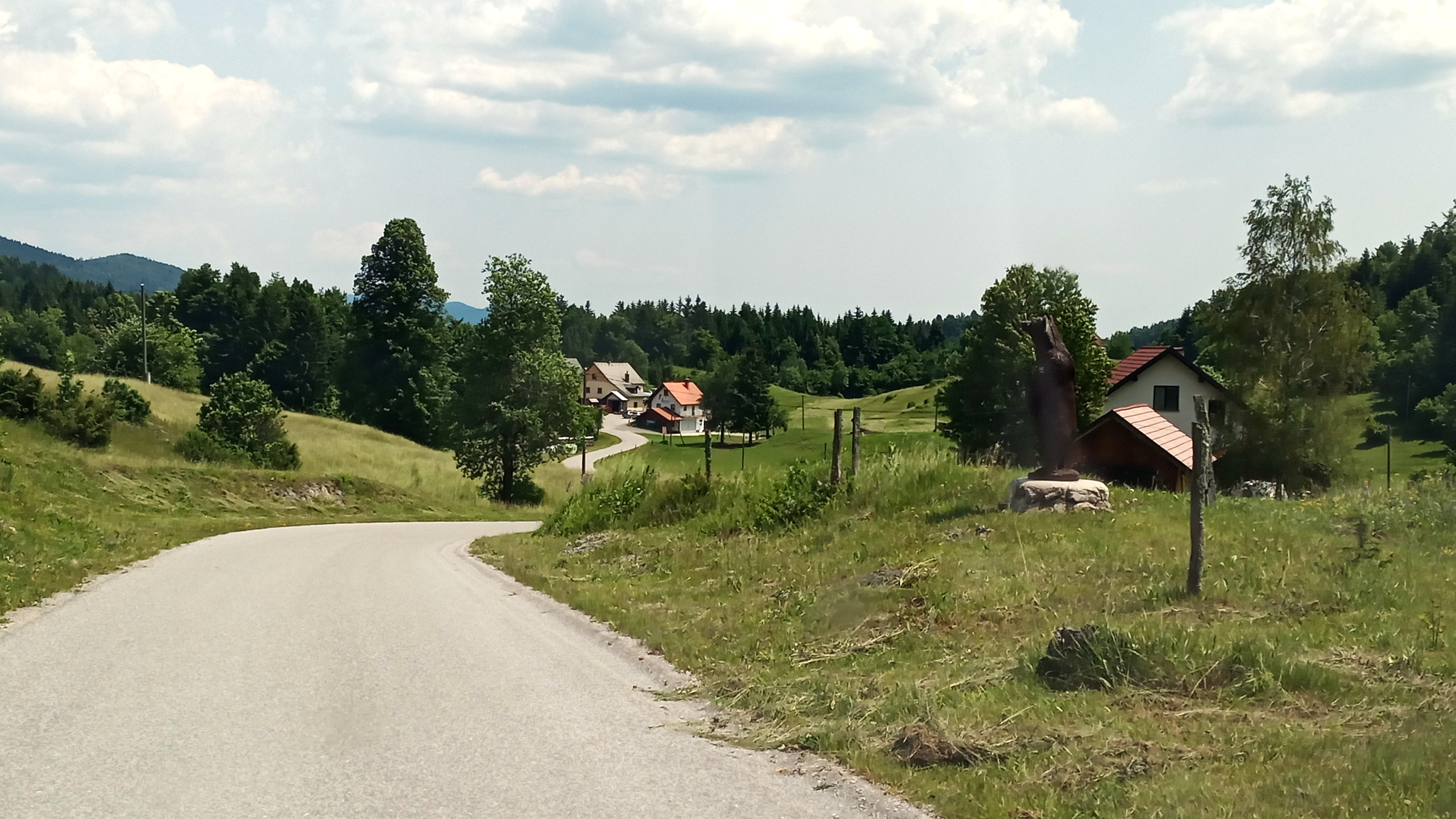

- Location in Slovenia
- Coordinates: 45°37′17.17″N 14°36′53.6″E
- Country: Slovenia
- Traditional region: Lower Carniola
- Statistical region: Southeast Slovenia
- Municipality: Loški Potok

Area
  - Total: 6.96 km^{2} (2.69 sq mi)
- Elevation: 800.3 m (2,626 ft)

Population (2022)
  - Total: 64
- Postal code: 1319

Novi Kot (pronounced [ˈnɔːʋi ˈkoːt]; German: Neuwinkel) is a dispersed settlement in the Municipality of Loški Potok in southern Slovenia, right on the border with Croatia. The area is part of the traditional region of Lower Carniola and is now included in the Southeast Slovenia Statistical Region.

== Name ==
The Slovene name Novi Kot is semantically equivalent to the German name Neuwinkel, both literally meaning 'new combe'. The element kot in Slovene place names generally refers to the end of a valley or the place where a valley meets the mountains. The Slovenian adjective and demonym for Novi Kot, in addition to the expected novokotarski and Novokotar, are paralleled by the local terms novobinklerski and Novobinkler, derived from the German toponym.

== History ==
Novi Kot was founded in the 18th century, when settlers arrived in the area from Loški Potok. In the past, the residents also did seasonal forestry work in Croatia and Hungary. A school was established in the settlement in 1903. Italian troops burned the settlement on 29 July 1942 and imprisoned many of the inhabitants at the Rab concentration camp, where 46 of them died. When the survivors returned, some of them settled in nearby villages and others renovated their homes. A monument commemorating the victims of the Rab concentration camp was unveiled in the settlement in 1966.

== Notable people ==
Notable people that were born or lived in Novi Kot include:

- Jakob Turk (1872–1935), chemical engineer and fertilizer and pasturage expert
- Zdravko Turk (1904–1991), technical writer and forestry engineer
