= Draga, Loški Potok =

Draga
- Location in Slovenia
- Coordinates: 45°37′58.12″N 14°39′16″E
- Country: Slovenia
- Traditional region: Lower Carniola
- Statistical region: Southeast Slovenia
- Municipality: Loški Potok

Area
  - Total: 3.45 km^{2} (1.33 sq mi)
- Elevation: 760.1 m (2,494 ft)

Population (2019)
  - Total: 132
- Postal code: 1319

Draga (pronounced [ˈdɾaːɡa]; German: Suchen) is a village in the Municipality of Loški Potok in southern Slovenia. The area is part of the traditional region of Lower Carniola and is now included in the Southeast Slovenia Statistical Region.

== Name ==
The name Draga is derived from the Slovene common noun draga 'small, narrow valley', referring to the geographical location of the settlement. In the past the German name was Suchen.

== Church ==
The parish church in the settlement is dedicated to the Visitation of Mary and belongs to the Roman Catholic Archdiocese of Ljubljana. It was built in 1810 on the site of an earlier church, of which only the belfry remains.
