= Spodnja Bukova Gora =

Remote abandoned settlement in Kočevje, Slovenia

- Location in Slovenia
- Coordinates: 45°33′48.69″N 15°3′51.16″E
- Country: Slovenia
- Traditional region: Lower Carniola
- Statistical region: Southeast Slovenia
- Municipality: Kočevje
- Elevation: 603 m (1,978 ft)

Population (2002)
  - Total: 0

Spodnja Bukova Gora (pronounced [ˈspoːdnja ˈbuːkɔʋa ˈɡɔːɾa]; in older sources also Dolenja Bukova Gora, German: Unterbuchberg) is a remote abandoned settlement in the Municipality of Kočevje in southern Slovenia. The area is part of the traditional region of Lower Carniola and is now included in the Southeast Slovenia Statistical Region. Its territory is now part of the village of Bukova Gora.

== History ==
Spodnja Bukova Gora was a Gottschee German village. All of the houses in the settlement were burned by Italian troops in August 1942 during the Rog Offensive. Together with Gorenja Bukova Gora and Srednja Bukova Gora, it was merged into the settlement of Bukova Gora in 1955.
