= Gorenja Bukova Gora =

- Location in Slovenia
- Coordinates: 45°34′44.26″N 15°3′33.51″E
- Country: Slovenia
- Traditional region: Lower Carniola
- Statistical region: Southeast Slovenia
- Municipality: Kočevje
- Elevation: 710 m (2,330 ft)

Population (2002)
  - Total: none

Gorenja Bukova Gora (pronounced [ɡɔˈɾeːnja ˈbuːkɔʋa ˈɡɔːɾa]; German: Oberbuchberg) is a remote abandoned settlement in the Municipality of Kočevje in southern Slovenia. The area is part of the traditional region of Lower Carniola and is now included in the Southeast Slovenia Statistical Region. Its territory is now part of the village of Bukova Gora.

== History ==
Gorenja Bukova Gora was a Gottschee German village. It was abandoned in the late 19th and early 20th century, when all its inhabitants emigrated, mostly to the United States. A cabin for forestry workers was later built in the vicinity of the village. Together with Srednja Bukova Gora and Spodnja Bukova Gora, it was merged into the settlement of Bukova Gora in 1955.
