= Bukova Gora, Kočevje =

Bukova Gora
- Location in Slovenia
- Coordinates: 45°34′44.26″N 15°3′33.51″E
- Country: Slovenia
- Traditional region: Lower Carniola
- Statistical region: Southeast Slovenia
- Municipality: Kočevje

Area
  - Total: 2.81 km^{2} (1.08 sq mi)
- Elevation: 832.1 m (2,730 ft)

Population (2002)
  - Total: none

Bukova Gora (pronounced [ˈbuːkɔʋa ˈɡɔːɾa]; German: Buchberg) is a remote abandoned settlement in the Municipality of Kočevje in southern Slovenia. The area is part of the traditional region of Lower Carniola and is now included in the Southeast Slovenia Statistical Region.

The settlement is made up of three separate hamlets: Gorenja Bukova Gora (Oberbuchberg), Srednja Bukova Gora (Mitterbuchberg), and Spodnja Bukova Gora (Unterbuchberg), formerly independent settlements. It was inhabited by Gottschee Germans. Gorenja Bukova Gora was abandoned in the late 19th and early 20th century, when all its inhabitants emigrated, mostly to the United States. Srednja and Spodnja Bukova Gora were abandoned after they were burned down in 1942 during the Second World War. The local church, dedicated to Saint Peter, was also burned down.
