= List of cities, towns, and villages in Slovenia: D =

This is a list of cities, towns, and villages in Slovenia, starting with D.

Settlement	Municipality
Daber	Tolmin
Dalce	Krško
Daljni Vrh	Novo Mesto
Dalnje Njive	Črnomelj
Damelj	Črnomelj
Dane pri Divači	Divača
Dane pri Sežani	Sežana
Dane	Loška Dolina
Dane	Ribnica
Dankovci	Puconci
Davča	Železniki
Debeče	Ivančna Gorica
Debenec	Mirna
Debeni	Gorenja vas-Poljane
Debro	Laško
Dečina	Črnomelj
Dečja vas pri Zagradcu	Ivančna Gorica
Dečja vas	Trebnje
Dečno Selo	Brežice
Dedna Gora	Sevnica
Dedni Dol	Ivančna Gorica
Dedni Vrh	Krško
Dednik	Velike Lašče
Dednja vas	Brežice
Dekani	Koper
Dekmanca	Bistrica ob Sotli
Delač	Kostel
Delnice	Gorenja vas-Poljane
Depala vas	Domžale
Desenci	Destrnik
Desinec	Črnomelj
Deskle	Kanal
Deskova vas	Črnomelj
Desnjak	Ljutomer
Destrnik	Destrnik
Dešeča vas	Žužemberk
Dešen	Moravče
Devina	Slovenska Bistrica
Dežno pri Makolah	Slovenska Bistrica
Dežno pri Podlehniku	Podlehnik
Dilce	Postojna
Dilici	Koper
Divača	Divača
Divči	Komen
Dob pri Šentvidu	Ivančna Gorica
Dob	Domžale
Dobe	Krško
Dobec	Cerknica
Dobeno	Brežice
Dobeno	Mengeš
Dobindol	Dolenjske Toplice
Dobja vas	Ravne na Koroškem
Dobje pri Lesičnem	Šentjur
Dobje pri Planini	Dobje
Dobje	Gorenja vas-Poljane
Dobje	Grosuplje
Dobje	Litija
Doblar	Kanal
Doblatina	Laško
Dobletina	Nazarje
Dobležiče	Kozje
Dobliče	Črnomelj
Doblička Gora	Črnomelj
Dobova	Brežice
Dobovec pri Ponikvi	Šentjur
Dobovec pri Rogatcu	Rogatec
Dobovec	Trbovlje
Dobovica	Litija
Dobovlje	Domžale
Dobovo	Novo Mesto
Dobrava ob Krki	Krško
Dobrava pod Rako	Krško
Dobrava pri Konjicah	Slovenske Konjice
Dobrava pri Kostanjevici	Krško
Dobrava pri Stični	Ivančna Gorica
Dobrava pri Škocjanu	Škocjan
Dobrava	Izola
Dobrava	Križevci
Dobrava	Ormož
Dobrava	Radeče
Dobrava	Radlje ob Dravi
Dobrava	Trebnje
Dobravica pri Velikem Gabru	Trebnje
Dobravica	Ig
Dobravica	Radovljica
Dobravica	Šentjernej
Dobravlje	Ajdovščina
Dobravlje	Sežana
Dobravšce	Gorenja vas-Poljane
Dobrič	Polzela
Dobrije	Ravne na Koroškem
Dobrina	Šentjur
Dobrina	Žetale
Dobriša vas	Žalec
Dobriška vas	Oplotnica
Dobrljevo	Zagorje ob Savi
Dobrna	Dobrna
Dobrnež	Slovenske Konjice
Dobrnič	Trebnje
Dobro Polje	Ilirska Bistrica
Dobro Polje	Radovljica
Dobrova pri Dravogradu	Dravograd
Dobrova pri Prihovi	Oplotnica
Dobrova	Celje
Dobrova	Dobrova-Polhov Gradec
Dobrova	Krško
Dobrovce	Miklavž na Dravskem Polju
Dobrovlje pri Mozirju	Mozirje
Dobrovlje	Braslovče
Dobrovlje	Zreče
Dobrovnik	Dobrovnik
Dobrovo	Brda
Dobrovščak	Ormož
Dobrteša vas	Žalec
Dobruša	Vodice
Dobruška vas	Škocjan
Dogoše	Maribor
Doklece	Majšperk
Dokležovje	Beltinci
Dol pod Gojko	Vojnik
Dol pri Borovnici	Borovnica
Dol pri Hrastniku	Hrastnik
Dol pri Hrastovljah	Koper
Dol pri Laškem	Laško
Dol pri Ljubljani	Dol pri Ljubljani
Dol pri Pristavi	Šmarje pri Jelšah
Dol pri Stopercah	Majšperk
Dol pri Šmarjeti	Novo Mesto
Dol pri Šmarju	Šmarje pri Jelšah
Dol pri Trebnjem	Trebnje
Dol pri Vogljah	Sežana
Dol	Gornji Grad
Dol	Kočevje
Dol	Krško
Dol	Medvode
Dolanci	Komen
Dolane	Gorišnica
Dole pod Sv. Trojico	Moravče
Dole pri Krašcah	Moravče
Dole pri Litiji	Litija
Dole pri Polici	Grosuplje
Dole pri Škofljici	Škofljica
Dole	Idrija
Dole	Metlika
Dole	Šentjur
Dolena	Videm
Dolenci	Šalovci
Dolenčice	Gorenja vas-Poljane
Dolenja Brezovica	Brezovica
Dolenja Brezovica	Šentjernej
Dolenja Dobrava	Gorenja vas-Poljane
Dolenja Dobrava	Trebnje
Dolenja Lepa vas	Krško
Dolenja Nemška vas	Trebnje
Dolenja Pirošica	Brežice
Dolenja Podgora	Črnomelj
Dolenja Ravan	Gorenja vas-Poljane
Dolenja Stara vas	Šentjernej
Dolenja Trebuša	Tolmin
Dolenja vas pri Artičah	Brežice
Dolenja vas pri Čatežu	Trebnje
Dolenja vas pri Črnomlju	Črnomelj
Dolenja vas pri Krškem	Krško
Dolenja vas pri Mirni Peči	Mirna Peč
Dolenja vas pri Polhovem Gradcu	Dobrova-Polhov Gradec
Dolenja vas pri Polici	Grosuplje
Dolenja vas pri Raki	Krško
Dolenja vas pri Temenici	Ivančna Gorica
Dolenja vas	Cerknica
Dolenja vas	Divača
Dolenja vas	Novo Mesto
Dolenja vas	Prebold
Dolenja vas	Ribnica
Dolenja vas	Zagorje ob Savi
Dolenja vas	Železniki
Dolenja Žaga	Kostel
Dolenja Žetina	Gorenja vas-Poljane
Dolenjci	Črnomelj
Dolenje Brdo	Gorenja vas-Poljane
Dolenje Dole	Škocjan
Dolenje Gradišče pri Šentjjerneju	Šentjernej
Dolenje Gradišče	Dolenjske Toplice
Dolenje Grčevje	Novo Mesto
Dolenje Jesenice	Trebnje
Dolenje Jezero	Cerknica
Dolenje Kališče	Velike Lašče
Dolenje Kamenje pri Dobrniču	Trebnje
Dolenje Kamenje	Novo Mesto
Dolenje Karteljevo	Novo Mesto
Dolenje Kronovo	Novo Mesto
Dolenje Laknice	Trebnje
Dolenje Lakovnice	Novo Mesto
Dolenje Medvedje Selo	Trebnje
Dolenje Mokro Polje	Šentjernej
Dolenje Otave	Cerknica
Dolenje Podpoljane	Ribnica
Dolenje Poljane	Loška Dolina
Dolenje Polje	Dolenjske Toplice
Dolenje Ponikve	Trebnje
Dolenje pri Jelšanah	Ilirska Bistrica
Dolenje Radulje	Škocjan
Dolenje Selce	Trebnje
Dolenje Skopice	Brežice
Dolenje Sušice	Dolenjske Toplice
Dolenje Vrhpolje	Šentjernej
Dolenje Zabukovje	Trebnje
Dolenje	Ajdovščina
Dolenje	Domžale
Dolenje	Sežana
Dolenji Boštanj	Sevnica
Dolenji Globodol	Mirna Peč
Dolenji Lazi	Ribnica
Dolenji Leskovec	Krško
Dolenji Maharovec	Šentjernej
Dolenji Novaki	Cerkno
Dolenji Podboršt pri Trebnjem	Trebnje
Dolenji Podboršt	Mirna Peč
Dolenji Podšumberk	Trebnje
Dolenji Potok	Kostel
Dolenji Radenci	Črnomelj
Dolenji Suhadol	Novo Mesto
Dolenji Suhor pri Vinici	Črnomelj
Dolenji Vrh	Trebnje
Dolenjske Toplice	Dolenjske Toplice
Dolga Brda	Prevalje
Dolga Gora	Šentjur
Dolga Njiva pri Šentlovren.	Trebnje
Dolga Poljana	Ajdovščina
Dolga Raka	Krško
Dolga vas	Kočevje
Dolga vas	Lendava
Dolge Njive	Gorenja vas-Poljane
Dolge Njive	Lenart
Dolgi Laz	Tolmin
Dolgi Vrh	Slovenska Bistrica
Dolgo Brdo pri Mlinšah	Zagorje ob Savi
Dolgo Brdo	Litija
Dolgo Brdo	Ljubljana
Dolgovaške Gorice	Lendava
Dolič	Destrnik
Dolič	Kuzma
Dolina pri Lendavi	Lendava
Dolina	Puconci
Dolina	Tržič
Dolje	Tolmin
Dolnja Bistrica	Črenšovci
Dolnja Bitnja	Ilirska Bistrica
Dolnja Briga	Kočevje
Dolnja Košana	Pivka
Dolnja Lokvica	Metlika
Dolnja Paka	Črnomelj
Dolnja Počehova	Pesnica
Dolnja Prekopa	Krško
Dolnja Stara vas	Škocjan
Dolnja Težka Voda	Novo Mesto
Dolnje Brezovo	Sevnica
Dolnje Cerovo	Brda
Dolnje Dobravice	Metlika
Dolnje Impolje	Sevnica
Dolnje Ležeče	Divača
Dolnje Ložine	Kočevje
Dolnje Mraševo	Novo Mesto
Dolnje Orle	Sevnica
Dolnje Prapreče	Trebnje
Dolnje Retje	Velike Lašče
Dolnje Vreme	Divača
Dolnji Ajdovec	Žužemberk
Dolnji Kot	Žužemberk
Dolnji Križ	Žužemberk
Dolnji Lakoš	Lendava
Dolnji Slaveči	Grad
Dolnji Suhor pri Metliki	Metlika
Dolnji Vrh	Litija
Dolnji Zemon	Ilirska Bistrica
Dolsko	Dol pri Ljubljani
Dol-Suha	Mozirje
Dolšce	Krško
Dolščaki	Velike Lašče
Dolž	Novo Mesto
Domajinci	Cankova
Domanjševci	Šalovci
Dombrava	Nova Gorica
Domžale	Domžale
Donačka Gora	Rogatec
Dorfarje	Škofja Loka
Dornava	Dornava
Dornberk	Nova Gorica
Dornice	Vodice
Doropolje	Šentjur
Doslovče	Žirovnica
Dovje	Kranjska Gora
Dovško	Krško
Dovže	Mislinja
Draga pri Sinjem Vrhu	Črnomelj
Draga pri Šentrupertu	Trebnje
Draga	Loški Potok
Draga	Nova Gorica
Draga	Novo Mesto
Draga	Škofja Loka
Draga	Štore
Dragatuš	Črnomelj
Drage	Metlika
Dragočajna	Medvode
Dragomelj	Domžale
Dragomer	Vrhnika
Dragomilo	Šmarje pri Jelšah
Dragomlja vas	Metlika
Dragonja vas	Kidričevo
Dragonja	Piran
Dragoši	Črnomelj
Dragotinci	Sveti Jurij ob Ščavnici
Dragovanja vas	Črnomelj
Dragovič	Juršinci
Dragovšek	Litija
Dragučova	Pesnica
Drakovci	Ljutomer
Drakšl	Ormož
Drama	Šentjernej
Dramlja	Brežice
Dramlje	Šentjur
Drankovec	Pesnica
Drašča vas	Žužemberk
Drašiči	Metlika
Dravci	Videm
Dravče	Vuzenica
Dravinjski Vrh	Videm
Dravograd	Dravograd
Dravski Dvor	Miklavž na Dravskem Polju
Draža vas	Slovenske Konjice
Dražen Vrh - del	Sveta Ana (občina)
Dražen Vrh - del	Šentilj
Draženci	Hajdina
Draževnik	Dobrova-Polhov Gradec
Dražgoše	Železniki
Dražica	Borovnica
Drbetinci	Sveti Andraž v Slov. Goricah
Drča	Šentjernej
Drečji Vrh	Trebnje
Dren	Kostel
Drenik	Škofljica
Drenje	Dolenjske Toplice
Drenov Grič	Vrhnika
Drenovec pri Bukovju	Brežice
Drenovec pri Leskovcu	Krško
Drenovec	Črnomelj
Drenovec	Zavrč
Drensko Rebro	Kozje
Drešinja vas	Žalec
Drevenik	Rogaška Slatina
Drežnica	Kobarid
Drežnik	Črnomelj
Drežnik	Kostel
Drežniške Ravne	Kobarid
Drganja Sela	Novo Mesto
Drnovk	Brda
Drnovo	Krško
Drobinsko	Šentjur
Drobočnik	Tolmin
Drobtinci	Gornja Radgona
Drožanje	Sevnica
Drskovče	Pivka
Drstelja	Destrnik
Drtija	Moravče
Drumlažno	Slovenska Bistrica
Drušče	Sevnica
Družina	Zagorje ob Savi
Družinska vas	Novo Mesto
Družmirje	Šoštanj
Drvanja	Benedikt
Dule	Ribnica
Dule	Škocjan
Dunaj	Krško
Dupeljne	Lukovica
Duplje	Vipava
Dutovlje	Sežana
Dvor pri Polhovem Gradcu	Dobrova-Polhov Gradec
Dvor	Litija
Dvor	Ljubljana
Dvor	Šmarje pri Jelšah
Dvor	Žužemberk
Dvorce	Brežice
Dvori	Koper
Dvorjane	Duplek
Dvorje	Cerklje na Gorenjskem
Dvorje	Moravče
Dvorska vas	Radovljica
Dvorska vas	Velike Lašče
