= Drama, Šentjernej =

Drama
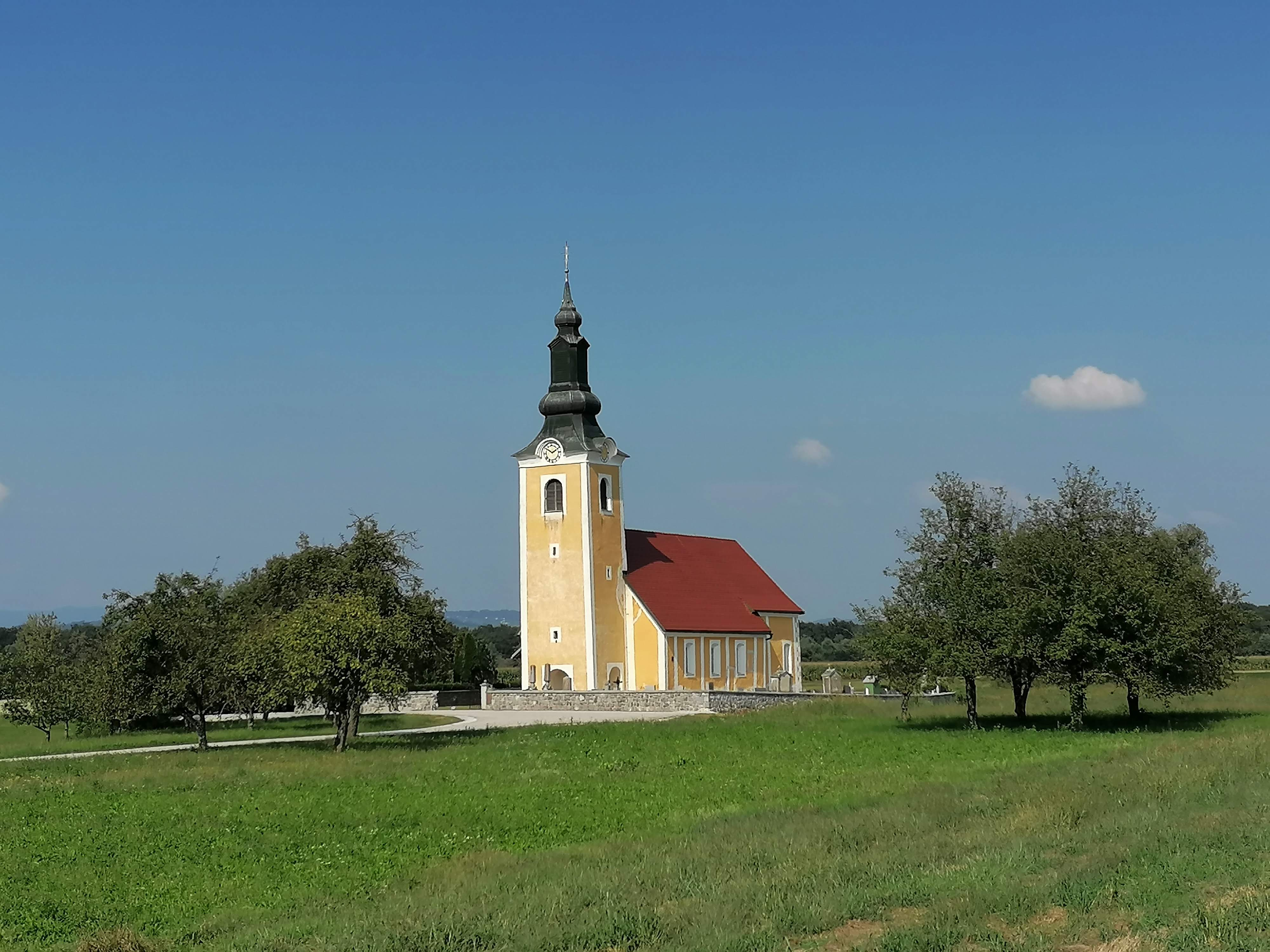

- Location in Slovenia
- Coordinates: 45°52′13.02″N 15°20′15.33″E
- Country: Slovenia
- Traditional region: Lower Carniola
- Statistical region: Southeast Slovenia
- Municipality: Šentjernej

Area
  - Total: 1.62 km^{2} (0.63 sq mi)
- Elevation: 151.9 m (498 ft)

Population (2002)
  - Total: 90
- Postal code: 8310

Drama (pronounced [ˈdɾaːma]) is a village in the Municipality of Šentjernej in southeastern Slovenia. The area is part of the traditional region of Lower Carniola. It is now included in the Southeast Slovenia Statistical Region. It includes the hamlets of Dolenja Gomila (German: Untergomila), formerly an independent settlement, to the west and Otok (German: Gutenwerth) to the northwest.

== Geography ==
Drama is a semi-clustered village in a level area near the right bank of the Krka River that is subject to seasonal flooding. Towards the north, toward the river, there are wet meadows and tilled fields in an area known as Ključi. The area to the west known as Brod (literally, 'ford') is reminiscent of the ford that existed here before the bridge was built in 1910. The grassy areas south of Brod are known as Mihovica and Roje. East of Drama there are fields and the Kozarje meadows, where there are intermittent springs that feed Curek Creek.

== History ==
The hamlet of Otok (literally, 'island') was formerly an island in the Krka River until its course was regulated, and traces of the old river channel can still be seen. In the first century AD, a Roman fortification stood at the site, along the road from Emona to Neviodunum. There are remains of a moat in Drama that controlled access to Otok from the south. In the 9th century AD, the area came under Croatian control, and was then controlled by the Draškovec family, which had its castle in Mihovica as lesser nobles subordinate to the lords of Višnja Gora. This was followed by a succession of owners, including the Andechs, Babenberg, and Spanheim families, Ottokar II of Bohemia, and the Habsburgs. A treaty of 1074 with the Patriarchate of Aquileia indicates that the Bishopric of Freising founded a parish here, which was transferred to Škocjan in 1492.

Along with Klevevž and Prežek, Otok was one of three major properties of the Bishops of Freising in Lower Carniola. It was mentioned as a market in 1251, a judge was mentioned in 1254, a court was established in 1257, a castle mentioned in 1261, and a toll station in 1301. Coins minted there between 1200 and 1240 bore the name Gutenwerth.

Otok suffered under Croatian and Hungarian attacks, and latter Ottoman raids. It was plundered by Ottoman forces in 1469, and then destroyed and burned in 1473, from which it never recovered. The Bishops of Freising moved their offices to nearby Hrvaški Brod, also transferring the name Gutenwerth to the new location. In the 17th and 18th centuries, Drama served as a river port for the surrounding countryside until the road from Novo Mesto to Sisak was built at the end of the 18th century. A road linking Dobrava pri Škocjanu to Šentjernej was built past the village in 1968.

== Church ==
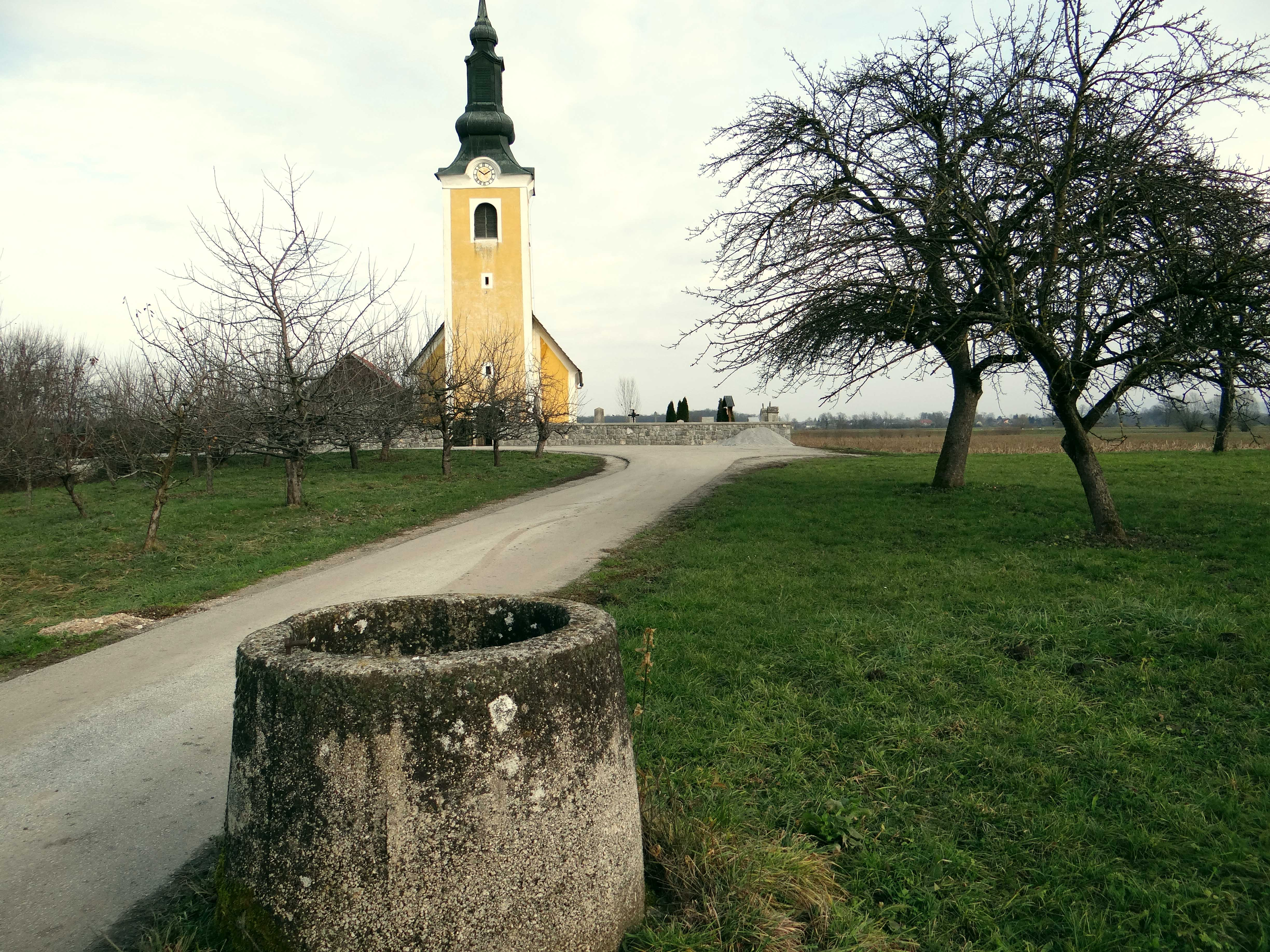
St. Nicholas's Church and a Roman well

The local church—built north of the village in what used to be the settlement of Otok and on the edge of what was the medieval market town of Gutenwerth, which was destroyed in the late 15th century—is dedicated to Saint Nicholas and belongs to the Parish of Šentjernej. It was first mentioned in written documents dating to 1290, but the current building is a result of a major rebuilding in the Baroque style in the 18th century.
