= Pristavica =

Pristavica may refer to a number of settlements in Slovenia:

- Pristavica, Rogaška Slatina
- Pristavica, Šentjernej
- Pristavica pri Velikem Gabru
