= Prapreče =

Prapreče may refer to the following settlements in Slovenia:

- Prapreče, Trbovlje, Styria
- Prapreče, Vransko, Styria
- Prapreče, Zagorje ob Savi, Upper Carniola
- Prapreče, Žužemberk, Lower Carniola
- Prapreče pri Šentjerneju, Lower Carniola
- Prapreče pri Straži, Lower Carniola
- Prapreče pri Trebnjem, Lower Carniola
