= Žvabovo =

- Location in Slovenia
- Coordinates: 45°49′41.44″N 15°20′7.46″E
- Country: Slovenia
- Traditional region: Lower Carniola
- Statistical region: Southeast Slovenia
- Municipality: Šentjernej

Area
  - Total: 0.51 km^{2} (0.20 sq mi)
- Elevation: 229.9 m (754 ft)

Population (2002)
  - Total: 30
- Postal code: 8310

Žvabovo (pronounced [ˈʒʋaːbɔʋɔ]; in older sources also Švabovo, German: Schwabou) is a small settlement west of Šmarje in the Municipality of Šentjernej in southeastern Slovenia. The entire municipality is part of the traditional region of Lower Carniola and is now included in the Southeast Slovenia Statistical Region.
