= Pristavica, Šentjernej =

Pristavica
- Location in Slovenia
- Coordinates: 45°51′30.53″N 15°16′34.4″E
- Country: Slovenia
- Traditional region: Lower Carniola
- Statistical region: Southeast Slovenia
- Municipality: Šentjernej

Area
  - Total: 0.98 km^{2} (0.38 sq mi)
- Elevation: 167.6 m (550 ft)

Population (2002)
  - Total: 38
- Postal code: 8310

Pristavica (pronounced [pɾiˈstaːʋitsa]) is a small settlement in the Municipality of Šentjernej in southeastern Slovenia. It lies on a slight elevation above the right bank of the Krka River southwest of Gorenja Gomila. The entire municipality is part of the traditional region of Lower Carniola. It is now included in the Southeast Slovenia Statistical Region.
