= Gorenje Mokro Polje =

- Location in Slovenia
- Coordinates: 45°49′46.1″N 15°17′26.7″E
- Country: Slovenia
- Traditional region: Lower Carniola
- Statistical region: Southeast Slovenia
- Municipality: Šentjernej

Area
  - Total: 1.01 km^{2} (0.39 sq mi)
- Elevation: 191.4 m (628 ft)

Population (2002)
  - Total: 50
- Postal code: 8310

Gorenje Mokro Polje (pronounced [ɡɔˈɾeːnjɛ ˈmɔːkɾɔ ˈpoːljɛ]) is a settlement west of Šentjernej in southeastern Slovenia. The area is part of the traditional region of Lower Carniola. It is now included in the Southeast Slovenia Statistical Region.

The local church, built inside a walled enclosure in the western part of the settlement, is dedicated to Saint Vitus (Slovene: sveti Vid) and belongs to the Parish of Šentjernej. It is mentioned in written documents dating to 1436, but owes its current Baroque style to a major rebuilding in the 18th century.
