= Roje, Šentjernej =

Roje
- Location in Slovenia
- Coordinates: 45°51′41.9″N 15°20′34.66″E
- Country: Slovenia
- Traditional region: Lower Carniola
- Statistical region: Southeast Slovenia
- Municipality: Šentjernej

Area
  - Total: 3.27 km^{2} (1.26 sq mi)
- Elevation: 156.9 m (515 ft)

Population (2002)
  - Total: 90
- Postal code: 8310

Roje (pronounced [ˈɾoːjɛ]) is a settlement north of Šentjernej in southeastern Slovenia. The municipality is part of the traditional region of Lower Carniola. It is now included in the Southeast Slovenia Statistical Region.

Archaeological excavations in the settlement in the early 1960s revealed two Roman graves, part of a small local cemetery.
