= Vrbovce =

Vrbovce may refer to places:

- Vrbovce, Slovakia, a village and municipality in Slovakia
- Vrbovce, Slovenia, a settlement in Slovenia
