= Šmalčja Vas =

- Location in Slovenia
- Coordinates: 45°50′52.44″N 15°19′47.03″E
- Country: Slovenia
- Traditional region: Lower Carniola
- Statistical region: Southeast Slovenia
- Municipality: Šentjernej

Area
  - Total: 0.92 km^{2} (0.36 sq mi)
- Elevation: 176 m (577 ft)

Population (2002)
  - Total: 165
- Postal code: 8310

Šmalčja Vas (pronounced [ˈʃmaːu̯tʃja ˈʋaːs]; Slovene: Šmalčja vas, German: Schmalzendorf) is a settlement immediately north of the town of Šentjernej in southeastern Slovenia. The Municipality of Šentjernej is part of the traditional region of Lower Carniola. It is now included in the Southeast Slovenia Statistical Region.
