= Dolenje Gradišče =

Dolenje Gradišče may refer to the following places in Slovenia:

- Dolenje Gradišče, Dolenjske Toplice, a village in the Municipality of Dolenjske Toplice
- Dolenje Gradišče pri Šentjerneju, a village in the Municipality of pri Šentjernej

== See also ==
- Gradišče (disambiguation)
- Gorenje Gradišče (disambiguation)
