= Rakovnik =

Rakovnik may refer to places:

- Rakovník, a town in the Czech Republic
- Rakovnik, Medvode, a settlement in Slovenia
- Rakovnik, Šentjernej, a settlement in Slovenia
- Rakovnik pri Birčni Vasi, a settlement in Slovenia
- Rakovnik pri Šentrupertu, a settlement in Slovenia
