= Ostrog, Šentjernej =

Ostrog
- Location in Slovenia
- Coordinates: 45°51′31.73″N 15°22′46.68″E
- Country: Slovenia
- Traditional region: Lower Carniola
- Statistical region: Southeast Slovenia
- Municipality: Šentjernej

Area
  - Total: 1.17 km^{2} (0.45 sq mi)
- Elevation: 156 m (512 ft)

Population (2002)
  - Total: 193
- Postal code: 8310

Ostrog (pronounced [ɔˈstɾoːk]) is a small village north of Dolnja Prekopa in the Municipality of Šentjernej in southeastern Slovenia. Its territory extends north of the main settlement to the banks of the Krka River. The entire municipality is part of the traditional region of Lower Carniola. It is now included in the Southeast Slovenia Statistical Region.
