= Zameško =

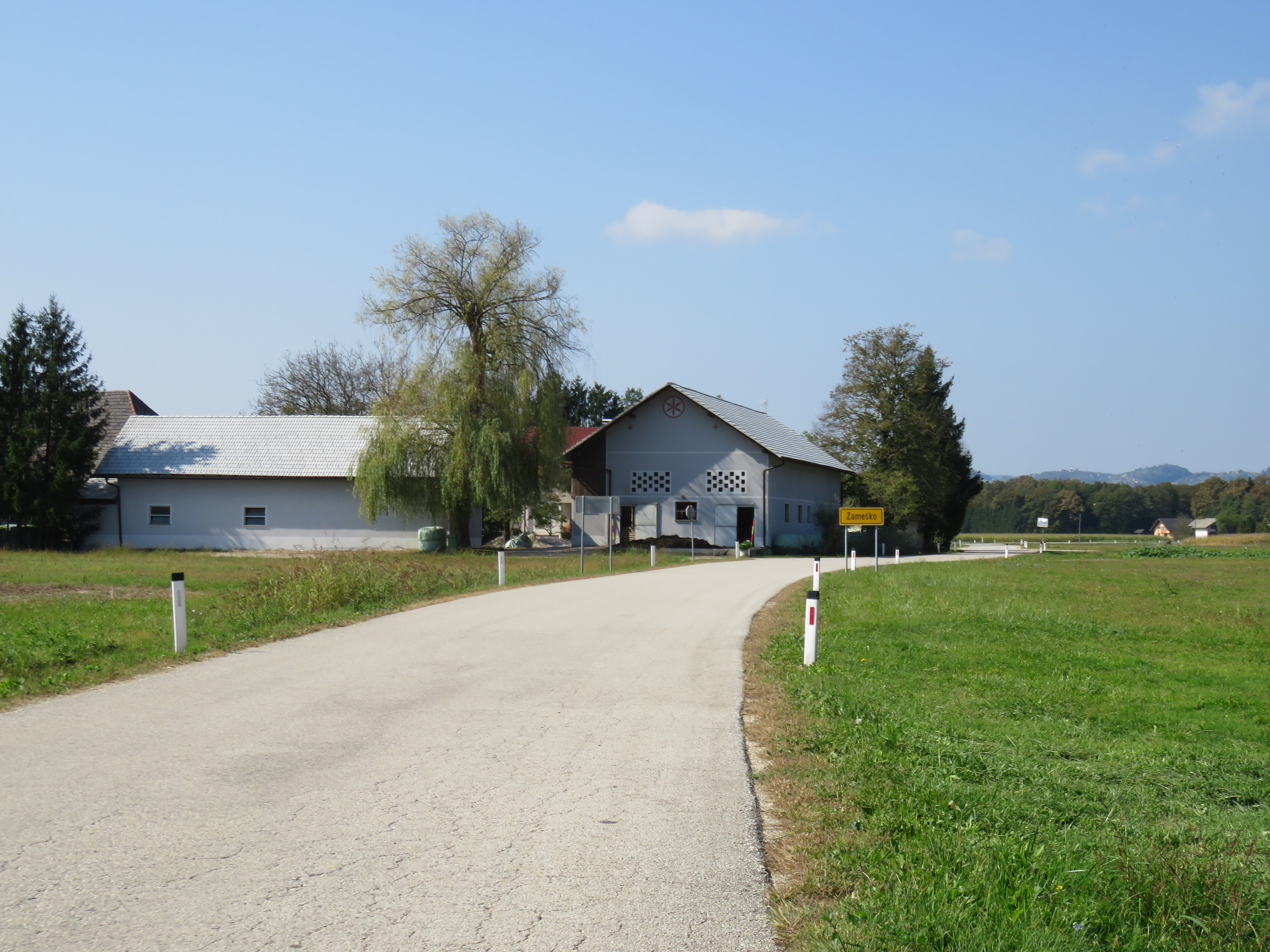

- Location in Slovenia
- Coordinates: 45°52′47.39″N 15°21′47.84″E
- Country: Slovenia
- Traditional region: Lower Carniola
- Statistical region: Southeast Slovenia
- Municipality: Šentjernej

Area
  - Total: 2.5 km^{2} (0.97 sq mi)
- Elevation: 152.9 m (502 ft)

Population (2002)
  - Total: 105
- Postal code: 8310

Zameško (pronounced [zaˈmeːʃkɔ]) is a small settlement on the left bank of the Krka River in the Municipality of Šentjernej in southeastern Slovenia. The entire municipality is part of the traditional region of Lower Carniola and is now included in the Southeast Slovenia Statistical Region.
