= Čadraže =

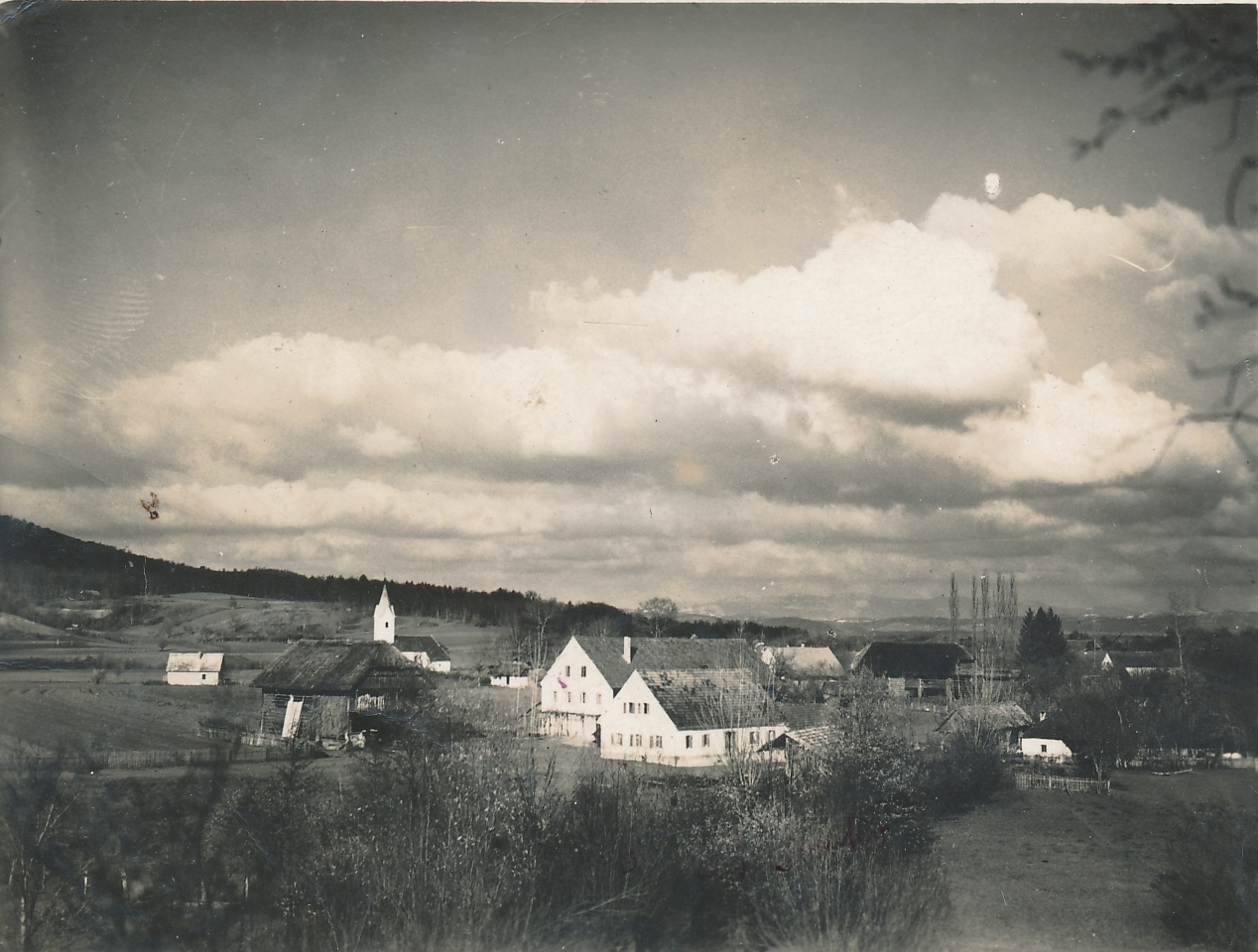
- Postcard of Čadraže in the 1930s

- Location in Slovenia
- Coordinates: 45°51′55.61″N 15°17′48.71″E
- Country: Slovenia
- Traditional region: Lower Carniola
- Statistical region: Southeast Slovenia
- Municipality: Šentjernej

Area
  - Total: 2.05 km^{2} (0.79 sq mi)
- Elevation: 157.3 m (516 ft)

Population (2002)
  - Total: 76
- Postal code: 8310

Čadraže (pronounced [ˈtʃaːdɾaʒɛ]; in older sources also Čadreže) is a village on the right bank of the Krka River in the Municipality of Šentjernej in southeastern Slovenia. The area is part of the traditional region of Lower Carniola. It is now included in the Southeast Slovenia Statistical Region.

The local church, built on top of a Hallstatt period tumulus on the western outskirts of the settlement, is dedicated to Saint Ulrich (Slovene: sveti Urh) and belongs to the Parish of Šentjernej. It is a medieval structure that was greatly rebuilt in the Baroque style in the 17th century.
