= Zapuže, Šentjernej =

Zapuže
- Location in Slovenia
- Coordinates: 45°49′12.04″N 15°17′44.13″E
- Country: Slovenia
- Traditional region: Lower Carniola
- Statistical region: Southeast Slovenija
- Municipality: Šentjernej

Area
  - Total: 0.33 km^{2} (0.13 sq mi)
- Elevation: 220.5 m (723 ft)

Population (2002)
  - Total: 67
- Postal code: 8310

Zapuže (pronounced [ˈzaːpuʒɛ]) is a small settlement northwest of Orehovica in the Municipality of Šentjernej in southeastern Slovenia. The entire municipality is part of the traditional region of Lower Carniola and is now included in the Southeast Slovenia Statistical Region.
