= Dolenja Stara Vas =

- Location in Slovenia
- Coordinates: 45°50′15.91″N 15°21′12.09″E
- Country: Slovenia
- Traditional region: Lower Carniola
- Statistical region: Southeast Slovenia
- Municipality: Šentjernej

Area
  - Total: 0.69 km^{2} (0.27 sq mi)
- Elevation: 185.4 m (608 ft)

Population (2002)
  - Total: 187
- Postal code: 8310

Dolenja Stara Vas (pronounced [dɔˈleːnja ˈstaːɾa ˈʋaːs]; Slovene: Dolenja Stara vas, German: Unteraltendorf) is a settlement immediately southeast of the town of Šentjernej in southeastern Slovenia. The area is part of the traditional region of Lower Carniola. It is now included in the Southeast Slovenia Statistical Region. The village belongs to the Village Community of Grmovlje.

The local church, built on hill to the east of the settlement, is dedicated to Saint Francis Xavier and belongs to the Parish of Šentjernej. It was built in 1745 to replace an older church dedicated to Saint Stephen.
