= Razdrto, Šentjernej =

Razdrto
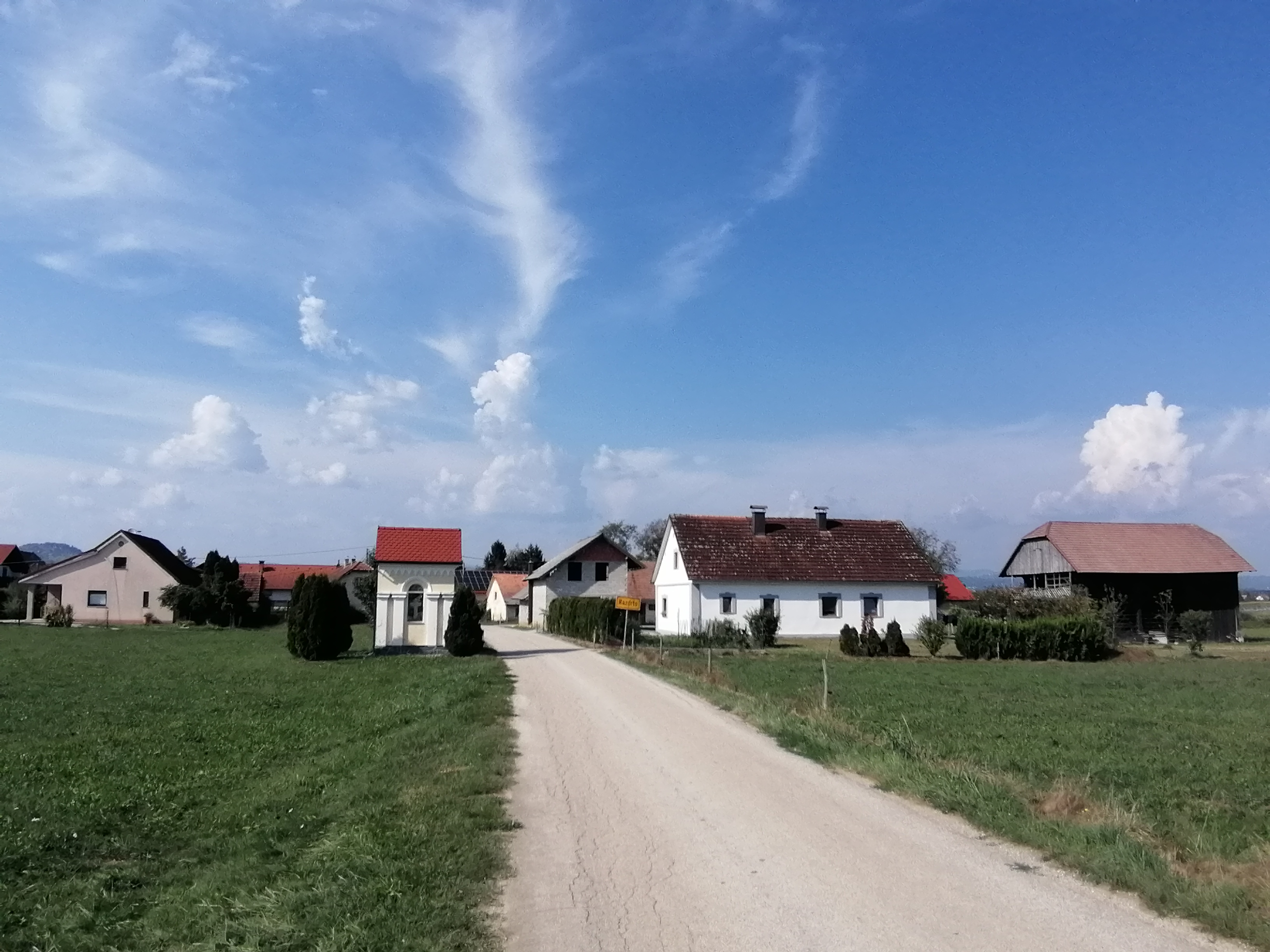

- Location in Slovenia
- Coordinates: 45°51′3.88″N 15°19′13.26″E
- Country: Slovenia
- Traditional region: Lower Carniola
- Statistical region: Southeast Slovenia
- Municipality: Šentjernej

Area
  - Total: 0.57 km^{2} (0.22 sq mi)
- Elevation: 170.8 m (560 ft)

Population (2002)
  - Total: 38
- Postal code: 8310

Razdrto (pronounced [ɾaˈzdərtɔ]) is a small settlement north of Gorenja Brezovica in the Municipality of Šentjernej in southeastern Slovenia. The municipality is part of the traditional region of Lower Carniola. It is now included in the Southeast Slovenia Statistical Region.

== Name ==
The name Razdrto is shared with other settlements in Slovenia. It is derived from Slavic *orzdьrto(je) (poľe) 'cleared (field)', referring to early settlement and agricultural use of the area.
