= Apnenik =

Apnenik may refer to:

- Apnenik pri Boštanju, a settlement in Sevnica, Slovenia
- Apnenik pri Velikem Trnu, a settlement in Krško, Slovenia
- Apnenik, Šentjernej, a settlement in Šentjernej, Slovenia
