= Loka, Šentjernej =

Loka
- Location in Slovenia
- Coordinates: 45°49′50.83″N 15°18′16.31″E
- Country: Slovenia
- Traditional region: Lower Carniola
- Statistical region: Southeast Slovenia
- Municipality: Šentjernej

Area
  - Total: 1.36 km^{2} (0.53 sq mi)
- Elevation: 186.6 m (612 ft)

Population (2002)
  - Total: 109
- Postal code: 8310

Loka (pronounced [ˈloːka]) is a village west of Šentjernej in southeastern Slovenia. The area is part of the traditional region of Lower Carniola. It is now included in the Southeast Slovenia Statistical Region.

Remains of a Roman villa rustica have been found close to the settlement.
