= Ledeča Vas =

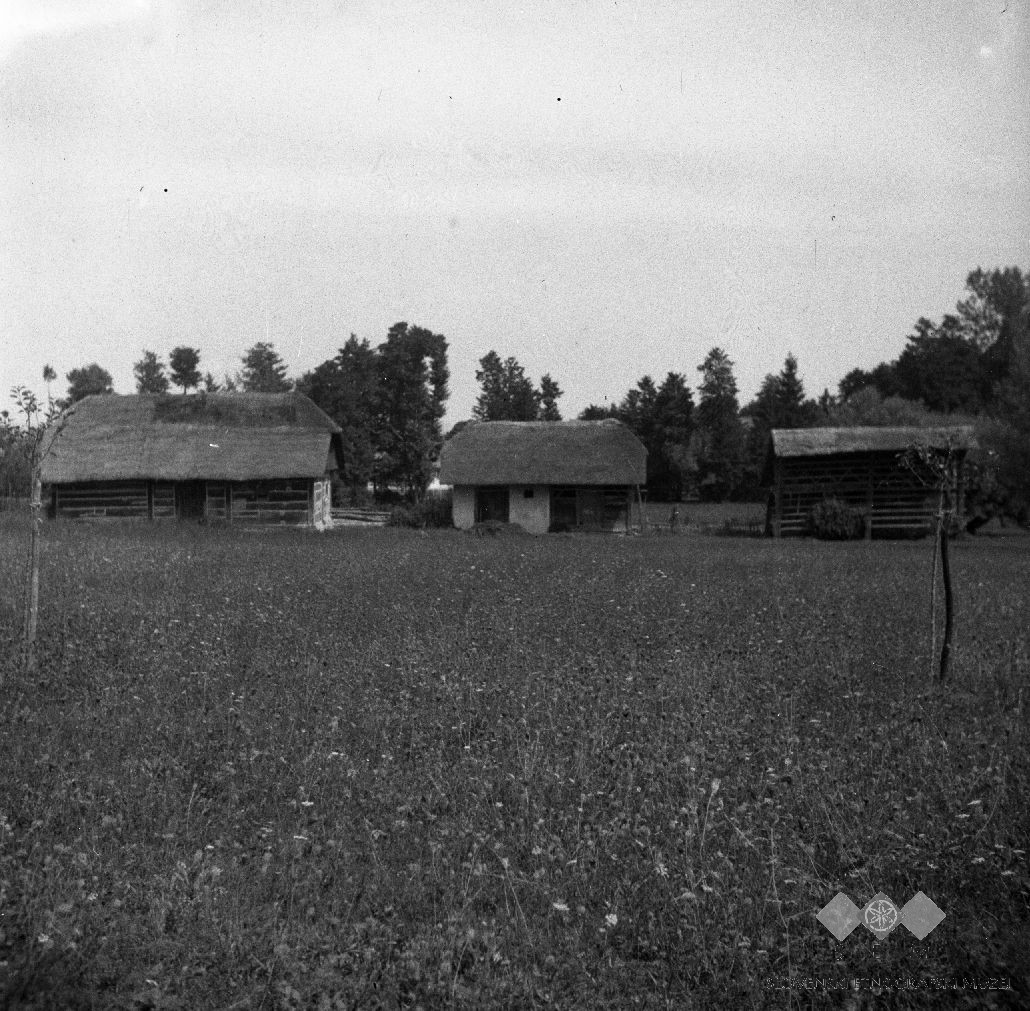
- A farm in Ledeča Vas in 1952

- Location in Slovenia
- Coordinates: 45°50′38.43″N 15°22′1.36″E
- Country: Slovenia
- Traditional region: Lower Carniola
- Statistical region: Southeast Slovenia
- Municipality: Šentjernej

Area
  - Total: 1.09 km^{2} (0.42 sq mi)
- Elevation: 171.3 m (562 ft)

Population (2002)
  - Total: 73
- Postal code: 8310

Ledeča Vas (pronounced [lɛˈdeːtʃa ˈʋaːs]; Slovene: Ledeča vas, German: Ladendorf) is a village east of Šentjernej, at the foot of the Gorjanci Mountains in southeastern Slovenia. The area is part of the traditional region of Lower Carniola. It is now included in the Southeast Slovenia Statistical Region.

The local church, built on a slight elevation next to a forest outside the main settlement, is dedicated to Saint Anne and belongs to the Parish of Šentjernej. It was mentioned in written documents dating to 1367, but was extensively rebuilt in the 17th and early 20th centuries.
