= Gorenji Maharovec =

- Location in Slovenia
- Coordinates: 45°50′23.84″N 15°18′28.08″E
- Country: Slovenia
- Traditional region: Lower Carniola
- Statistical region: Southeast Slovenia
- Municipality: Šentjernej

Area
  - Total: 0.95 km^{2} (0.37 sq mi)
- Elevation: 187.8 m (616 ft)

Population (2002)
  - Total: 65
- Postal code: 8310

Gorenji Maharovec (pronounced [ɡɔˈɾeːnji maxaˈɾɔːʋəts] or [ɡɔˈɾeːnji maxaˈɾoːʋəts]; German: Obermacharouz) is a settlement west of Šentjernej in southeastern Slovenia. The area is part of the traditional region of Lower Carniola and is now included in the Southeast Slovenia Statistical Region.
