= Čisti Breg =

- Location in Slovenia
- Coordinates: 45°52′33.03″N 15°22′21.6″E
- Country: Slovenia
- Traditional region: Lower Carniola
- Statistical region: Southeast Slovenia
- Municipality: Šentjernej

Area
  - Total: 0.35 km^{2} (0.14 sq mi)
- Elevation: 151.8 m (498 ft)

Population (2002)
  - Total: 24
- Postal code: 8310

Čisti Breg (pronounced [ˈtʃiːsti ˈbɾeːk]) is a small settlement on the left bank of the Krka River in the Municipality of Šentjernej in southeastern Slovenia. The area is part of the traditional region of Lower Carniola. It is now included in the Southeast Slovenia Statistical Region.
