= Sela pri Šentjerneju =

- Location in Slovenia
- Coordinates: 45°49′39.68″N 15°21′6.34″E
- Country: Slovenia
- Traditional region: Lower Carniola
- Statistical region: Southeast Slovenia
- Municipality: Šentjernej

Area
  - Total: 0.55 km^{2} (0.21 sq mi)
- Elevation: 209.7 m (688 ft)

Population (2002)
  - Total: 100
- Postal code: 8310

Sela pri Šentjerneju (pronounced [ˈseːla pɾi ʃɛntjɛɾˈnɛːju]) is a settlement south of Šentjernej in southeastern Slovenia. The Municipality of Šentjernej is part of the traditional region of Lower Carniola. It is now included in the Southeast Slovenia Statistical Region.

== Name ==
The name of the settlement was changed from Sela to Sela pri Šentjerneju in 1953.
