= Gorenje Vrhpolje =

- Location in Slovenia
- Coordinates: 45°48′52.94″N 15°19′38.91″E
- Country: Slovenia
- Traditional region: Lower Carniola
- Statistical region: Southeast Slovenia
- Municipality: Šentjernej

Area
  - Total: 2.25 km^{2} (0.87 sq mi)
- Elevation: 262.5 m (861 ft)

Population (2002)
  - Total: 327
- Postal code: 8310

Gorenje Vrhpolje (pronounced [ɡɔˈɾeːnjɛ ˈʋəɾxpɔljɛ]; German: Oberfeld) is a settlement southwest of Šentjernej in southeastern Slovenia. The area is part of the traditional region of Lower Carniola. It is now included in the Southeast Slovenia Statistical Region.

== Church ==
The local church, built south of the village, is dedicated to Saint Urban and belongs to the Parish of Šentjernej. It is mentioned in written documents dating to 1439, but owes its current Baroque style to a major rebuilding in the 18th century. Fragments of the medieval wall paintings are still visible on the exterior northern wall of the nave.
