= Gruča =

- Location in Slovenia
- Coordinates: 45°50′46.12″N 15°22′26.91″E
- Country: Slovenia
- Traditional region: Lower Carniola
- Statistical region: Southeast Slovenia
- Municipality: Šentjernej

Area
  - Total: 0.51 km^{2} (0.20 sq mi)
- Elevation: 168.2 m (552 ft)

Population (2002)
  - Total: 58
- Postal code: 8310

Gruča (pronounced [ˈɡɾuːtʃa]) is a small settlement east of Šentjernej in southeastern Slovenia. The area is part of the traditional region of Lower Carniola. It is now included in the Southeast Slovenia Statistical Region.
