= Gorenje Gradišče =

Gorenje Gradišče may refer to the following places in Slovenia:

- Gorenje Gradišče, Dolenjske Toplice, a village in the Municipality of Dolenjske Toplice
- Gorenje Gradišče pri Šentjerneju, a village in the Municipality of Šentjernej

== See also ==
- Gorenje (disambiguation)
- Gradišče (disambiguation)
- Dolenje Gradišče (disambiguation)
