= Šentjakob =

- Location in Slovenia
- Coordinates: 45°51′55.14″N 15°22′19.95″E
- Country: Slovenia
- Traditional region: Lower Carniola
- Statistical region: Southeast Slovenia
- Municipality: Šentjernej

Area
  - Total: 2.12 km^{2} (0.82 sq mi)
- Elevation: 153.5 m (504 ft)

Population (2002)
  - Total: 34
- Postal code: 8310

Šentjakob (pronounced [ʃɛnˈtjaːkɔp] or [ʃənˈtjaːkɔp]; German: Sankt Jakob) is a settlement on the right bank of the Krka River in the Municipality of Šentjernej in southeastern Slovenia. The municipality is part of the traditional region of Lower Carniola. It is now included in the Southeast Slovenia Statistical Region.
