= Volčkova Vas =

- Location in Slovenia
- Coordinates: 45°49′48.36″N 15°21′30.05″E
- Country: Slovenia
- Traditional region: Lower Carniola
- Statistical region: Southeast Slovenia
- Municipality: Šentjernej

Area
  - Total: 0.76 km^{2} (0.29 sq mi)
- Elevation: 214.7 m (704 ft)

Population (2002)
  - Total: 72
- Postal code: 8310

Volčkova Vas (pronounced [ʋɔu̯tʃˈkɔːʋa ˈʋaːs] or [ʋɔu̯tʃˈkoːʋa ˈʋaːs]; Slovene: Volčkova vas, German: Wolfsdorf) is a small settlement in the foothills of the Žumberak/Gorjanci range, southeast of Šentjernej in southeastern Slovenia. The entire Municipality of Šentjernej is part of the traditional region of Lower Carniola and is now included in the Southeast Slovenia Statistical Region.
