= Vrh pri Šentjerneju =

- Location in Slovenia
- Coordinates: 45°50′14.9″N 15°19′35.22″E
- Country: Slovenia
- Traditional region: Lower Carniola
- Statistical region: Southeast Slovenia
- Municipality: Šentjernej

Area
  - Total: 0.52 km^{2} (0.20 sq mi)
- Elevation: 200.6 m (658 ft)

Population (2002)
  - Total: 122
- Postal code: 8310

Vrh pri Šentjerneju (pronounced [ˈʋəɾx pɾi ʃɛntjɛɾˈnɛːju]) is a small settlement west of Šentjernej in southeastern Slovenia. The entire Municipality of Šentjernej is part of the traditional region of Lower Carniola and is now included in the Southeast Slovenia Statistical Region.

== Name ==
The name of the settlement was changed from Vrh to Vrh pri Šentjerneju in 1953.
