= Dolenje Vrhpolje =

- Location in Slovenia
- Coordinates: 45°49′18.77″N 15°20′6.86″E
- Country: Slovenia
- Traditional region: Lower Carniola
- Statistical region: Southeast Slovenia
- Municipality: Šentjernej

Area
  - Total: 1.05 km^{2} (0.41 sq mi)
- Elevation: 231.5 m (760 ft)

Population (2002)
  - Total: 143
- Postal code: 8310

Dolenje Vrhpolje (pronounced [dɔˈleːnjɛ ˈʋəɾxpɔljɛ]; German: Unterfeld) is a settlement south of Šentjernej at the foot of the Gorjanci Mountains in southeastern Slovenia. The area is part of the traditional region of Lower Carniola. It is now included in the Southeast Slovenia Statistical Region.
