= Žerjavin =

- Location in Slovenia
- Coordinates: 45°49′43.37″N 15°16′9.77″E
- Country: Slovenia
- Traditional region: Lower Carniola
- Statistical region: Southeast Slovenia
- Municipality: Šentjernej

Area
  - Total: 1.46 km^{2} (0.56 sq mi)
- Elevation: 204.7 m (672 ft)

Population (2002)
  - Total: 12
- Postal code: 8310

Žerjavin (pronounced [ʒɛɾjaˈʋiːn] or [ʒɛˈɾjaːʋin]) is a small settlement in the hills west of Dolenje Mokro Polje in the Municipality of Šentjernej in southeastern Slovenia. The entire municipality is part of the traditional region of Lower Carniola and is now included in the Southeast Slovenia Statistical Region.
