= Breška Vas =

- Location in Slovenia
- Coordinates: 45°51′28.94″N 15°16′25.12″E
- Country: Slovenia
- Traditional region: Lower Carniola
- Statistical region: Southeast Slovenia
- Municipality: Šentjernej

Area
  - Total: 0.37 km^{2} (0.14 sq mi)
- Elevation: 175.7 m (576 ft)

Population (2002)
  - Total: 20
- Postal code: 8310

Breška Vas (pronounced [ˈbɾeːʃka ˈʋaːs]; Slovene: Breška vas) is a small settlement on the right bank of the Krka River in the Municipality of Šentjernej in southeastern Slovenia. The area is part of the traditional region of Lower Carniola. It is now included in the Southeast Slovenia Statistical Region.

== Name ==
Breška Vas was attested in written sources as Nabrego in 1251, Stad in 1306, Passagio c. 1306, Gestad in 1392, Furt der verg between 1395 and 1396, and vrfar in 1486, among other spellings. The name Breška vas literally means 'river bank village'; the adjective breška is derived from the Slovene common noun breg 'river bank'.
