= Vratno =

- Location in Slovenia
- Coordinates: 45°48′35.91″N 15°20′42.73″E
- Country: Slovenia
- Traditional region: Lower Carniola
- Statistical region: Southeast Slovenia
- Municipality: Šentjernej

Area
  - Total: 4.17 km^{2} (1.61 sq mi)
- Elevation: 281.3 m (923 ft)

Population (2002)
  - Total: 66
- Postal code: 8310

Vratno (pronounced [ˈwɾaːtnɔ]; German: Thörl) is a settlement in the Žumberak/Gorjanci Hills in the Municipality of Šentjernej in southeastern Slovenia. It is part of the traditional region of Lower Carniola and is now included in the Southeast Slovenia Statistical Region.
