= Gorenja Gomila =

- Location in Slovenia
- Coordinates: 45°51′48.56″N 15°17′19″E
- Country: Slovenia
- Traditional region: Lower Carniola
- Statistical region: Southeast Slovenia
- Municipality: Šentjernej

Area
  - Total: 1.64 km^{2} (0.63 sq mi)
- Elevation: 159.1 m (522 ft)

Population (2002)
  - Total: 62
- Postal code: 8310

Gorenja Gomila (pronounced [ɡɔˈɾeːnja ɡɔˈmiːla]; German: Obergomila) is a settlement on the right bank of the Krka River in the Municipality of Šentjernej in southeastern Slovenia. The area is part of the traditional region of Lower Carniola. It is now included in the Southeast Slovenia Statistical Region.

Trial excavations in 1988 in the hamlet of Golo south of the main settlement confirmed the existence of a Late Bronze Age burial ground at the location. Older literature also refers to Roman graves. The foundations of an 8 m wide Roman road with a possible crossing over the Krka River have also been uncovered in the settlement.
