= Tolsti Vrh, Šentjernej =

Tolsti Vrh
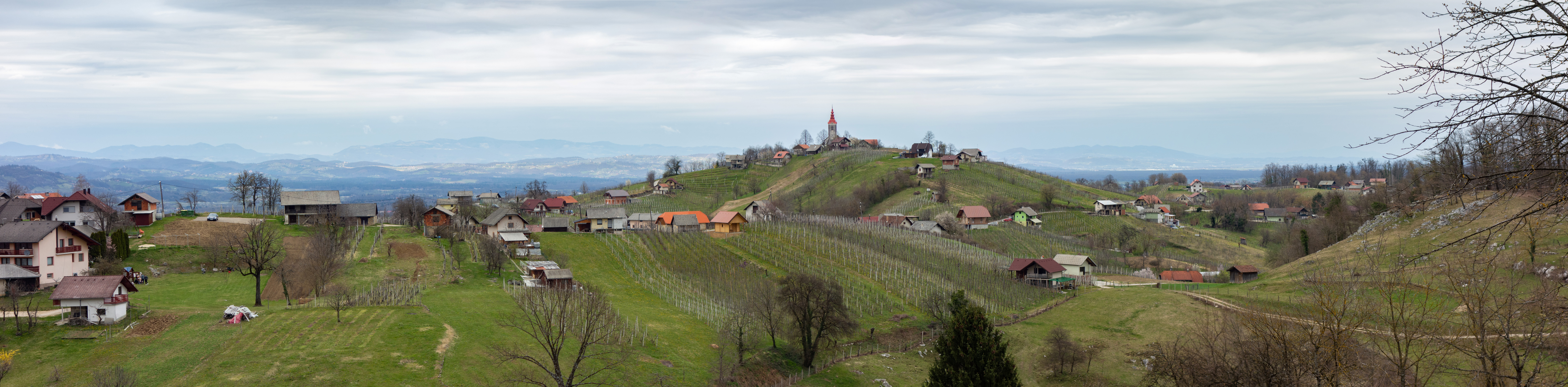
- Tolsti Vrh with Saint Roch's Church

- Location in Slovenia
- Coordinates: 45°48′44.79″N 15°17′22.12″E
- Country: Slovenia
- Traditional region: Lower Carniola
- Statistical region: Southeast Slovenia
- Municipality: Šentjernej

Area
  - Total: 2.34 km^{2} (0.90 sq mi)
- Elevation: 311.9 m (1,023 ft)

Population (2002)
  - Total: 97
- Postal code: 8310

Tolsti Vrh (pronounced [ˈtoːu̯sti ˈʋəɾx]) is a settlement in the foothills of the Žumberak/Gorjanci range in the Municipality of Šentjernej in southeastern Slovenia. It is part of the traditional region of Lower Carniola and is now included in the Southeast Slovenia Statistical Region.

The local church, built on a small hill in the centre of the settlement, is dedicated to Saint Roch (Slovene: sveti Rok). It was a well-known pilgrimage church built in 1713 in gratitude for the ending of a local epidemic of the plague. Its main altar dates to the late 18th century and the side altars are from the 19th century.

On a hill south of the settlement are the remains of a second church. It was a Romanesque building that was abandoned in 1782 and partly demolished in 1808.
