= Javorovica =

- Location in Slovenia
- Coordinates: 45°48′22.49″N 15°21′27.58″E
- Country: Slovenia
- Traditional region: Lower Carniola
- Statistical region: Southeast Slovenia
- Municipality: Šentjernej

Area
  - Total: 8.58 km^{2} (3.31 sq mi)
- Elevation: 549.5 m (1,803 ft)

Population (2002)
  - Total: 38
- Postal code: 8310

Javorovica (pronounced [ˈjaːʋɔɾɔʋitsa]) is a village in the Gorjanci Mountains in the Municipality of Šentjernej in southeastern Slovenia. Its territory extends southwards right to the border with Croatia. The area is part of the traditional region of Lower Carniola. It is now included in the Southeast Slovenia Statistical Region.

== Name ==
Javorovica was attested in historical sources as Yauriz in 1297, Jaworwiz in 1306, Jabrowitz in 1330, and Jagrawicz in 1371, among other spellings. The name is derived from the common noun javor 'maple', referring to the local vegetation.

== Cultural heritage ==
A former chapel dedicated to Saint Oswald has now been converted into a memorial to Partisans that died in the Gorjanci Hills during the Second World War.
