= Dolenje Mokro Polje =

- Location in Slovenia
- Coordinates: 45°50′5.01″N 15°16′36.29″E
- Country: Slovenia
- Traditional region: Lower Carniola
- Statistical region: Southeast Slovenia
- Municipality: Šentjernej

Area
  - Total: 1.71 km^{2} (0.66 sq mi)
- Elevation: 196.8 m (646 ft)

Population (2002)
  - Total: 171
- Postal code: 8310

Dolenje Mokro Polje (pronounced [dɔˈleːnjɛ ˈmɔːkɾɔ ˈpoːljɛ]) is a settlement in the Municipality of Šentjernej in southeastern Slovenia. The area is part of the traditional region of Lower Carniola. It is now included in the Southeast Slovenia Statistical Region. The village was first mentioned in 1227 as Unter Nassenfeld (literally, 'lower wet field'). Due to flooding, the villagers began to settle at a nearby location, where it still stands. Only a few ruins have survived at the old location. According to the 2003 census, there are 36 houses in the village. Villagers attend Saint Sigismund's Church in the neighboring village of Polhovica.
