= Mali Ban =

- Location in Slovenia
- Coordinates: 45°49′24.29″N 15°21′49.75″E
- Country: Slovenia
- Traditional region: Lower Carniola
- Statistical region: Southeast Slovenia
- Municipality: Šentjernej

Area
  - Total: 0.53 km^{2} (0.20 sq mi)
- Elevation: 290.3 m (952 ft)

Population (2002)
  - Total: 25
- Postal code: 8310

Mali Ban (pronounced [ˈmaːli ˈbaːn], German: Kleinban) is a small settlement in the foothills of the Gorjanci Mountains in the Municipality of Šentjernej in southeastern Slovenia. The area is part of the traditional region of Lower Carniola. It is now included in the Southeast Slovenia Statistical Region.
