= Hrvaški Brod =

- Location in Slovenia
- Coordinates: 45°52′32.29″N 15°21′10.64″E
- Country: Slovenia
- Traditional region: Lower Carniola
- Statistical region: Southeast Slovenia
- Municipality: Šentjernej

Area
  - Total: 1.03 km^{2} (0.40 sq mi)
- Elevation: 153.1 m (502 ft)

Population (2002)
  - Total: 72
- Postal code: 8310

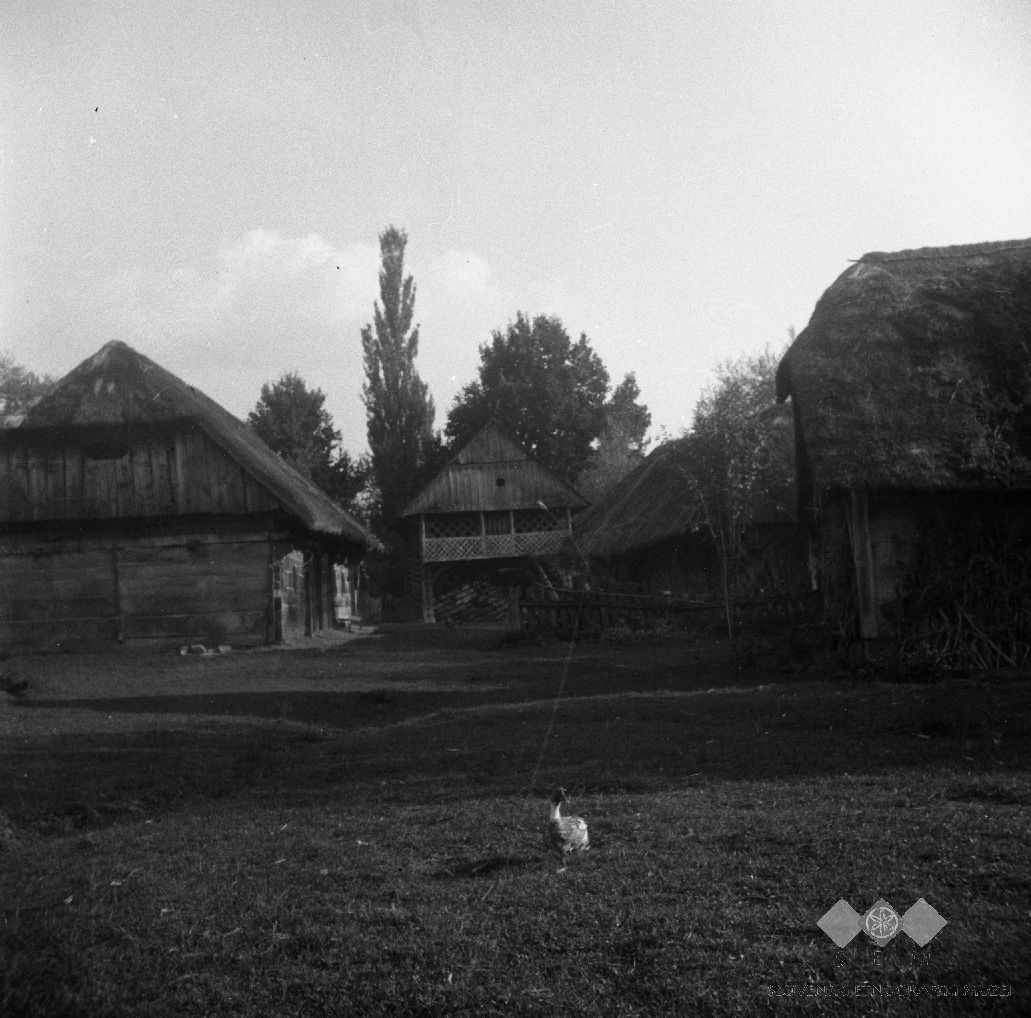
Buildings in Hrvaški Brod (1952)

Hrvaški Brod (pronounced [xəɾˈʋaːʃki ˈbɾoːt]) (Croatian Ford) is a village on the left bank of the Krka River in the Municipality of Šentjernej in southeastern Slovenia. The area is part of the traditional region of Lower Carniola. It is now included in the Southeast Slovenia Statistical Region. Its name literally means 'Croatian ford'.
