= Municipality of Šentjernej =

Municipality of Slovenia

Municipality of Šentjernej Občina Šentjernej
- Municipality
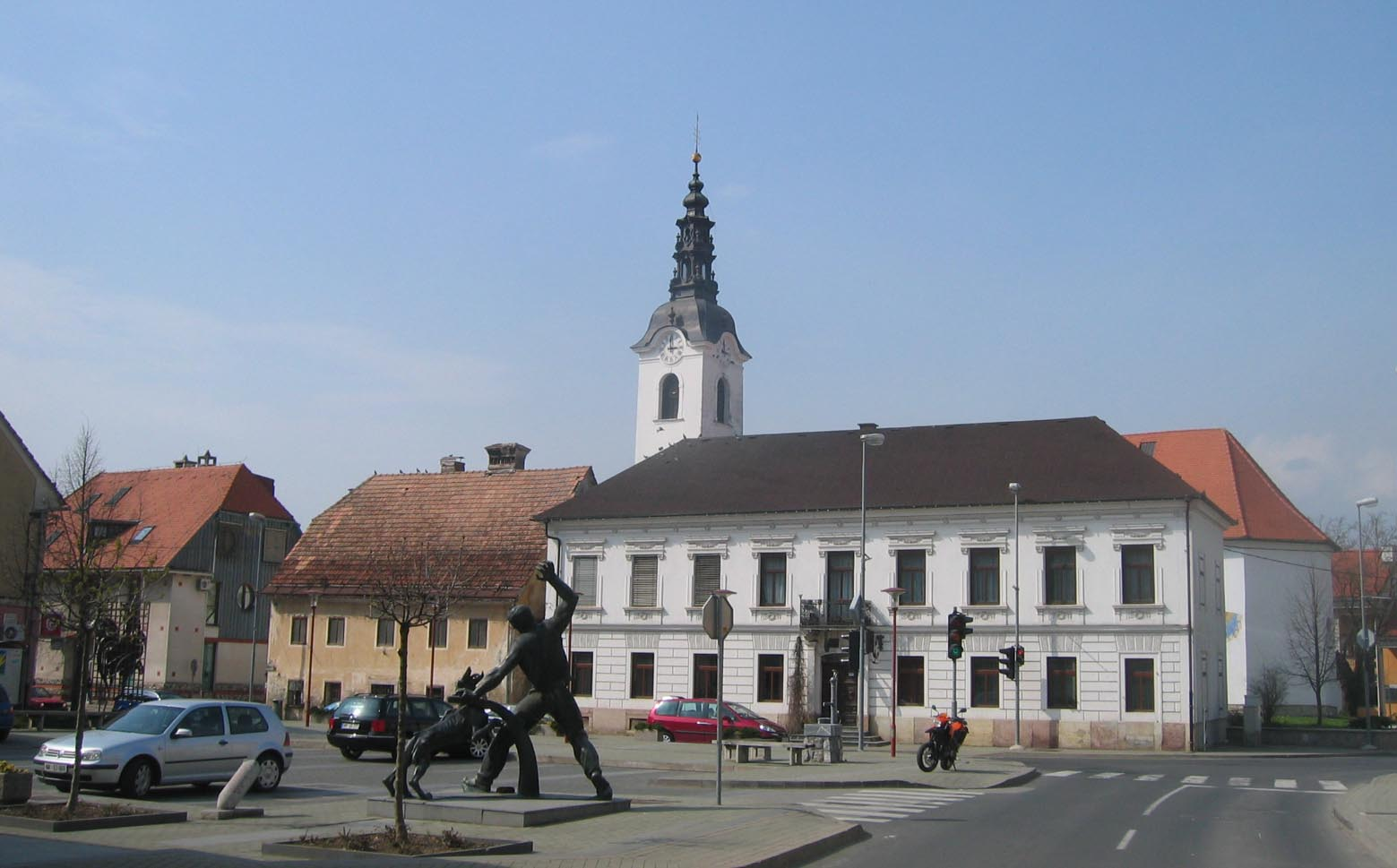

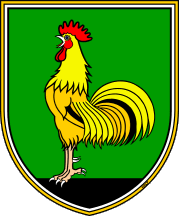
- Coat of arms

- Location of the Municipality of Šentjernej in Slovenia
- Coordinates: 45°49′N 15°20′E
- Country: Slovenia

Government
  - Mayor: Jože Simončič

Area
  - Total: 96.0 km^{2} (37.1 sq mi)

Population (July 1, 2018)
  - Total: 7,107
  - Density: 74.0/km^{2} (192/sq mi)
- Time zone: UTC+01 (CET)
  - Summer (DST): UTC+02 (CEST)
- Website: www.sentjernej.si

The Municipality of Šentjernej (pronounced [ʃɛnˈtjɛːɾnɛi̯] or [ʃənˈtjɛːɾnɛi̯]; Slovene: Občina Šentjernej) is a municipality in the traditional region of Lower Carniola in southeastern Slovenia. The seat of the municipality is the town of Šentjernej. Šentjernej became a municipality in 1994 (32 years ago). It borders Croatia.

== Settlements ==
In addition to the municipal seat of Šentjernej, the municipality also includes the following settlements:

- Apnenik
- Breška Vas
- Brezje pri Šentjerneju
- Čadraže
- Cerov Log
- Čisti Breg
- Dobravica
- Dolenja Brezovica
- Dolenja Stara Vas
- Dolenje Gradišče pri Šentjerneju
- Dolenje Mokro Polje
- Dolenje Vrhpolje
- Dolenji Maharovec
- Drama
- Drča
- Gorenja Brezovica
- Gorenja Gomila
- Gorenja Stara Vas
- Gorenje Gradišče pri Šentjerneju
- Gorenje Mokro Polje
- Gorenje Vrhpolje
- Gorenji Maharovec
- Groblje pri Prekopi
- Gruča
- Hrastje
- Hrvaški Brod
- Imenje
- Javorovica
- Ledeča Vas
- Loka
- Mali Ban
- Mihovica
- Mihovo
- Mršeča Vas
- Orehovica
- Ostrog
- Polhovica
- Prapreče pri Šentjerneju
- Pristava pri Šentjerneju
- Pristavica
- Rakovnik
- Razdrto
- Roje
- Sela pri Šentjerneju
- Šentjakob
- Šmalčja Vas
- Šmarje
- Tolsti Vrh
- Veliki Ban
- Volčkova Vas
- Vratno
- Vrbovice
- Vrh pri Šentjerneju
- Zameško
- Zapuže
- Žerjavin
- Žvabovo
