= Dobravica, Šentjernej =

Dobravica
- Location in Slovenia
- Coordinates: 45°50′36.65″N 15°19′20.98″E
- Country: Slovenia
- Traditional region: Lower Carniola
- Statistical region: Southeast Slovenia
- Municipality: Šentjernej

Area
  - Total: 0.78 km^{2} (0.30 sq mi)
- Elevation: 185.4 m (608 ft)

Population (2002)
  - Total: 158
- Postal code: 8310

Dobravica (pronounced [dɔˈbɾaːʋitsa]) is a settlement immediately west of the town of Šentjernej in southeastern Slovenia. The area is part of the traditional region of Lower Carniola. It is now included in the Southeast Slovenia Statistical Region.
