= Dolenja Brezovica, Šentjernej =

Dolenja Brezovica
- Location in Slovenia
- Coordinates: 45°49′53.04″N 15°20′28.39″E
- Country: Slovenia
- Traditional region: Lower Carniola
- Statistical region: Southeast Slovenia
- Municipality: Šentjernej

Area
  - Total: 0.66 km^{2} (0.25 sq mi)
- Elevation: 208 m (682 ft)

Population (2002)
  - Total: 149
- Postal code: 8310

Dolenja Brezovica (pronounced [dɔˈlèːnja ˈbɾéːzɔʋitsa]; German: Unterbresowiz) is a settlement immediately to the south of Šentjernej in southeastern Slovenia. The area is part of the traditional region of Lower Carniola. It is now included in the Southeast Slovenia Statistical Region.
