= Mihovica =

- Location in Slovenia
- Coordinates: 45°51′26.76″N 15°19′54.66″E
- Country: Slovenia
- Traditional region: Lower Carniola
- Statistical region: Southeast Slovenia
- Municipality: Šentjernej

Area
  - Total: 2.29 km^{2} (0.88 sq mi)
- Elevation: 164.1 m (538 ft)

Population (2002)
  - Total: 130
- Postal code: 8310

Mihovica (pronounced [ˈmiːxɔʋitsa]) is a settlement on the right bank of the Krka River in the Municipality of Šentjernej in southeastern Slovenia. Traditional 19th-century farmhouses and outbuildings are preserved in the village core and it has been included on the Slovenian Ministry of Culture's register of national heritage. The area is part of the traditional region of Lower Carniola. It is now included in the Southeast Slovenia Statistical Region.
