= Brezje pri Šentjerneju =

- Location in Slovenia
- Coordinates: 45°50′30.71″N 15°21′44.63″E
- Country: Slovenia
- Traditional region: Lower Carniola
- Statistical region: Southeast Slovenia
- Municipality: Šentjernej

Area
  - Total: 0.96 km^{2} (0.37 sq mi)
- Elevation: 188.4 m (618 ft)

Population (2002)
  - Total: 48
- Postal code: 8310

Brezje pri Šentjerneju (pronounced [ˈbɾeːzjɛ pɾi ʃɛntjɛɾˈnɛːju]) is a small village at the foothills of the Gorjanci range in the Municipality of Šentjernej in southeastern Slovenia. The area is part of the traditional region of Lower Carniola and is now included in the Southeast Slovenia Statistical Region.

== Name ==
Brezje pri Šentjerneju was attested in written sources as Pirkch in 1444 and Pirk in 1447. The name of the settlement was changed from Brezje to Brezje pri Šentjerneju in 1953.
