= Dolenji Maharovec =

- Location in Slovenia
- Coordinates: 45°50′48.19″N 15°18′7.82″E
- Country: Slovenia
- Traditional region: Lower Carniola
- Statistical region: Southeast Slovenija
- Municipality: Šentjernej

Area
  - Total: 1.56 km^{2} (0.60 sq mi)
- Elevation: 174 m (571 ft)

Population (2002)
  - Total: 109
- Postal code: 8310

Dolenji Maharovec (pronounced [dɔˈleːnji maxaˈɾɔːʋəts] or [dɔˈleːnji maxaˈɾoːʋəts]; German: Untermacharouz) is a village in the Municipality of Šentjernej in southeastern Slovenia. The area is part of the traditional region of Lower Carniola. It is now included in the Southeast Slovenia Statistical Region.

There are a number of Early Iron Age tumuli in the woods to the east of the settlement.
