= Gorenja Brezovica, Šentjernej =

Gorenja Brezovica
- Location in Slovenia
- Coordinates: 45°50′14.67″N 15°19′4.17″E
- Country: Slovenia
- Traditional region: Lower Carniola
- Statistical region: Southeast Slovenia
- Municipality: Šentjernej

Area
  - Total: 1.56 km^{2} (0.60 sq mi)
- Elevation: 212.4 m (697 ft)

Population (2002)
  - Total: 226
- Postal code: 8310

Gorenja Brezovica (pronounced [ɡɔˈɾèːnja ˈbɾéːzɔʋitsa]; German: Oberbresowiz) is a settlement west of Šentjernej in southeastern Slovenia. The area is part of the traditional region of Lower Carniola. It is now included in the Southeast Slovenia Statistical Region.
