= Prapreče pri Šentjerneju =

- Location in Slovenia
- Coordinates: 45°51′2.29″N 15°16′58.36″E
- Country: Slovenia
- Traditional region: Lower Carniola
- Statistical region: Southeast Slovenia
- Municipality: Šentjernej

Area
  - Total: 1.51 km^{2} (0.58 sq mi)
- Elevation: 178.2 m (585 ft)

Population (2002)
  - Total: 50
- Postal code: 8310

Prapreče pri Šentjerneju (pronounced [ˈpɾaːpɾɛtʃɛ pɾi ʃɛntjɛɾˈnɛːju]; German: Prapretsche) is a settlement in the Municipality of Šentjernej in southeastern Slovenia. The entire municipality is part of the traditional region of Lower Carniola. It is now included in the Southeast Slovenia Statistical Region. It includes the hamlet of Gmajnica (German: Gmainza).

== Geography ==
Prapreče pri Šentjerneju is a clustered village on the edge of a terrace about 10 m above a broad stream valley. The soil is mostly loamy. Tilled fields surround the settlement and have local names: V ograji (literally, 'in the enclosure' to the northwest), Cerkvišče (literally, 'churchyard' to the northeast), Laz (literally, 'clearing' to the east, where there are also meadows), Široke njive (literally, 'broad fields' to the south), and Hrib (literally 'hill' to the west). The slopes of the terrace are planted with grapes and there is mixed woodland to the west.

== Name ==
The village was first recorded as Praprotschach in 1304 (and as Probeszech in 1392 and Praprasach in 1423). The name is derived from the Slovene common noun praprot 'fern' and, like similar names (e.g., Praproče, Praprotno Brdo, Paprače = German: Farrendorf), originally referred to the local vegetation. The village was known as Prapretsche in German in the past. The name of the settlement was changed from Prapreče to Prapreče pri Šentjerneju in 1953.

== History ==
The village was first mentioned in written sources in 1304, when the Sicherstein family transferred the manor and ten farms there into the feudal possession of a certain Martin and his wife. The village later came under the control of the Counts of Celje and then the Prince-Bishopric of Freising. In 1423, two brothers named Freichawer from Vrhovo are recorded as operating two mills in Prapreče belonging to the Prince-Bishopric of Freising. In modern history, the surname Vrtačič is particularly common in the village.

== Cultural heritage ==
Archaeological finds at two sites close to the village have shown Late Iron Age and Roman-era occupation.
