= Orehovica, Šentjernej =

Orehovica
- Location in Slovenia
- Coordinates: 45°48′58.02″N 15°18′20.65″E
- Country: Slovenia
- Traditional region: Lower Carniola
- Statistical region: Southeast Slovenia
- Municipality: Šentjernej

Area
  - Total: 1.39 km^{2} (0.54 sq mi)
- Elevation: 221.1 m (725 ft)

Population (2002)
  - Total: 210
- Postal code: 8310

Orehovica (pronounced [ɔˈɾeːxɔʋitsa]) is a village southwest of Šentjernej in southeastern Slovenia. The area is part of the traditional region of Lower Carniola. It is now included in the Southeast Slovenia Statistical Region.

The local church, built on the southeastern outskirts of the settlement, is dedicated to Saint George and belongs to the Parish of Šentjernej. It is mentioned in written documents dating to 1415, but the current Baroque building dates to 1788.
