= Veliki Ban =

- Location in Slovenia
- Coordinates: 45°49′14.16″N 15°22′17.02″E
- Country: Slovenia
- Traditional region: Lower Carniola
- Statistical region: Southeast Slovenia
- Municipality: Šentjernej

Area
  - Total: 3.29 km^{2} (1.27 sq mi)
- Elevation: 407.9 m (1,338 ft)

Population (2002)
  - Total: 61
- Postal code: 8310

Veliki Ban (pronounced [ˈʋeːliki ˈbaːn], German: Grossban) is a settlement in the Gorjanci Mountains in the Municipality of Šentjernej in southeastern Slovenia. To the south its territory extends right to the border with Croatia. It is part of the traditional region of Lower Carniola and is now included in the Southeast Slovenia Statistical Region.
