= Gorenja Stara Vas =

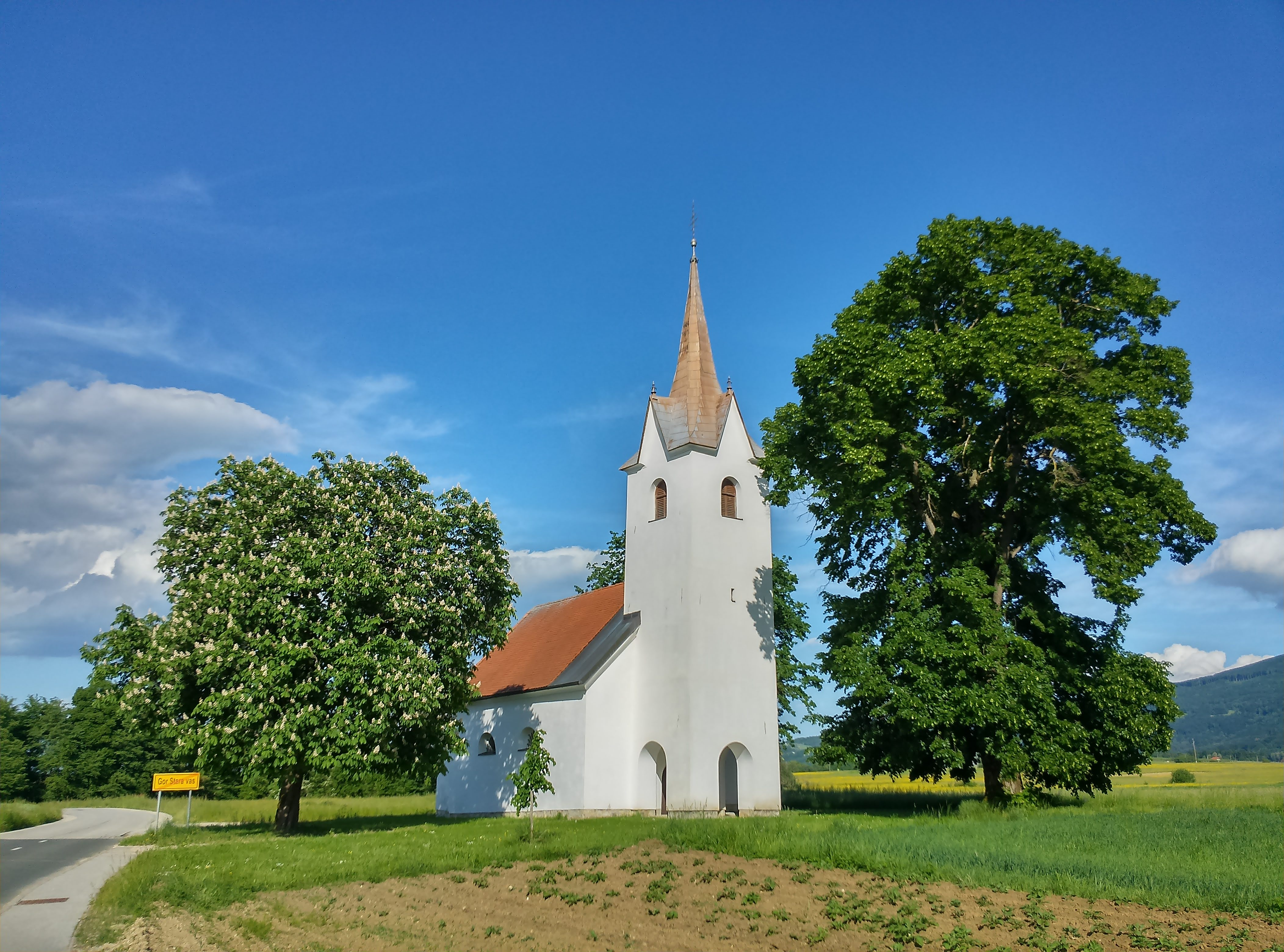
- Saint Thomas's Church

- Location in Slovenia
- Coordinates: 45°49′22.92″N 15°18′34.23″E
- Country: Slovenia
- Traditional region: Lower Carniola
- Statistical region: Southeast Slovenia
- Municipality: Šentjernej

Area
  - Total: 0.91 km^{2} (0.35 sq mi)
- Elevation: 215.1 m (706 ft)

Population (2002)
  - Total: 92
- Postal code: 8310

Gorenja Stara Vas (pronounced [ɡɔˈɾeːnja ˈstaːɾa ˈʋaːs]; Slovene: Gorenja Stara vas) is a village in the Municipality of Šentjernej in southeastern Slovenia. The area is part of the traditional region of Lower Carniola. It is now included in the Southeast Slovenia Statistical Region.

The local church, built on the northeastern outskirts of the village, is dedicated to Saint Thomas (Slovene: sveti Tomaž) and belongs to the Parish of Šentjernej. It is a medieval structure that was greatly rebuilt in the Baroque style in the early 18th century.
