= Praproče, Dobrova–Polhov Gradec =

Praproče
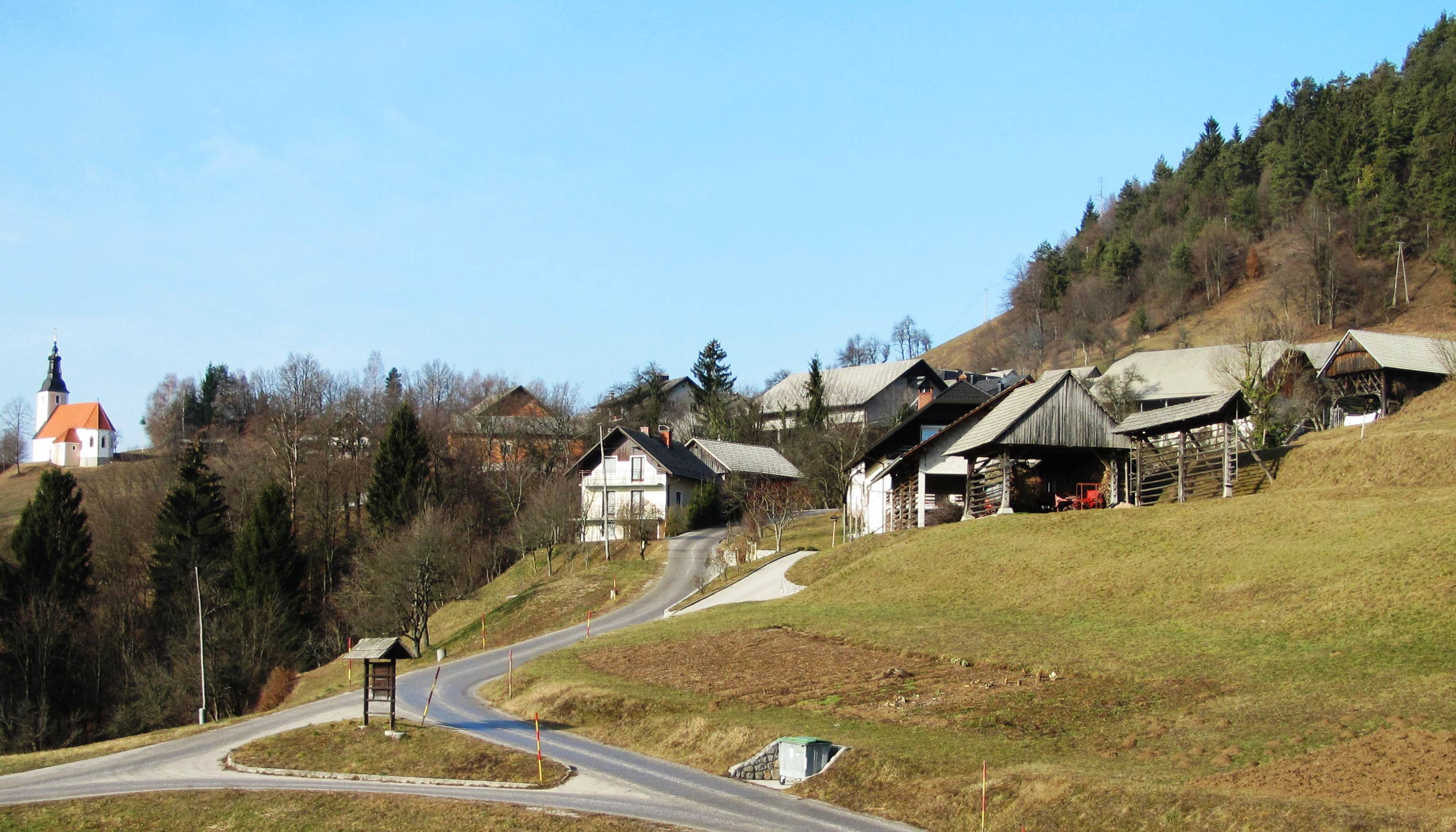

- Location in Slovenia
- Coordinates: 46°3′41.45″N 14°17′27.8″E
- Country: Slovenia
- Traditional region: Upper Carniola
- Statistical region: Central Slovenia
- Municipality: Dobrova–Polhov Gradec

Area
  - Total: 1.71 km^{2} (0.66 sq mi)
- Elevation: 540.3 m (1,773 ft)

Population (2020)
  - Total: 100
  - Density: 58/km^{2} (150/sq mi)

Praproče (pronounced [ˈpɾaːpɾɔtʃɛ]) is a small village west of Polhov Gradec in the Municipality of Dobrova–Polhov Gradec in the Upper Carniola region of Slovenia. It includes part of the hamlet of Zalog northwest of the main settlement, in the valley of Big Božna Creek.

== Name ==
The name Praproče is derived from the Slovene word praprot 'fern' and, like similar names (e.g., Parpreče, Praprotno Brdo, and Paprače = German: Farrendorf), it originally referred to the local vegetation. In the past it was known as Prapretsche in German.

== Church ==
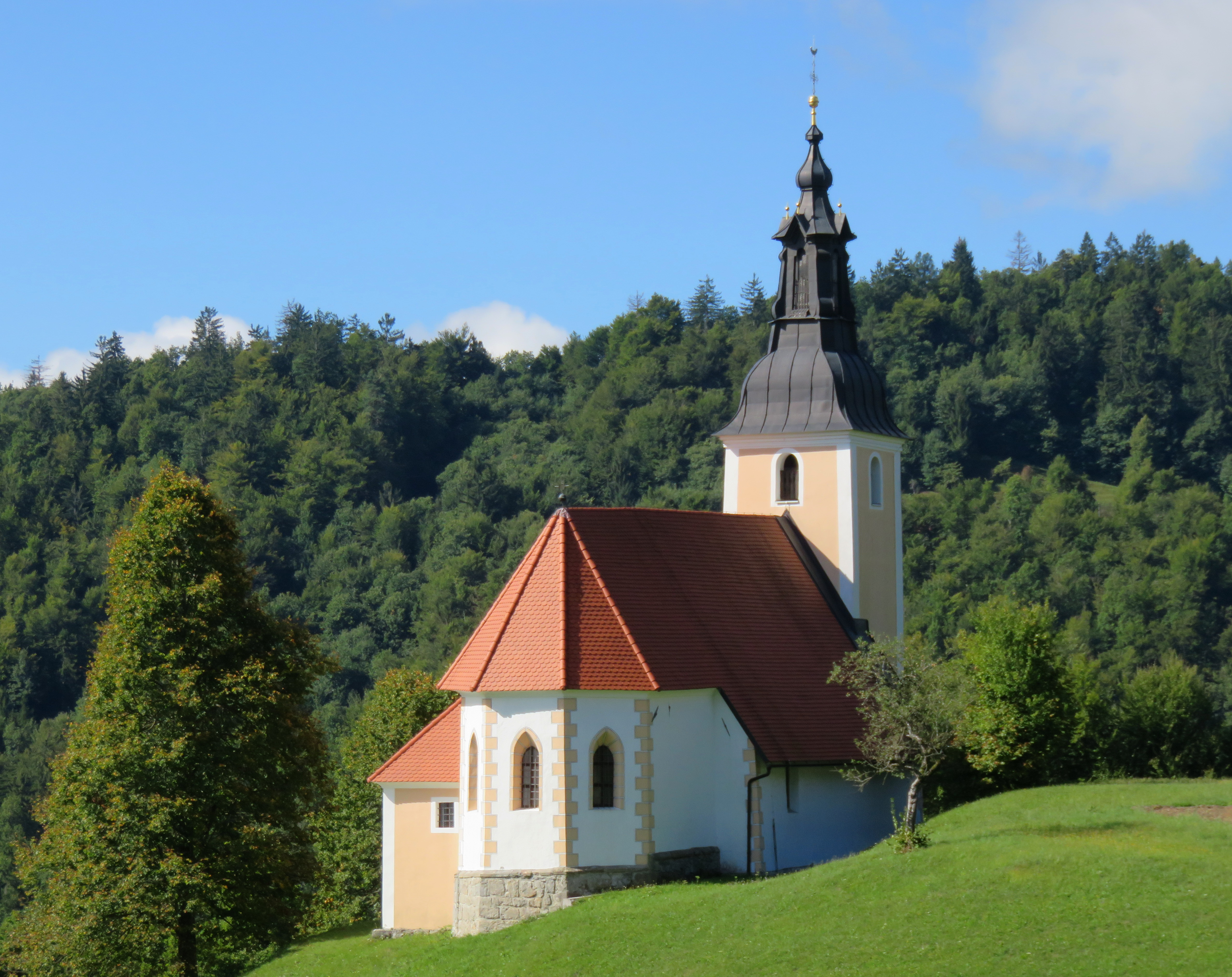
St. George's Church

The local church is dedicated to Saint George and was first mentioned in documents dating to 1526. The current building was built in 1635 and has an interesting flat wooden painted ceiling.

== Gallery ==
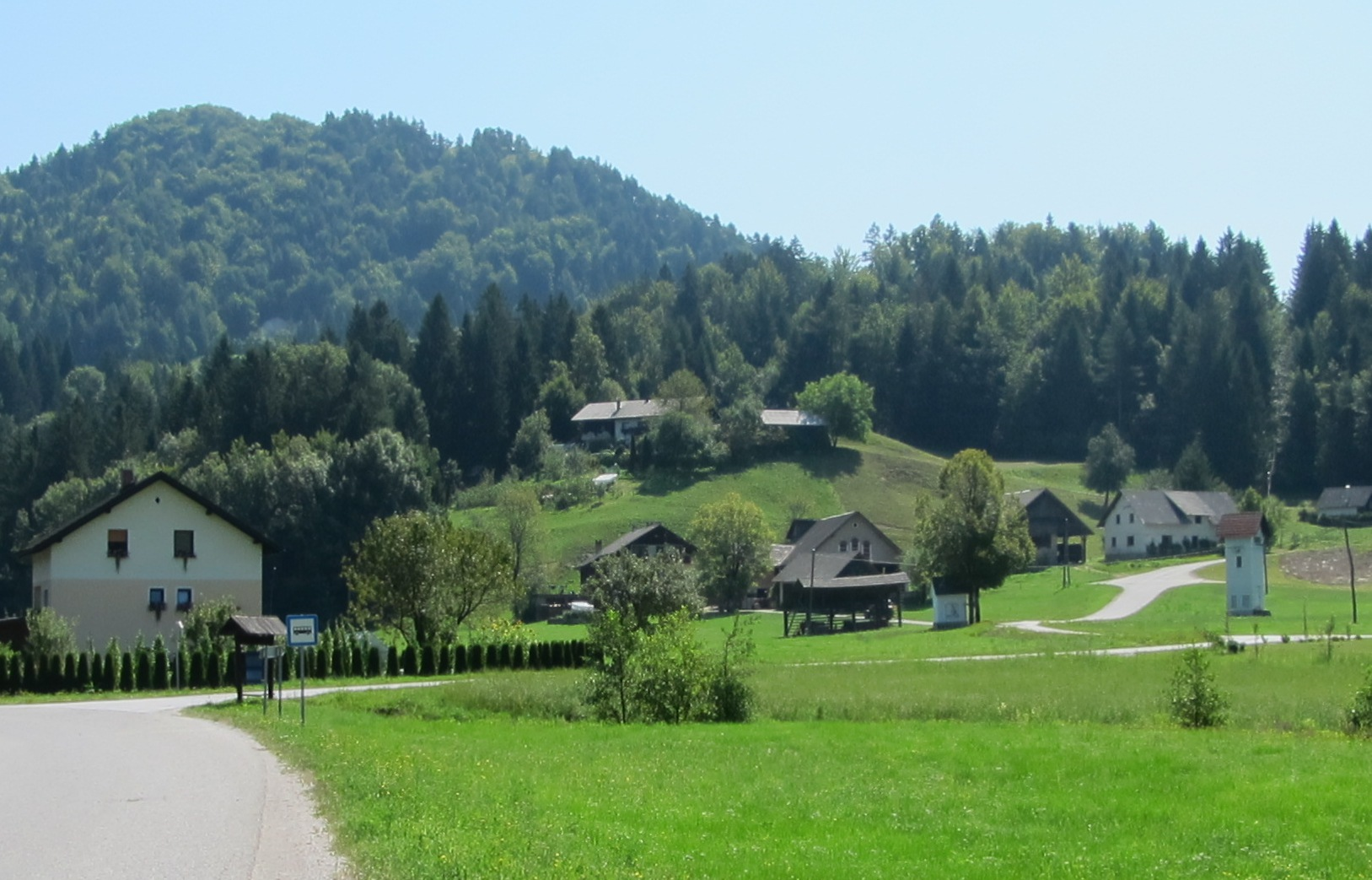
The hamlet of Zalog

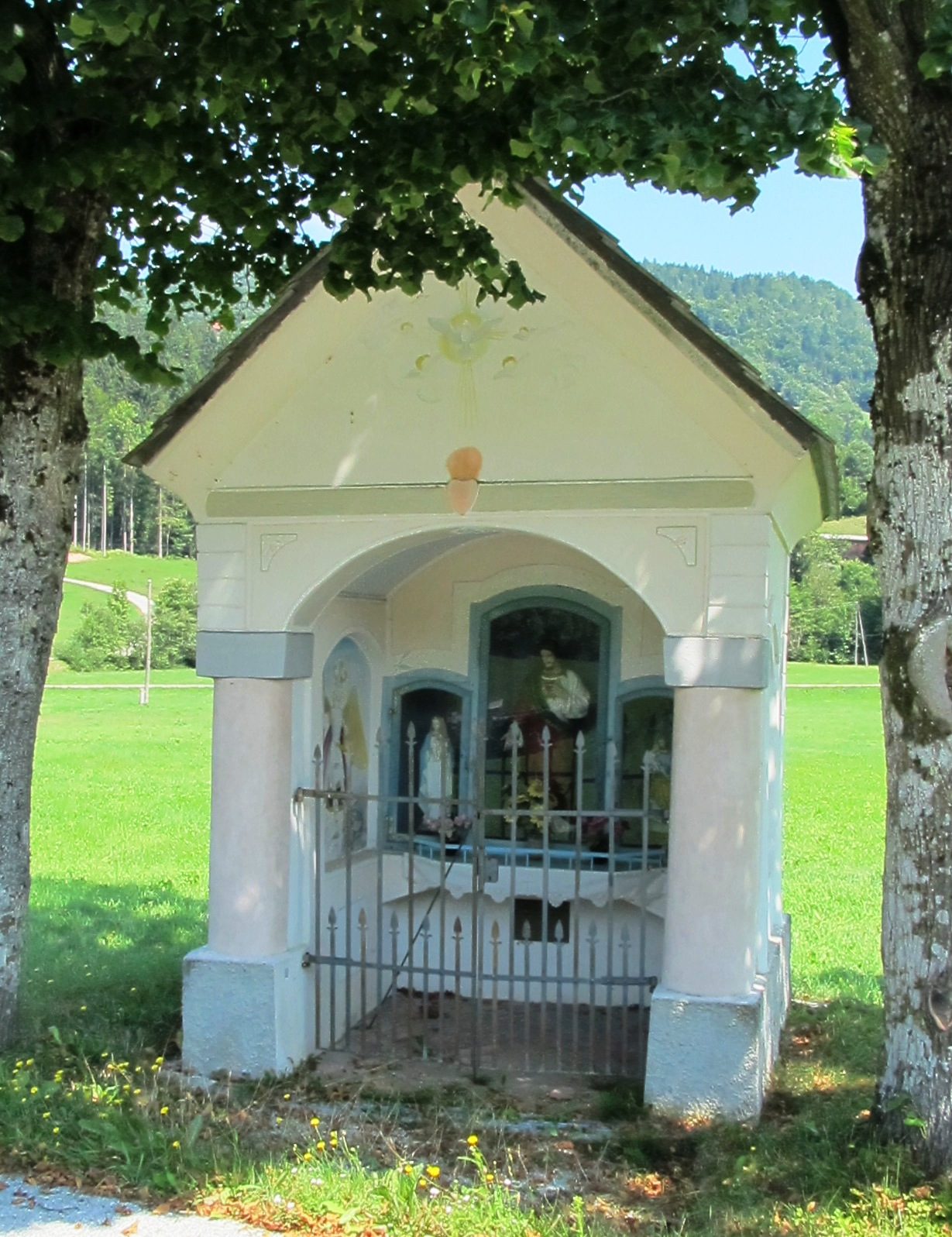
Chapel-shrine in the hamlet of Zalog
