= Pristava pri Šentjerneju =

- Location in Slovenia
- Coordinates: 45°49′35.43″N 15°17′19.7″E
- Country: Slovenia
- Traditional region: Lower Carniola
- Statistical region: Southeast Slovenia
- Municipality: Šentjernej

Area
  - Total: 1.76 km^{2} (0.68 sq mi)
- Elevation: 196 m (643 ft)

Population (2002)
  - Total: 50
- Postal code: 8310

Pristava pri Šentjerneju (pronounced [pɾiˈstaːʋa pɾi ʃɛntjɛɾˈnɛːju]) is a settlement in the Municipality of Šentjernej in southeastern Slovenia. The entire municipality is part of the traditional region of Lower Carniola. It is now included in the Southeast Slovenia Statistical Region.

== Name ==
The name of the settlement was changed from Pristava to Pristava pri Šentjerneju in 1953.
