= Gorenje Gradišče pri Šentjerneju =

- Location in Slovenia
- Coordinates: 45°50′29.51″N 15°17′25.08″E
- Country: Slovenia
- Traditional region: Lower Carniola
- Statistical region: Southeast Slovenia
- Municipality: Šentjernej

Area
  - Total: 1.02 km^{2} (0.39 sq mi)
- Elevation: 172.9 m (567 ft)

Population (2002)
  - Total: 93
- Postal code: 8310

Gorenje Gradišče pri Šentjerneju (pronounced [ɡɔˈɾeːnjɛ ɡɾaˈdiːʃtʃɛ pɾi ʃɛntjɛɾˈnɛːju]; German: Obergradische) is a settlement west of Šentjernej in southeastern Slovenia. The area is part of the traditional region of Lower Carniola. It is now included in the Southeast Slovenia Statistical Region.

== Name ==
The name of the settlement was changed from Gorenje Gradišče to Gorenje Gradišče pri Šentjerneju in 1953. In the past the German name was Obergradische.

== Church ==
The local church, built outside the settlement to the east, is dedicated to Saints Cosmas and Damian and belongs to the Parish of Šentjernej. It was first mentioned in written documents dating to 1526, but the current Baroque building dates to the early 17th century.
