= Polhovica =

- Location in Slovenia
- Coordinates: 45°50′28.65″N 15°16′41.04″E
- Country: Slovenia
- Traditional region: Lower Carniola
- Statistical region: Southeast Slovenia
- Municipality: Šentjernej

Area
  - Total: 2.18 km^{2} (0.84 sq mi)
- Elevation: 190.4 m (625 ft)

Population (2002)
  - Total: 42
- Postal code: 8310

Polhovica (pronounced [ˈpou̯ːxɔʋitsa]) is a village in the Municipality of Šentjernej in southeastern Slovenia. Its territory extends to the woods west of the main settlement up to the banks of the Krka River. The entire municipality is part of the traditional region of Lower Carniola. It is now included in the Southeast Slovenia Statistical Region.

== Church ==
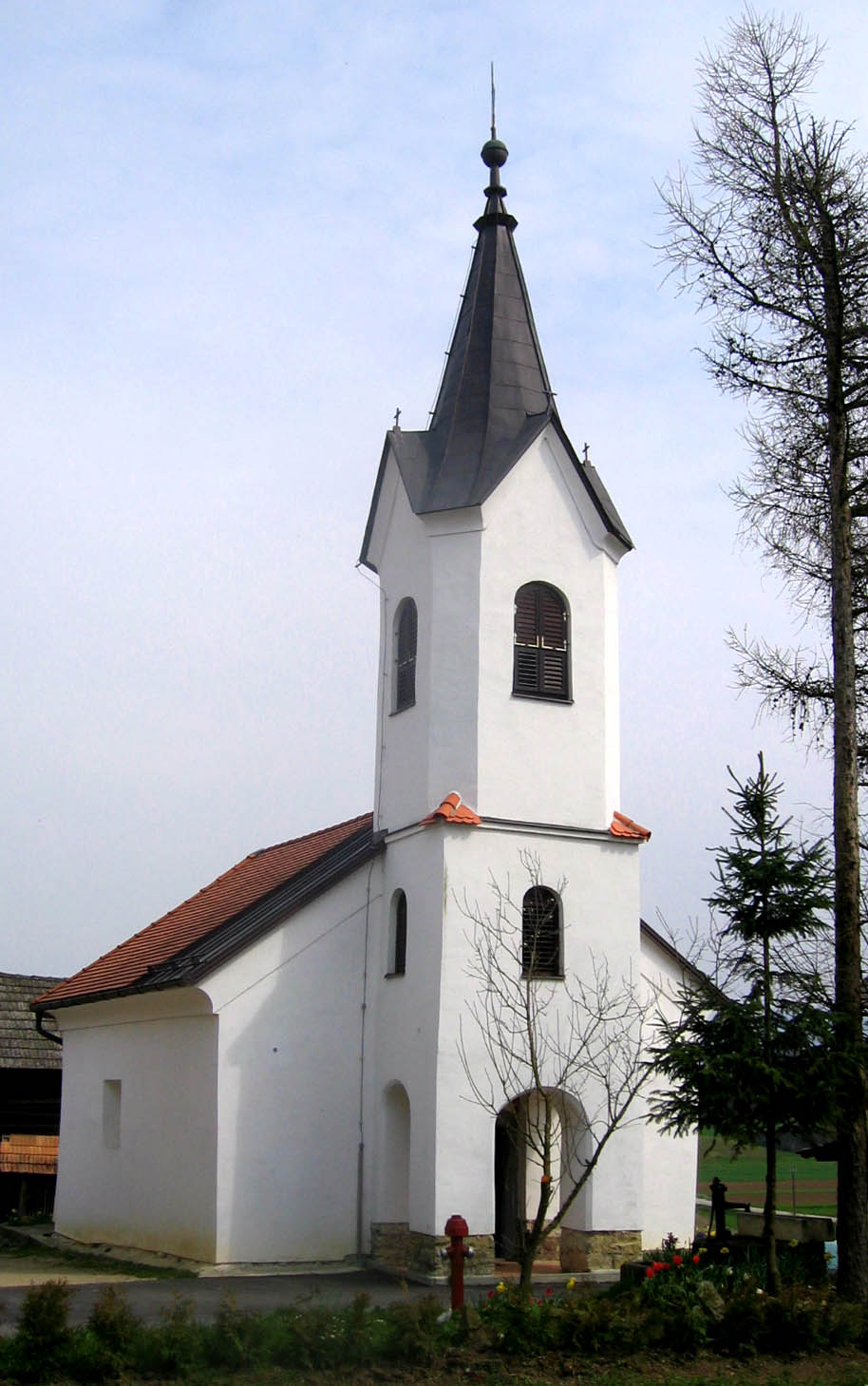
St. Sigismund's Church in Polhovica

The local church, built on a slight elevation in the centre of the village, is dedicated to Saint Sigismund (Slovene: sveti Žiga) and belongs to the parish of Šentjernej. In written documents dating to the 17th century it is mentioned as a Romanesque building that had been recently renovated. The main and the only altar dates to the 19th century. The church was thoroughly renovated from 1998 until 2002.
