= Pristavica pri Velikem Gabru =

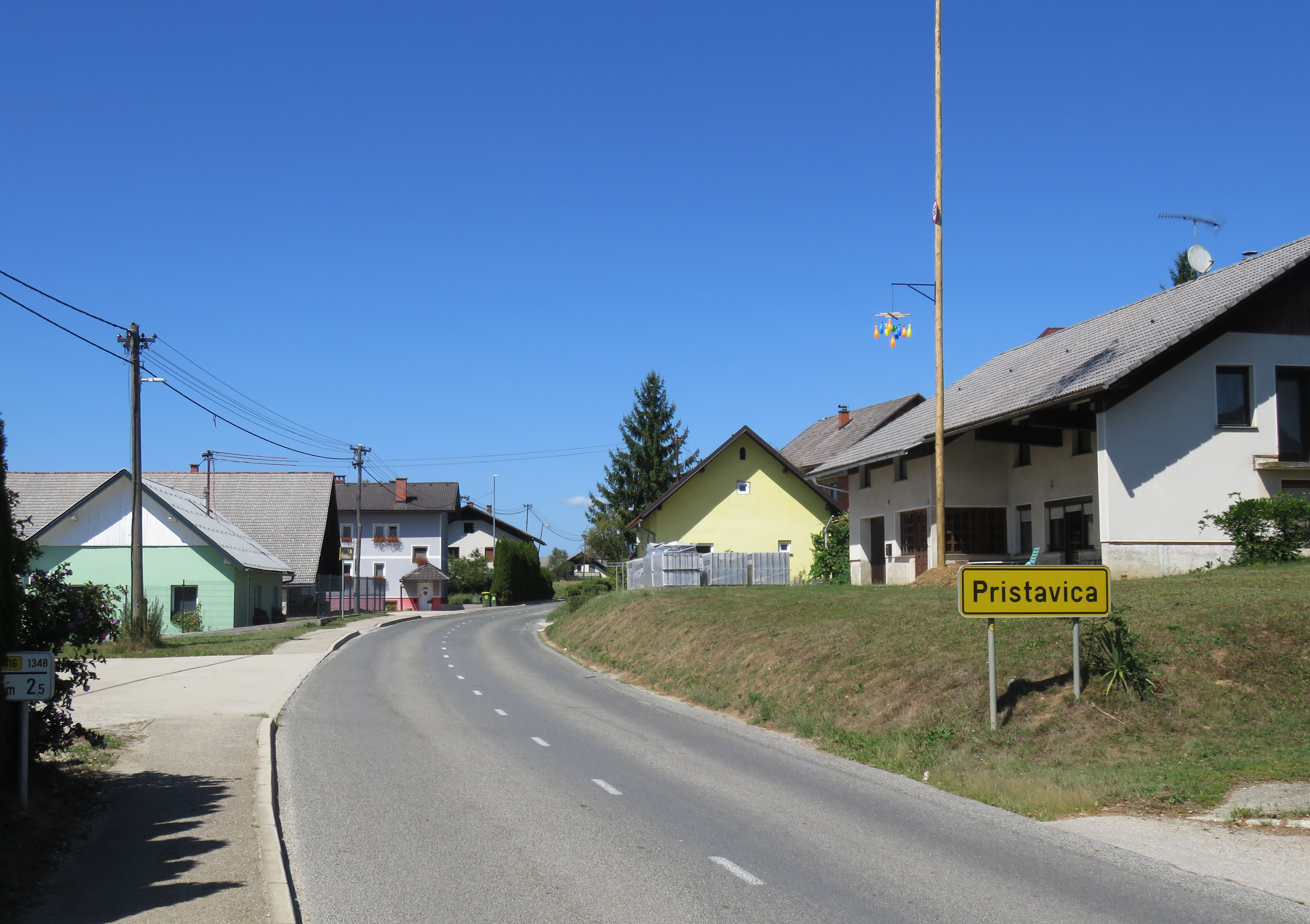

- Location in Slovenia
- Coordinates: 45°55′35.78″N 14°52′53.86″E
- Country: Slovenia
- Traditional region: Lower Carniola
- Statistical region: Southeast Slovenia
- Municipality: Trebnje

Area
  - Total: 0.42 km^{2} (0.16 sq mi)
- Elevation: 307 m (1,007 ft)

Population (2002)
  - Total: 95

Pristavica pri Velikem Gabru (pronounced [pɾiˈstaːʋitsa pɾi ˈʋeːlikɛm ˈɡaːbɾu]) is a small settlement west of Bič in the Municipality of Trebnje in eastern Slovenia. The A2 Slovenian motorway runs along the southern edge of the settlement. The area is part of the historical region of Lower Carniola. The municipality is now included in the Southeast Slovenia Statistical Region.

== Name ==
The name of the settlement was changed from Pristavica to Pristavica pri Velikem Gabru in 1953.
