= Cerov Log =

- Location in Slovenia
- Coordinates: 45°48′22.61″N 15°18′55.2″E
- Country: Slovenia
- Traditional region: Lower Carniola
- Statistical region: Southeast Slovenia
- Municipality: Šentjernej

Area
  - Total: 11.35 km^{2} (4.38 sq mi)
- Elevation: 254.2 m (834 ft)

Population (2002)
  - Total: 205
- Postal code: 8310

Cerov Log (pronounced [ˈtseːɾou̯ ˈloːk]) is a small settlement in the Gorjanci Mountains in the Municipality of Šentjernej in southeastern Slovenia. Its territory extends right to the border with Croatia. The area is part of the traditional region of Lower Carniola. It is now included in the Southeast Slovenia Statistical Region.

There is a 16th-century three-storey mansion south of the settlement known as Prežek Castle. In the 1830s it was owned for a while by Andrej Smole, a collector of Slovene folk songs and friend of the poet France Prešeren.
