= Rakovnik, Šentjernej =

Rakovnik
- Location in Slovenia
- Coordinates: 45°49′42.95″N 15°22′28.33″E
- Country: Slovenia
- Traditional region: Lower Carniola
- Statistical region: Southeast Slovenia
- Municipality: Šentjernej

Area
  - Total: 0.28 km^{2} (0.11 sq mi)
- Elevation: 281.2 m (923 ft)

Population (2002)
  - Total: 10
- Postal code: 8310

Rakovnik (pronounced [ˈɾaːkɔu̯nik]) is a small settlement in the Municipality of Šentjernej in southeastern Slovenia. It lies in the foothills of the Gorjanci range. The entire municipality is part of the traditional region of Lower Carniola. It is now included in the Southeast Slovenia Statistical Region.

There is a small church in the forest south of the settlement. It is dedicated to Our Lady of Lourdes with a statue of Mary placed in a niche carved into the rockface and a building erected in front of it. It dates to the early 20th century.
