= Prapreče, Žužemberk =

Prapreče
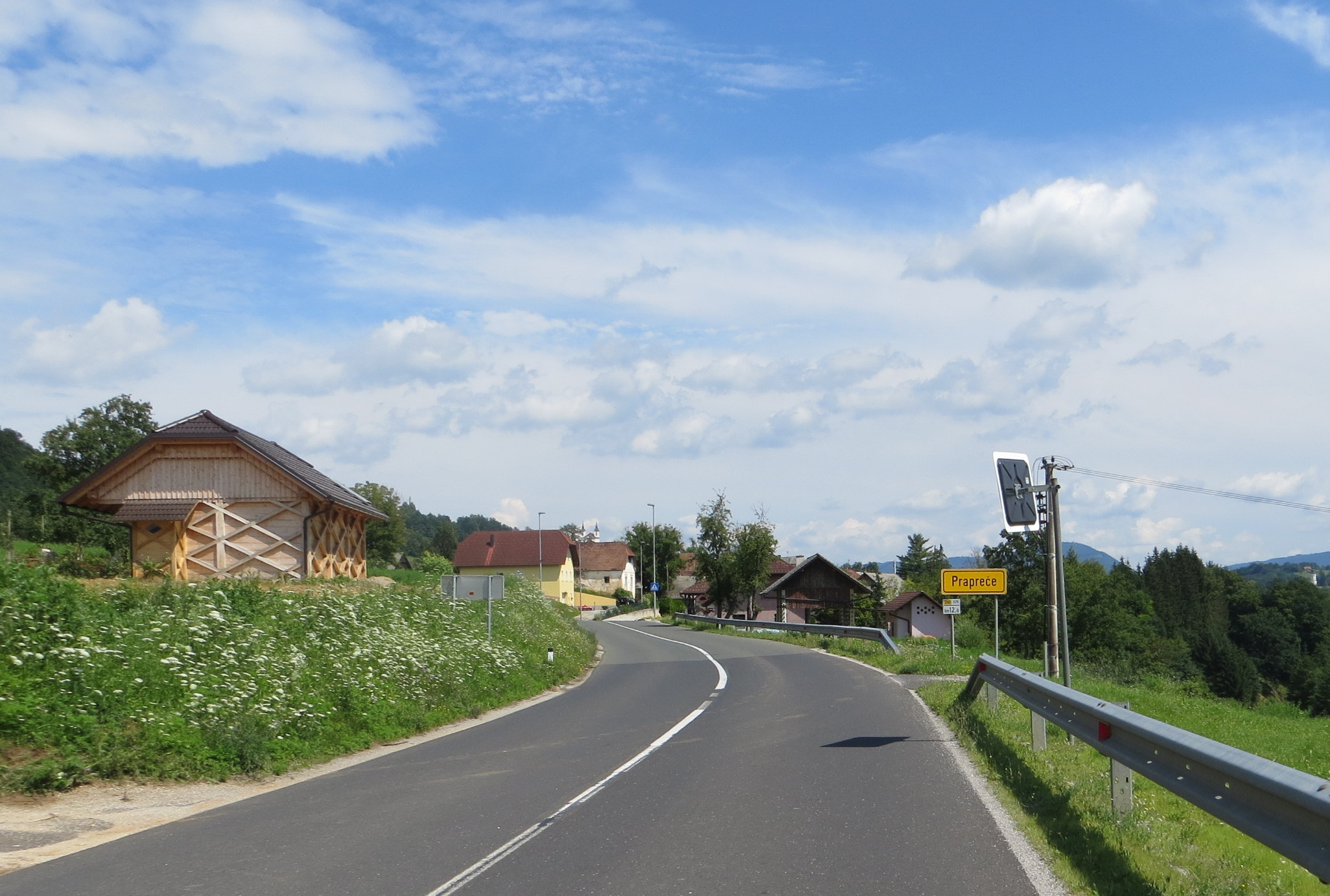

- Location in Slovenia
- Coordinates: 45°50′8.09″N 14°55′18.67″E
- Country: Slovenia
- Traditional region: Lower Carniola
- Statistical region: Southeast Slovenia
- Municipality: Žužemberk

Area
  - Total: 1.05 km^{2} (0.41 sq mi)
- Elevation: 221.3 m (726 ft)

Population (2002)
  - Total: 75

Prapreče (pronounced [ˈpɾaːpɾɛtʃɛ]; German: Prapretsche) is a settlement in the Municipality of Žužemberk in southeastern Slovenia. It lies on the left bank of the Krka River immediately northwest of Žužemberk itself. The area is part of the historical region of Lower Carniola. The municipality is now included in the Southeast Slovenia Statistical Region.

== Cultural heritage ==
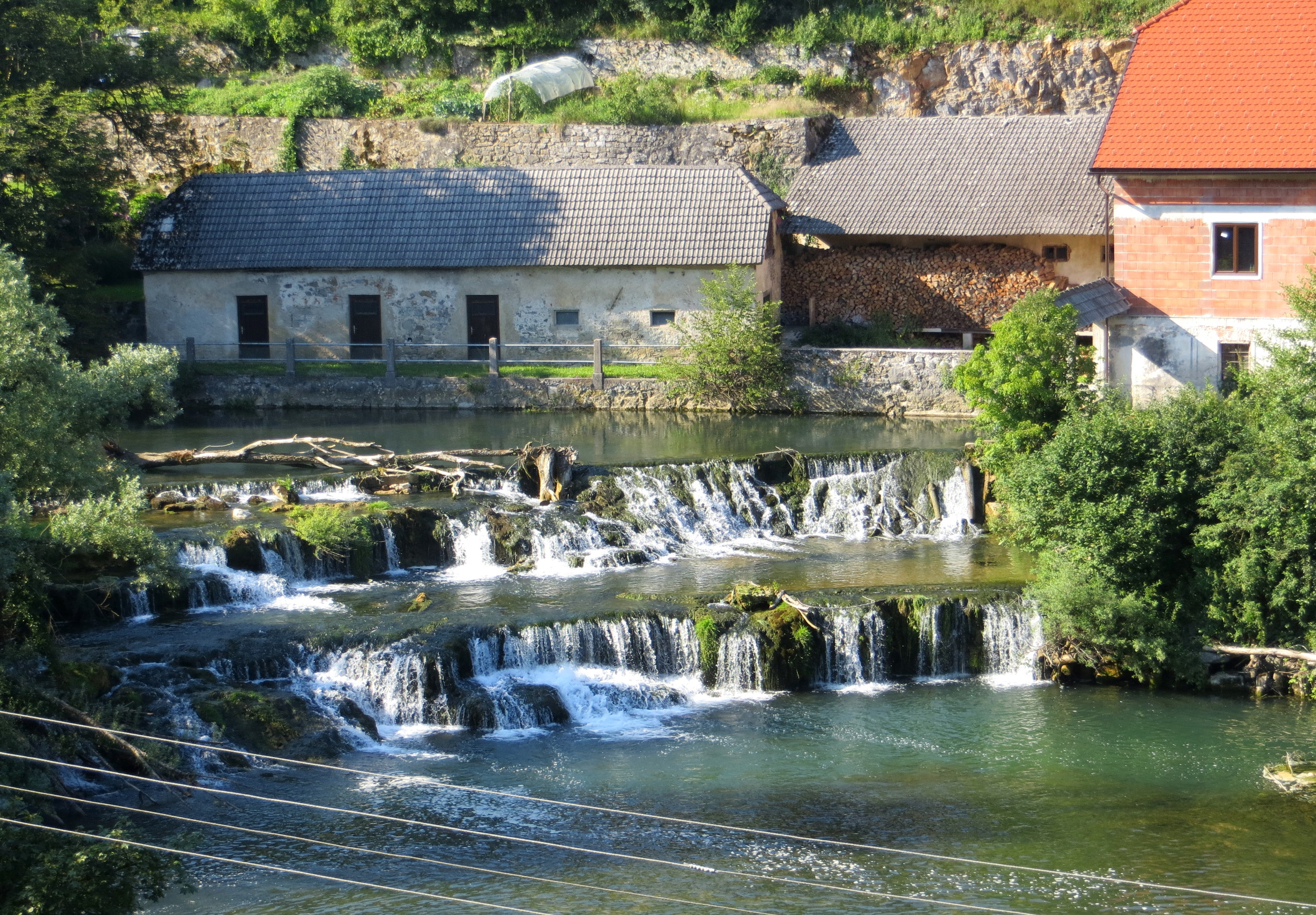
The Vehovec Mill

There are two mills on the left bank of the Krka River in the southwestern part of Prapreče. The Vehovec Grain Mill and Sawmill (Vehovčev mlin in žaga) dates from about 1800 and is housed in the lower part of a two-story building. The grain mill operated in it for 200 years before it was removed in 1980. The sawmill had a Venetian frame saw that stopped working in 1950 and was removed. The millrace and sluice have been preserved. The Zajc Mill (Zajčev mlin) stands immediately southeast of the Vehovec Mill in a building that dates to the first quarter of the 19th century but has been remodeled several times. It contains two old-fashioned sets of millstones and a roller mill, and it stands nest to a small hydroelectric station with a radial Francis turbine.
