= Dolenje Gradišče pri Šentjerneju =

- Location in Slovenia
- Coordinates: 45°50′39.87″N 15°17′26.06″E
- Country: Slovenia
- Traditional region: Lower Carniola
- Statistical region: Southeast Slovenia
- Municipality: Šentjernej

Area
  - Total: 0.68 km^{2} (0.26 sq mi)
- Elevation: 172.2 m (565 ft)

Population (2002)
  - Total: 113
- Postal code: 8310

Dolenje Gradišče pri Šentjerneju (pronounced [dɔˈleːnjɛ ɡɾaˈdiːʃtʃɛ pɾi ʃɛntjɛɾˈnɛːju]; German: Untergradische) is a settlement in the Municipality of Šentjernej in southeastern Slovenia. The area is part of the traditional region of Lower Carniola. It is now included in the Southeast Slovenia Statistical Region.

== Name ==
The name of the settlement was changed from Dolenje Gradišče to Dolenje Gradišče pri Šentjerneju in 1953. In the past the German name was Untergradische.

== Cultural heritage ==
Remains of a Roman villa rustica have been found in the hamlet of Lazice in the settlement.
