= Vrbovce, Šentjernej =

Vrbovce
- Location in Slovenia
- Coordinates: 45°49′34.4″N 15°21′26.19″E
- Country: Slovenia
- Traditional region: Lower Carniola
- Statistical region: Southeast Slovenia
- Municipality: Šentjernej

Area
  - Total: 0.7 km^{2} (0.27 sq mi)
- Elevation: 240.5 m (789 ft)

Population (2002)
  - Total: 49
- Postal code: 8310

Vrbovce (pronounced [ʋəɾˈboːu̯tsɛ] or [ˈʋəɾbɔu̯tsɛ]) is a settlement in the foothills of the Žumberak/Gorjanci range in the Municipality of Šentjernej in southeastern Slovenia. It is part of the traditional region of Lower Carniola and is now included in the Southeast Slovenia Statistical Region.
