= Šmarje, Šentjernej =

Šmarje
- Location in Slovenia
- Coordinates: 45°49′38.13″N 15°20′32.46″E
- Country: Slovenia
- Traditional region: Lower Carniola
- Statistical region: Southeast Slovenia
- Municipality: Šentjernej

Area
  - Total: 0.77 km^{2} (0.30 sq mi)
- Elevation: 214 m (702 ft)

Population (2002)
  - Total: 116
- Postal code: 8310

Šmarje (pronounced [ˈʃmaːɾjɛ]; German: Sankt Marein) is a settlement in the Municipality of Šentjernej in southeastern Slovenia. It is part of the traditional region of Lower Carniola and is now included in the Southeast Slovenia Statistical Region.

The local church from which the settlement gets its name is built on the eastern outskirts of the settlement and is dedicated to the Nativity of Mary. It belongs to the Parish of Šentjernej. It is an originally Gothic building remodelled in 1871. Its main altar dates to the early 18th century and the side altars are from the 19th century.
