= Krka (Sava) =

River in Slovenia

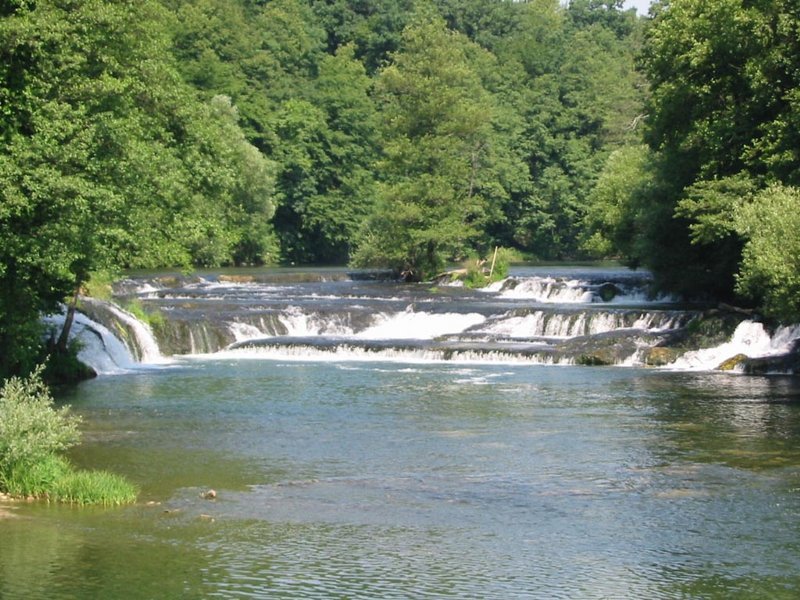
- The Krka in its upper part near Žužemberk

Location
- Country: Slovenia

Physical characteristics
- Source
  - location: Gradiček
  - coordinates: 45°53′22″N 14°46′17″E
  - elevation: 275 m (902 ft)
- Mouth
  - location: The Sava
  - coordinates: 45°53′37″N 15°36′1″E
  - elevation: 141 m (463 ft)
- Length: 94.6 km (58.8 mi)
- Basin size: 2,247 km^{2} (868 sq mi)

Basin features
- Progression: Sava→ Danube→ Black Sea

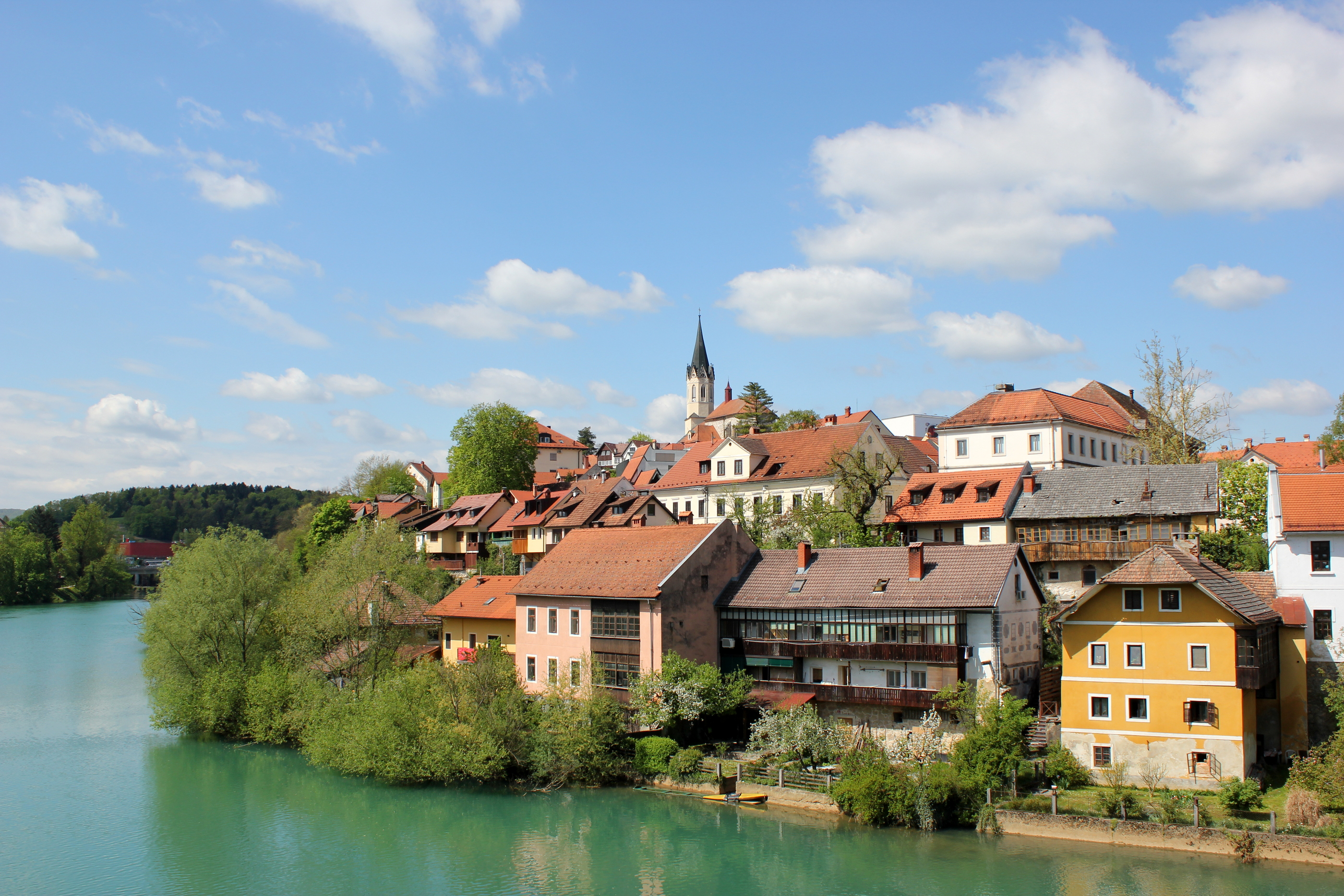
The Krka flowing through Novo Mesto

The Krka (pronounced [ˈkə̀ɾka]; German: Gurk, German pronunciation: [ɡʊʁk]; Latin: Corcoras) is a river in southeastern Slovenia (the traditional region of Lower Carniola), a right tributary of the Sava. With a length of 94.6 km (58.8 mi), it is the second-longest river flowing in its entirety in Slovenia, following the Savinja.

== Name ==
The name Krka was first attested in written sources in 799 as Corca (and as Gurke in 1025, and in Gurka fluvio in 1249). The Slovene name is derived from Slavic *Kъrka, based on the Romance name *Corcra or *Corca, derived in turn from Corcora. Many rivers had this name, or similar names, in antiquity. The name is believed to be of pre-Romance origin and may be based on onomatopoeia.

== Sources ==
The Krka sources in a karst spring, lying in a pocket valley below Krka Cave, north of the village of Krka, around 25 km (16 mi) southeast of Ljubljana, before flowing southeast. In heavy downpours, water bursts through the main entrance of Krka Cave and flows in a torrential waterfall over the steps in front of it.

== Course ==
The river passes the town of Žužemberk, Dolenjske Toplice, the town of Novo Mesto, Otočec Castle, and Kostanjevica na Krki, to meet the Sava at Brežice near the Croatian border. Its largest tributary is the Prečna, the continuation of the Temenica River.
