= Šentjernej =

Settlement in Slovenia

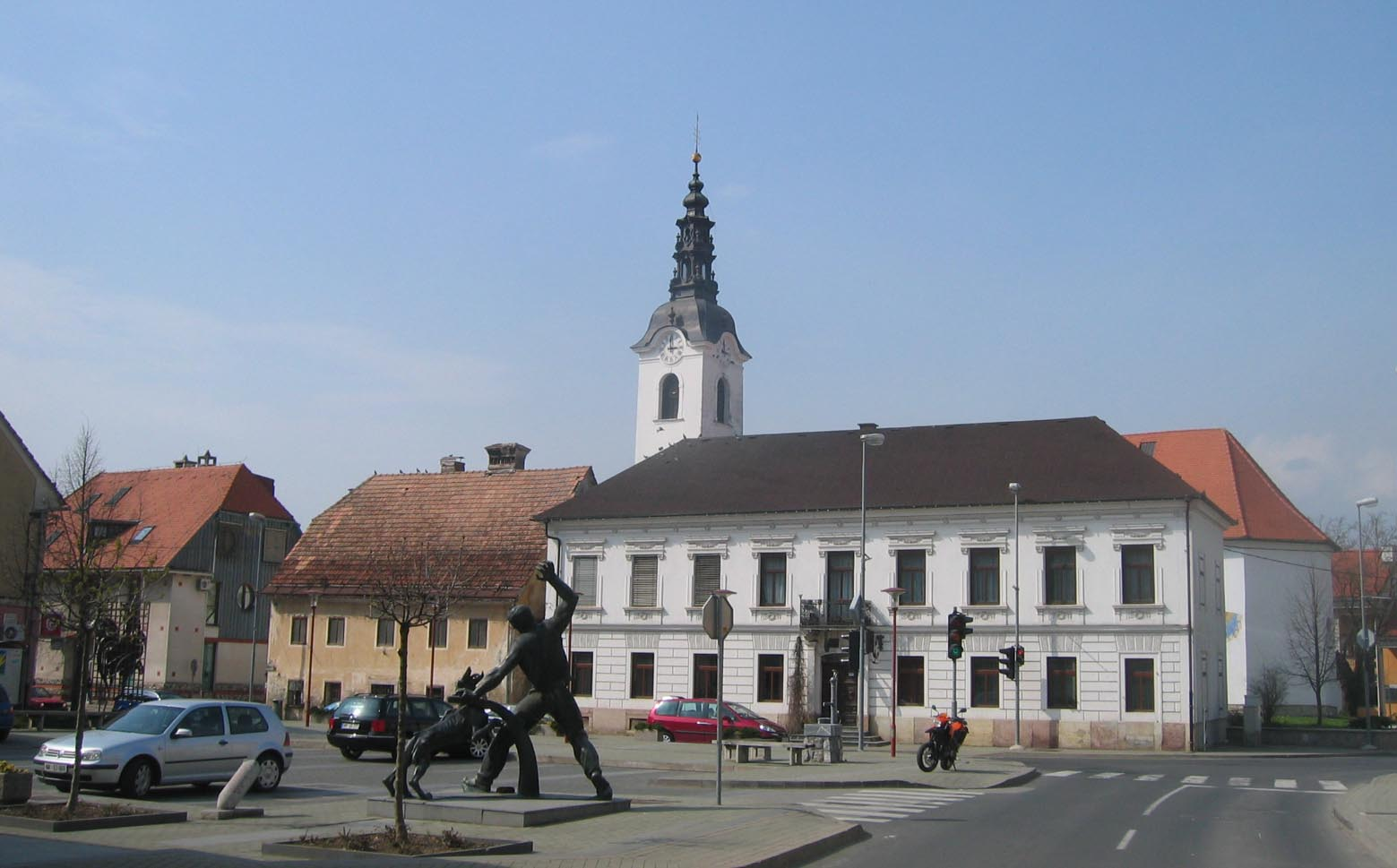

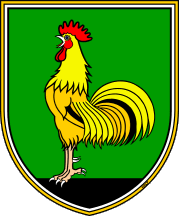
- Coat of arms

- Location in Slovenia
- Coordinates: 45°50′20″N 15°20′10″E
- Country: Slovenia
- Traditional region: Lower Carniola
- Statistical region: Southeast Slovenia
- Municipality: Šentjernej

Area
  - Total: 2.08 km^{2} (0.80 sq mi)
- Elevation: 198.8 m (652 ft)

Population (2019)
  - Total: 1,434
  - Density: 689/km^{2} (1,790/sq mi)
- Postal code: 8310

Šentjernej (pronounced [ʃɛnˈtjɛːɾnɛi̯] or [ʃənˈtjɛːɾnɛi̯]; in older sources also Šent Jernej, German: Sankt Bartlmä) is a small town in southeastern Slovenia. It is the seat of the Municipality of Šentjernej. It lies in the center of the Šentjernej Plain (Slovene: Šentjernejsko polje), which is part of the larger Krka Flat (Slovene: Krška ravan). The area is part of the traditional region of Lower Carniola. It is now included in the Southeast Slovenia Statistical Region.

== Church ==
The parish church, from which the town also gets its name, is dedicated to Saint Bartholomew (Slovene: sveti Jernej) and belongs to the Roman Catholic Diocese of Novo Mesto. It is a Baroque building with remains of two earlier churches, one Romanesque from the 12th century and the other a 15th-century Gothic one, preserved in the floor of the current building. Two 18th-century side altars were brought to the church from the Cistercian monastery at Kostanjevica.

== Twin towns — sister cities ==
Šentjernej is twinned with:

- Břeclav, Czech Republic
