= Dobrava =

Dobrava is a Slovene place name that may refer to:

- Blejska Dobrava, a village in the Municipality of Jesenice, northwestern Slovenia
- Cerkljanska Dobrava, a village in the Municipality of Cerklje na Gorenjskem, northwestern Slovenia
- Dobrava, Izola, a village in the Municipality of Izola, Slovenia, southwestern Slovenia
- Dobrava, Križevci, a village in the Municipality of Križevci, Slovenia, northeastern Slovenia
- Dobrava, Ormož, a village in the Municipality of Ormož, northeastern Slovenia
- Dobrava, Radeče, a village in the Municipality of Radeče, southeastern Slovenia
- Dobrava, Radlje ob Dravi, a village in the Municipality of Radlje ob Dravi, northeastern Slovenia
- Dobrava, Trebnje, a village in the Municipality of Trebnje, southeastern Slovenia
- Dobrava ob Krki, a village in the Municipality of Krško, southeastern Slovenia
- Dobrava pod Rako, a village in the Municipality of Krško, southeastern Slovenia
- Dobrava pri Konjicah, a village in the Municipality of Slovenske Konjice, northeastern Slovenia
- Dobrava pri Kostanjevici, a village in the Municipality of Kostanjevica na Krki, southeastern Slovenia
- Dobrava pri Stični, a village in the Municipality of Ivančna Gorica, southeastern Slovenia
- Dobrava pri Škocjanu, a village in the Municipality of Škocjan, southeastern Slovenia
- Dolenja Dobrava, Gorenja Vas–Poljane, a village in the Municipality of Gorenja Vas–Poljane
- Dolenja Dobrava, Trebnje, a village in the Municipality of Trebnje, southeastern Slovenia
- Gorenja Dobrava, Gorenja Vas–Poljane, a village in the Municipality of Gorenja Vas–Poljane
- Gorenja Dobrava, Trebnje, a village in the Municipality of Trebnje, southeastern Slovenia
- Komendska Dobrava, a village in the Municipality of Komenda
- Mala Dobrava, a village in the Municipality of Ivančna Gorica, southeastern Slovenia
- Mislinjska Dobrava, a village in the Municipality of Slovenj Gradec, northeastern Slovenia
- Spodnja Dobrava, Moravče, a village in the Municipality of Moravče, central Slovenia
- Spodnja Dobrava, Radovljica, a village in the Municipality of Radovljica, northwestern Slovenia
- Srednja Dobrava, a village in the Municipality of Radovljica, northwestern Slovenia
- Velika Dobrava, a village in the Municipality of Ivančna Gorica, southeastern Slovenia
- Zgornja Dobrava, Moravče, a village in the Municipality of Moravče, central Slovenia
- Zgornja Dobrava, Radovljica, a village in the Municipality of Radovljica, northwestern Slovenia

== See also ==
- Dobrava (toponym)
