= Dobrava (toponym) =

Dobrava (Doe-bra-va) is a toponym with Slovene origins, used in Slovenia, Austria, Croatia and Italy. It derives from the Proto-Slavic word *dǫbъ meaning "oak". It can be translated into "oak grove" or "oak woods". The term dobrava is used exclusively for Quercus robur. Forests and other oak species have gained different sobriquets in modern usage. Toponyms that derive from the same root word, dob, are often confused with similar Slovene words — particularly dober and dobra, both meaning "good." In contrast to the term dobrava's specificity, however, dober and dobra may be used variably, as names for a miscellany of places.

== Slovenia ==
=== Villages ===
- Blejska Dobrava, a village in the Municipality of Jesenice, northwestern Slovenia
- Cerkljanska Dobrava, a village in the Municipality of Cerklje na Gorenjskem, northwestern Slovenia
- Dobrava, Izola, a village in the Municipality of Izola, Slovenia, southwestern Slovenia
- Dobrava, Križevci, a village in the Municipality of Križevci, Slovenia, northeastern Slovenia
- Dobrava, Ormož, a village in the Municipality of Ormož, northeastern Slovenia
- Dobrava, Radeče, a village in the Municipality of Radeče, southeastern Slovenia
- Dobrava, Radlje ob Dravi, a village in the Municipality of Radlje ob Dravi, northeastern Slovenia
- Dobrava, Trebnje, a village in the Municipality of Trebnje, southeastern Slovenia
- Dobrava ob Krki, a village in the Municipality of Krško, southeastern Slovenia
- Dobrava pod Rako, a village in the Municipality of Krško, southeastern Slovenia
- Dobrava pri Konjicah, a village in the Municipality of Slovenske Konjice, northeastern Slovenia
- Dobrava pri Kostanjevici, a village in the Municipality of Kostanjevica na Krki, southeastern Slovenia
- Dobrava pri Stični, a village in the Municipality of Ivančna Gorica, southeastern Slovenia
- Dobrava pri Škocjanu, a village in the Municipality of Škocjan, southeastern Slovenia
- Dolenja Dobrava, Gorenja Vas–Poljane, a village in the Municipality of Gorenja Vas–Poljane
- Dolenja Dobrava, Trebnje, a village in the Municipality of Trebnje, southeastern Slovenia
- Gorenja Dobrava, Gorenja Vas–Poljane, a village in the Municipality of Gorenja Vas–Poljane
- Gorenja Dobrava, Trebnje, a village in the Municipality of Trebnje, southeastern Slovenia
- Komendska Dobrava, a village in the Municipality of Komenda
- Mala Dobrava, a village in the Municipality of Ivančna Gorica, southeastern Slovenia
- Mislinjska Dobrava, a village in the Municipality of Slovenj Gradec, northeastern Slovenia
- Spodnja Dobrava, Moravče, a village in the Municipality of Moravče, central Slovenia
- Spodnja Dobrava, Radovljica, a village in the Municipality of Radovljica, northwestern Slovenia
- Srednja Dobrava, a village in the Municipality of Radovljica, northwestern Slovenia
- Velika Dobrava, a village in the Municipality of Ivančna Gorica, southeastern Slovenia
- Zgornja Dobrava, Moravče, a village in the Municipality of Moravče, central Slovenia
- Zgornja Dobrava, Radovljica, a village in the Municipality of Radovljica, northwestern Slovenia

=== Microtoponyms (around 150) ===
- Zajčja Dobrava
- Dobrava (river, Municipality of Vodice)
- Dobrava (forest and protected area near Dobova)
- Dobrava (forest near Muta)
- Dobrava (forest near Selnica ob Dravi)

== Austria ==
=== Microtoponyms ===
- Dobrawa (Kärnten / Völkermarkt)
- Dobrawa (Kärnten / Villach Land/ Hohenthurn)
- Dobrawa (Kärnten / Villach Land/ Arnoldstein)
- Dobrava (forest near Villach)
- Dobrava (forest near Wildenstein)
- Dobrava (forest in Mittlern)

== Croatia ==
=== Villages ===
- Gornja Dubrava - former Dobrava (Međimurska županija / Gornji Mihaljevec)
- Donja Dubrava - former Dobrava (Međimurska županija)

== Italy ==
=== Microtoponyms ===
- Stallo Dobrave (Chiusaforte / Friuli-Venezia Giulia)

== Similar toponyms ==
- Dob
- Dobajna
- Dobe
- Dobenje
- Dobeno
- Doberdob
- Dobindol
- Dobinje
- Dobje
- Doblar
- Dobležiče
- Dobliče
- Dobličica
- Dobova
- Dobovci
- Dobovec
- Dobovica
- Dobovlje
- Dobravica
- Dobravka
- Dobravlje
- Dobravšce
- Dobrča
- Dobrla
- Dobrljevo
- Dobrova
- Dobrovce
- Dobrovec
- Dobrovlje
- Dobrovnik
- Dobrovo
- Dobrovščak
- Dobrunje
- Dobruša

== Similar toponyms in other Slavic languages ==
- Bosnian: Dubrava
- Bulgarian: Dabrava
- Czech: Doubrava
- Croatian: Dubrava
- Polish: Dubrawa
- Serbian: Dubrava
- Slovak: Dúbrava
- Macedonian: Dobrava
