= Radovna =

Radovna may refer to:

- Radovna (river), a river in Slovenia
- Radovna Valley, a valley in Slovenia
- Radovna, a village in the Municipality of Gorje, Slovenia
- Zgornja Radovna, a village in the Municipality of Kranjska Gora, Slovenia
