= Blejska Dobrava =

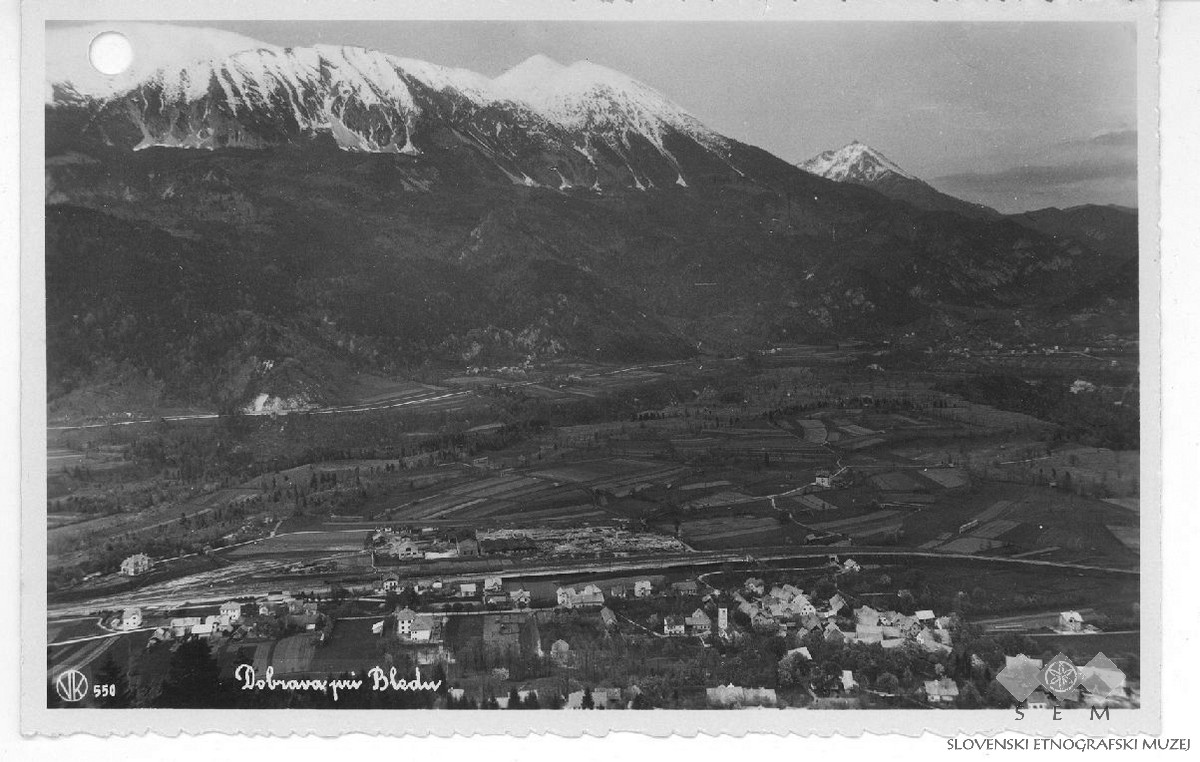
- Postcard of Blejska Dobrava

- Location in Slovenia
- Coordinates: 46°24′45″N 14°5′41″E
- Country: Slovenia
- Traditional region: Upper Carniola
- Statistical region: Upper Carniola
- Municipality: Jesenice
- Elevation: 582 m (1,909 ft)

Population (2002)
  - Total: 977

Blejska Dobrava (pronounced [ˈbleːi̯ska dɔˈbɾaːʋa], German: Dobrawa bei Asp) is a settlement in the Municipality of Jesenice, in the Upper Carniola region of Slovenia.

== Geography ==
Blejska Dobrava is located at the base of the Mežakla Plateau, on a series of river terraces between the right bank of the Sava Dolinka and the Radovna River as it exits the Vintgar Gorge. The Vintgar hydroelectric plant on the Radovna stands nearby, as does the scenic Vintgar Gorge, a popular tourist attraction. The settlement is located on the road connecting the Upper Sava Valley to Bled (through the hamlet of Poljane in Spodnje Gorje). The Jesenice–Bohinj railroad also passes through, stopping at a small station. The Jesenice municipal cemetery is located nearby. The Koroška Bela Primary School, in the village of Koroška Bela across the Sava Valley, operates a branch location in Blejska Dobrava.

== Name ==
Blejska Dobrava was attested in written sources as Harde in 1253, Hard in 1368, and Oberhardt in 1498. The modern Slovene name Blejska Dobrava (literally, 'Bled Dobrava') reflects its original connection to the nearby town of Bled. The place name Dobrava is relatively frequent in Slovenia. It is derived from the Slovene common noun dobrava 'gently rolling partially wooded land' (and archaically 'woods, grove'). The name therefore refers to the local geography.

== History ==
Blejska Dobrava is one of the oldest villages in the area, attested from the 12th century, Once predominantly agricultural, Blejska Dobrava has partially urbanized under the influence of industry from the nearby municipal seat of Jesenice. There is a manufacturing plant, tracing its roots back to a prewar electrode factory, as well as two smaller industrial facilities.

== St. Stephen's Church ==
St. Stephen's Church (Slovene: Cerkev svetega Štefana), dedicated to Saint Stephen, was originally Gothic, with a rectangular nave and pentagonal presbytery, but was rebuilt in 1743 in the Baroque style. A wall around the church encloses the old, abandoned graveyard, with some of the older graves still marked, including the grave of two sisters (Katra and Jera) of the poet France Prešeren, built into the church's outside wall.

== See also ==
- Dobrava (toponym)
