= Gorenja Dobrava =

Gorenja Dobrava may refer to the following places in Slovenia

- Gorenja Dobrava, Gorenja Vas–Poljane
- Gorenja Dobrava, Trebnje

== See also ==
- Gornja Dubrava, Croatia
- Gornje Dubrave, Croatia
