= Rjavina =

Mountain in Slovenia

Coordinates: 46.39206°N 13.88243°E

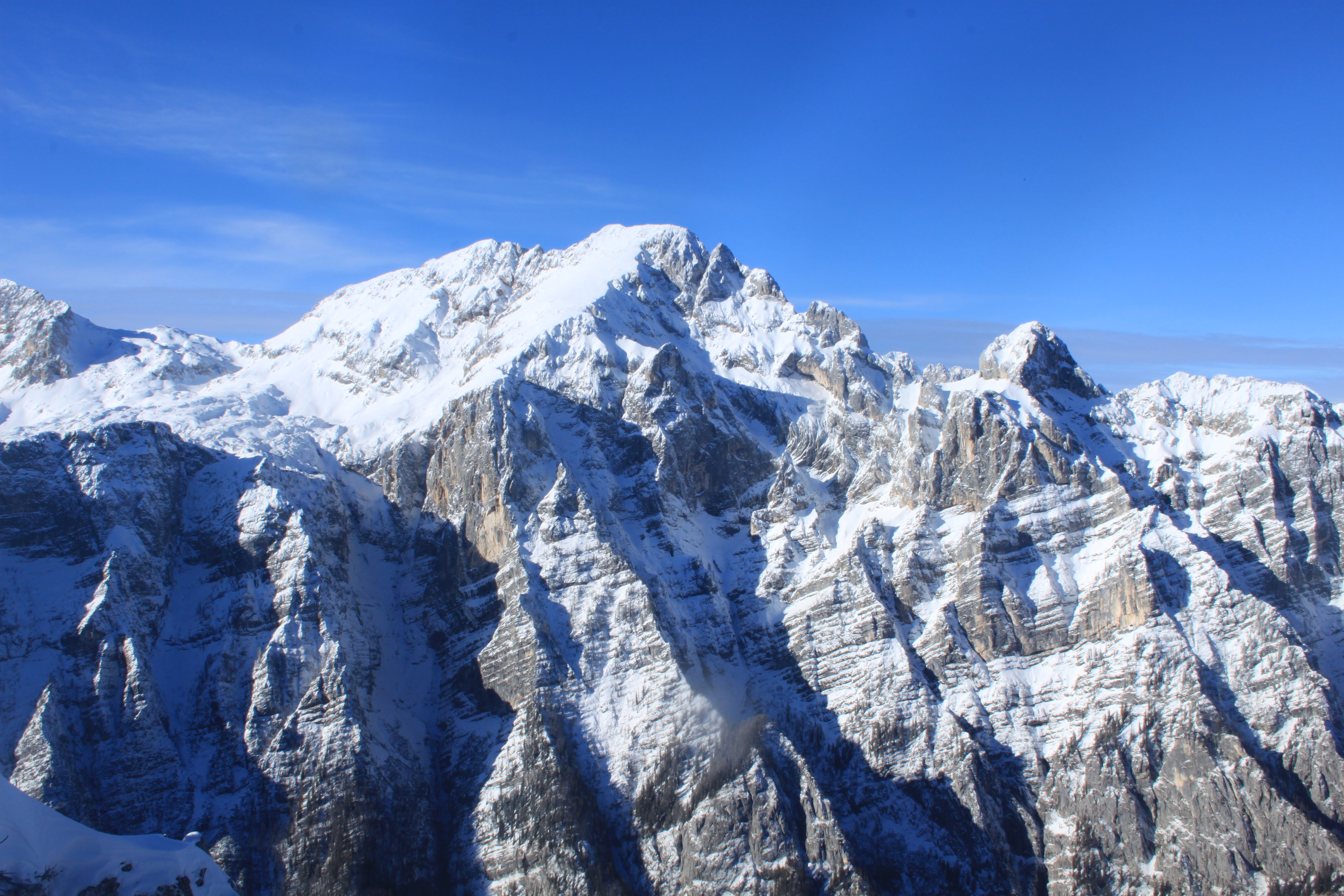
Rjavina

Rjavina is a mountain in Slovenian Julian Alps. It rises 2,532 m (8,307 ft) above sea level. Located between two Alpine glacial valleys, Kot and Krma, it offers nice views to some of the highest Slovenian peaks, including Triglav, Škrlatica and Rž.

Southeast of the peak there lies one of the highest alpine huts in Slovenia, The Valentin Stanič lodge, at 2,332 m (7,651 ft) above sea level.
