= Postal codes in Yugoslavia =

Yugoslavian postal codes were introduced on January 1, 1971 and consisted of five digits. The first two digits roughly corresponded to the routing zones, mostly matching each of the Yugoslav republics: 1, 2 and 3 for Serbia, 4 and 5 for Croatia, 6 for Slovenia, 7 for Bosnia and Herzegovina, 8 for Montenegro and 9 for Macedonia. District seat cities usually had 000 as the last three digits, while smaller towns and villages had non-round last three digits.

Former Yugoslav postal codes are still used in Serbia and Montenegro. Bosnia and Herzegovina also continues to use them, but with small adaptations to new administrative structures. North Macedonia and Slovenia removed the first digit and the remaining four digits continue to be in use. In Croatia and Kosovo have new postal code systems.

== Address books ==
- Spisak poštanskih brojeva jedinica poštanske mreže SFR Jugoslavije, 1971. (in Serbo-Croatian)
- Popis poštanskih brojeva u SFRJ, PTT, 1971. (in Serbo-Croatian)
- Priručnik za primenu poštanskog broja, SFRJ, 1971. (in Serbo-Croatian)

== See also ==
- Postal codes in Bosnia and Herzegovina
- Postal codes in Croatia
- Postal codes in Kosovo
- Postal codes in North Macedonia
- Postal codes in Serbia
- Postal codes in Slovenia
- Postage stamps and postal history of Yugoslavia
