= Tosc (mountain) =

Mountain in Slovenia

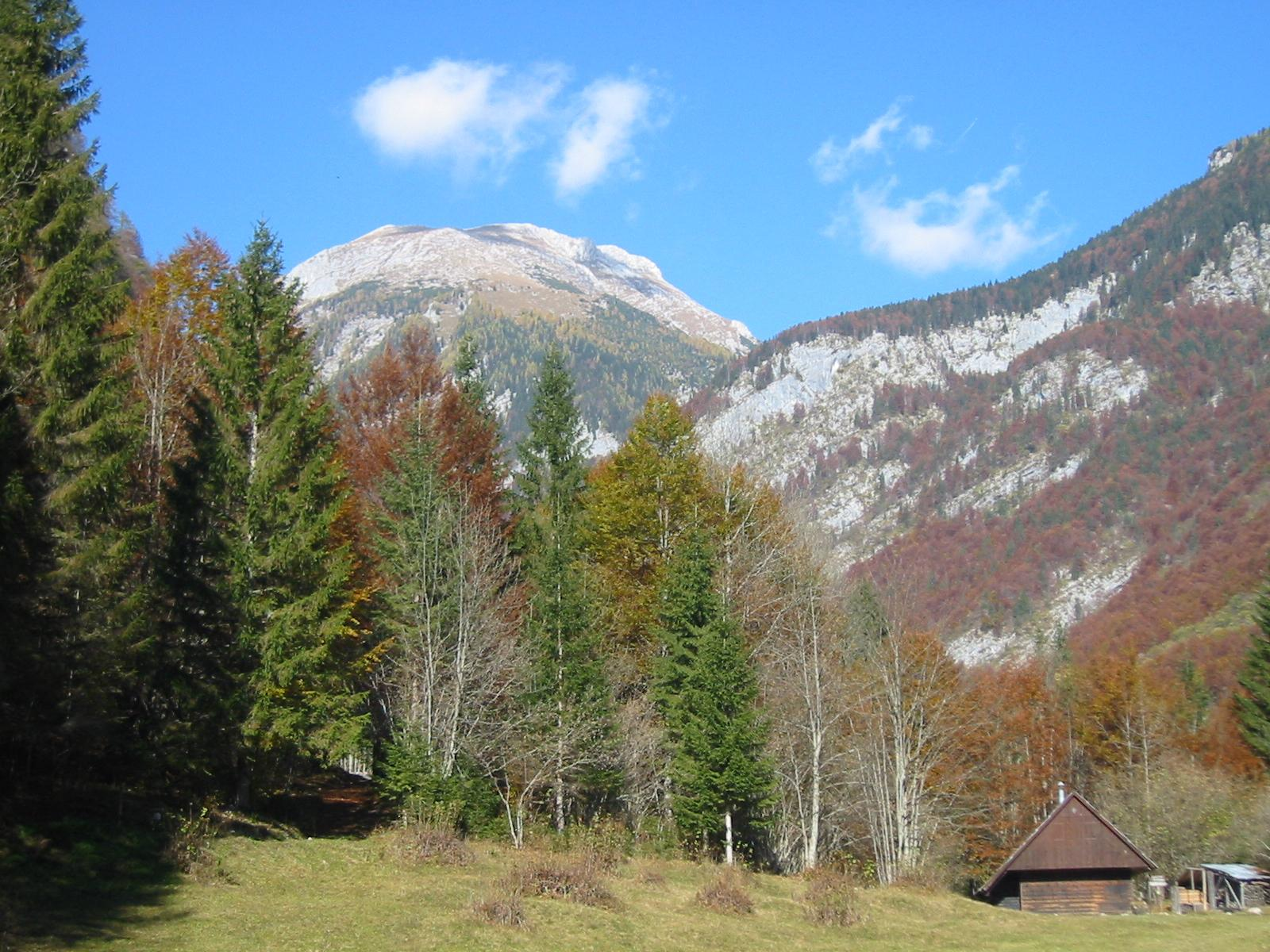

Highest point
- Elevation: 2,275 m (7,464 ft)
- Prominence: 300 m (980 ft)
- Coordinates: 46°21′24.192″N 13°52′6.240″E

Geography
- Location within Slovenia
- Location: Upper Carniola, Slovenia
- Parent range: Julian Alps

Tosc (2,275 metres or 7,464 feet), formerly also known as Tolstec, is a mountain of the central Julian Alps, located in Upper Carniola, western Slovenia.

The mountain stands south of Triglav, rising above the Voje Valley to the south and Big Field Pasture (planina Velo polje) to the west. There is a steep gorge in it facing the Krma Valley to the northeast.

== Recreation ==
Tosc is protected within Triglav National Park. Its southern slope is frequently used by ski tourers.

=== Routes ===
- 3¾h From Pokljuka (1340 m) (easy route)
- 4¼h From Uskovnica (1200 m) (challenging route)
