= Radovna, Gorje =

Radovna
- Location in Slovenia
- Coordinates: 46°25′14.19″N 13°58′54.26″E
- Country: Slovenia
- Traditional Region: Upper Carniola
- Statistical region: Upper Carniola
- Municipality: Gorje
- Elevation: 691.8 m (2,270 ft)

Population (2020)
  - Total: 14

Radovna (pronounced [ˈɾaːdɔu̯na]) is a settlement in the Radovna Valley in the Municipality of Gorje in the Upper Carniola region of Slovenia.

== Radovna Massacre ==
On 29 September 1944 the entire hamlet of Srednja Radovna was burned to the ground by the German Army after a minor engagement with the Partisans in revenge for two of their numbers being taken and the locals' unwillingness to inform on the Partisans. Twenty-four villagers were killed and a memorial to the victims of this event has been erected in the valley.
