= Radovna Valley =

Valley in Slovenia

Coordinates: 46°26′21″N 13°54′2″E

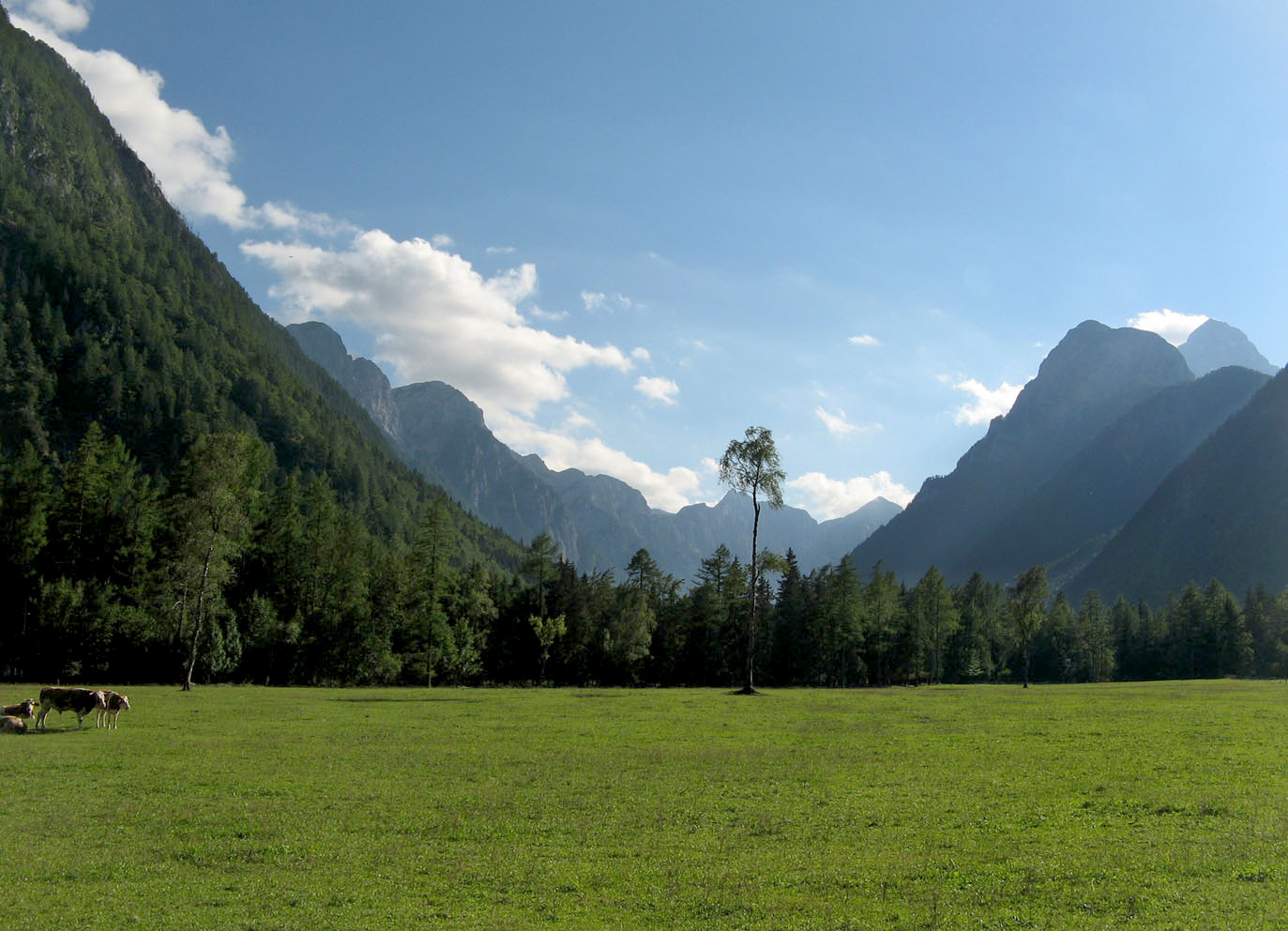
The Radovna Valley

The Radovna Valley (Slovene: Radovna, dolina Radovne) is an alpine valley in the Julian Alps in northwestern Slovenia, traditionally part of Upper Carniola. It is included in Triglav National Park in its entirety.

== Geography ==
The Radovna Valley is surrounded by the northern extensions of the Pokljuka Plateau, the foothills of the Triglav range, and the highest peak of the Mežakla Plateau, Jerebikovec (1,593 m or 5,226 ft). It is connected by a road via the Kosmač Pass to the north with nearby Mojstrana, and a road leads down the valley toward Bled.

The Radovna River, created by smaller tributaries from the glacial valleys of the Krma and Kot valleys, flows through the valley. From the valley, the Radovna continues its flow into the Vintgar Gorge, a deep and picturesque canyon, and finally joins the Sava Dolinka near Moste.

Extensive pastures in the valley are used for cattle. There are also a number of private holiday homes scattered throughout the valley.

The largest settlement in the valley is Zgornja Radovna.

== Pocar Farm ==
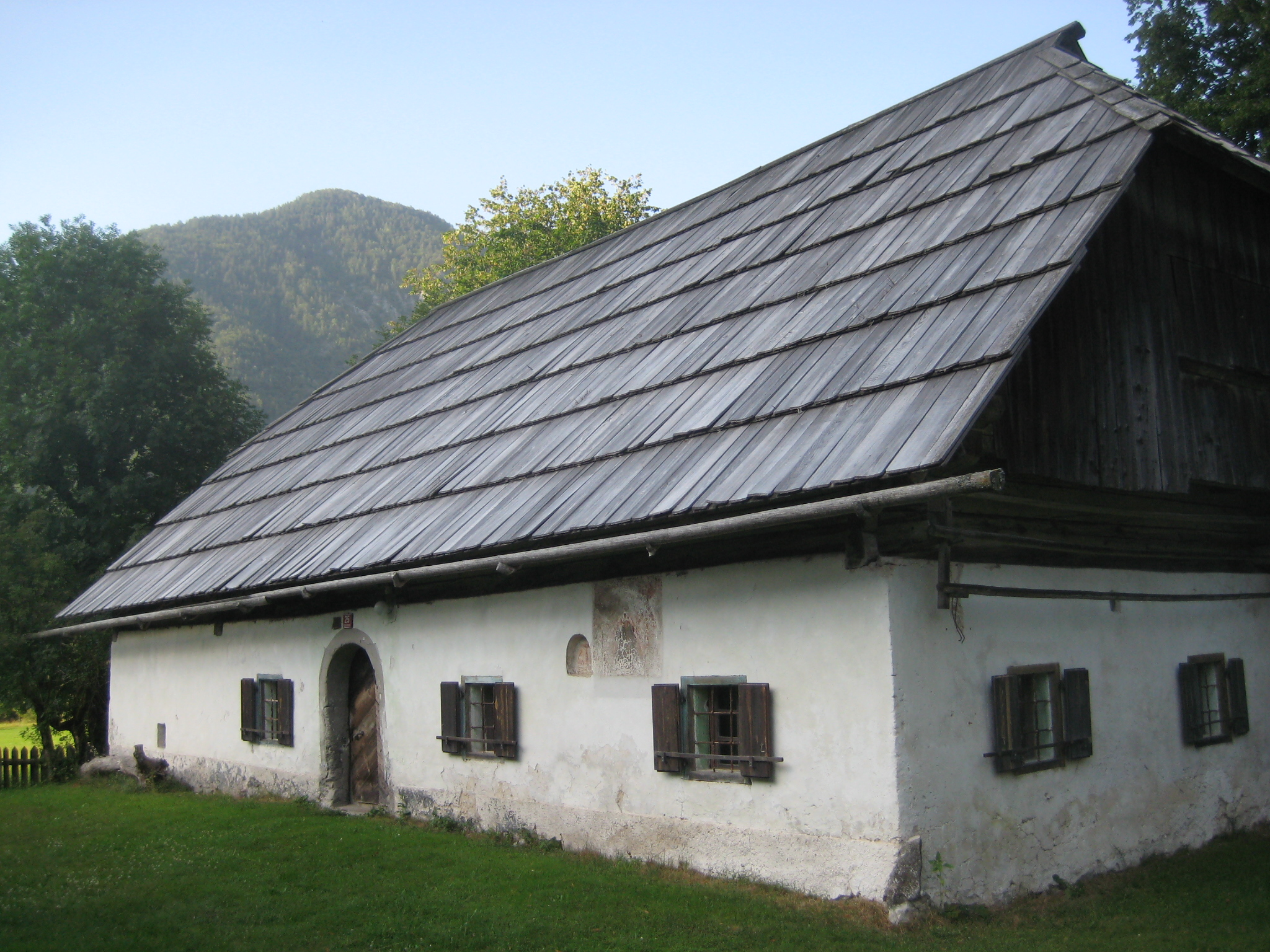
The Pocar farmhouse

The Pocar Farm (Pocarjeva domačija), in Zgornja Radovna, has one of the oldest traditional farmhouses in Triglav National Park, with the date 1775 engraved on one of its beams. It was recorded in a written document from 1672. It is one of the best-preserved examples of traditional 18th-century Alpine architecture and has been protected as a cultural monument of national significance. The farm now hosts an ethnographic museum and an information point for Triglav National Park.
