= Dob (toponym) =

Slovene toponym, found in Slovenia, Austria and Italy

Dob is a Slovene toponym, found in Slovenia, Austria and Italy. It derives from a Proto-Slavic word dǫbъ (oak). The word dob is today used exclusively for Quercus robur (Slovene: dob), as other oak species have progressively taken other names. Toponyms having their root in the word "dob" are sometimes hard to distinguish from other similar Slovene words —— particularly dober, and dobra (English: good), which can be used to refer to many other types of places.

== Slovenia ==
=== Villages ===
- Dob, Domžale, village in central Slovenia
- Dob pri Šentvidu, village in the Municipality of Ivančna Gorica in central Slovenia.

=== Hamlets ===
- Dob, a hamlet of Slovenska Vas

== Austria ==
=== Villages ===
- Dob (German: Aich), (Municipality Bleiburg, Carinthia)
- Dob (German: Aich), (Municipality Velden am Wörther See, Carinthia)

== Italy ==
=== Villages ===
- Doberdob (Italian: Doberdò del Lago), (Province of Gorizia, Friuli-Venezia Giulia) - meaning good (dober) oak.

== Toponyms and microtoponyms with the word dob as their root ==
=== Slovenia ===
- Dobe
- Dobenje
- Dobeno
- Doberdob
- Dobindol
- Dobinje
- Dobje
- Doblar
- Dobležiče
- Dobliče
- Dobličica
- Dobova
- Dobovci
- Dobovec
- Dobovica
- Dobovlje
- Dobrava
- Dobravica
- Dobravka
- Dobravlje
- Dobravšce
- Dobrča
- Dobrla
- Dobrljevo
- Dobrova
- Dobrovce
- Dobrovec
- Dobrovlje
- Dobrovnik
- Dobrovo
- Dobrovščak
- Dobrunje
- Dobruša

=== Austria ===
==== Villages ====
- Dobajna/Dobein (Municipality Keutschach am See, Carinthia)
- Dobajnica/Dobeinitz (Municipality Keutschach am See, Carinthia)
- Dobje/Aich (Municipality Grafenstein, Carinthia)
- Dobrawa (Kärnten / Völkermarkt)
- Dobrawa (Kärnten / Villach Land/ Hohenthurn)
- Dobrawa (Kärnten / Villach Land/ Arnoldstein)
- Dobrova/Dobrowa (Municipality Ruden, Völkermarkt, Cainthia
- Dobrova/Dobrowa (Municipality Bleiburg, Carinthia)
- Dobrova/Dobrowa (Municipality St. Margareten im Rosental, Carinthia)
- Dobrova/Hart (Municipality Eberndorf)
- Dobrova/hart (Municipality Sittersdorf, Carinthia)
- Dobrowa (Municipality Völkermarkt)

==== Microtoponyms ====
- Dobrava mountain near Arnoldstein, Carinthia
- Dobrava (forest near Villach, Carinthia)
- Dobrava (forest near Wildenstein, Carinthia)
- Dobrava (forest in Mittlern, Carinthia)

=== Italy ===
==== Villages ====
- Dobbia (Staranzano, Friuli-Venezia Giulia)
- Dobie (San Pietro al Natisone, Friuli-Venezia Giulia)

==== Hamlets ====
- Stallo Dobrave (Chiusaforte / Friuli-Venezia Giulia)

=== Croatia ===
- Dobovec (Cvetlin, Municipality Bednja, Varaždinska županija)
- Gornja Dubrava - former Dobrava (Gornji Mihaljevec, Međimurska županija)
- Donja Dubrava - former Dobrava (Međimurska županija)
