= Zgornja Radovna =

- Location in Slovenia
- Coordinates: 46°25′52.3″N 13°55′44.77″E
- Country: Slovenia
- Traditional region: Upper Carniola
- Statistical region: Upper Carniola
- Municipality: Kranjska Gora
- Elevation: 786.8 m (2,581 ft)

Population (2002)
  - Total: 67

Zgornja Radovna (pronounced [ˈzɡoːɾnja ˈɾaːdɔu̯na]) is a dispersed settlement in the Municipality of Kranjska Gora, northwestern Slovenia, belonging to the traditional region of Upper Carniola. The village lies at the juncture of the Kot Valley and the northern part of the Krma Valley (i.e., the Lower Krma Valley, Slovene: Spodnja Krma). The Radovna River, a tributary of the Sava Dolinka, emerges under the Jutrova Skala Slope (Jutrova skala) in the northeastern part of the settlement.

== Pocar Farm ==
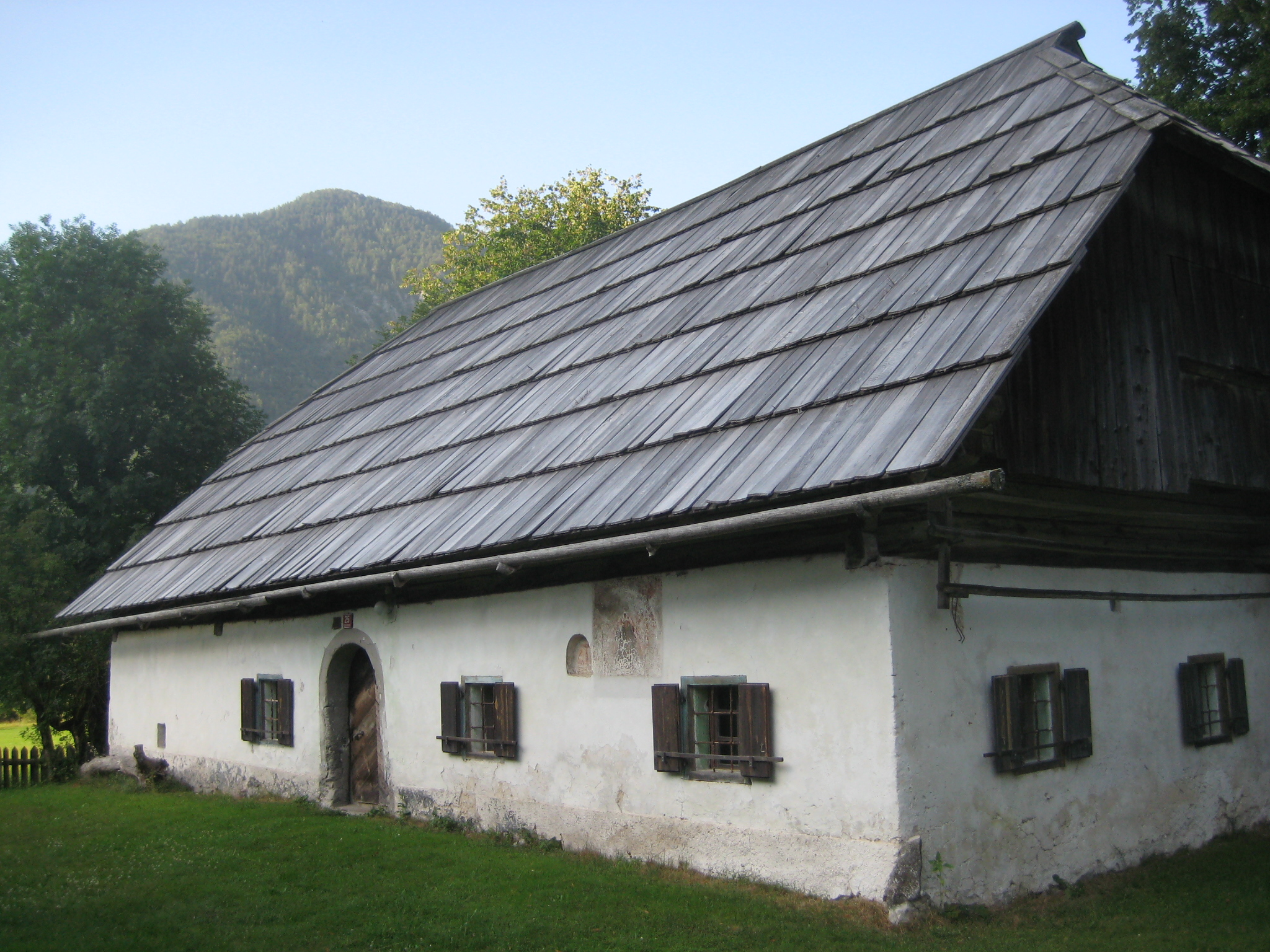
Farmhouse at the Pocar Farm

The Pocar Farm (Pocarjeva domačija) in Zgornja Radovna has one of the oldest traditional farmhouses in Triglav National Park, with the year 1775 engraved on one of its beams and a written attestation from 1672. It is one of the best-preserved examples of traditional 18th-century Alpine architecture and has been protected as a cultural monument of national significance. The farm now hosts an ethnographic museum and an information point for Triglav National Park.
