= Mojstrana =

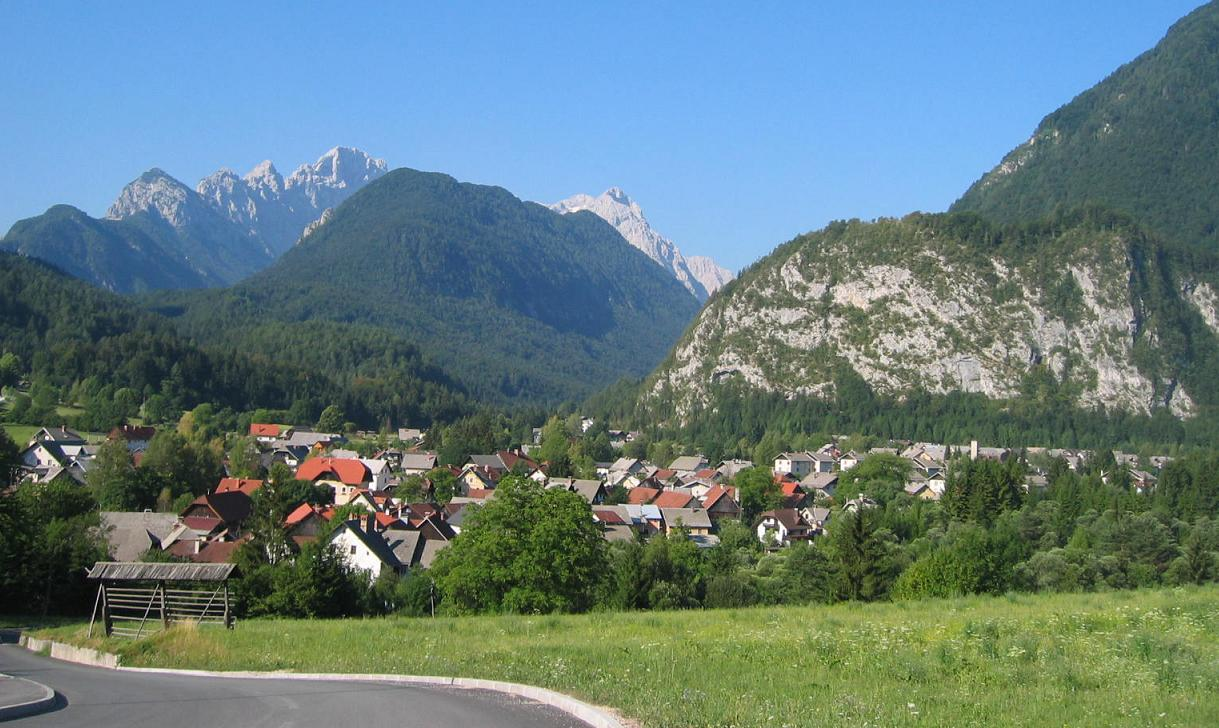

- Location in Slovenia
- Coordinates: 46°27′39.38″N 13°56′5.64″E
- Country: Slovenia
- Traditional region: Upper Carniola
- Statistical region: Upper Carniola
- Municipality: Kranjska Gora

Area
  - Total: 62.6 km^{2} (24.2 sq mi)
- Elevation: 660.9 m (2,168 ft)

Population (2012)
  - Total: 1,179

Mojstrana (pronounced [ˈmoːi̯stɾana]; German: Meistern) is a village in the Municipality of Kranjska Gora in the Upper Carniola region of Slovenia.

== Geography ==
Mojstrana is located in the Upper Sava Valley at the point where Bistrica Creek joins the Sava River below the main road from Jesenice to Kranjska Gora at an elevation of 641 m. The glacial Vrata Valley leads from Mojstrana towards the southwest past Peričnik Falls to the north face of Mount Triglav. The road to three other valleys—Radovna, Krma, and Kot—also begins in Mojstrana.

== Name ==
Mojstrana was first attested in 1763–87 as Moistrana. The suffix -ana indicates that the name is of Romance or pre-Romance origin. The root *mojstr- is believed to be related to Friulian majostre 'strawberry, blueberry' (cf. the oronym Mojstrovka from this root), thus referring to an area rich in strawberries or blueberries.

== History ==
The development of the settlement is connected to ironworks and iron ore in the area as well as a cement works that ceased to operate after the First World War.

=== Mass grave ===
Mojstrana is the site of a mass grave associated with the Second World War. The Mlačca Mass Grave (Slovene: Grobišče Mlačca), also known as the Tnal Mass Grave (Grobišče pod Tnalom), is located in the woods south of the settlement, at a leveled area in a ravine about 50 meters (160 ft) west of the road to the Radovna Valley. It contains the remains of between 10 and 20 German soldiers, and perhaps civilians as well.

== Economy ==
Its inhabitants today are mostly either farmers or work in the local metal, or wood production. Tourism is also important because Mojstrana is the starting point for many routes in the Julian Alps and the Karavanke. Since 7 August 2010, Mojstrana has housed the Slovenian Alpine Museum, which presents the tradition of mountaineering in Slovenia. There is also a small ski slope next to the village.

== Sights ==
Local attractions include the 17th-century church of St. Clement, the small Triglav museum, a giant walnut tree with a 470 cm circumference in the middle of the village, the Šmerc and Ambrož houses, the Vrata Valley with the remnants of an aqueduct for the cement works, Peričnik Falls, and the north face of Triglav.

== Notable people ==
Notable people that were born or lived in Mojstrana include:

- Mihael Ambrožič (1846–1904), beekeeper

== Gallery ==
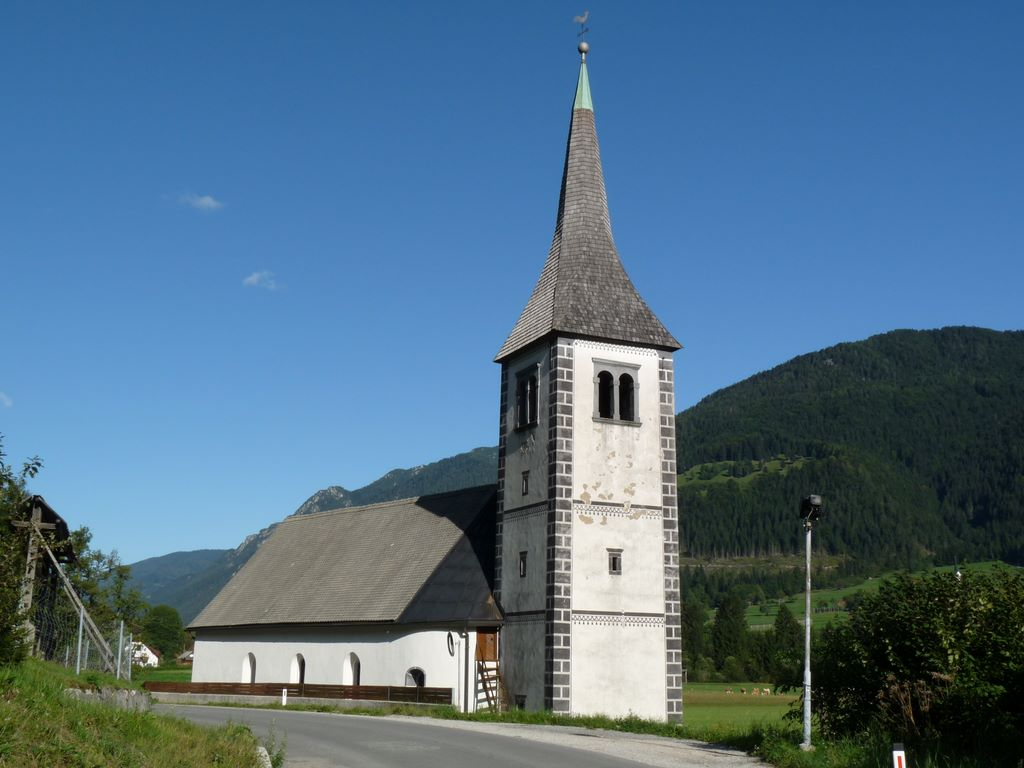
St. Clement's Church

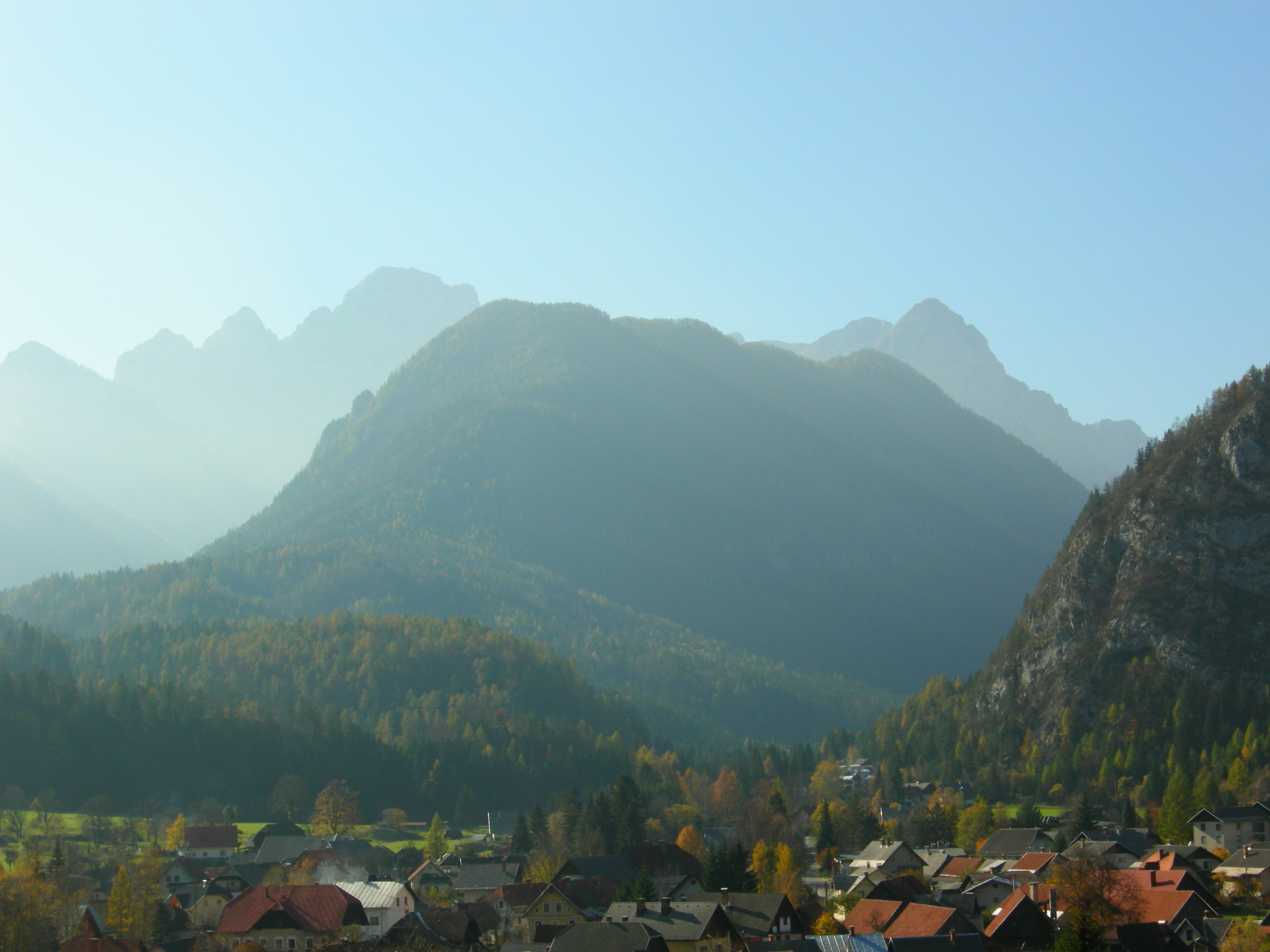
The hills around Mojstrana

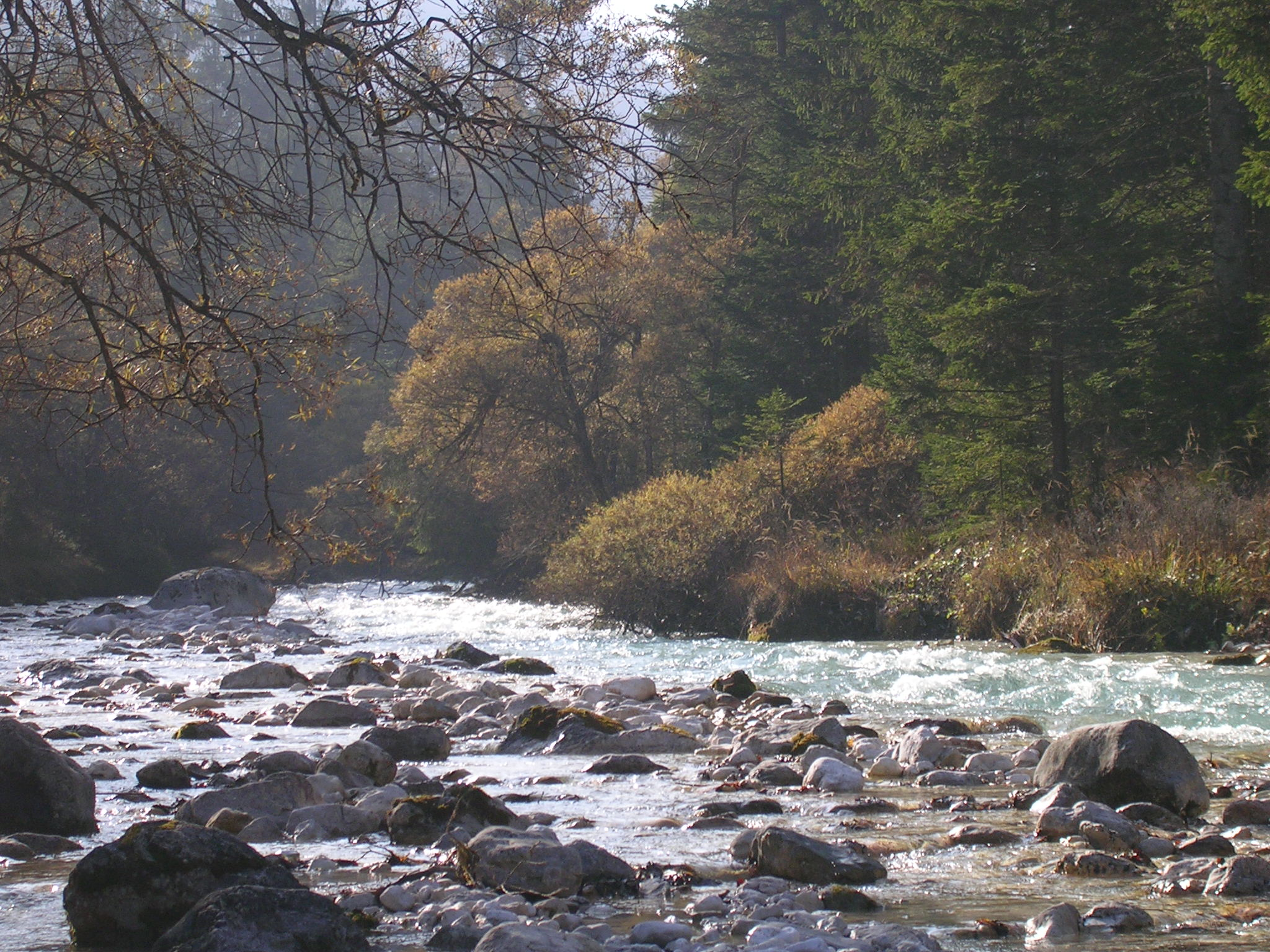
Bistrica Creek
