= Dolenja Nemška Vas =

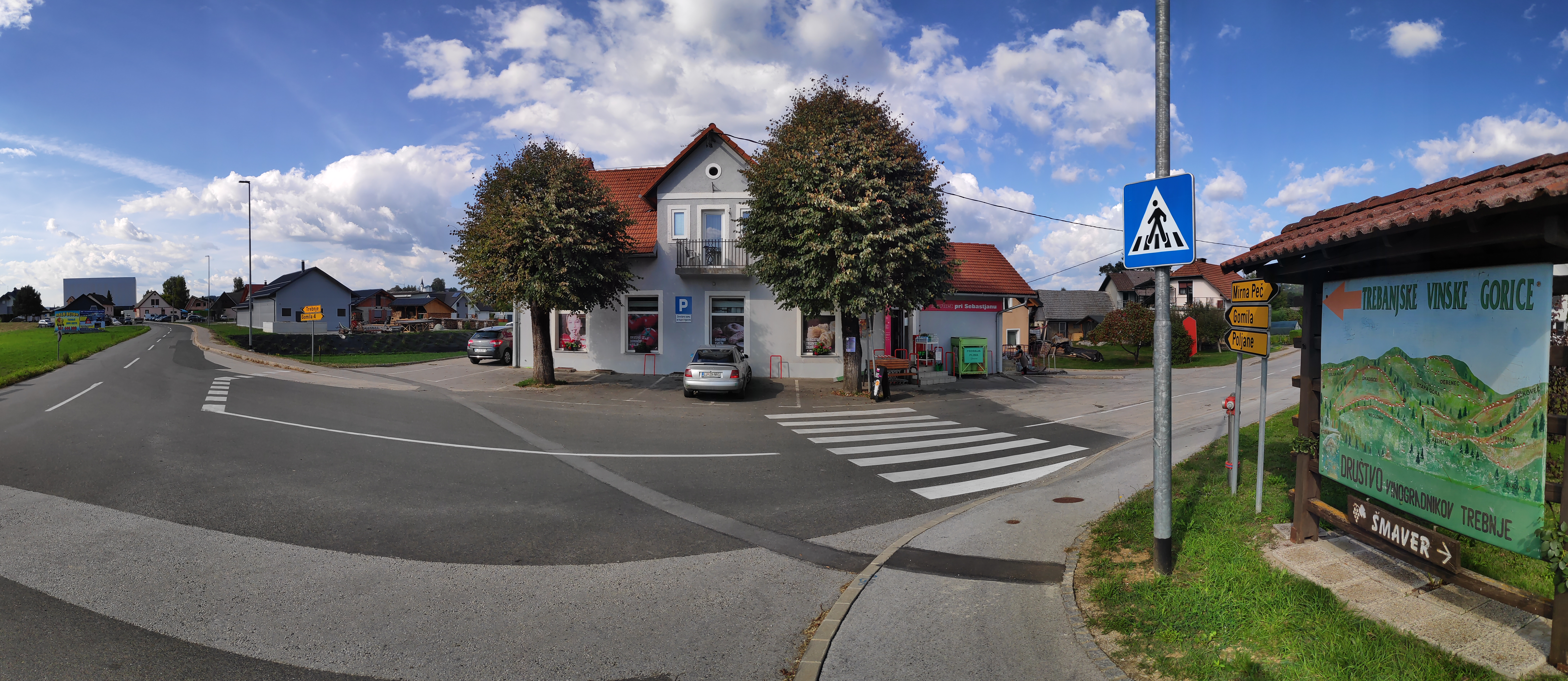

- Location in Slovenia
- Coordinates: 45°54′12.07″N 15°2′18.7″E
- Country: Slovenia
- Traditional region: Lower Carniola
- Statistical region: Southeast Slovenia
- Municipality: Trebnje

Area
  - Total: 1.49 km^{2} (0.58 sq mi)
- Elevation: 266.9 m (876 ft)

Population (2019)
  - Total: 276
- Time zone: UTC+1 (Central European Time)
  - Summer (DST): UTC+2 (Central European Summer Time)
- Postal code: 8210

Dolenja Nemška Vas (pronounced [dɔˈleːnja ˈneːmʃka ˈʋaːs]; Slovene: Dolenja Nemška vas) is a small settlement in the Municipality of Trebnje in eastern Slovenia. It lies on the left bank of the Temenica River, just east of Trebnje. The area is part of the traditional region of Lower Carniola. The municipality is now included in the Southeast Slovenia Statistical Region. As of 2019, the population in Dolenja Nemška Vas was 276 people, of which 156 (or around 56.5%) is male, while the other 120 (or around 43.5%) is female. The current president of the village is Rok Rajar.

== Name ==
The name Dolenja Nemška Vas literally means 'lower German village' and contrasts with Gorenja Nemška Vas (literally, 'upper German village') about 4 kilometers (2.5 mi) to the west, which is 35 meters (115 ft) higher in elevation. These names refer to former ethnic Germans living in the villages, mostly from Ortenburg in Bavaria.
