= Vintgar Gorge =

Natural gorge in Slovenia

Coordinates: 46.390°N 14.083°E

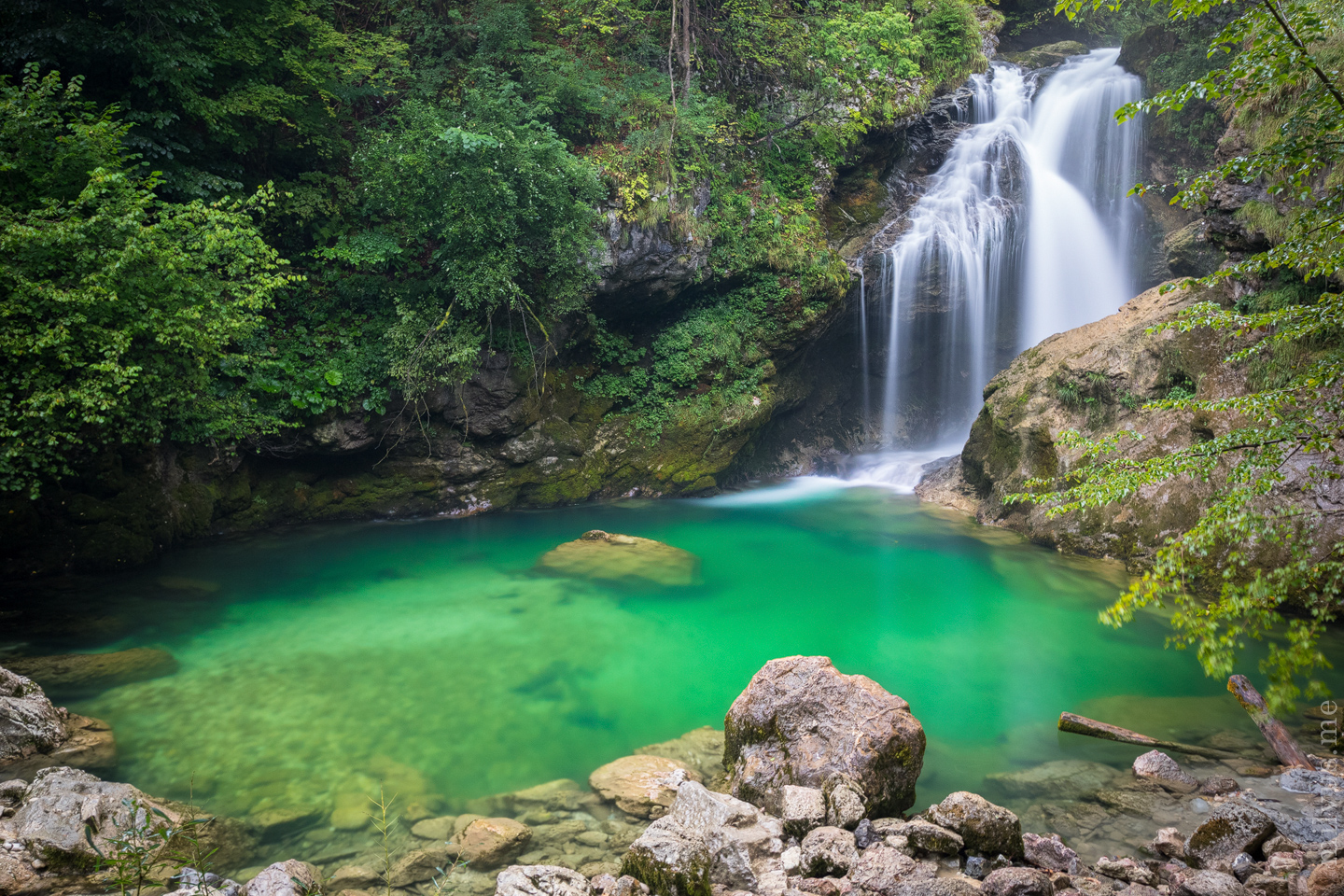
Šum Falls of the Radovna River flowing through the Vintgar Gorge

Vintgar Gorge (Slovene: soteska Vintgar) or Bled Gorge (Blejski vintgar) is a 1.6-kilometer (0.99 mi) gorge in northwestern Slovenia in the municipalities of Gorje and Bled, four kilometers northwest of Bled. It is located on the edge of Triglav National Park. Carved by the Radovna River, it is the continuation of the Radovna Valley. The sheer canyon walls are 50 to 100 meters (160 to 330 ft) high, with a total slope measuring about 250 m (820 ft). The stream has created many erosive features such as pools and rapids, and terminates in the picturesque 13 m (43 ft) Šum Falls (literally, 'noisy falls'), the largest river waterfall in Slovenia.

== History ==
Video of Žumer Galleries

Until 1890, the gorge was mainly inaccessible, except for two points at which the Radovna could be reached, and a bridge over Šum Falls was already built in 1878. The rest of the gorge was explored in 1891 by the mayor of Gorje, Jakob Žumer, and by Benedikt Lergetporer, a prominent photographer of the era.

In 1893 the gorge was equipped with wooden observation walkways and bridges with great effort and was opened to the public on August 26, 1893. The walkways, which were later named Žumer Galleries (Žumrove galerije) in the most prominent part of the gorge, have been renovated several times since.

A hydroelectric dam has also been built below the gorge and an arch railway bridge for the Bohinj Railway. The bridge, built in 1904 and 1905 of cut stone, is the largest stone arch railway bridge preserved in its entirety in Slovenia. It is 65 m (213 ft) long, 4.5 m (15 ft) wide and 33 m (108 ft) high.

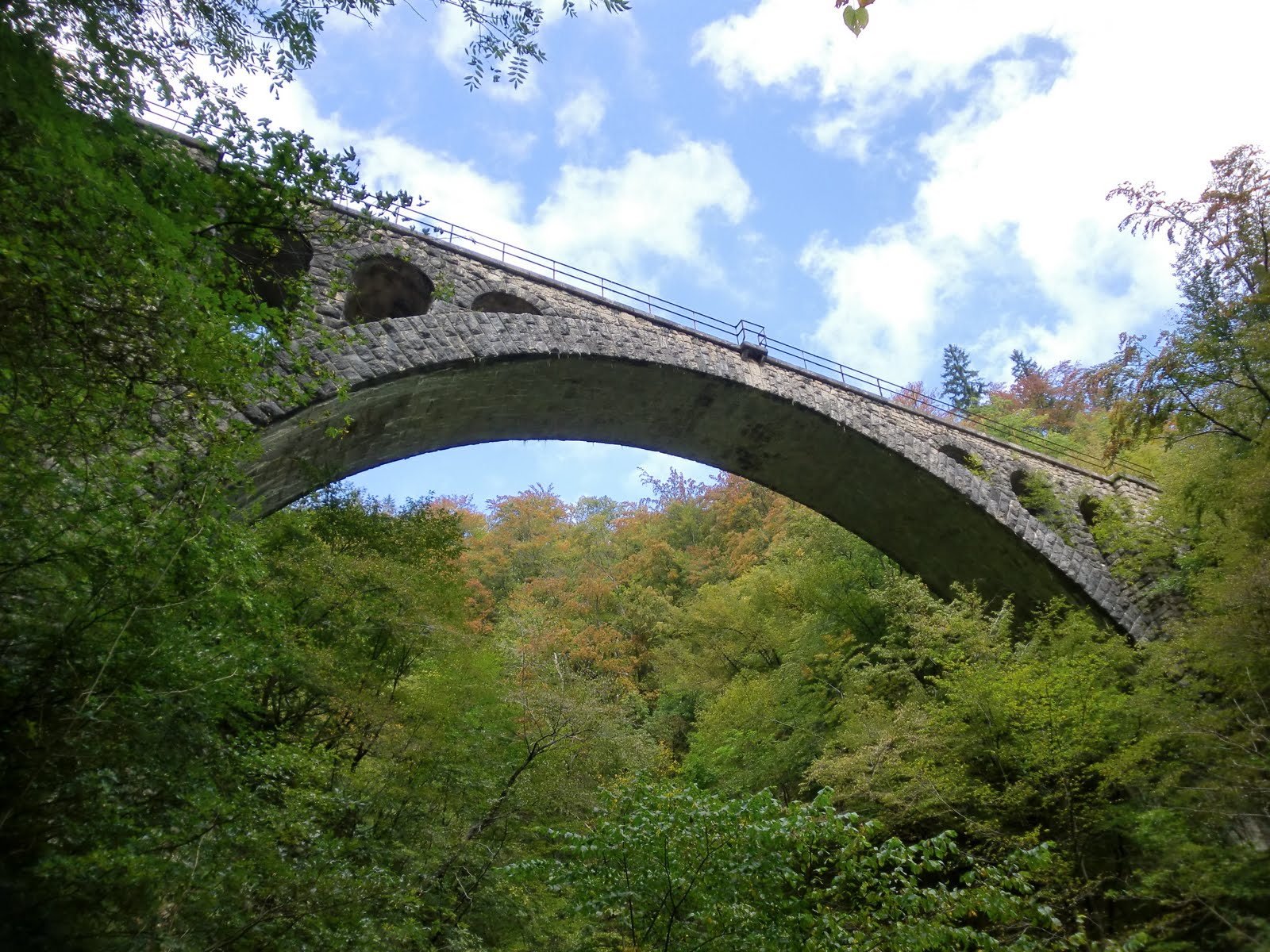
Stone arch railway bridge over the Radovna

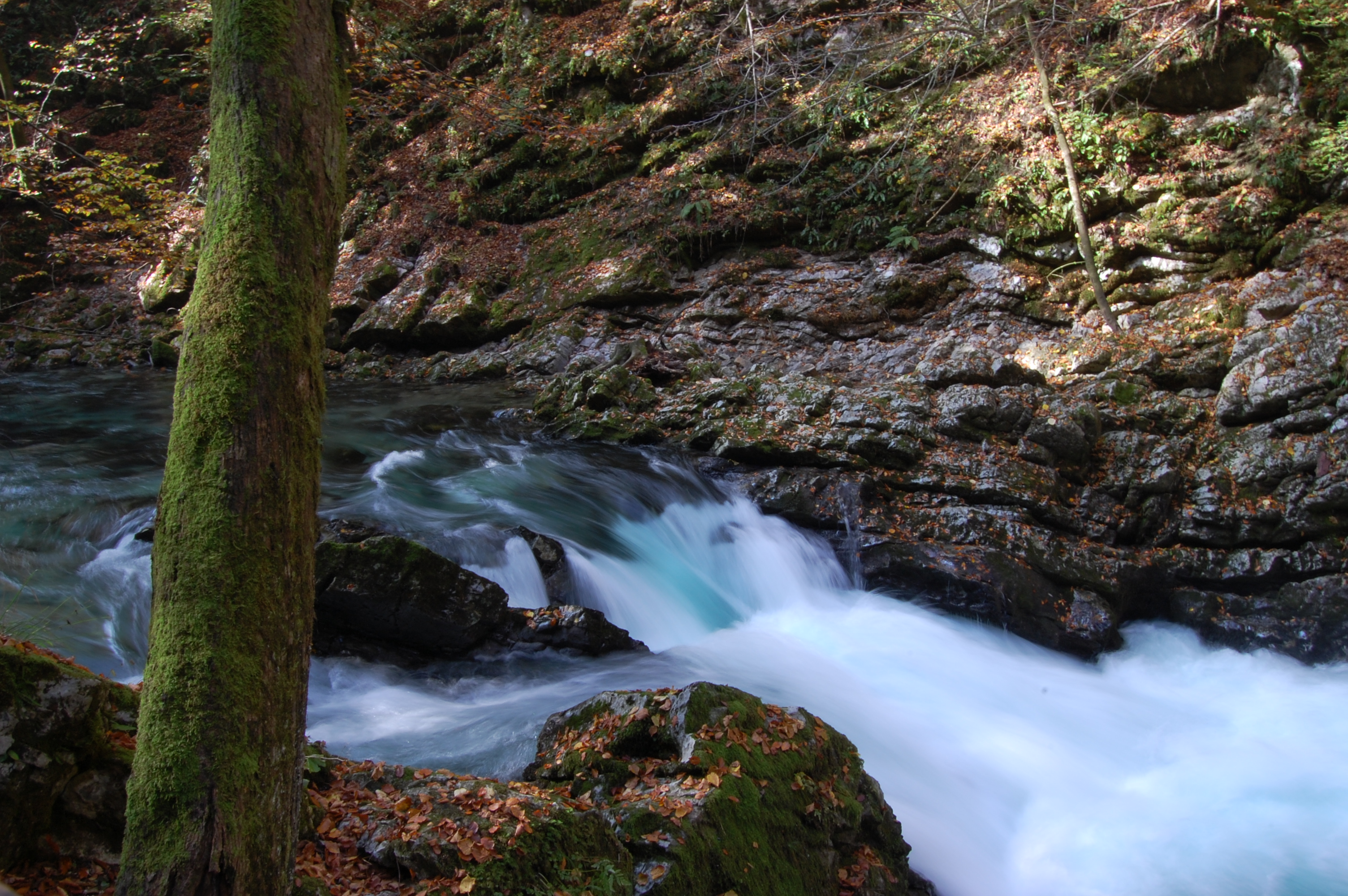
Rapids in the upper Vintgar Gorge

== Name ==
The word vintgar is derived from German Windegg(er) 'place exposed to the wind' via the hamlet of Vintgar at the head of the gorge in the village of Podhom. Another explanation claims that it derives from the German name Weingarten 'vineyard', referring to vineyards in Podhom or to the gorge resembling a wine glass in shape. As the first mountain gorge in the area to be made accessible to tourists, the word vintgar has been generalized in Slovene to refer to other scenic, protected gorges, e.g. the Iška Gorge (Iški vintgar), the Bistrica Gorge (Bistriški vintgar) on Pohorje, and the Ribnica Gorge (Ribniški vintgar) in Bohinj.

== Geology ==
Before the last ice age, the Radovna River flowed eastward. After being dammed by the ice and detritus of the Bohinj Glacier, the resulting lake cut a new path northeast through a soft layer of Triassic limestone between the hills Boršt (931 m or 3,054 ft) and Hom (844 m or 2,769 ft), towards the Upper Sava Valley.
