= Cerkljanska Dobrava =

Cerkljanska Dobrava Dobrava (until 1952)
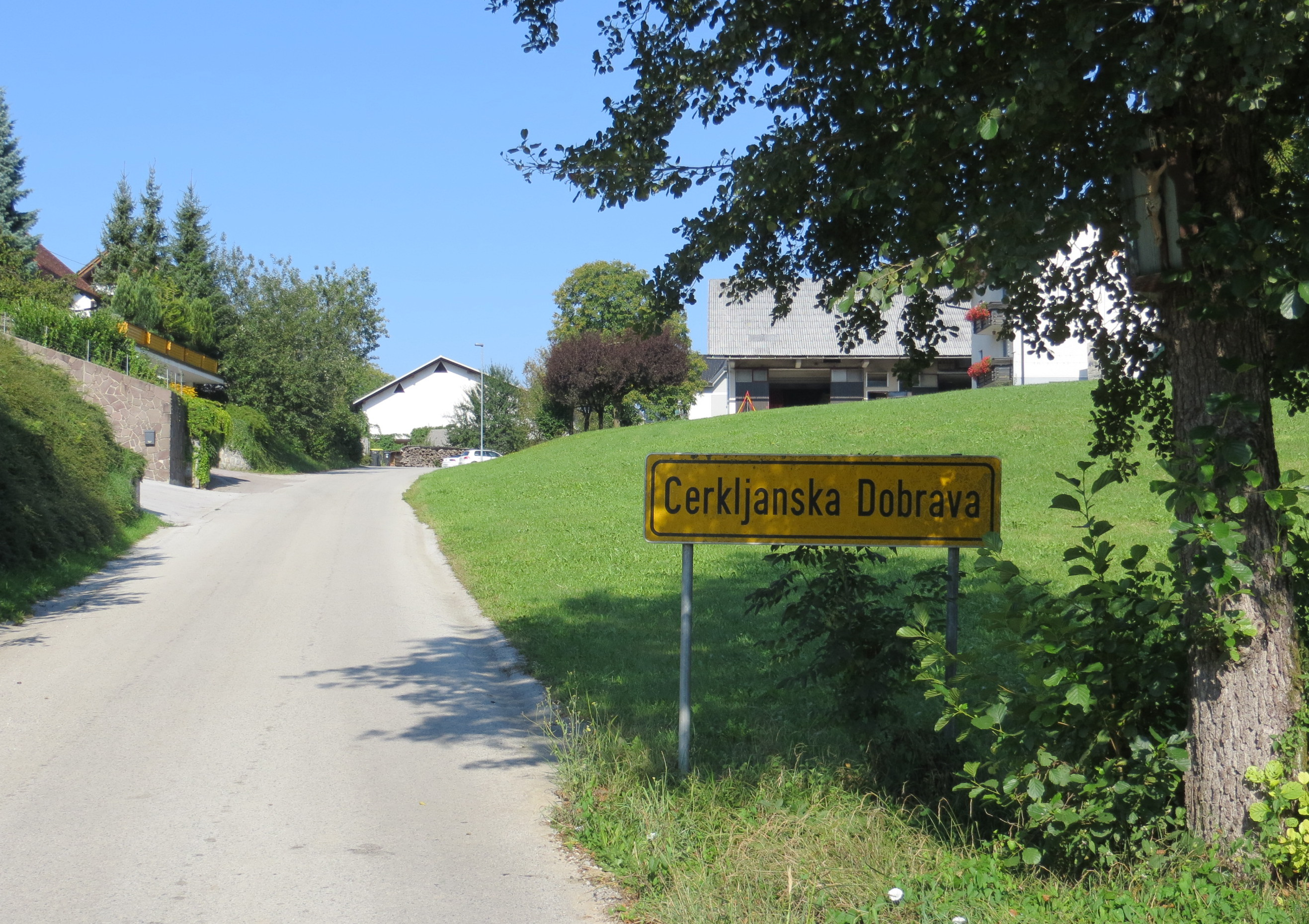

- Location in Slovenia
- Coordinates: 46°13′58.85″N 14°32′22.11″E
- Country: Slovenia
- Traditional Region: Upper Carniola
- Statistical region: Upper Carniola
- Municipality: Cerklje na Gorenjskem
- Elevation: 372.9 m (1,223 ft)

Population (2020)
  - Total: 84

Cerkljanska Dobrava (pronounced [tsɛɾˈkljaːnska dɔˈbɾaːʋa]; German: Dobrawa bei Zirklach) is a small settlement in the Municipality of Cerklje na Gorenjskem in the Upper Carniola region of Slovenia.

== Name ==
The name of the settlement was changed from Dobrava to Cerkljanska Dobrava in 1952. In the past the German name was Dobrawa bei Zirklach.

== See also ==
Dobrava (toponym)
