= Kot (valley) =

Valley in Slovenia

Coordinates: 46°24′22.12″N 13°53′21.46″E

Kot ("corner)" in Slovenian) is an alpine valley in the Julian Alps in the Upper Carniola region, northwestern Slovenia, wholly within Triglav National Park.

Kot is one of three glacial alpine valleys near Mojstrana, the others being Vrata and Krma. It is the starting point for many routes through the Triglav National Park area and one of the easier and faster routes up Mount Triglav. It leads into the Radovna Valley.
