= Dobrava, Ormož =

Dobrava
- Location in Slovenia
- Coordinates: 46°25′33.45″N 16°8′45.76″E
- Country: Slovenia
- Traditional region: Styria
- Statistical region: Drava
- Municipality: Ormož

Area
  - Total: 2.65 km^{2} (1.02 sq mi)
- Elevation: 245 m (804 ft)

Population (2002)
  - Total: 130

Dobrava (pronounced [ˈdoːbɾaʋa]) is a settlement immediately north of the town of Ormož in northeastern Slovenia. The area belongs to the traditional region of Styria and is now included in the Drava Statistical Region.

== See also ==
- Dobrava (toponym)
