= Velika Dobrava =

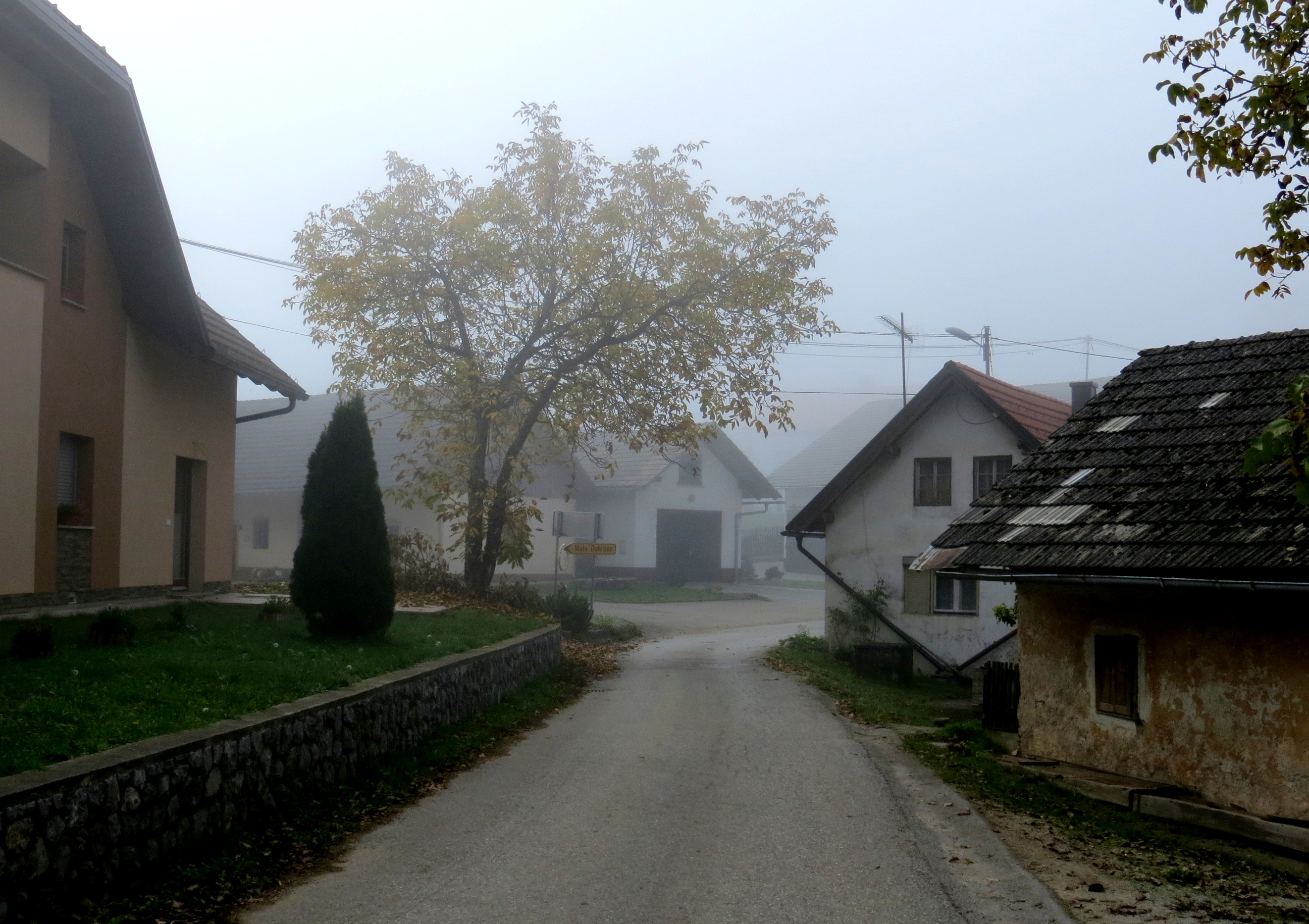

- Location in Slovenia
- Coordinates: 45°57′24.03″N 14°46′23.98″E
- Country: Slovenia
- Traditional region: Lower Carniola
- Statistical region: Central Slovenia
- Municipality: Ivančna Gorica

Area
  - Total: 1.39 km^{2} (0.54 sq mi)
- Elevation: 468.8 m (1,538 ft)

Population (2002)
  - Total: 103

Velika Dobrava (pronounced [ˈʋeːlika dɔˈbɾaːʋa]; German: Oberdobrawa) is a village east of Višnja Gora in the Municipality of Ivančna Gorica in central Slovenia. The area is part of the historical region of Lower Carniola. The municipality is now included in the Central Slovenia Statistical Region.

== Name ==
The name Velika Dobrava literally means 'big Dobrava', contrasting with neighboring Mala Dobrava, literally 'little Dobrava'. The place name Dobrava is relatively frequent in Slovenia. It is derived from the Slovene common noun dobrava 'gently rolling partially wooded land' (and archaically 'woods, grove'). The name therefore refers to the local geography.

== Church ==
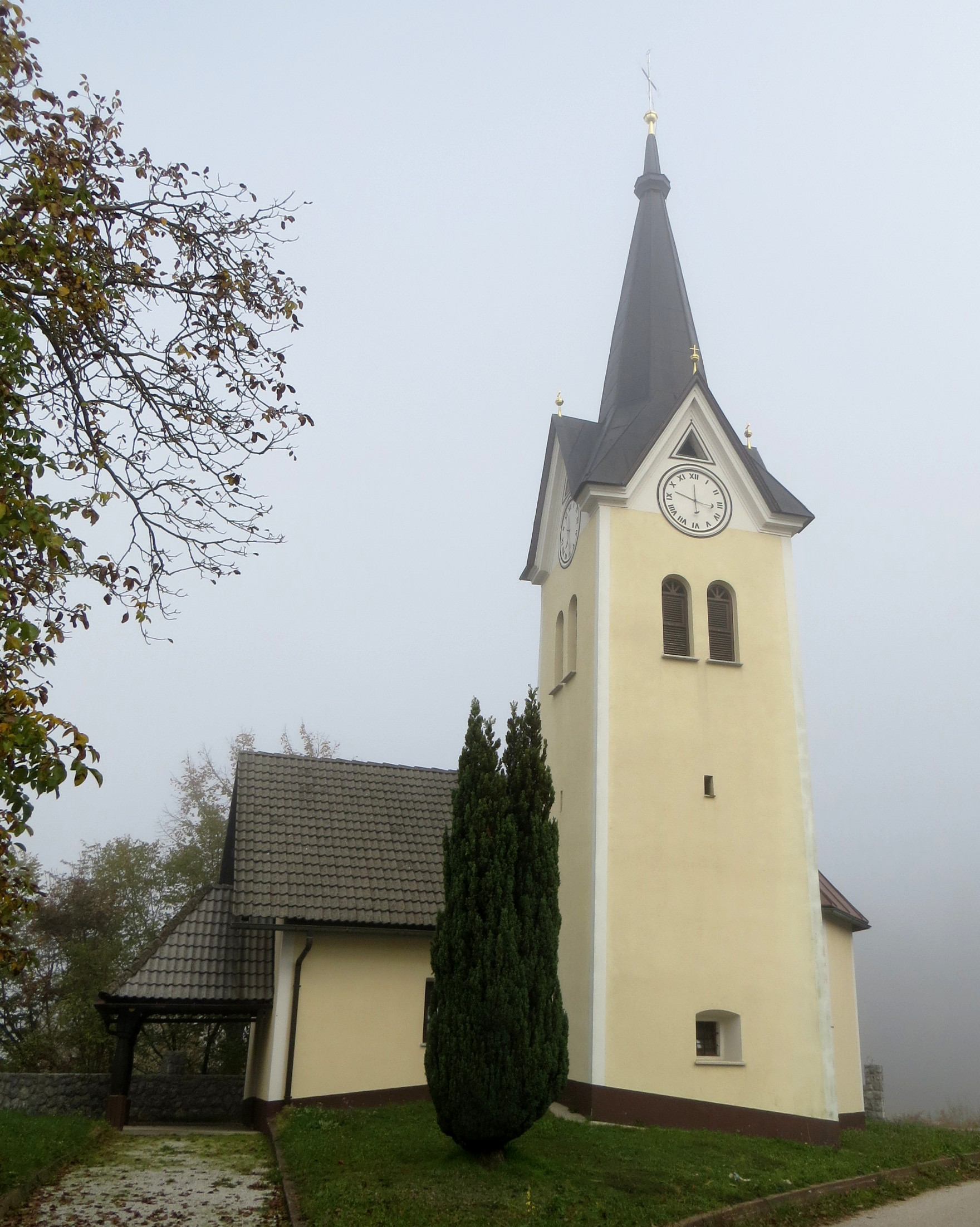
Saint James's Church

The local church is dedicated to Saint James (Slovene: sveti Jakob) and belongs to the Parish of Višnja Gora. It was first mentioned in written documents dating to 1507.
