= Dobrava pri Stični =

Dobrava pri Stični Dobrava (until 1955)
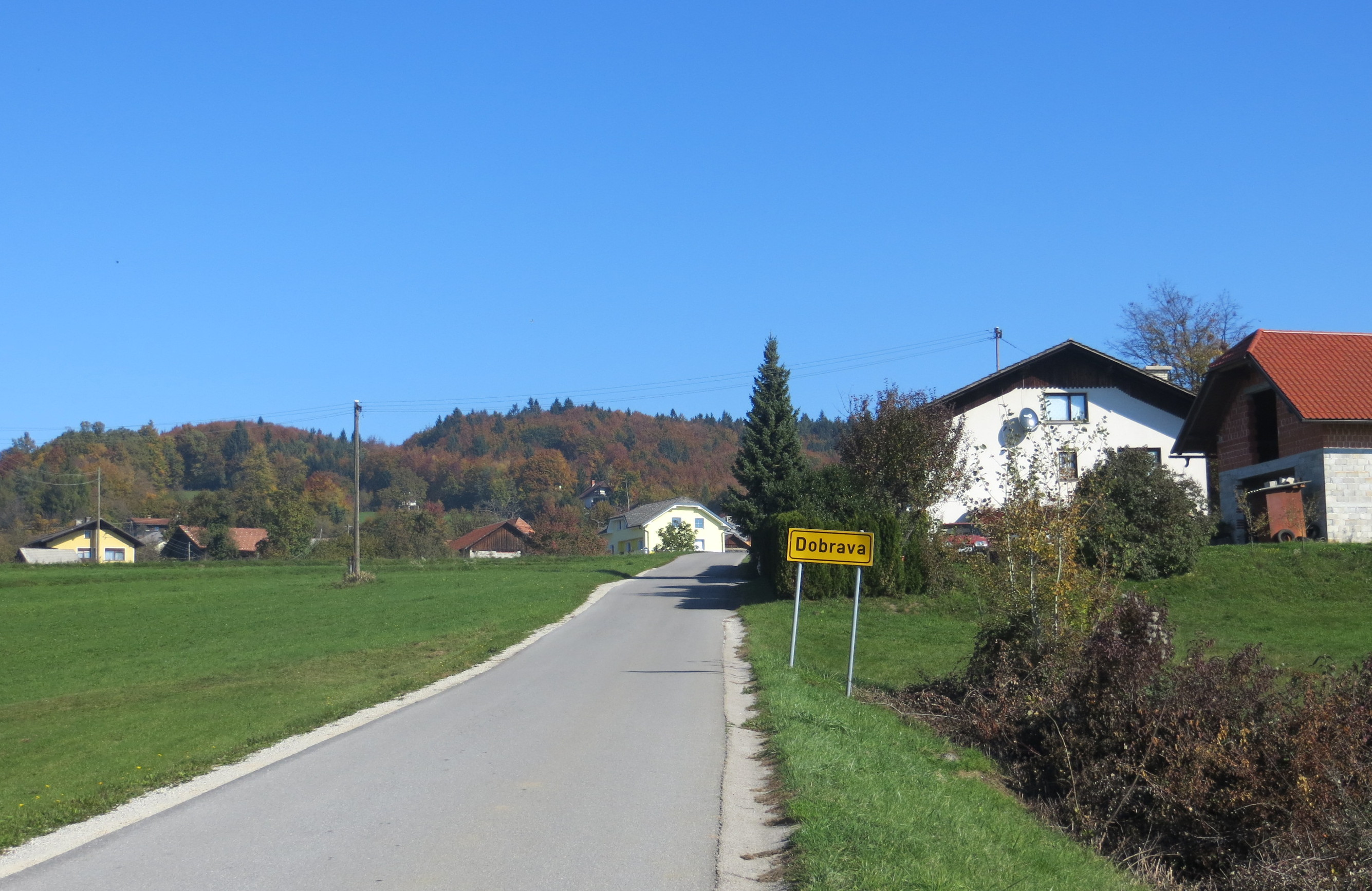

- Location in Slovenia
- Coordinates: 45°58′37.54″N 14°49′16.51″E
- Country: Slovenia
- Traditional region: Lower Carniola
- Statistical region: Central Slovenia
- Municipality: Ivančna Gorica

Area
  - Total: 1.3 km^{2} (0.50 sq mi)
- Elevation: 568.5 m (1,865 ft)

Population (2002)
  - Total: 44

Dobrava pri Stični (pronounced [dɔˈbɾaːʋa pɾi ˈstiːtʃni]) is a settlement northeast of Stična in the Municipality of Ivančna Gorica in central Slovenia. The area is part of the historical region of Lower Carniola. The municipality is now included in the Central Slovenia Statistical Region.

== Name ==
The name of the settlement was changed from Dobrava to Dobrava pri Stični in 1955.

== Cultural heritage ==
A small roadside chapel south of the settlement is dedicated to the Virgin Mary and was built in the early 20th century.
