= Postal codes in Slovenia =

Postal codes in Slovenia (Slovene: poštna številka) are numerical strings which form part of a postal address in Slovenia. The codes consist of four digits written without separator characters, the first digit represents the region and the last three digits represent the individual post office.

Postal code	Major city
1xxx	Ljubljana
2xxx	Maribor
3xxx	Celje
4xxx	Kranj
5xxx	Nova Gorica
6xxx	Koper
8xxx	Novo Mesto
9xxx	Murska Sobota

See Also
