= Mežakla =

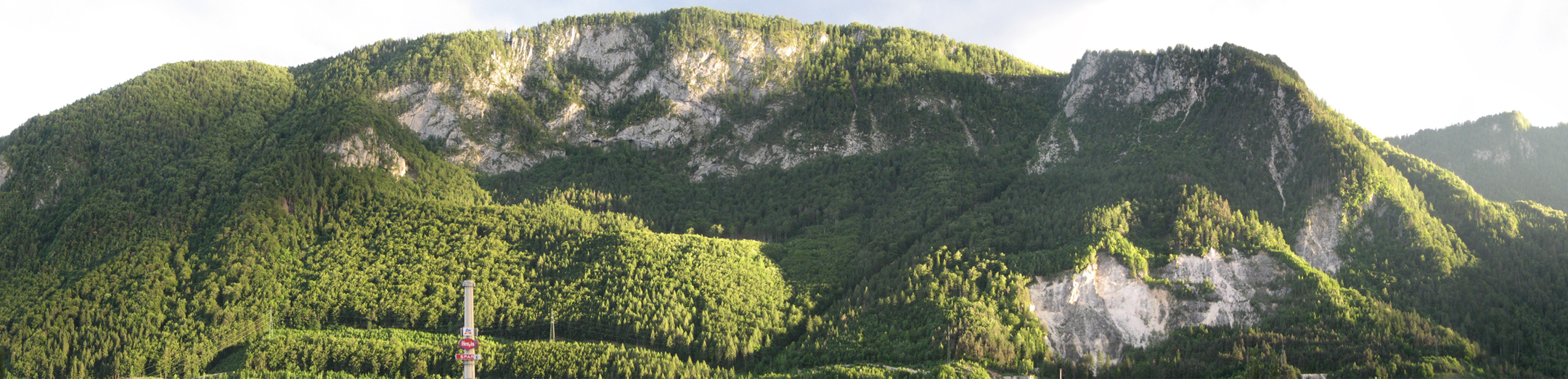
- View of Mežakla from Jesenice

Highest point
- Elevation: 1,348 m (4,423 ft)
- Coordinates: 46°24′06″N 14°02′27″E

Geography
- Location within Slovenia
- Location: Slovenia
- Parent range: Julian Alps

Mežakla (pronounced [mɛˈʒaːkla]) is a long undulating plateau about 15 km (9 mi) long in the foothills of the Julian Alps above the town of Jesenice in northwestern Slovenia. It ranges from approximately 1,200 m (3,900 ft) to 1,593 m (5,226 ft) high. It is mostly covered with spruce and beech trees. There are many pastures and clear streams on the plateau. Mežakla is part of Triglav National Park but tourism is underdeveloped.

== Name ==
The name Mežakla was first attested in written sources as Moshägkhlä in 1579 (and as Musakhla in 1609 and Meſaqua in 1744). The name is derived from the dialect word mežek 'juvenile bear'.
