= Dobrava ob Krki =

Dobrava ob Krki Dobrava (until 1953)
- Location in Slovenia
- Coordinates: 45°51′53.85″N 15°29′24.66″E
- Country: Slovenia
- Traditional region: Lower Carniola
- Statistical region: Lower Sava
- Municipality: Krško

Area
  - Total: 1.58 km^{2} (0.61 sq mi)
- Elevation: 171 m (561 ft)

Population (2002)
  - Total: 95
- Postal code: 8312

Dobrava ob Krki (pronounced [dɔˈbɾaːʋa ɔp ˈkəɾki]) is a small village on the right bank of the Krka River east of Podbočje in the Municipality of Krško in eastern Slovenia. The area is part of the traditional region of Lower Carniola. It is now included with the rest of the municipality in the Lower Sava Statistical Region.

== Name ==
The name of the settlement was changed from Dobrava to Dobrava ob Krki in 1953.
