= Spodnja Dobrava, Moravče =

Spodnja Dobrava
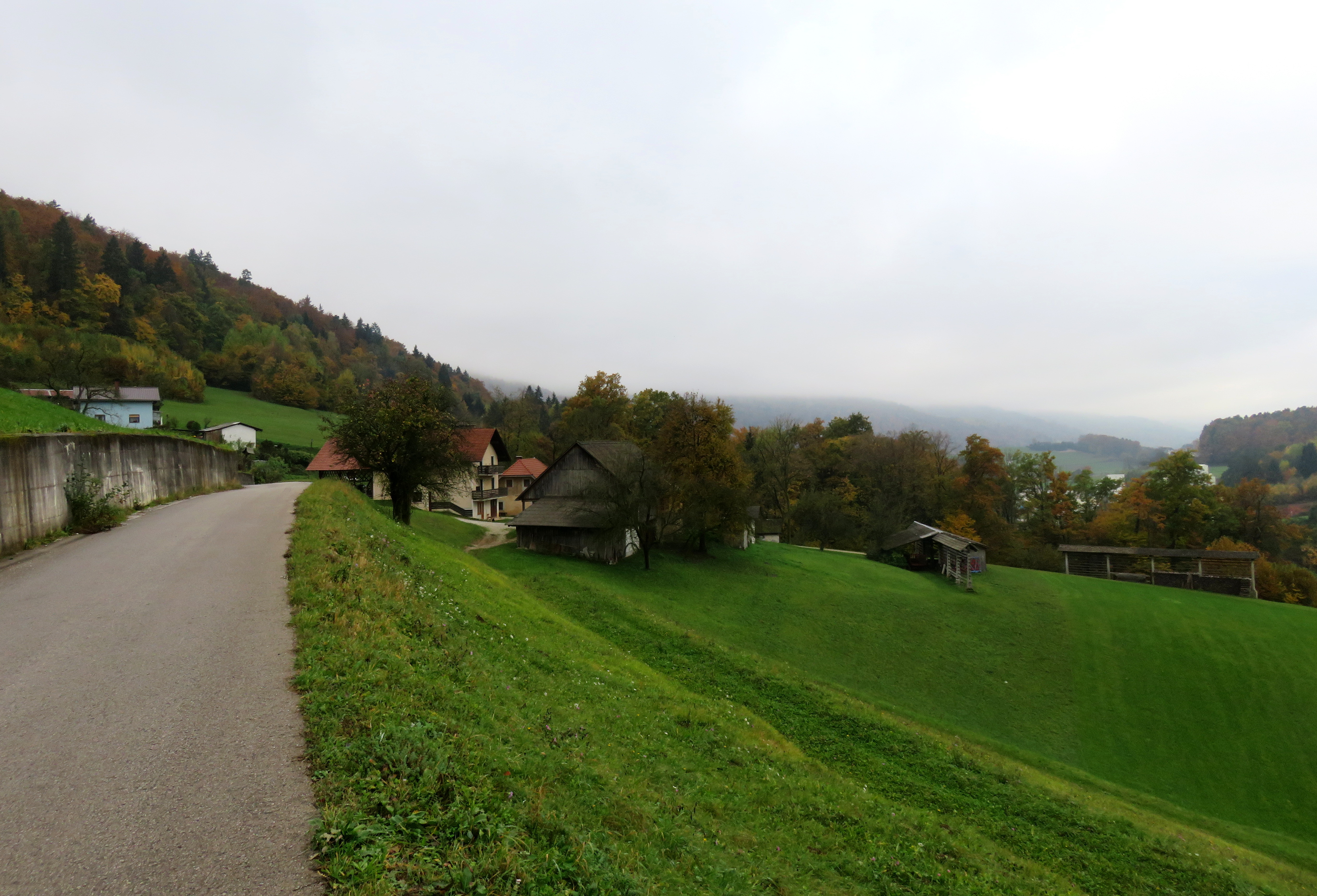

- Location in Slovenia
- Coordinates: 46°7′51.78″N 14°46′23.29″E
- Country: Slovenia
- Traditional region: Upper Carniola
- Statistical region: Central Slovenia
- Municipality: Moravče

Area
  - Total: 0.69 km^{2} (0.27 sq mi)
- Elevation: 417.9 m (1,371 ft)

Population (2002)
  - Total: 35
- Postal code: 1251

Spodnja Dobrava (pronounced [ˈspoːdnja dɔˈbɾaːʋa]) is a settlement east of Moravče in central Slovenia. The area is part of the traditional region of Upper Carniola. It is now included with the rest of the Municipality of Moravče in the Central Slovenia Statistical Region.

== Name ==
Spodnja Dobrava was attested in historical sources as Dobraw in 1386 and 1429.
