= Mala Dobrava =

Settlement in Lower Carniola, Slovenia

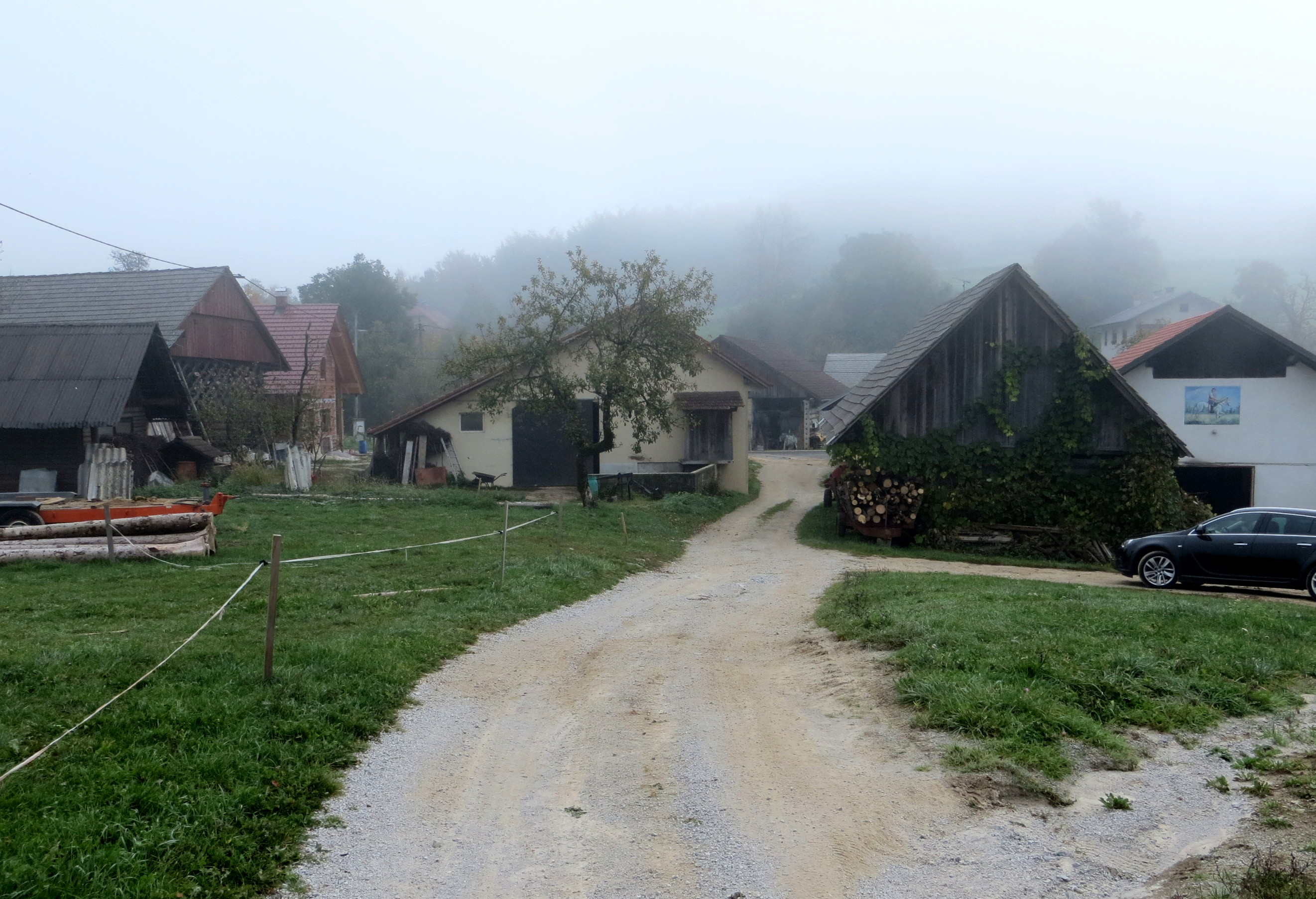

- Location in Slovenia
- Coordinates: 45°57′3.99″N 14°46′44.49″E
- Country: Slovenia
- Traditional region: Lower Carniola
- Statistical region: Central Slovenia
- Municipality: Ivančna Gorica

Area
  - Total: 0.58 km^{2} (0.22 sq mi)
- Elevation: 420.3 m (1,379 ft)

Population (2002)
  - Total: 38

Mala Dobrava (pronounced [ˈmaːla dɔˈbɾaːʋa]; German: Unterdobrawa) is a small settlement in the Municipality of Ivančna Gorica in central Slovenia. It lies in the hills northwest of Ivančna Gorica in the historical region of Lower Carniola. The municipality is now included in the Central Slovenia Statistical Region.

== Name ==
The name Mala Dobrava literally means 'little Dobrava', contrasting with neighboring Velika Dobrava, literally 'big Dobrava'. The place name Dobrava is relatively frequent in Slovenia. It is derived from the Slovene common noun dobrava 'gently rolling partially wooded land' (and archaically 'woods, grove'). The name therefore refers to the local geography.
