= Krma =

Valley in Slovenia

Coordinates: 46°24′1.99″N 13°55′25.21″E

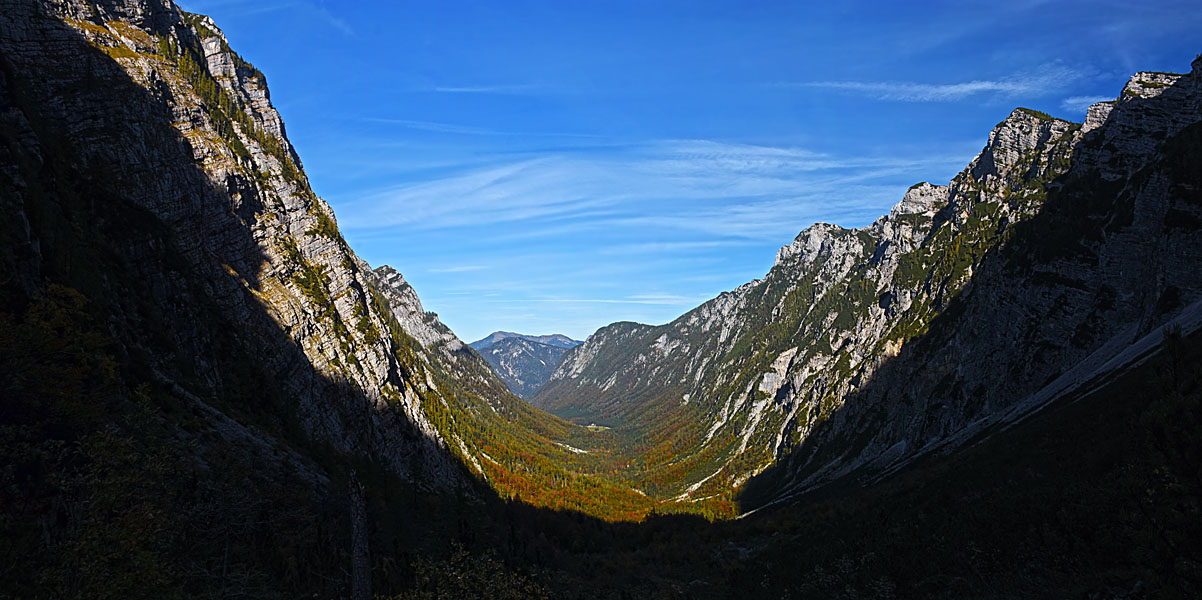
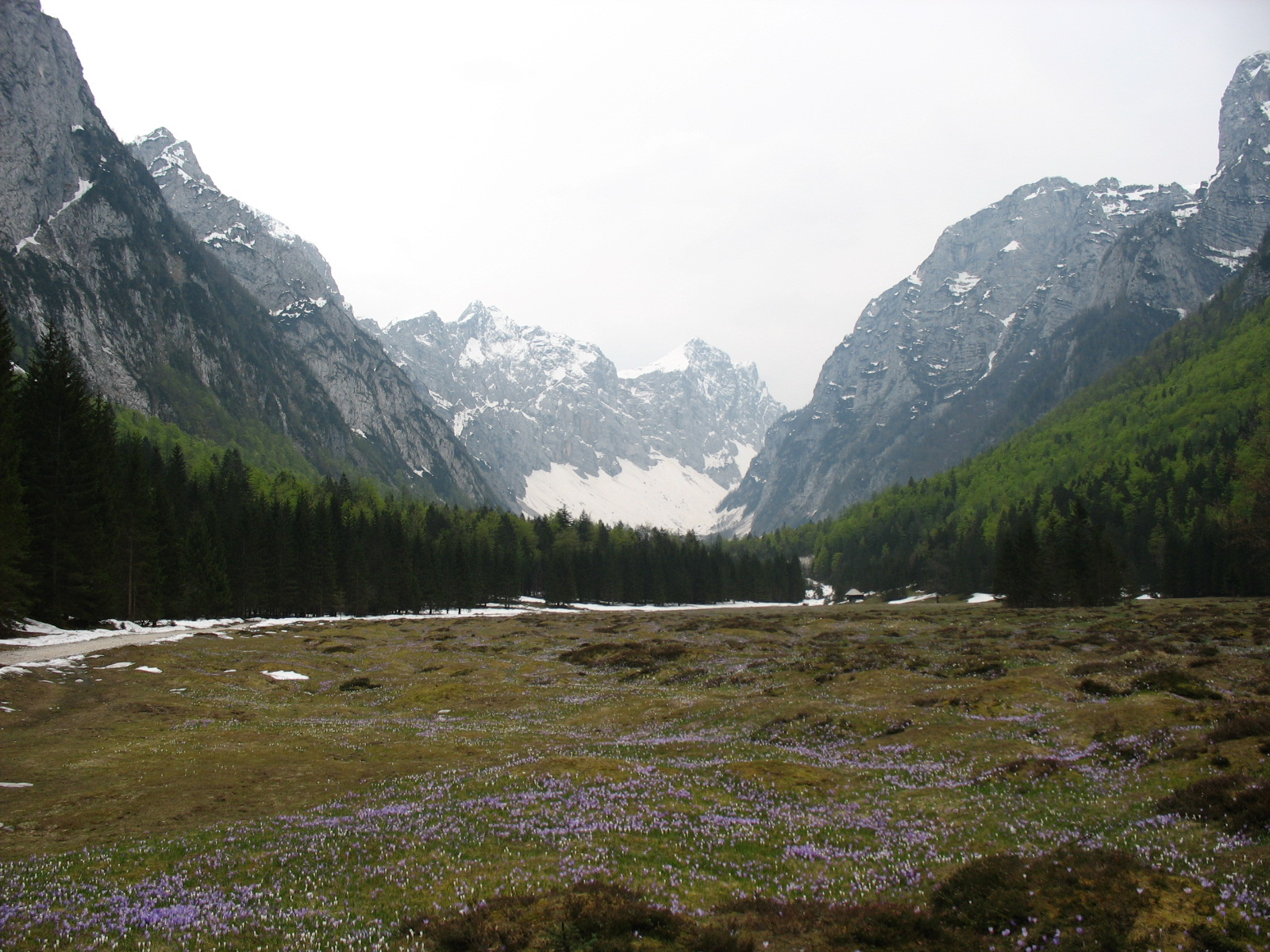

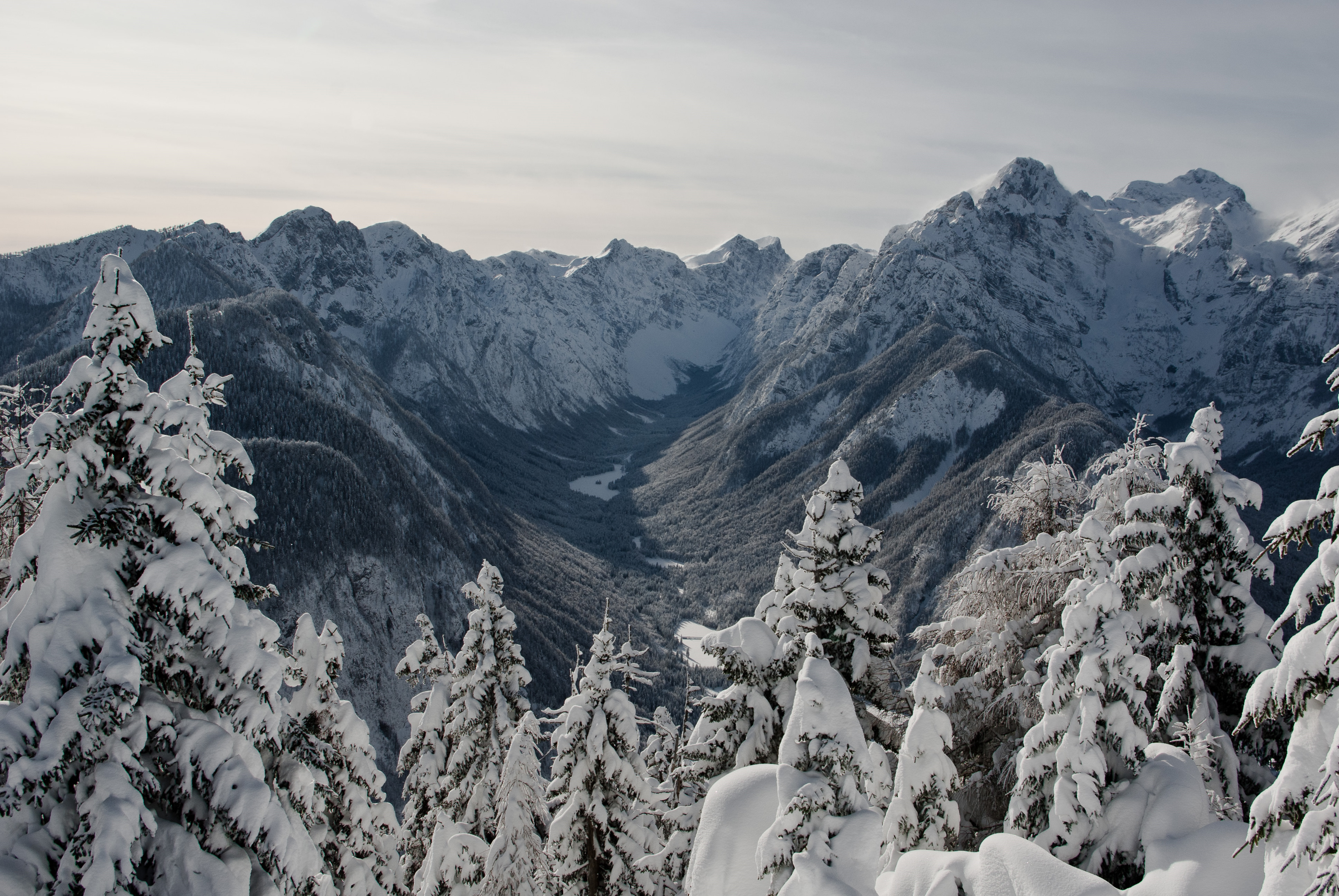
The Krma Valley from nearby Mount Jerebikovec in winter 2010

Krma is an alpine valley in the Julian Alps in the Upper Carniola region of northwestern Slovenia. The entire valley lies in Triglav National Park.

== Name ==
The name Krma is of uncertain origin, possibly derived from a substrate root such as *karma or *garma, which may be preserved in Istrian Romance karma 'rock crevice'; it is less likely to be related to Albanian karmë 'rocky hill'. It cannot be excluded that the name may also be connected with the Slovene common noun krma 'fodder' because of historical pasturing activity in the valley.

== Geography ==
Krma is the longest and easternmost of the glacial valleys near Mojstrana. It is the starting point for many routes through Triglav National Park. The lower northern end of the Krma Valley intersects with the upper western end of the Radovna Valley.

Approximately two-thirds of the way up the valley is the Kovinar alpine lodge (elevation: 892 meters or 2,927 feet) with 15 berths, a popular stopping point for hikers. This lodge was originally adapted from a shepherd's hut and opened in 1948. In 1959, a new larger lodge was built by workers from the Jesenice ironworks. It was renovated in 1983. It is open from the beginning of June until the end of September.

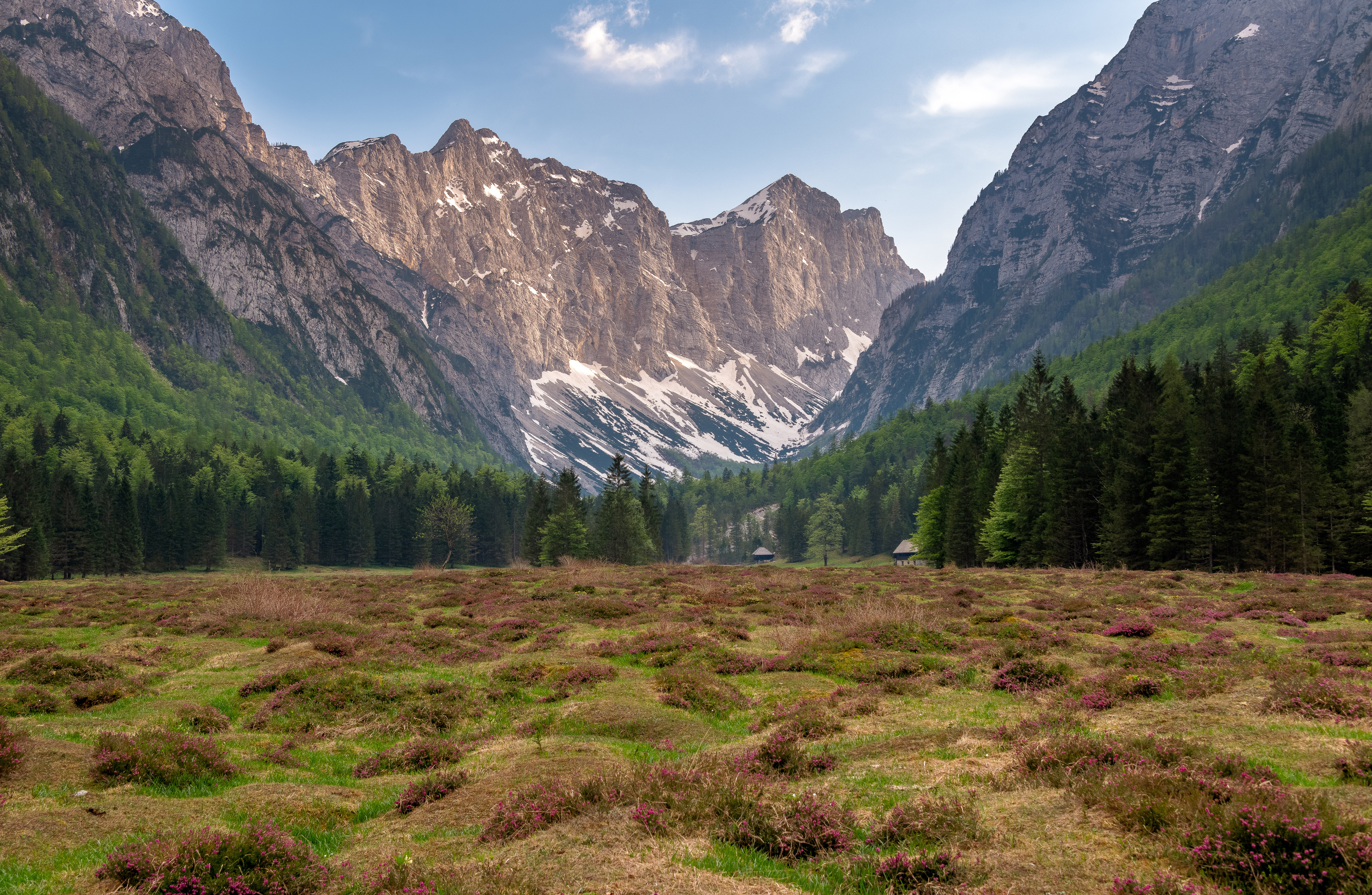
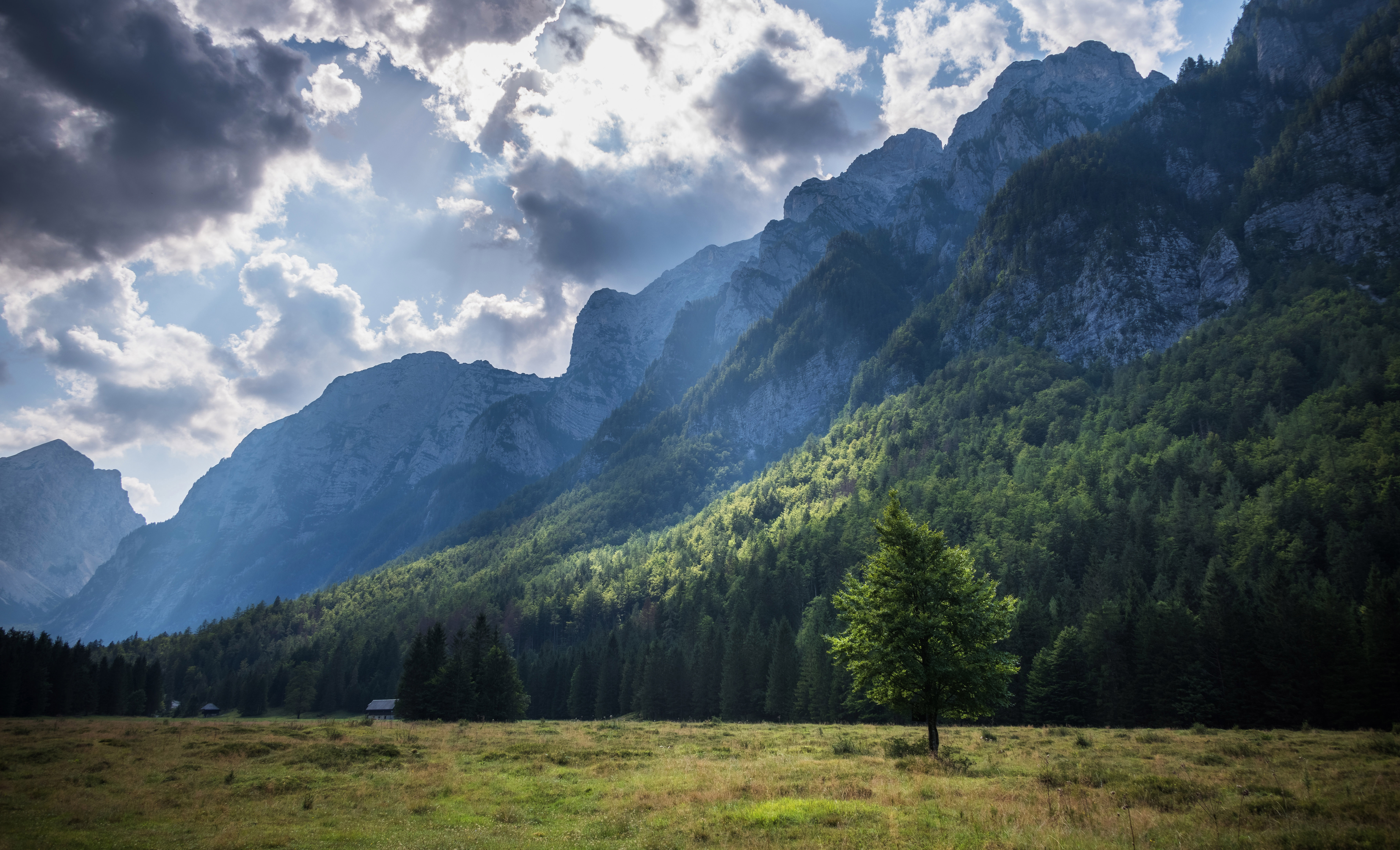
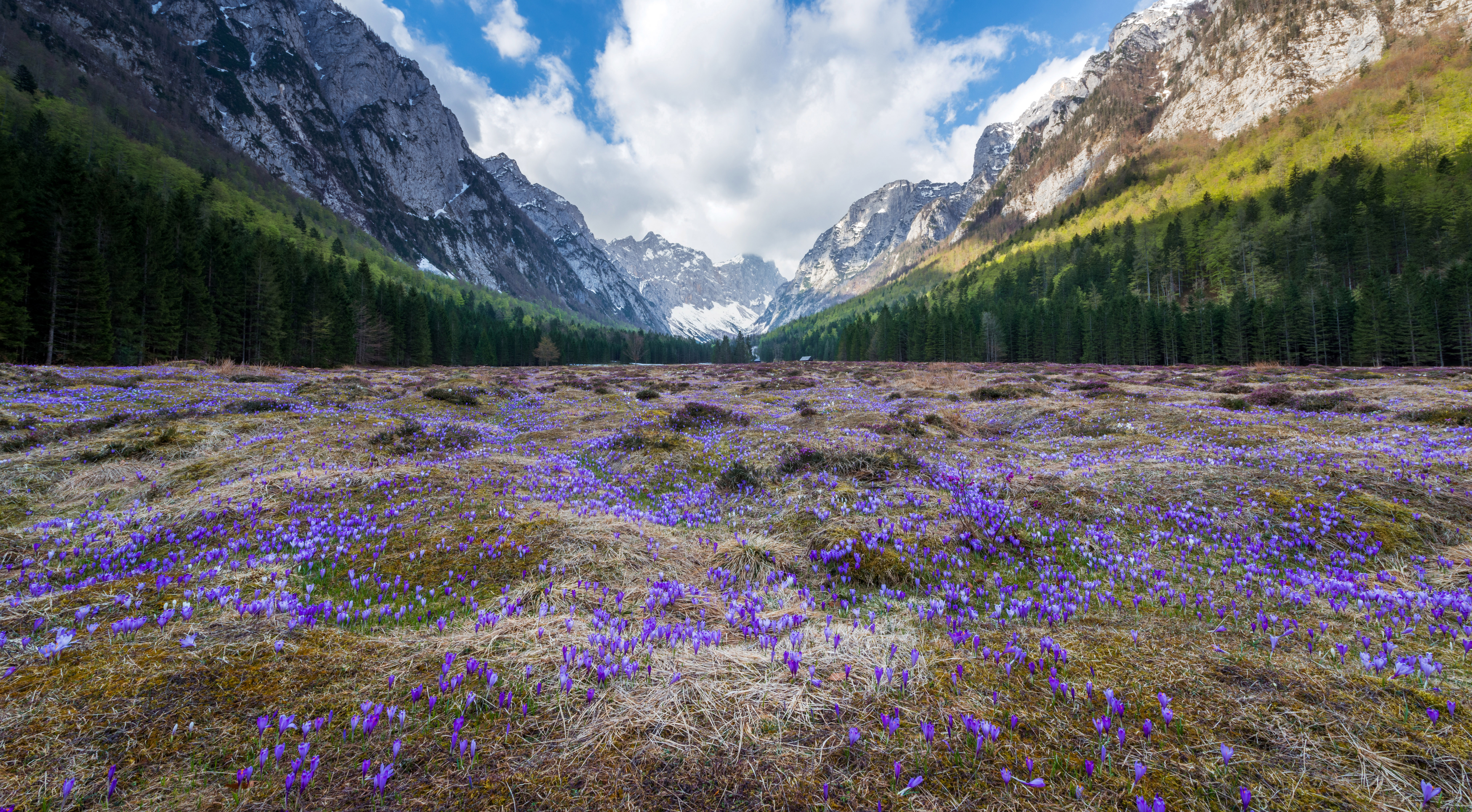

The following peaks surround Krma: toward the southeast Debela peč (elevation: 2,014 meters or 6,608 feet), Lipanski vrh (1,965 meters or 6,447 feet), Debeli vrh (1,962 meters or 6,437 feet), Mali Draški vrh (2,132 meters or 6,995 feet), Veliki Draški vrh (2,243 meters or 7,359 feet), and Tosc (2,275 meters or 7,464 feet); and toward the west Macesnovec (1,926 meters or 6,319 feet), Luknja peč (2,245 meters or 7,365 feet), and Rjavina (2,532 meters or 8,307 feet).
