= Dobrava, Trebnje =

Dobrava
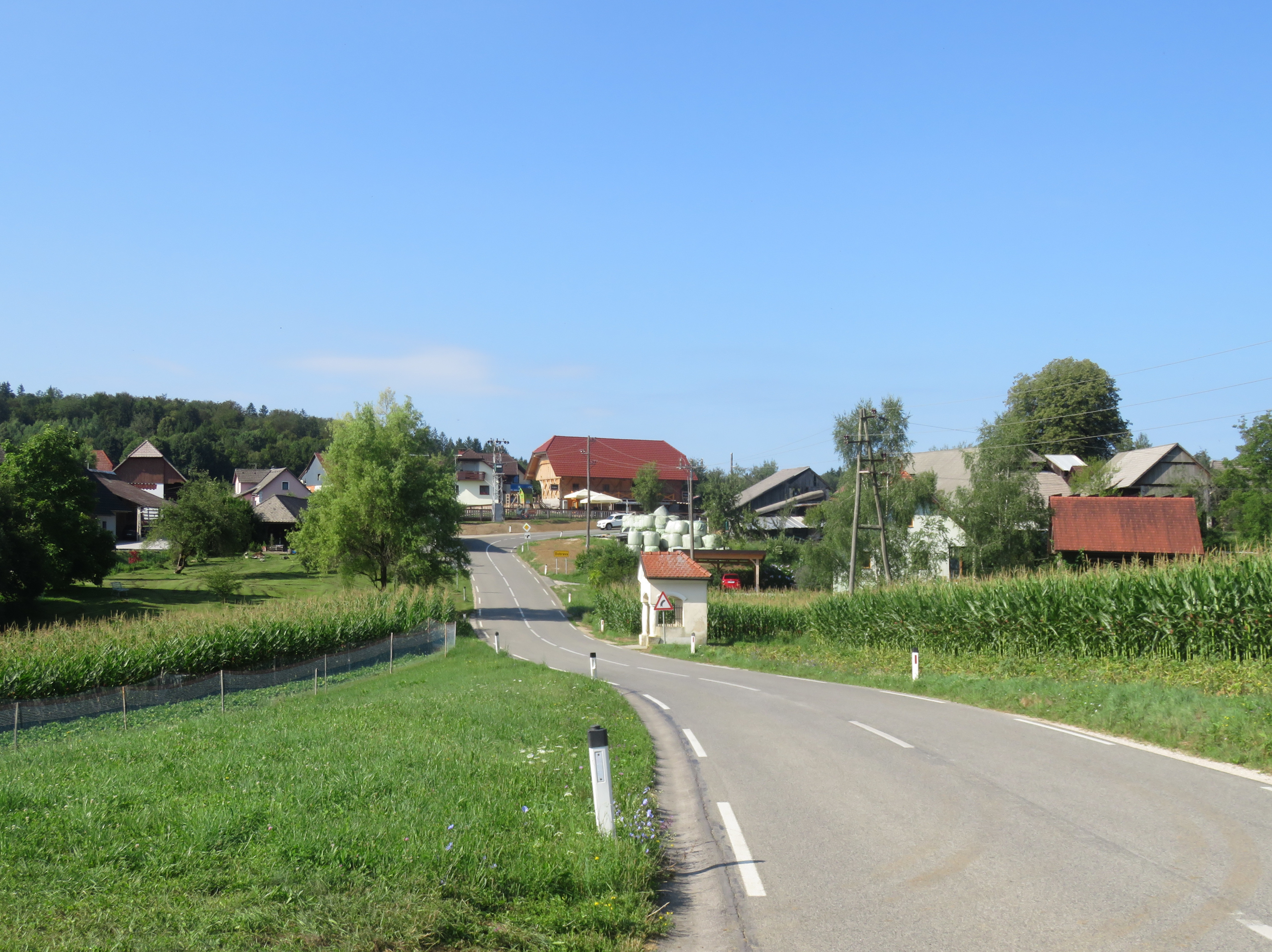

- Location in Slovenia
- Coordinates: 45°51′18.81″N 14°58′4.58″E
- Country: Slovenia
- Traditional region: Lower Carniola
- Statistical region: Southeast Slovenia
- Municipality: Trebnje

Area
  - Total: 3.17 km^{2} (1.22 sq mi)
- Elevation: 253.5 m (832 ft)

Population (2002)
  - Total: 75

Dobrava (pronounced [dɔˈbɾaːʋa]) is a nucleated village in the Municipality of Trebnje in eastern Slovenia. It lies on the southern edge of the municipality, northeast of Žužemberk. The area is part of the traditional region of Lower Carniola. The municipality is now included in the Southeast Slovenia Statistical Region.

== Church ==
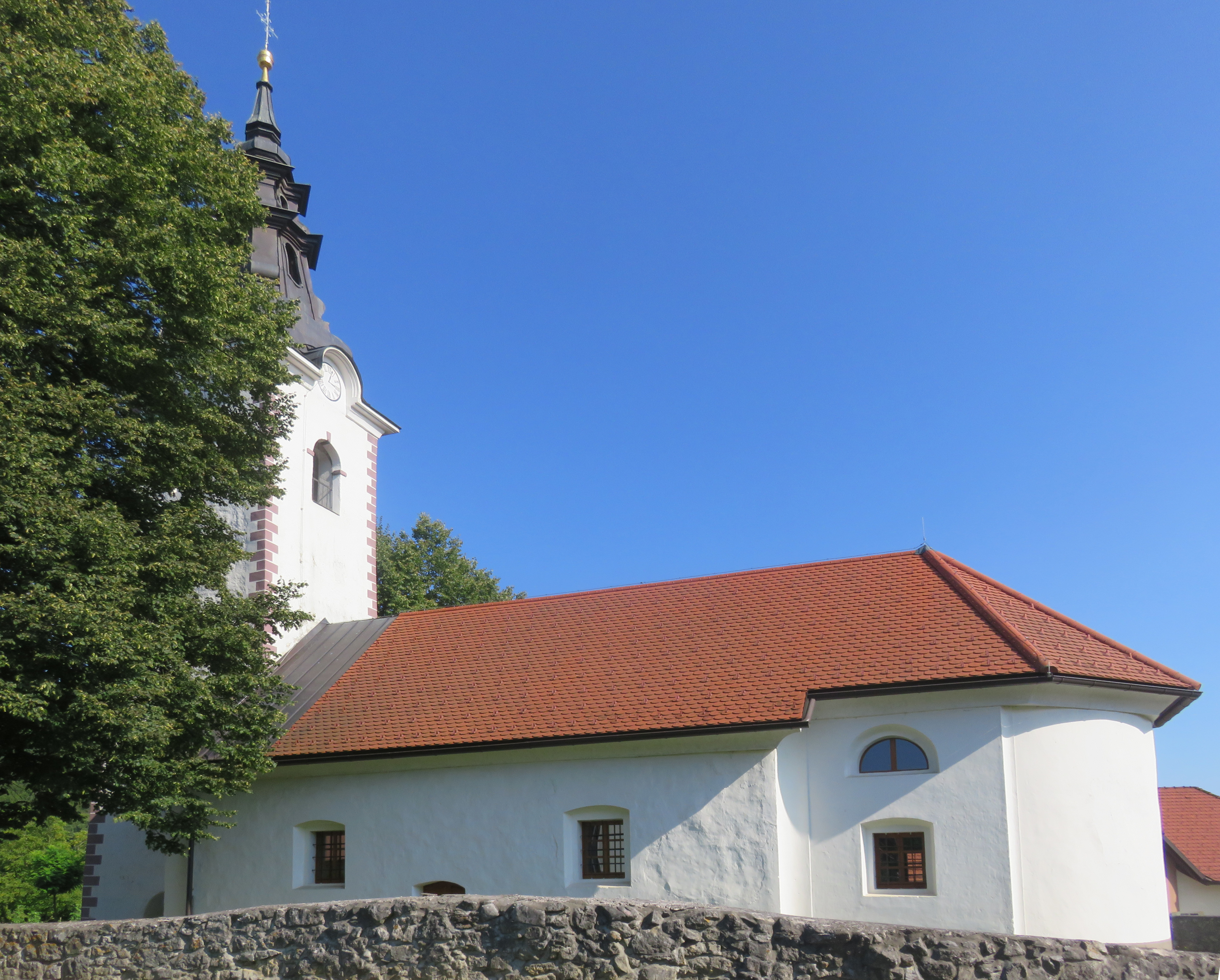
Saint Mary's Church

The local church is dedicated to Mary, Mother of God and belongs to the Parish of Dobrnič. It is a Gothic building with remnants of 14th-century frescos on the exterior walls. It was restyled in the Baroque in the second half of the 17th century.
