= Dolenja Dobrava, Trebnje =

Dolenja Dobrava
- Location in Slovenia
- Coordinates: 45°53′55.81″N 15°4′31.37″E
- Country: Slovenia
- Traditional region: Lower Carniola
- Statistical region: Southeast Slovenia
- Municipality: Trebnje

Area
  - Total: 1.15 km^{2} (0.44 sq mi)
- Elevation: 308.1 m (1,011 ft)

Population (2002)
  - Total: 62

Dolenja Dobrava (pronounced [dɔˈleːnja dɔˈbɾaːʋa]) is a small settlement in the Municipality of Trebnje in eastern Slovenia. The area is part of the traditional region of Lower Carniola. The entire municipality is now included in the Southeast Slovenia Statistical Region.
