= Gorenja Dobrava, Trebnje =

Gorenja Dobrava
- Location in Slovenia
- Coordinates: 45°54′42.18″N 15°2′56.77″E
- Country: Slovenia
- Traditional region: Lower Carniola
- Statistical region: Southeast Slovenia
- Municipality: Trebnje

Area
  - Total: 0.35 km^{2} (0.14 sq mi)
- Elevation: 285.5 m (937 ft)

Population (2002)
  - Total: 35

Gorenja Dobrava (pronounced [ɡɔˈɾeːnja dɔˈbɾaːʋa]) is a small settlement in the Municipality of Trebnje in eastern Slovenia. It lies east of Trebnje, on a road leading north from Dolenja Nemška Vas. The area is part of the historical region of Lower Carniola. The municipality is now included in the Southeast Slovenia Statistical Region.
