= Gradišče =

Gradišče may refer to several places:

In Austria:

- Gradišče, Slovene name for Schloßberg (Leibnitz)

In Italy:

- Gradišče ob Soči, Slovene name for Gradisca d'Isonzo

In Slovenia:

- Dolenje Gradišče, Dolenjske Toplice, a settlement in the Municipality of Dolenjske Toplice
- Dolenje Gradišče pri Šentjerneju, a settlement in the Municipality of Šentjernej
- Gorenje Gradišče, Dolenjske Toplice, a settlement in the Municipality of Dolenjske Toplice
- Gorenje Gradišče pri Šentjerneju, a settlement in the Municipality of Šentjernej
- Lake Gradišče, a lake near Lukovica
- Gradišče, Grosuplje, a settlement in the Municipality of Grosuplje
- Gradišče, Kozje, a settlement in the Municipality of Kozje
- Gradišče nad Prvačino, a settlement in the Municipality of Nova Gorica
- Gradišče na Kozjaku, a settlement in the Municipality of Selnica ob Dravi
- Gradišče pri Divači, a settlement in the Municipality of Divača
- Gradišče pri Litiji, a settlement in the Municipality of Šmartno pri Litiji
- Gradišče pri Lukovici, a settlement in the Municipality of Lukovica
- Gradišče pri Materiji, a settlement in the Municipality of Hrpelje–Kozina
- Gradišče pri Ormožu, a settlement in the Municipality of Sveti Tomaž
- Gradišče pri Raki, a settlement in the Municipality of Krško
- Gradišče pri Štjaku, a settlement in the Municipality of Sežana
- Gradišče pri Trebnjem, a settlement in the Municipality of Trebnje
- Gradišče pri Vipavi, a settlement in the Municipality of Vipava
- Gradišče pri Vojniku, a settlement in the Municipality of Vojnik
- Gradišče pri Zalem Hribu, former name of Gradišče nad Prvačino
- Gradišče, Škofljica, a settlement in the Municipality of Škofljica
- Gradišče, Slovenj Gradec, a settlement in the City Municipality of Slovenj Gradec
- Gradišče, Šmartno pri Litiji, a settlement in the Municipality of Šmartno pri Litiji
- Gradišče, Tišina, a settlement in the Municipality of Tišina
- Gradišče, Velike Lašče, a settlement in the Municipality of Velike Lašče
- Gradišče, Videm, a settlement in the Municipality of Videm
- Gradišče v Slovenskih Goricah, former name of Sveta Trojica v Slovenskih Goricah
- Gradišče v Tuhinju, a settlement in the Municipality of Kamnik
- Zgornje Gradišče, a settlement in the Municipality of Šentilj
