= List of lakes of Slovenia =

Lake Bled

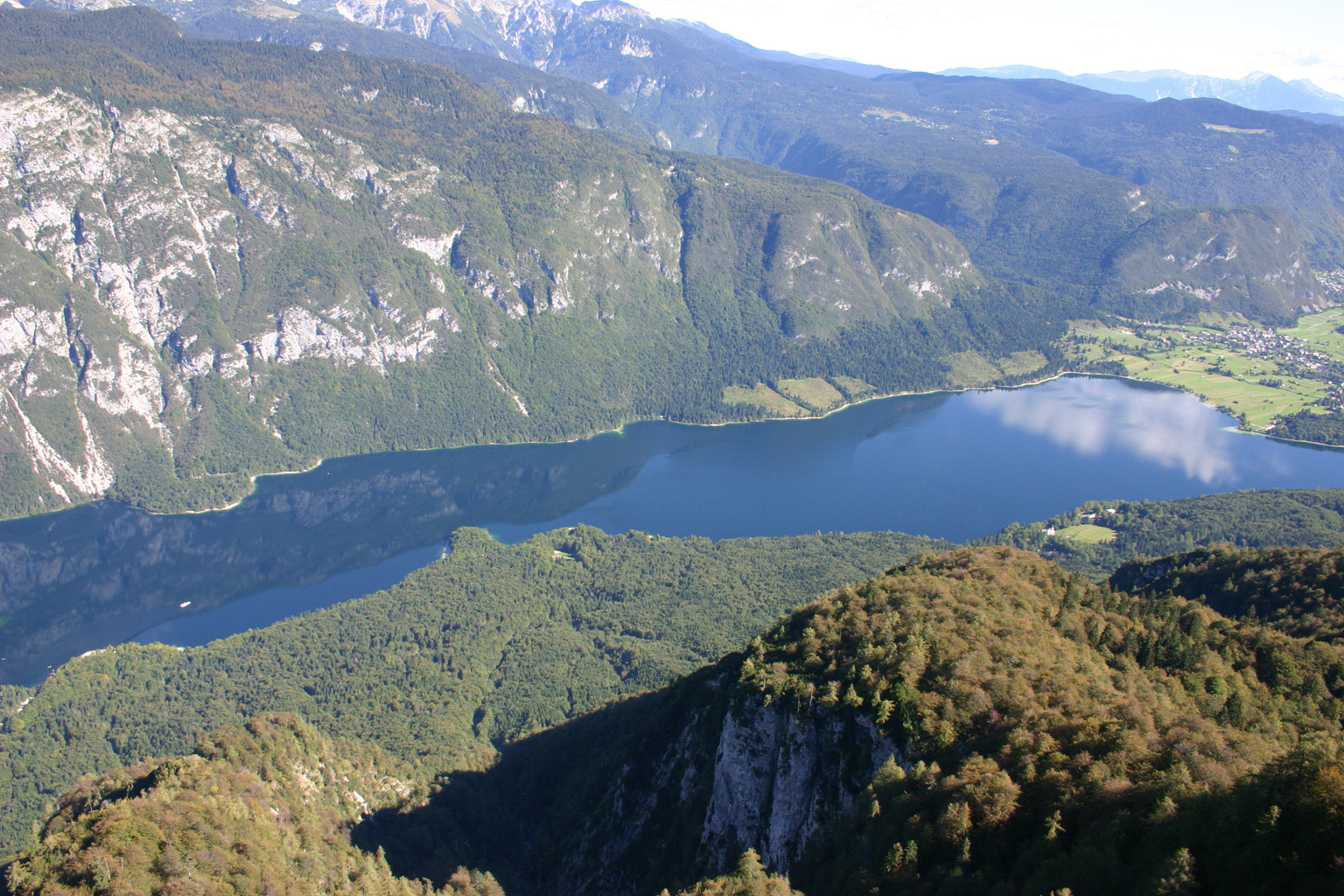
Lake Bohinj

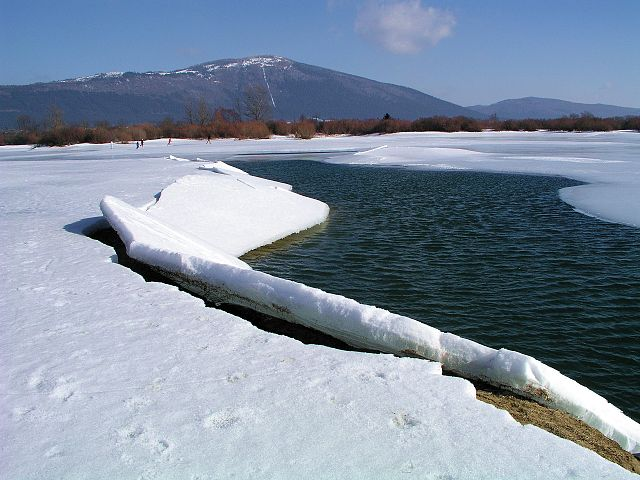
Lake Cerknica

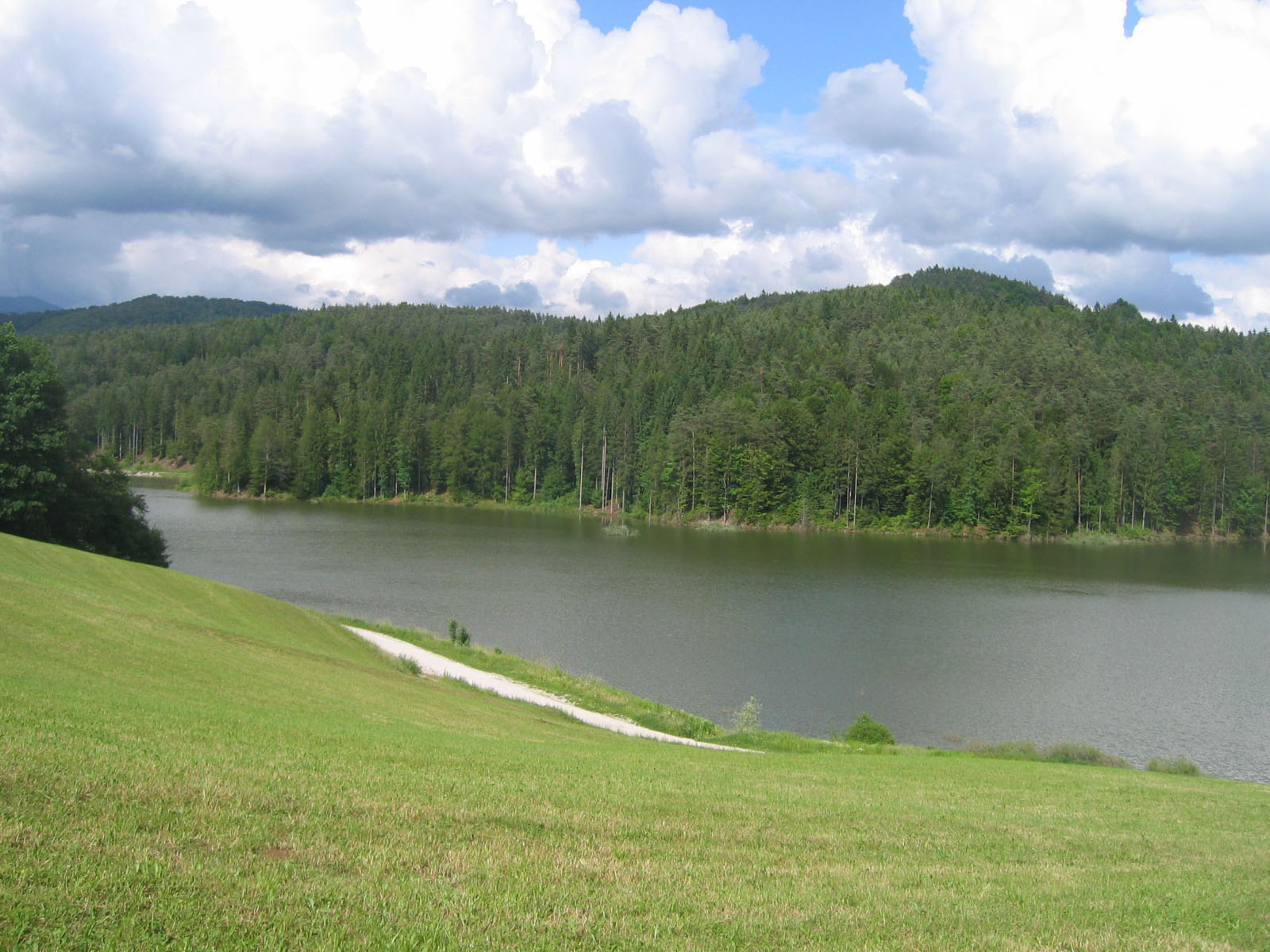
Lake Gradišče

This is a list of lakes in Slovenia. In Slovenia, there are 321 bodies of water classified as lakes, which includes intermittent lakes and artificial reservoirs. Most of the lakes in the country have glacial origin and many are intermittent because of the Karst surface. The largest glacial lakes are Lake Bled (147 ha) and Lake Bohinj (318 ha), and the largest intermittent lake is Lake Cerknica (2500 ha when completely filled). The deepest lake is the Wild Lake, reaching a depth of over 160 metres (520 ft), followed by Lake Družmir with the maximum depth of 87 metres (285 ft).

Jezero is the Slovene word for lake.

== B ==
- Black Lake (Črno jezero)
- Lake Blaguš (Blaguško jezero)
- Lake Bled (Blejsko jezero)
- Lake Bohinj (Bohinjsko jezero)
- Lake Bukovnica (Bukovniško jezero)

== C ==
- Lake Cerknica (Cerkniško jezero)

== D ==
- Wild Lake (Divje jezero)
- Double Lake (Dvojno jezero)
- Lake Družmir (Družmirsko jezero)

== G ==
- Lake Gradišče (Gradiško jezero)

== J ==
- Lake Jasna

== K ==
- Lake Komarnik (Komarniško jezero)
- Lake Kreda (Jezero Kreda)
- Lake Krn (Krnsko jezero)

== L ==
- Lake Ledava (Ledavsko jezero)
- Lakes Lovrenc (Lovrenška jezera)

== M ==
- Lake Maribor (Mariborsko jezero)

== O ==
- Lake Ormož (Ormoško jezero)

== P ==
- Lake Palčje (Palško jezero)
- Lake Petelinje (Petelinjsko jezero)
- Lake Planšar (Planšarsko jezero)
- Lake Ptuj (Ptujsko jezero)

== R ==
- Lake Ribniško (Ribniško jezero)

== Š ==
- Lake Šalek (Šaleško jezero)
- Lake Šmartno (Šmartinsko jezero)

== V ==
- Lake Vogrsko (Vogrsko jezero)

== Z ==
- Lake Zbilje (Zbiljsko jezero)
- Lake Žovnek (Žovneško jezero)
