= Kreda =

Kreda may refer to:

- Kreda, a clan of the Toubou people of North Africa
- Kréda (horse), a variant of the Dongola horse breed
- Lake Kreda, a lake in Slovenia
- Kreda, a word in some Slavic languages referring to chalk or to the Cretaceous

== See also ==
- Creda
