= Dolga Njiva =

- Location in Slovenia
- Coordinates: 45°55′32″N 15°04′10″E
- Country: Slovenia
- Traditional region: Lower Carniola
- Statistical region: Southeast Slovenia
- Municipality: Trebnje
- Elevation: 390 m (1,280 ft)

Dolga Njiva (pronounced [ˈdoːu̯ɡa ˈnjiːʋa], German: Langenacker or Douganiwa) is a former village in eastern Slovenia in the Municipality of Trebnje. It is now part of the village of Gradišče pri Trebnjem. It is part of the traditional region of Lower Carniola and is now included in the Southeast Slovenia Statistical Region.

== Geography ==
Dolga Njiva lies north of the village center of Gradišče pri Trebnjem. It stands on a ridge with vineyards above the valley of Pristava Creek (Slovene: Pristavski potok). Babja Loka Creek flows through the valley immediately south of the settlement.

== History ==
Dolga Njiva was annexed by Gradišče pri Trebnjem in 1953, ending its existence as a separate settlement.
