= Gradišče pri Lukovici =

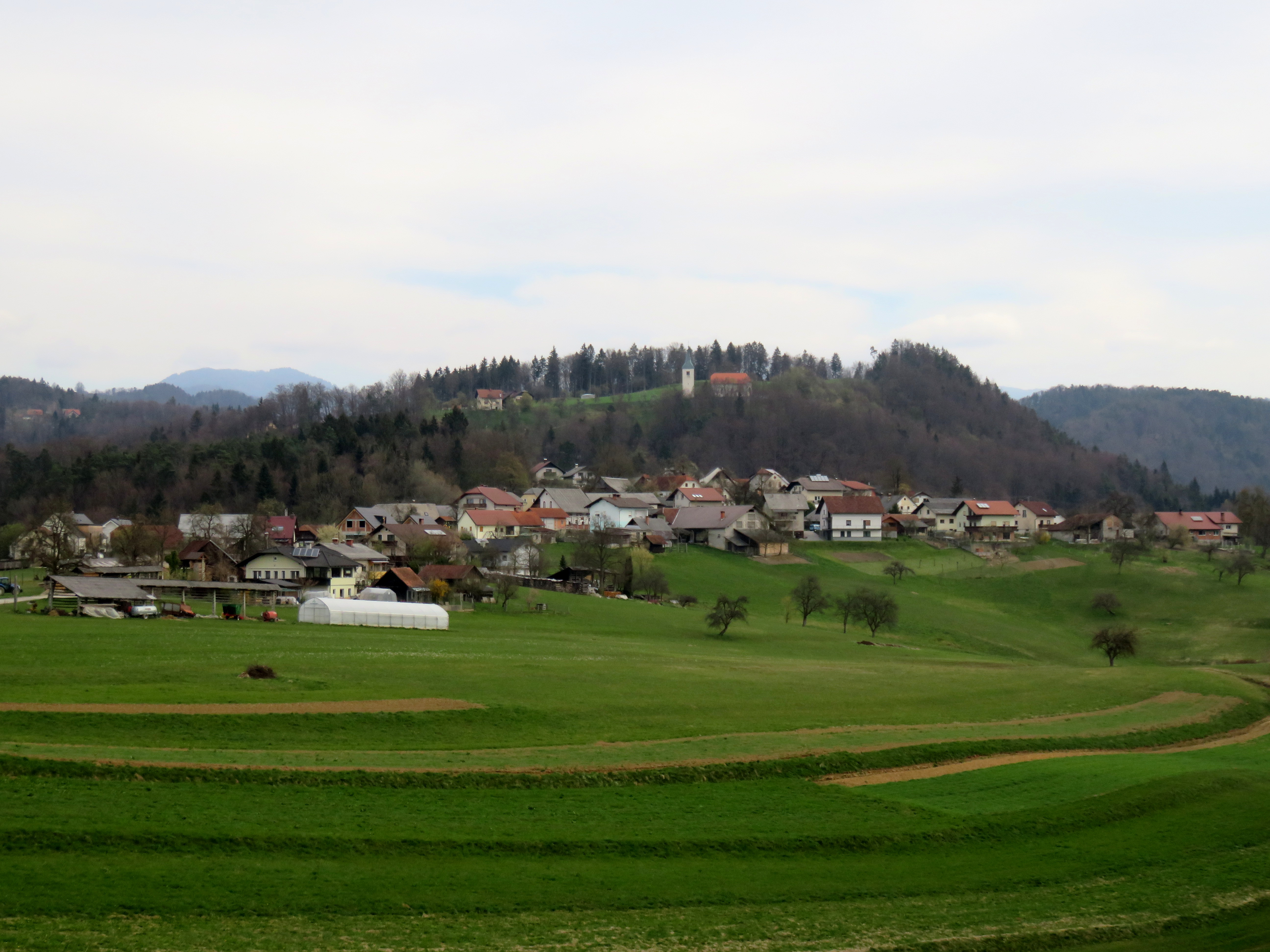

- Location in Slovenia
- Coordinates: 46°9′51.04″N 14°42′3.62″E
- Country: Slovenia
- Traditional region: Upper Carniola
- Statistical region: Central Slovenia
- Municipality: Lukovica

Area
  - Total: 2.32 km^{2} (0.90 sq mi)
- Elevation: 391.8 m (1,285 ft)

Population (2002)
  - Total: 200

Gradišče pri Lukovici (pronounced [ɡɾaˈdiːʃtʃɛ pɾi ˈluːkɔʋitsi]) is a settlement in the Municipality of Lukovica in the eastern part of the Upper Carniola region of Slovenia.

== Name ==
The name of the settlement was changed from Gradišče to Gradišče pri Lukovici in 1953.

== Church ==
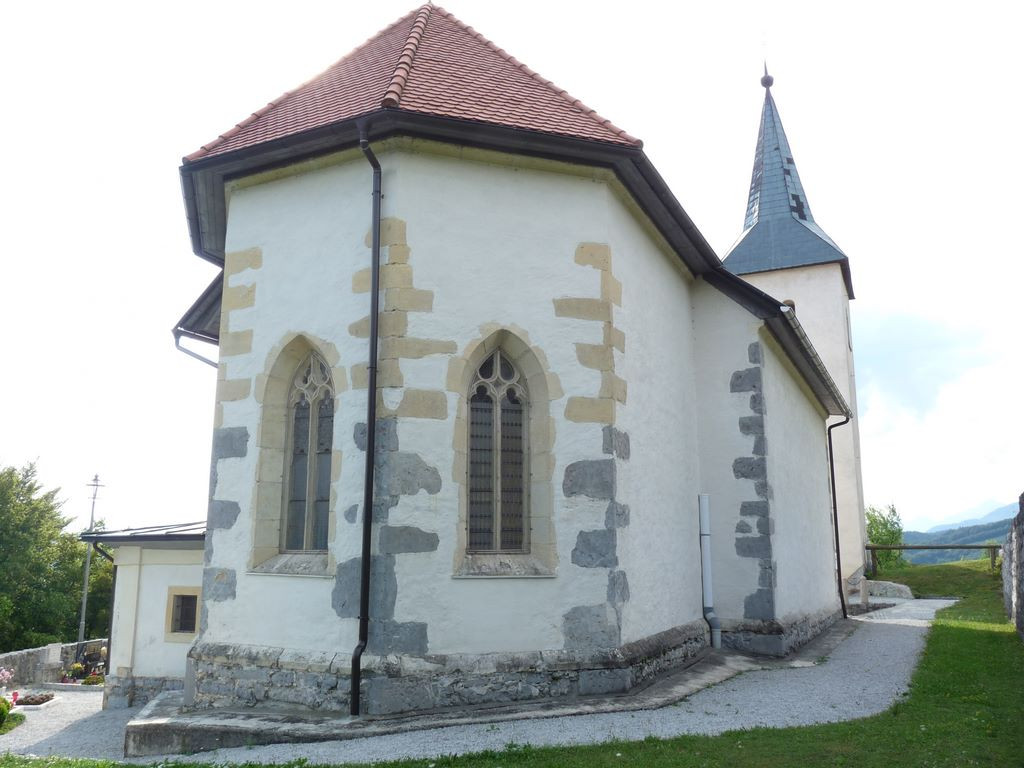
St. Margaret's Church in Gradišče pri Lukovici

The local church is built is dedicated to Saint Margaret (Slovene: sveta Marjeta). It dates to the early 16th century.

== Gradišče Reservoir ==
South of the settlement lies the reservoir Lake Gradišče.
