= Portrait of the Artist's Father =

Painting by Giuseppe Tominz

- Portret očeta (Slovene)
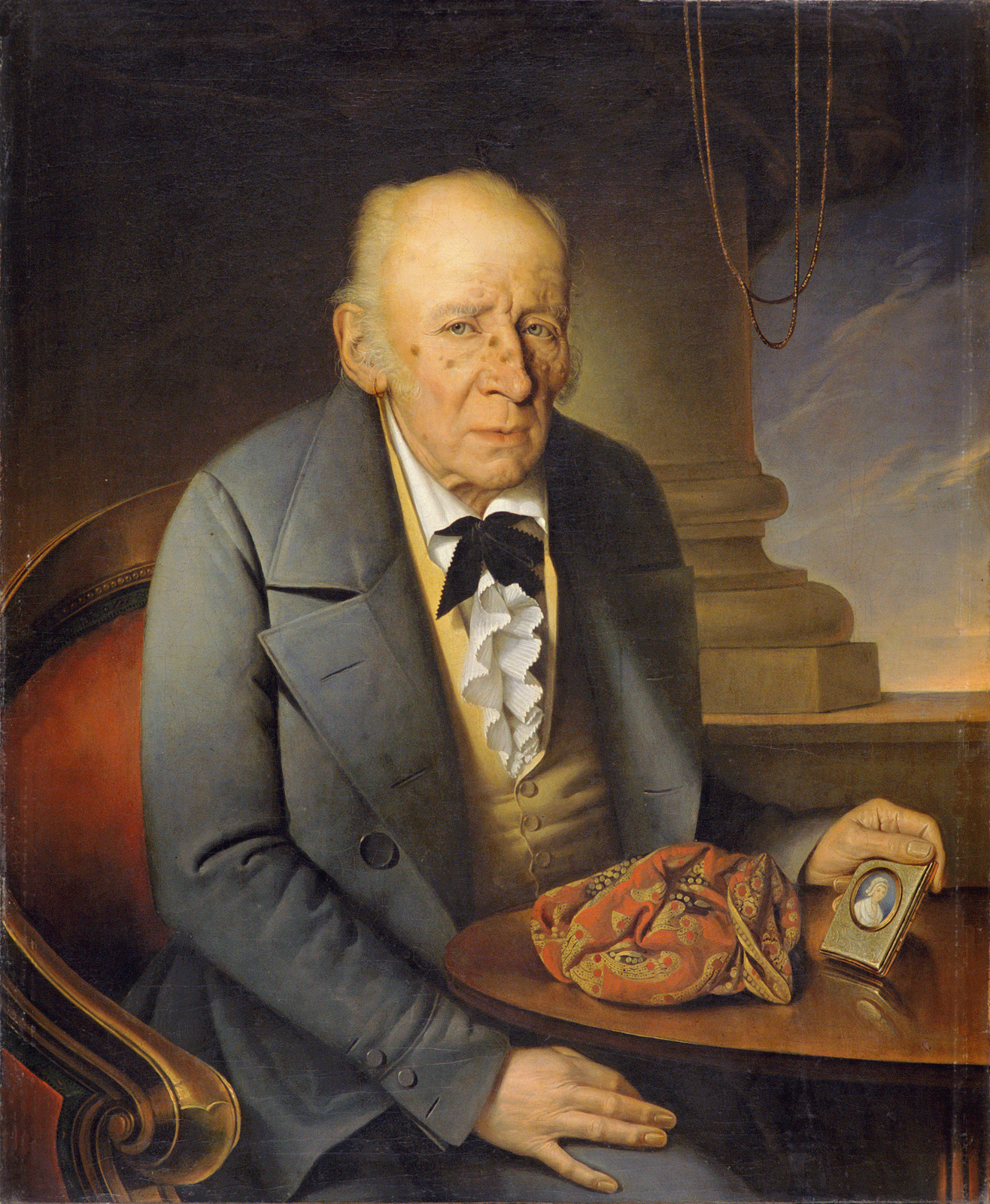
- Artist: Giuseppe Tominz
- Year: 1848
- Medium: oil on canvas
- Dimensions: 90 cm × 74.5 cm (35 in × 29.3 in)
- Location: National Gallery of Slovenia; Ljubljana

Portrait of the Artist's Father (Slovenian: Portret očeta) is a painting by the Slovenian-Italian artist Giuseppe Tominz from 1848.

== Description ==
The picture is painted in oil on canvas and has dimensions of 90 x 74.5 cm. It has been a part of the collection of the National Gallery of Slovenia in Ljubljana since 1926.

== Analysis ==
Giuseppe Tominz lived and worked in Austria-Hungary. He is one of the most famous Slovenian portrait painters of the Biedermeier period, which was characterized by art of the bourgeoisie, with an emphasis on idyllic or domestic genre art and reproduction of the present. His most characteristic works are realistic portraits.

In Portrait of the Artist's Father, Tominz depicts his father on the occasion of his 80th birthday. He is seated on a chair by a table. With his left hand he holds a small portrait of a woman. The portrait is entirely in the style of naturalism and is devoid of any idealization.
