= Giuseppe Tominz =

Slovenian painter

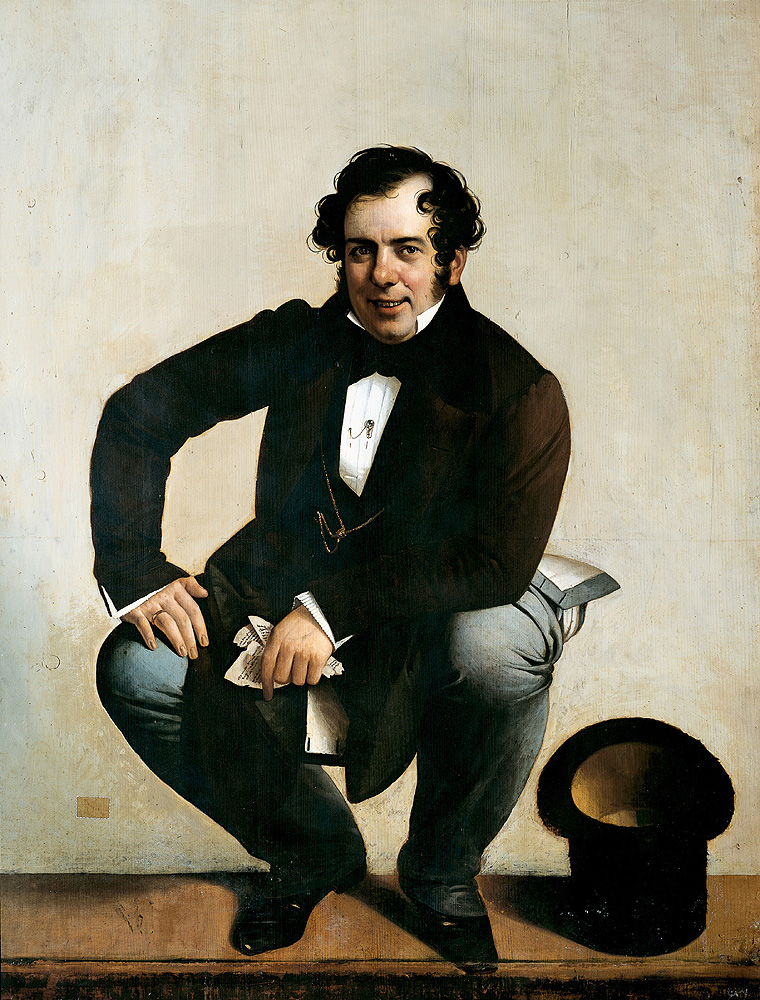
- Self-portrait
- Born: 6 July 1790; Gorizia
- Died: 24 April 1866 (aged 75); Gradišče nad Prvačino

Giuseppe Tominz, also known as Jožef Tominc (6 July 1790 – 24 April 1866), was an Italian-Slovene painter from the Austrian Littoral. He worked mostly in the cultural milieu of the upper bourgeoisie in the Austrian Illyrian Kingdom. He was one of the most prominent portraitists of the Biedermeier period. He became renowned for his realistic portraits. He worked mostly in the Austrian Littoral, but also produced religious paintings in Carniola and in Croatia. His handiwork can be seen in the Church of the Birth of the Blessed Virgin Mary in Donji Stoliv. Nowadays, many of his works are on display in the Revoltella Museum in Trieste, some in the National Gallery of Slovenia in Ljubljana, National Museum of Serbia and in the Museum of History and Art of Gorizia. He is considered part of both the Italian and the Slovenian national culture canon.

== Biography ==
=== Early life and education ===
Giuseppe Tominz was born in Gorizia as the second of eleven children of Ivano Tominz, a dealer in ironware, and his wife Maria Anna (née Gioacchini) of Udine. He was educated in a bilingual environment. He attended a primary school run by Piarists in Gorizia, where he began to learn to paint in the third year. He received his first training as a painter from the local artist Karel Keber and probably also from the painter Franz Caucig.

=== Early career ===
In 1803 Tominc left Gorizia in order to study and in 1809 went to Rome with letters of recommendation from the Archduchess Maria Anna of Austria, sister of Emperor Francis I of Austria, and count Francesco della Torre. He lived and studied from 1810 until 1817 with the painter Domenico Conti Bazzani and at the Accademia di San Luca, where he won a silver medal in 1814 for his drawing Study of the Apostople. In Rome he developed a distinctive drawing technique, with plasticity in the figures and objects, and cool colours, producing works in a classicizing style similar to that of Ingres and of Vincenzo Camuccini (e.g. Self-portrait with the Artist’s Brother Francesco, c. 1818; Gorizia, Musei Provinciali Palazzo Attems-Petzenstein). In 1816, he married Maria Ricci. In 1818, they had twin sons. Of his early artistic works, several anatomical studies, sketches and one of his landscapes View of Vietri, Rieti and the Salerno Bay have survived.

=== Mature work ===
In 1818 Tominz visited Naples and then returned to Gorizia before visiting Vienna briefly in 1819. From 1821 until 1823 he painted in Ljubljana, mostly portraits of local dignitaries and participants at the Congress of Laibach and religious paintings, but also a portrait of Emperor Francis. His single figure and group portraits (e.g. the Family of Dr. Frušić, c. 1830; Ljubljana, National Gallery of Slovenia) show a familiarity with Biedermeier painting. In 1830 he left for Trieste, where he remained until 1855, and where he had a one-man exhibition.

Tominz was famous for his technical facility: in 1836 he painted 25 portraits of English naval officers in 25 days. Tominc’s full-length and half-length portraits often include landscapes in the background and objects or views that relate to the profession or property of the sitter. He was particularly skilful at depicting shining surfaces, jewellery, cloth and people’s distinctive features, sometimes with humour or irony (e.g. Self-portrait in the Lavatory, c. 1830; Trieste, Revoltella Museum). He also painted religious scenes in the style of the Nazarenes or after Raphael and Pierre Mignard. In 1855 he returned to Gorizia and then went to Gradišče nad Prvačino (Gradiscutta, in Italian) to his brother’s estate, where he had a studio and where he died, nearly blind, in 1866.

== Work ==
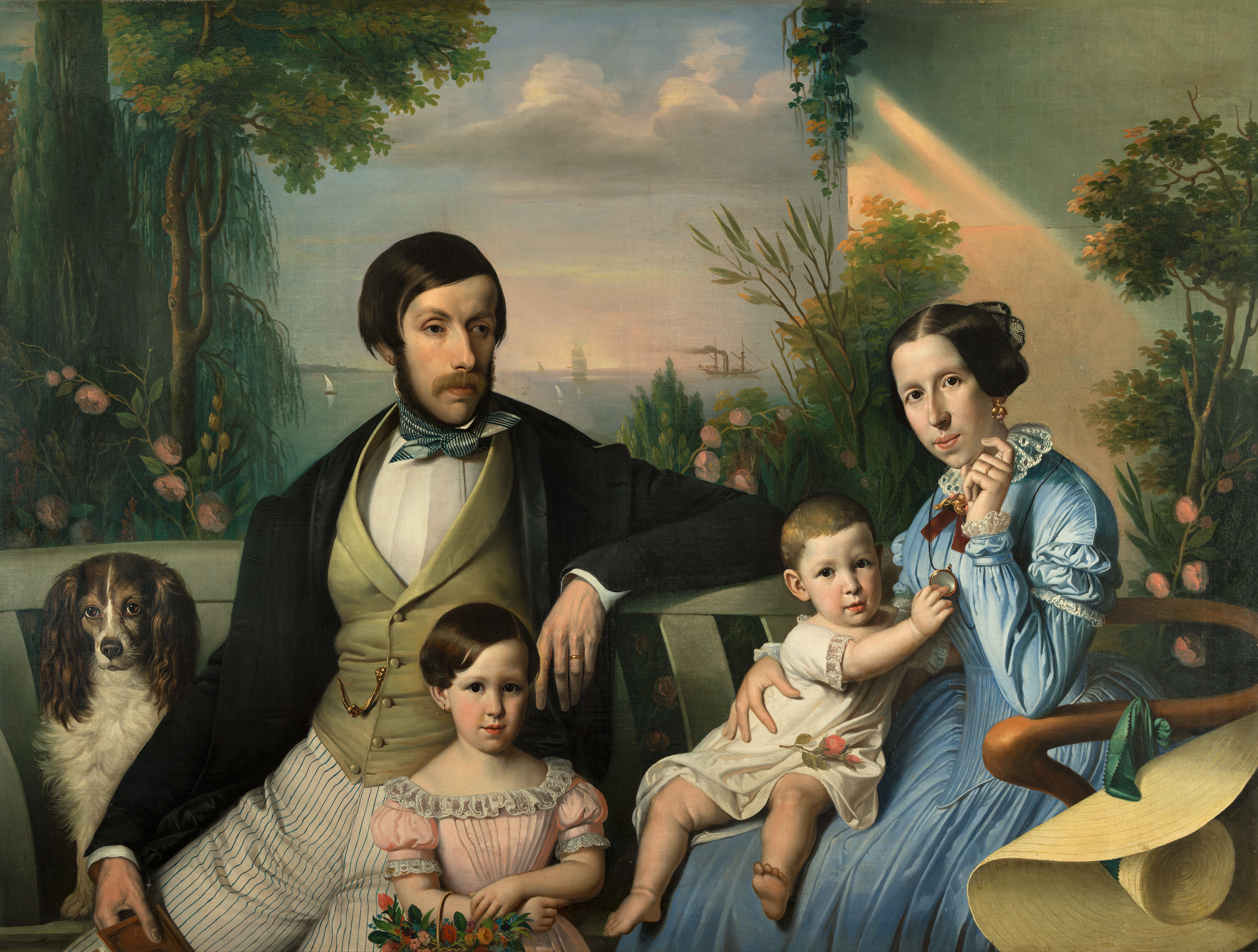
Pietro Stanislao Parisi with Family from 1849

Tominz's early works include portraits of members of the nobility and bourgeoisie, but also of simple people. His influence can be seen in the works of the Slovene painters Matevž Langus and Michael Stroy.

The style of Tominz's portraits was influenced by late Classicism and by the style of Viennese portrait artists of the Biedermeier period. The people in his portraits have sharp features and clear forms, but despite this the depictions are realistic, sometimes with an ironic touch. The backgrounds are filled with landscapes or the city from which the person depicted originated.

Tominz also included objects that hint at the profession or the lifestyle of the person depicted. Inspired by Jean Auguste Dominique Ingres or Vincenzo Camuccini, he used cool colours and plastic models of people. He is however best known for his oil painting technique, his precise skills of observation and his rapid style.

When depicting religious motifs, Tominzc relied on graphical templates, the old Italian masters and Nazarene painters. Amongst his numerous sacred works are altars and other pictures for churches in Gorizia, Prvačina, Aquileia, Kanal ob Soči, Gradisca d'Isonzo, and elsewhere.

== Works ==
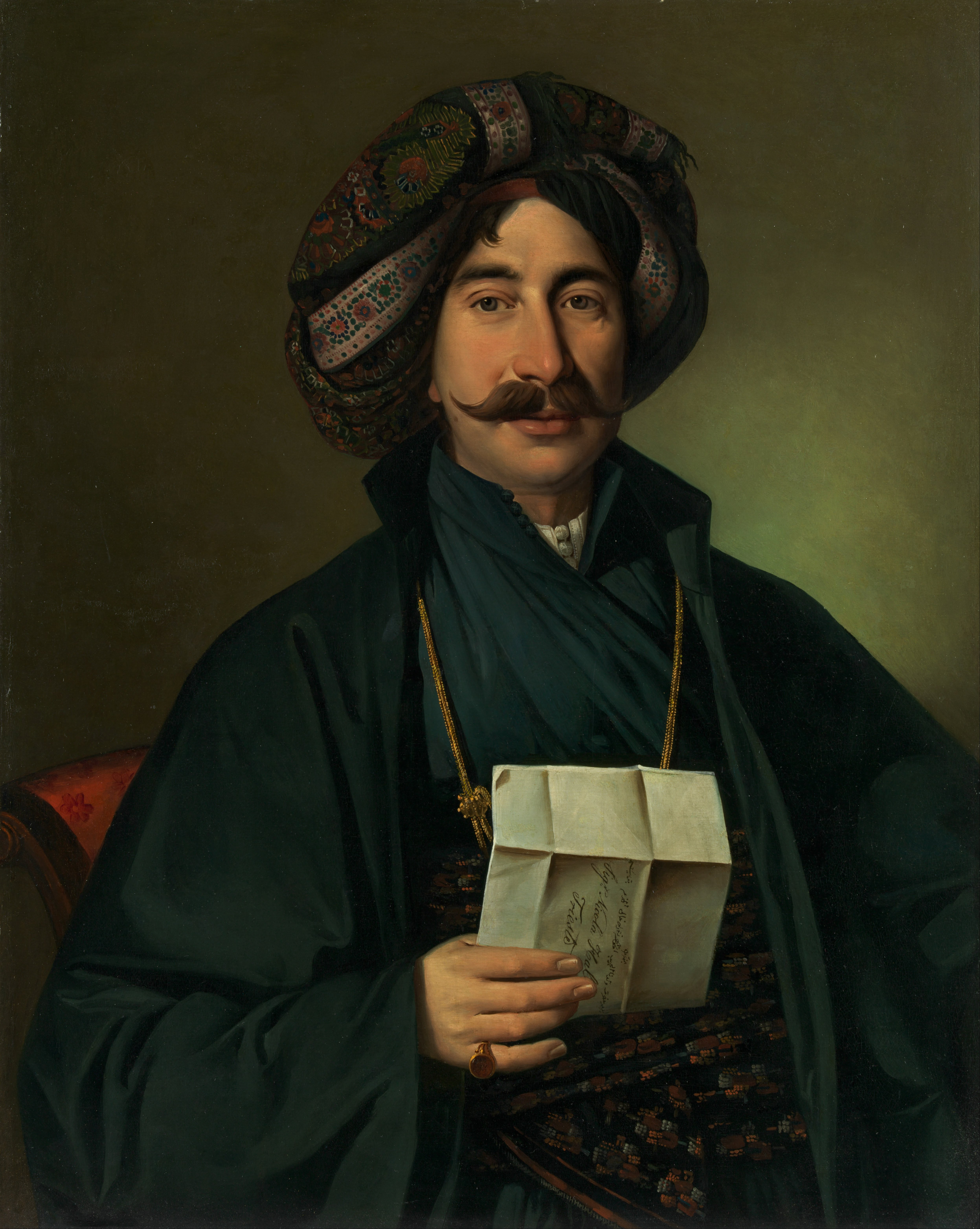
Giuseppe Tominz - Man in Ottoman dress

- Woman with White Turban
- Lady with Camellia
- Dr. Frušić with Family
- Portrait of Petar II Petrović-Njegoš, 1833
- The Wife of Mayor Sancin
- Cäcilia Countess of Auersperg, mother of Count Anton Alexander von Auersperg
- Three Ladies from the Moscon Family
- Nikola Lazarević
- Marija Lazarević
- Capetan Polić
- Man with Letter (Self-Portrait)
- Self-Portrait at the Window
- Self-Portrait (On the toilet)
- Portrait of Father
- Portrait of Ciriaco Catraro

== Gallery ==
Selected works

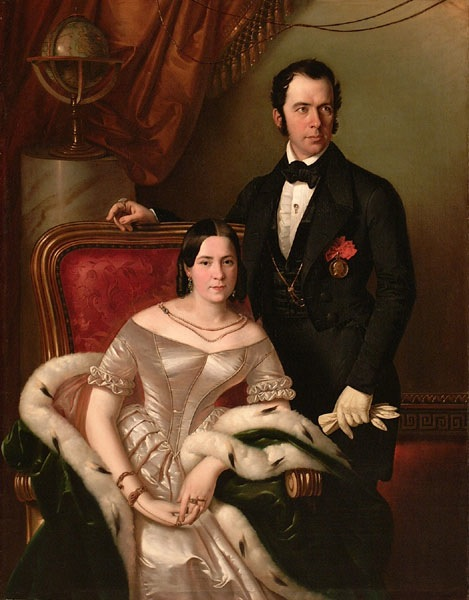
Piergiacomo and Maria Leva

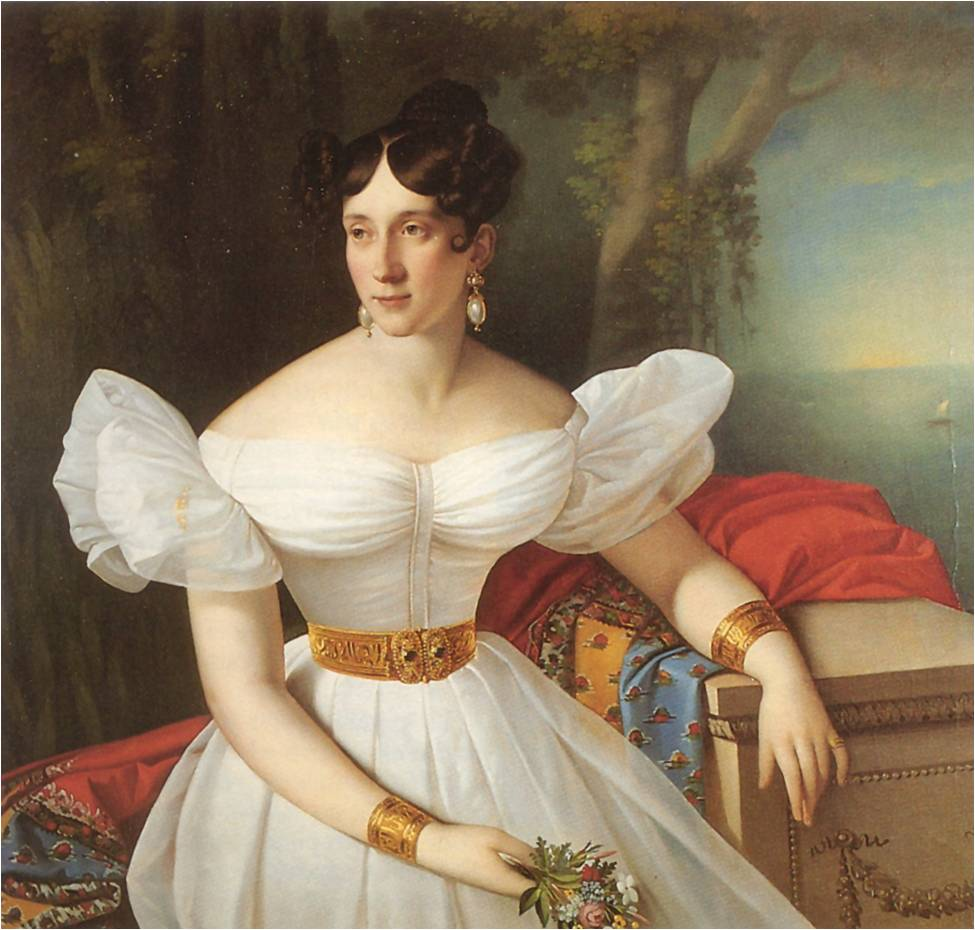
Portrait of Giuseppina Holzknecht

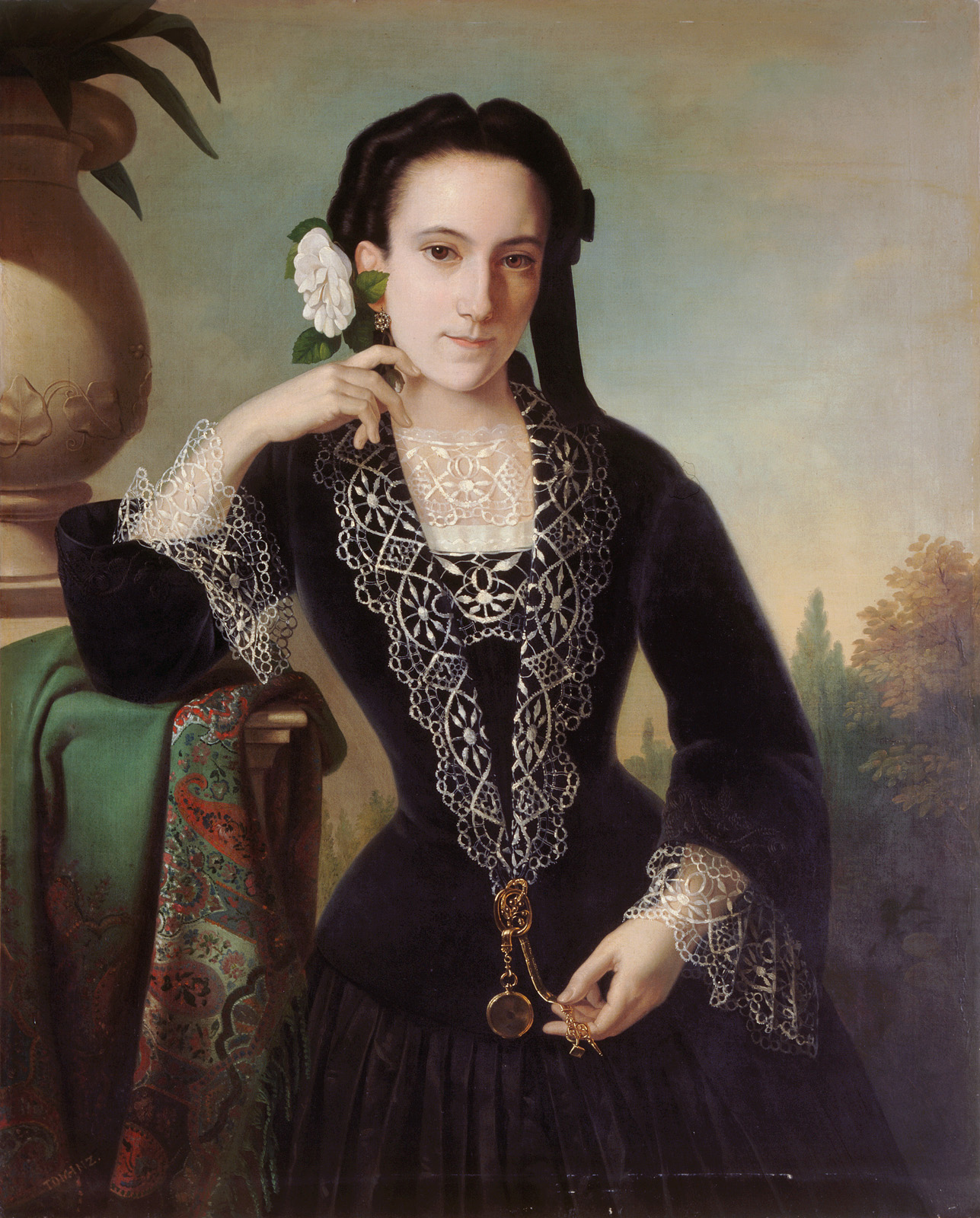
Lady with a camelia

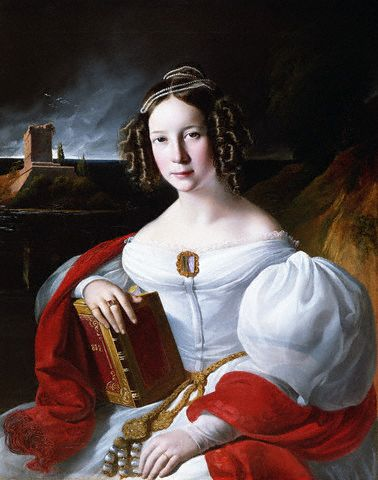
Enrichetta Spingher Hofer

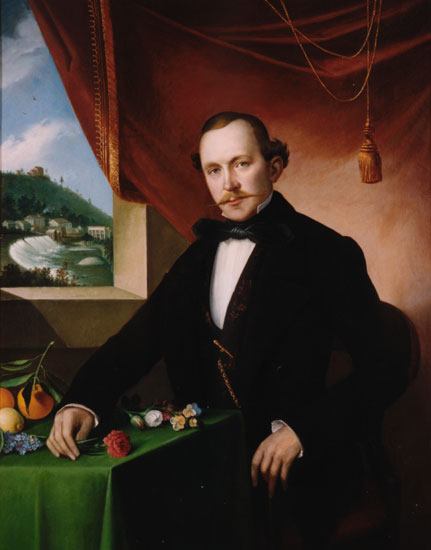
Ignazio Furlani

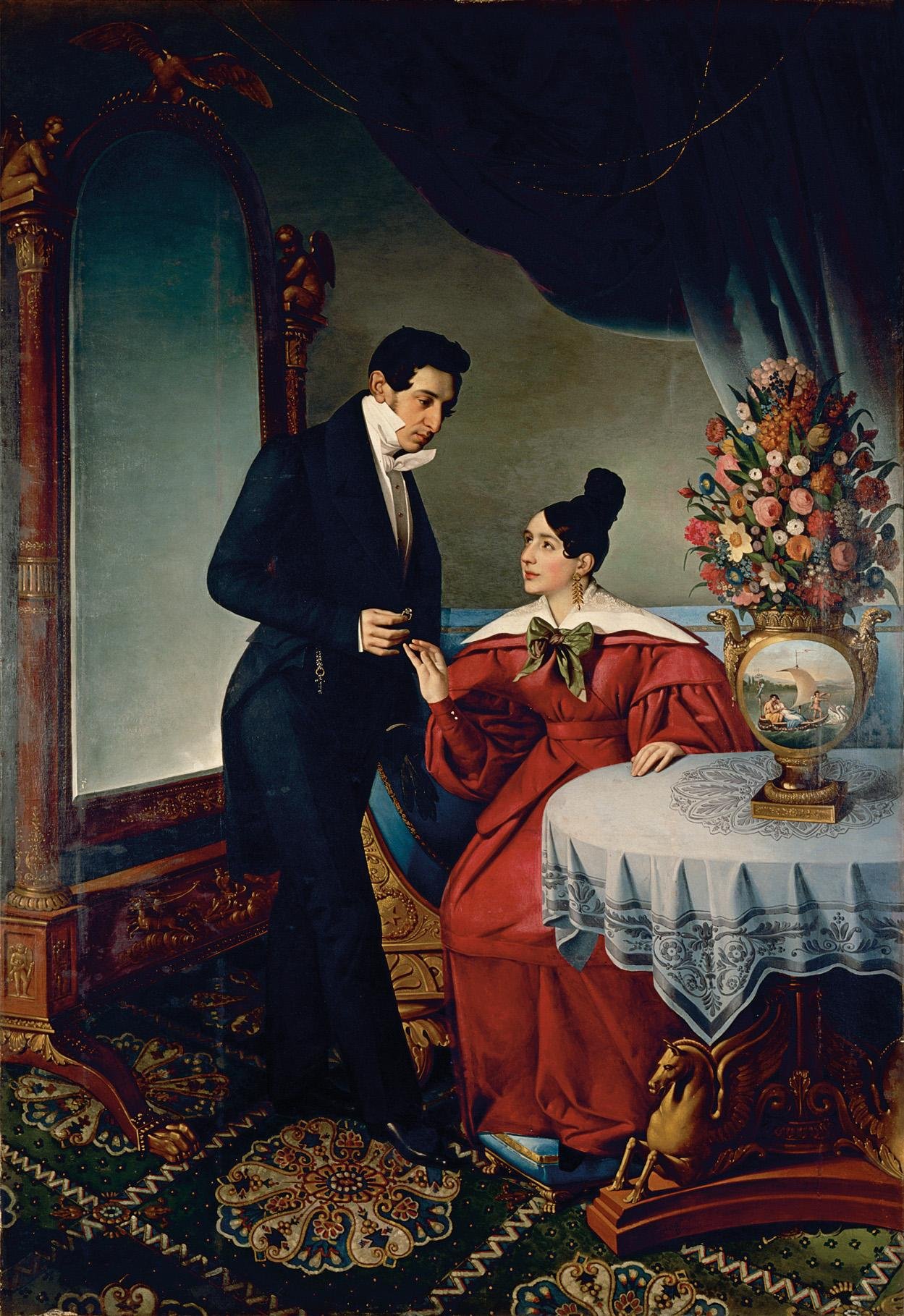
Promessi

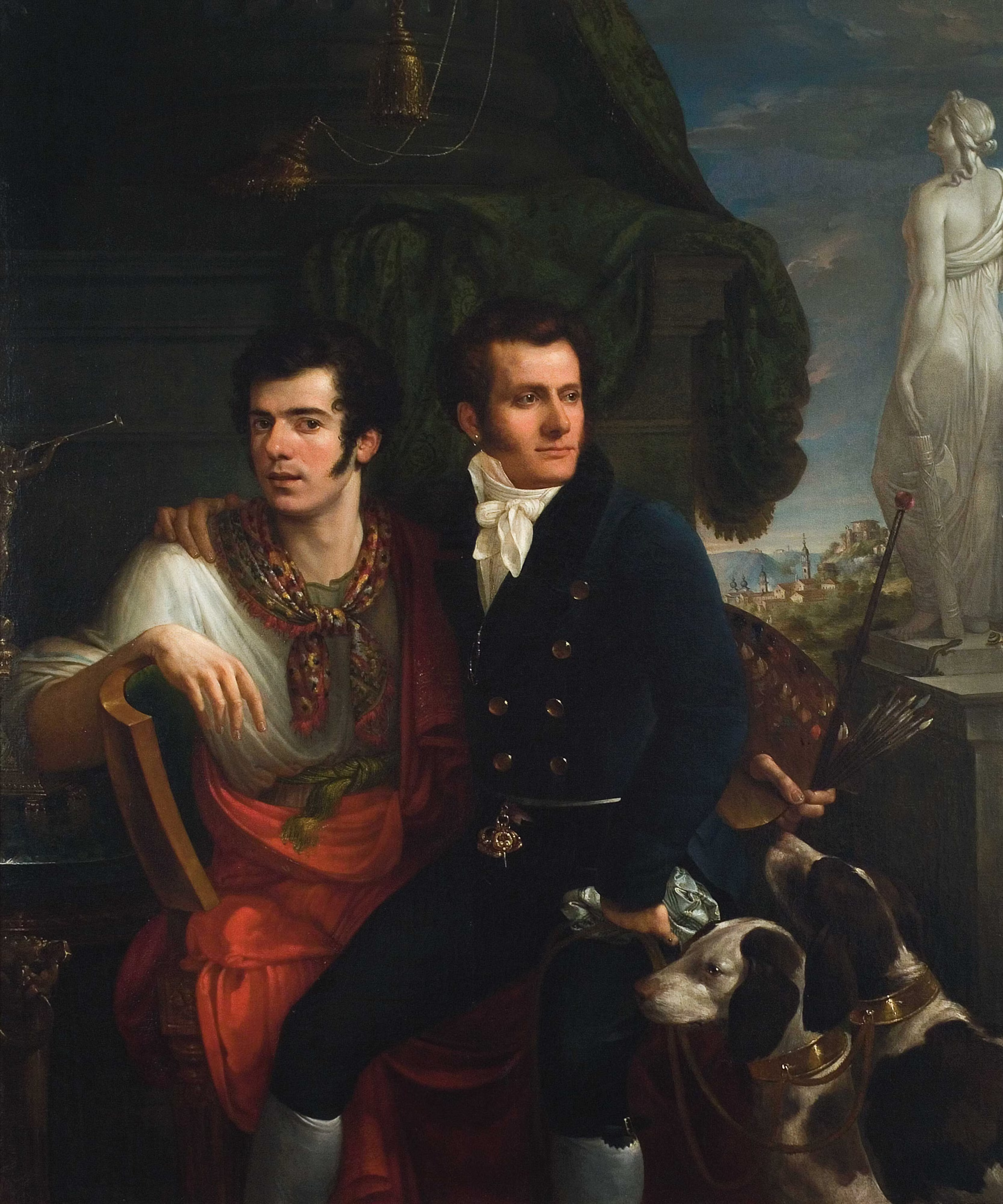
The artist and his brother

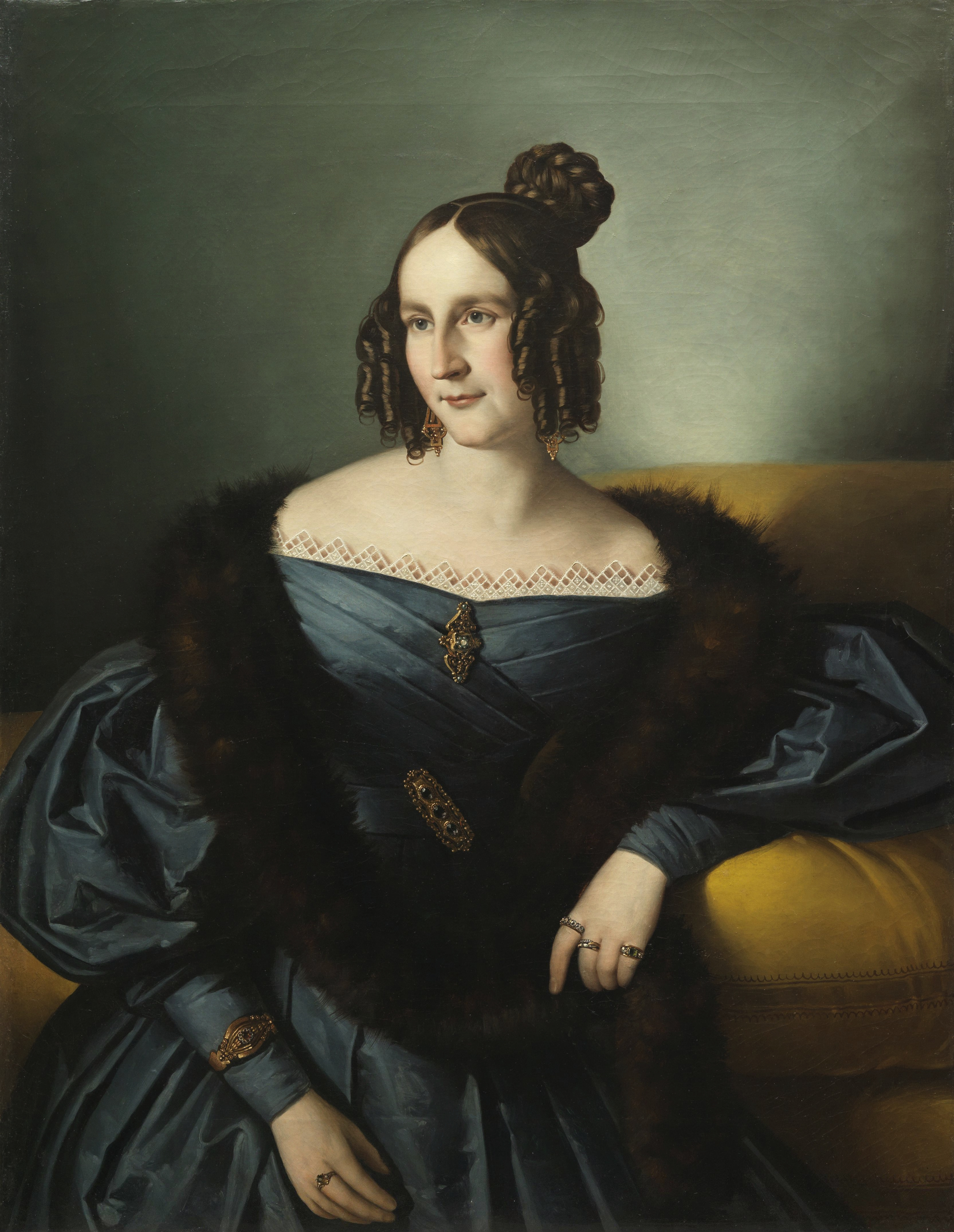
Portrait of a Woman

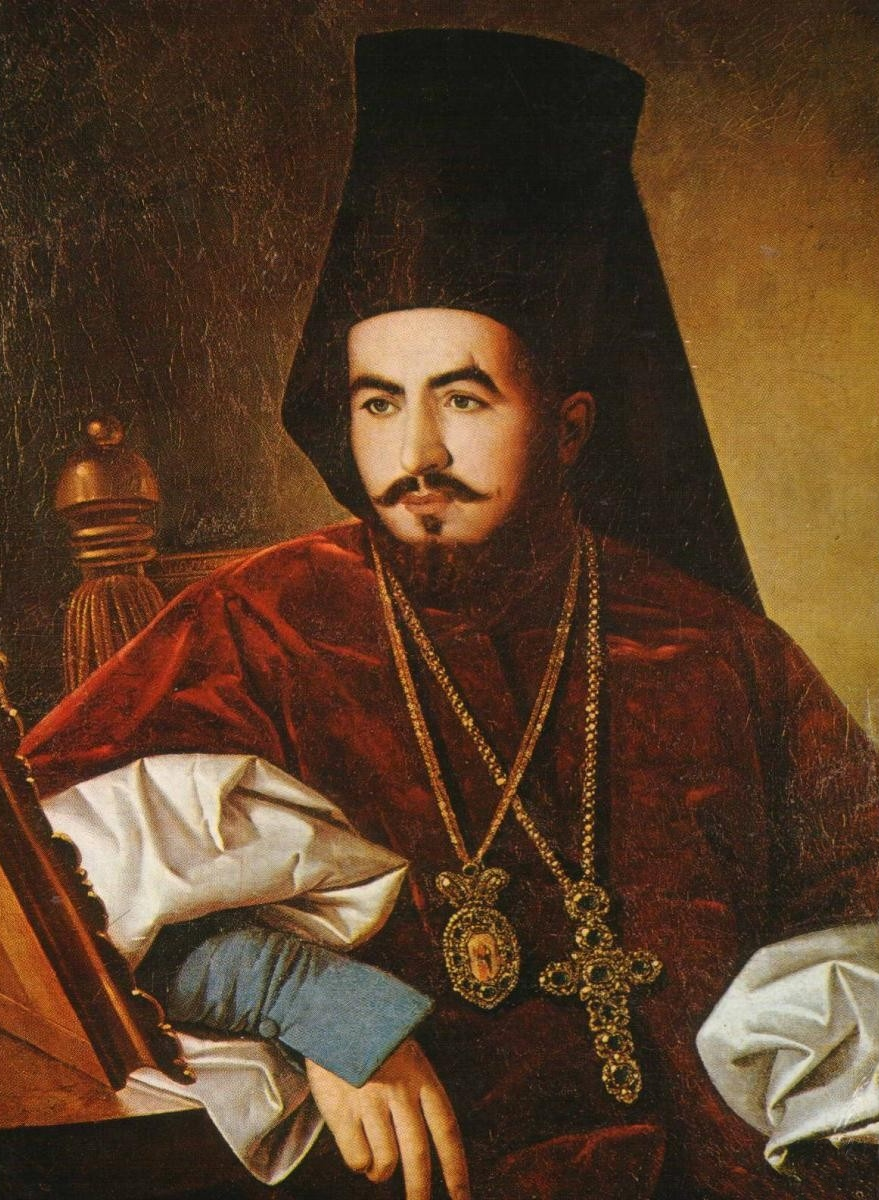
Portrait of Petar II Petrović-Njegoš

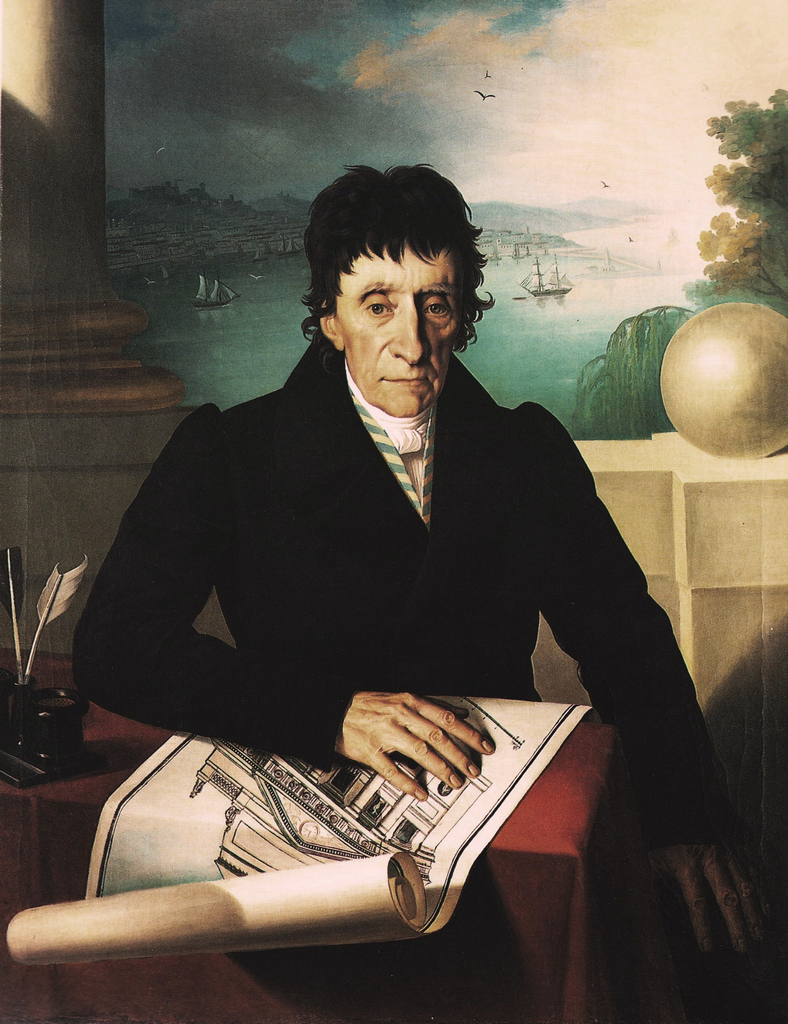
Portrait of Ciriaco Catraro

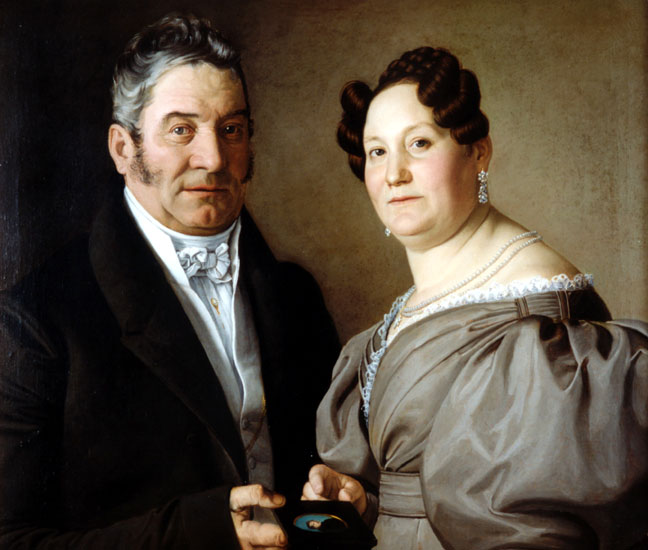
The Berles

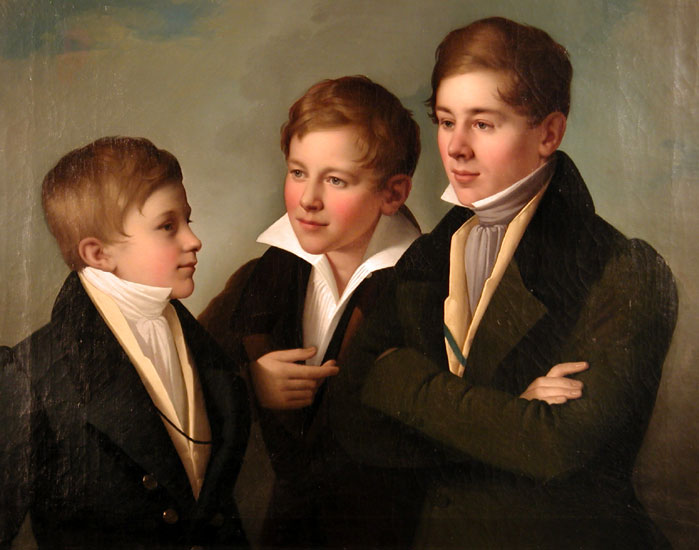
Three brothers

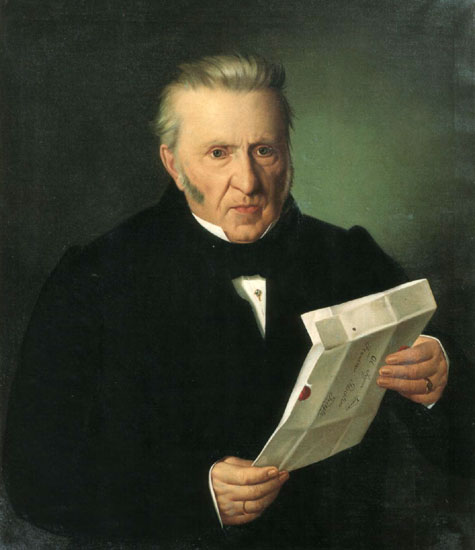
Francesco Pascottini

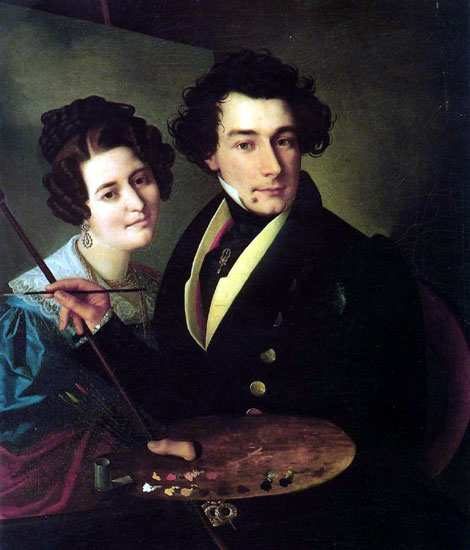
Giuseppe Gatteri

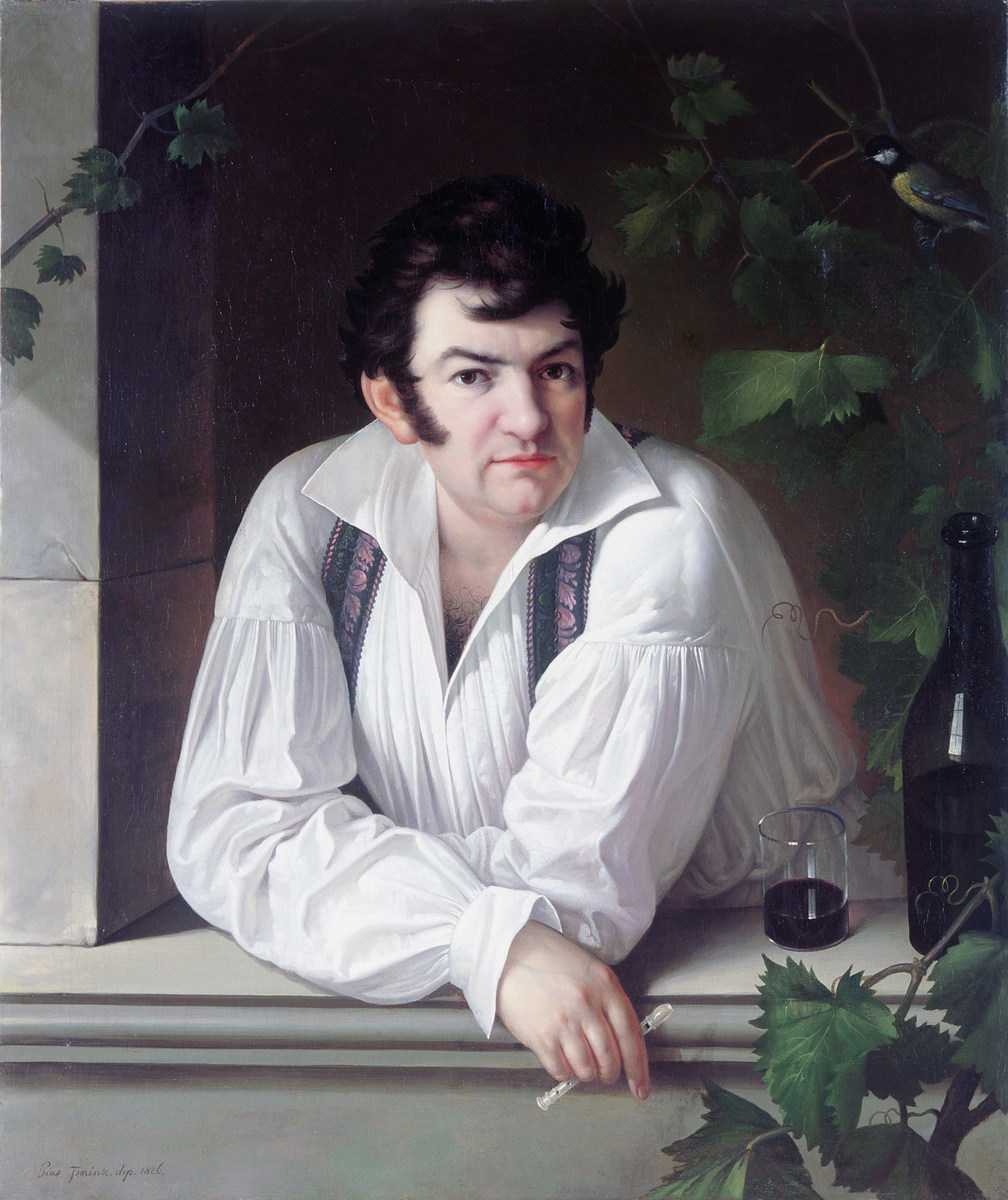
Self-Portrait at the Window

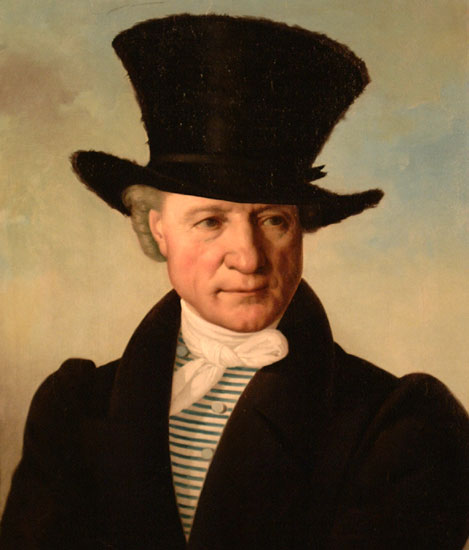
Paolo Preinitsch

== See also ==
- Portrait of the Artist's Father
