= Gradišče pri Litiji =

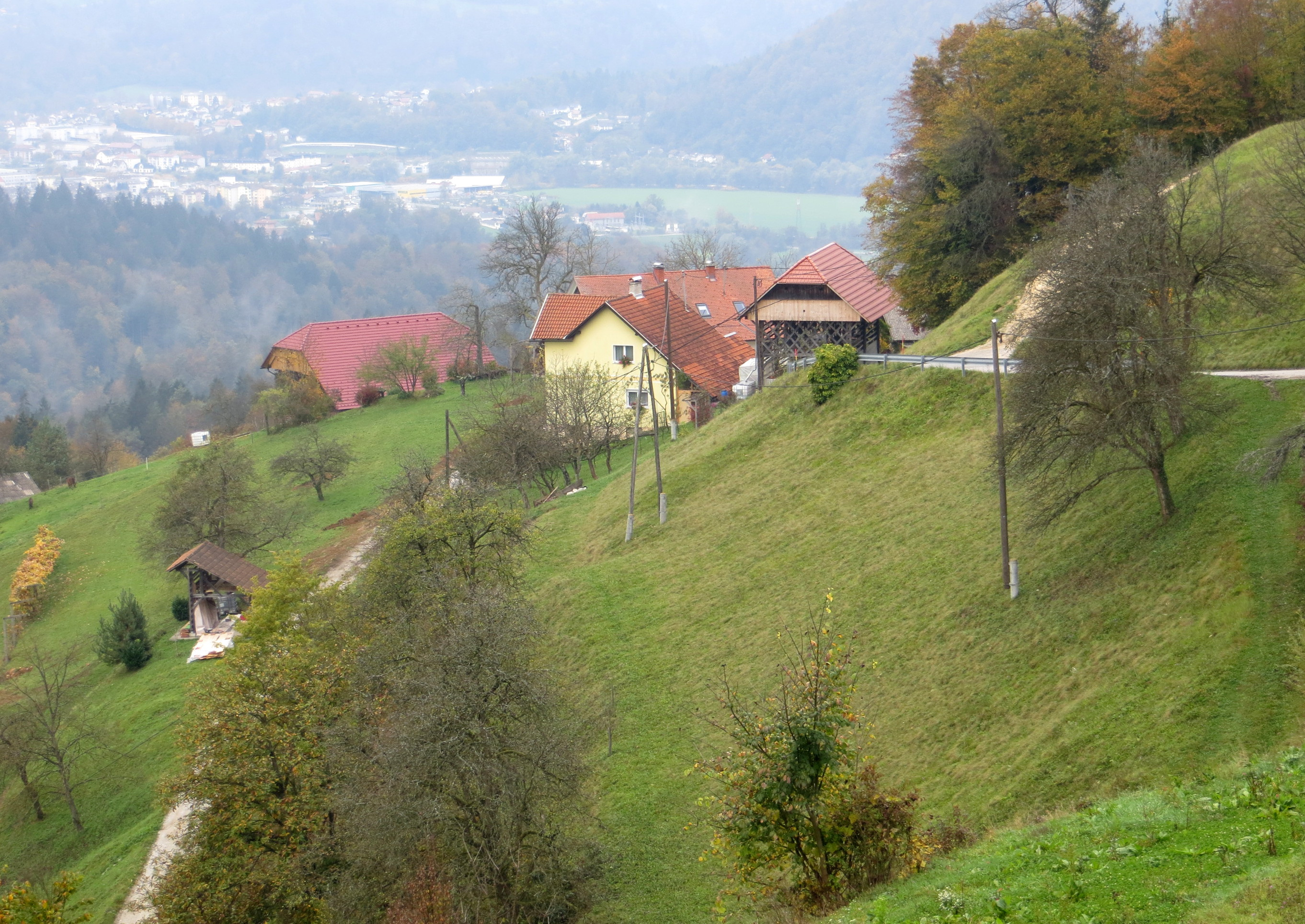

- Location in Slovenia
- Coordinates: 46°3′16.04″N 14°52′32.42″E
- Country: Slovenia
- Traditional region: Lower Carniola
- Statistical region: Central Slovenia
- Municipality: Šmartno pri Litiji

Area
  - Total: 3.66 km^{2} (1.41 sq mi)
- Elevation: 456.6 m (1,498 ft)

Population (2002)
  - Total: 89

Gradišče pri Litiji (pronounced [ɡɾaˈdiːʃtʃɛ pɾi liˈtiːji]) is a village east of Litija in central Slovenia. It belongs to the Municipality of Šmartno pri Litiji. The area is part of the historical region of Lower Carniola. The municipality is now included in the Central Slovenia Statistical Region.

== Name ==
The name of the settlement was changed from Gradišče to Gradišče pri Litiji in 1953.

== Church ==
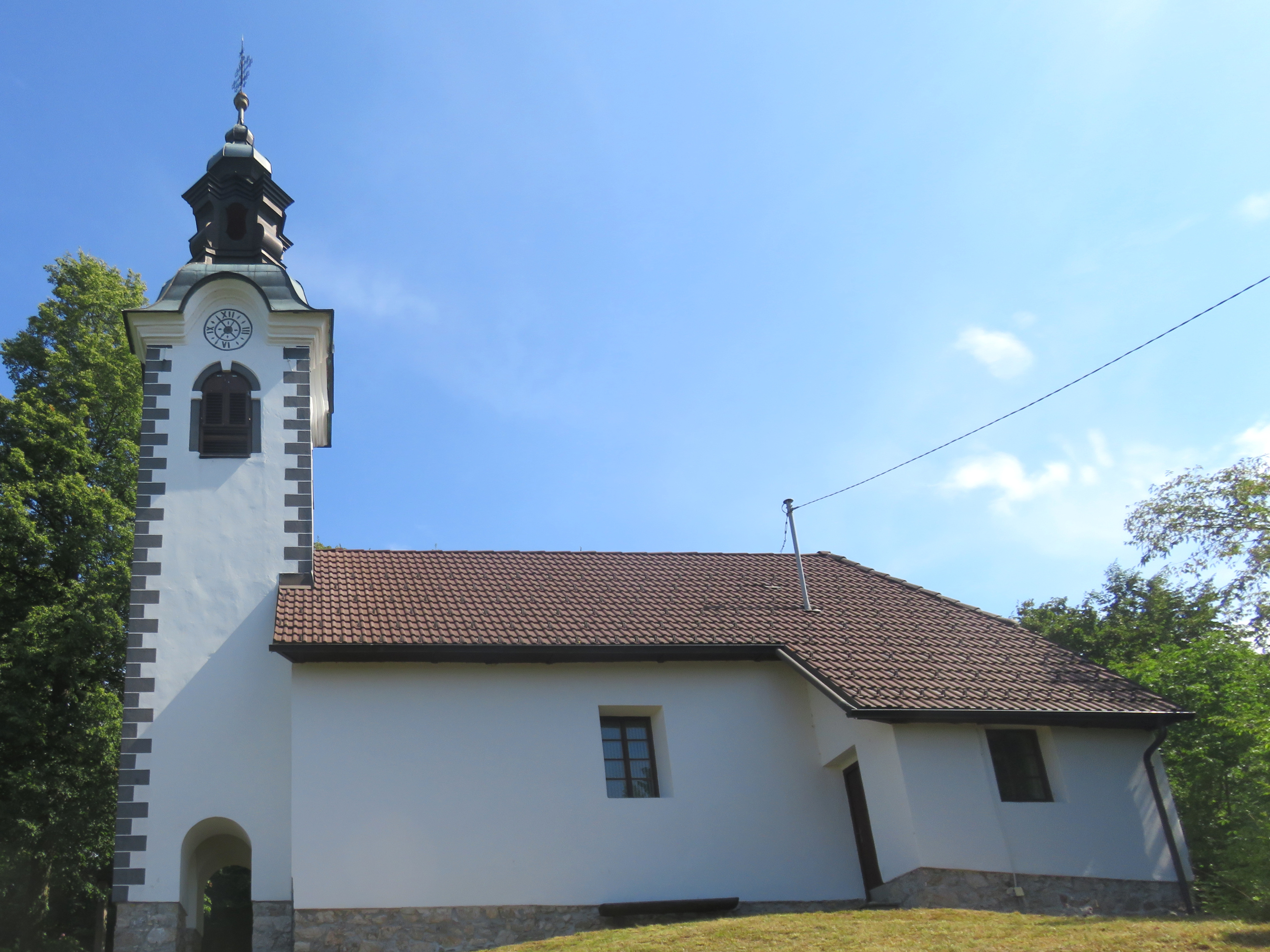
Saint Mary Magdalene's Church

The local church is dedicated to Mary Magdalene and belongs to the Parish of Šmartno. The original 18th-century church was demolished in 1945. The new church, built according to plans by the architect Jože Plečnik, was consecrated in 1979.
