= Gradišče nad Prvačino =

Gradišče nad Prvačino Gradišče (until 1953) Gradišče pri Zalem Hribu (1953–1955)
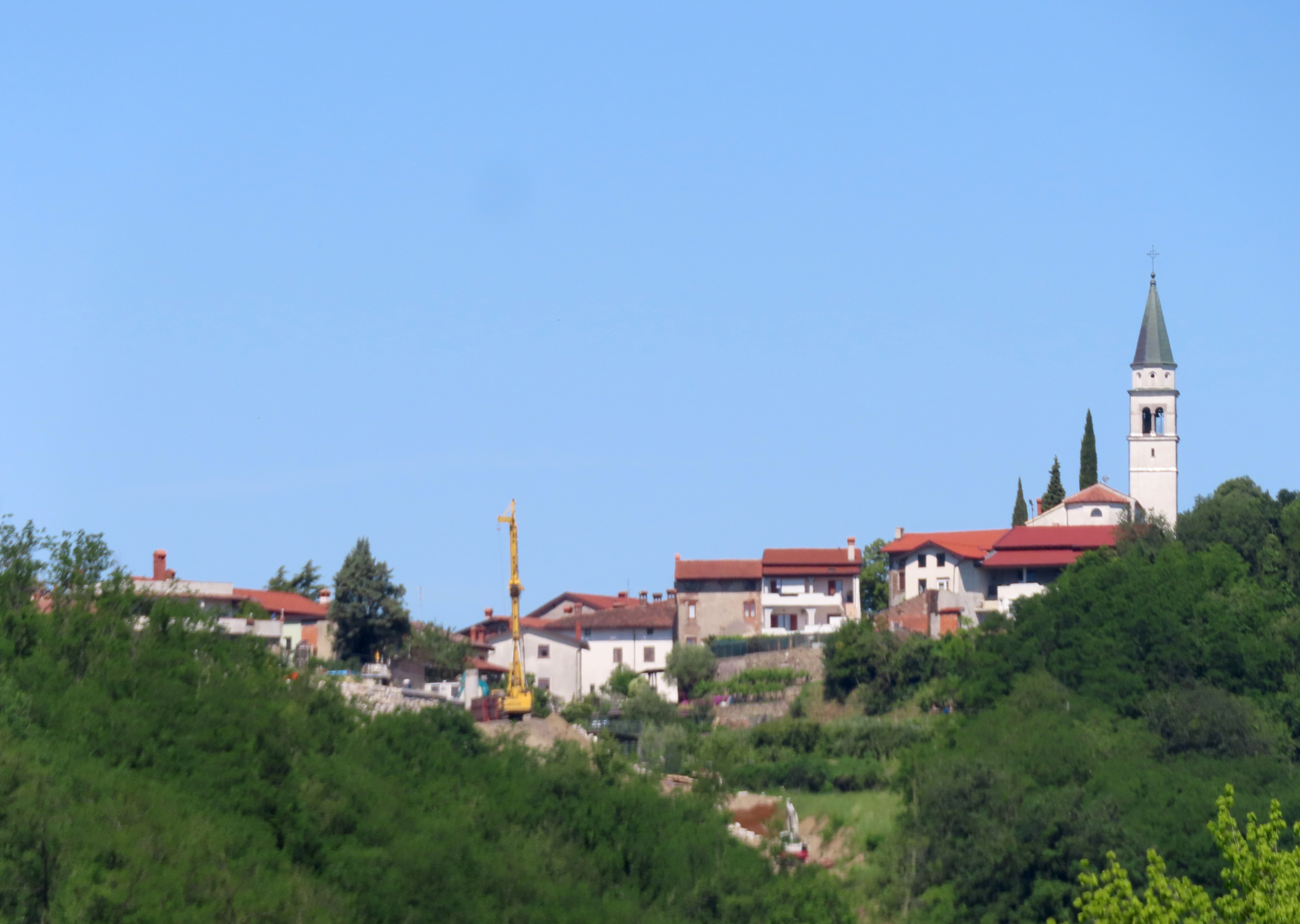

- Location in Slovenia
- Coordinates: 45°53′18.05″N 13°42′3.37″E
- Country: Slovenia
- Traditional region: Slovenian Littoral
- Statistical region: Gorizia
- Municipality: Nova Gorica

Area
  - Total: 1.74 km^{2} (0.67 sq mi)
- Elevation: 121.7 m (399 ft)

Population (2002)
  - Total: 476

Gradišče nad Prvačino (pronounced [ɡɾaˈdiːʃtʃɛ nat pəɾˈʋaːtʃinɔ]; Italian: Gradiscutta in Val Vipacco) is a village in western Slovenia in the Municipality of Nova Gorica. It is located in the Vipava Valley in the Gorizia region and is a satellite settlement of Prvačina.

== Name ==
The name of the settlement was changed from Gradišče to Gradišče pri Zalem Hribu in 1953. It was then changed from Gradišče pri Zalem Hribu to Gradišče nad Prvačino in 1955.

== Church ==
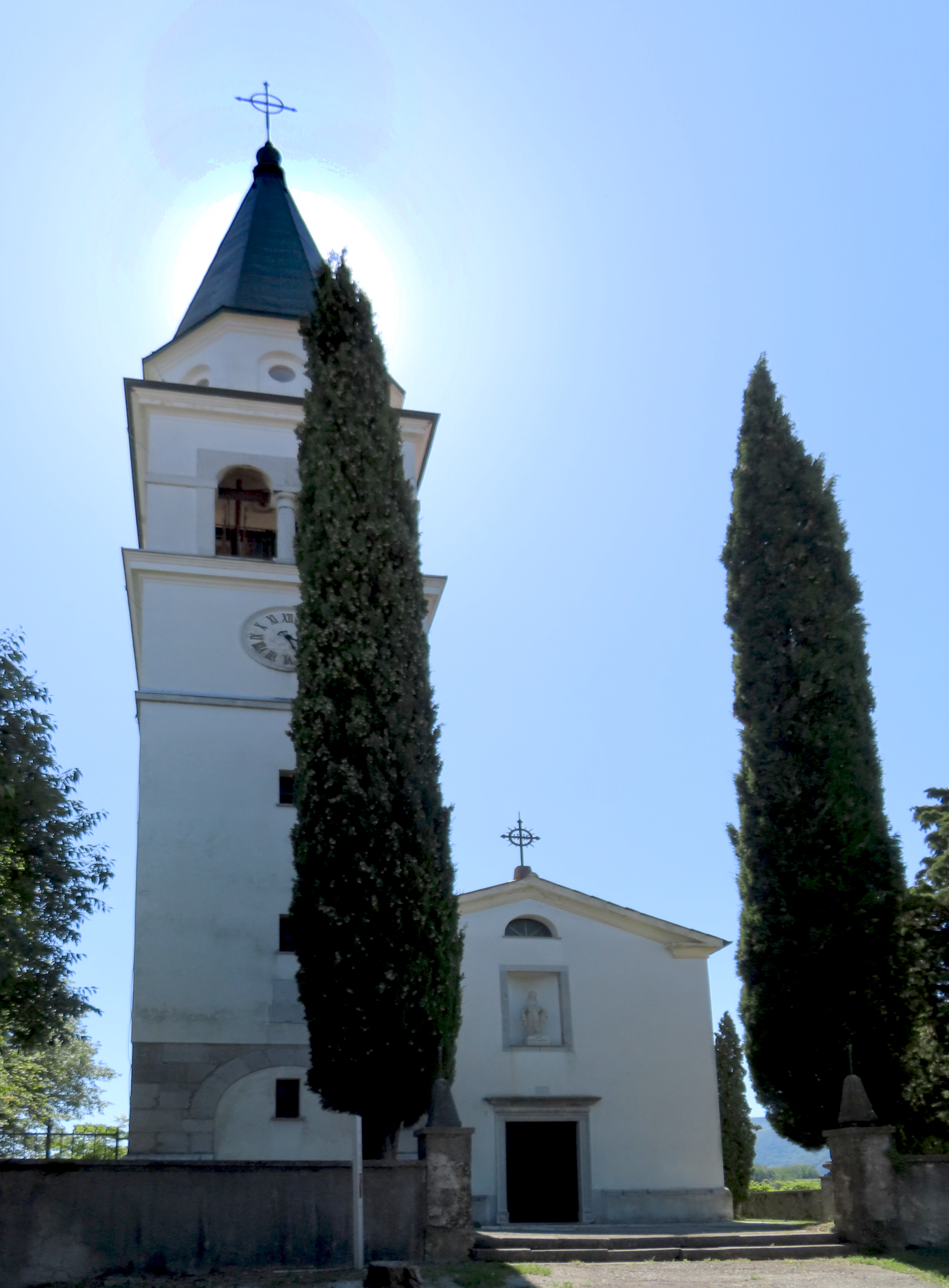
Immaculate Conception Church

The parish church in the settlement is dedicated to the Virgin Mary and belongs to the Diocese of Koper.

== Notable people ==
Notable people that were born or lived in Gradišče nad Prvačino include:

- Simon Gregorčič (1844–1906), Slovene poet, lived in Gradišče nad Prvačino from 1882 to 1903
- Josip Tominc (1790–1866), Italian-Slovene painter
