= Gradišče, Grosuplje =

Gradišče
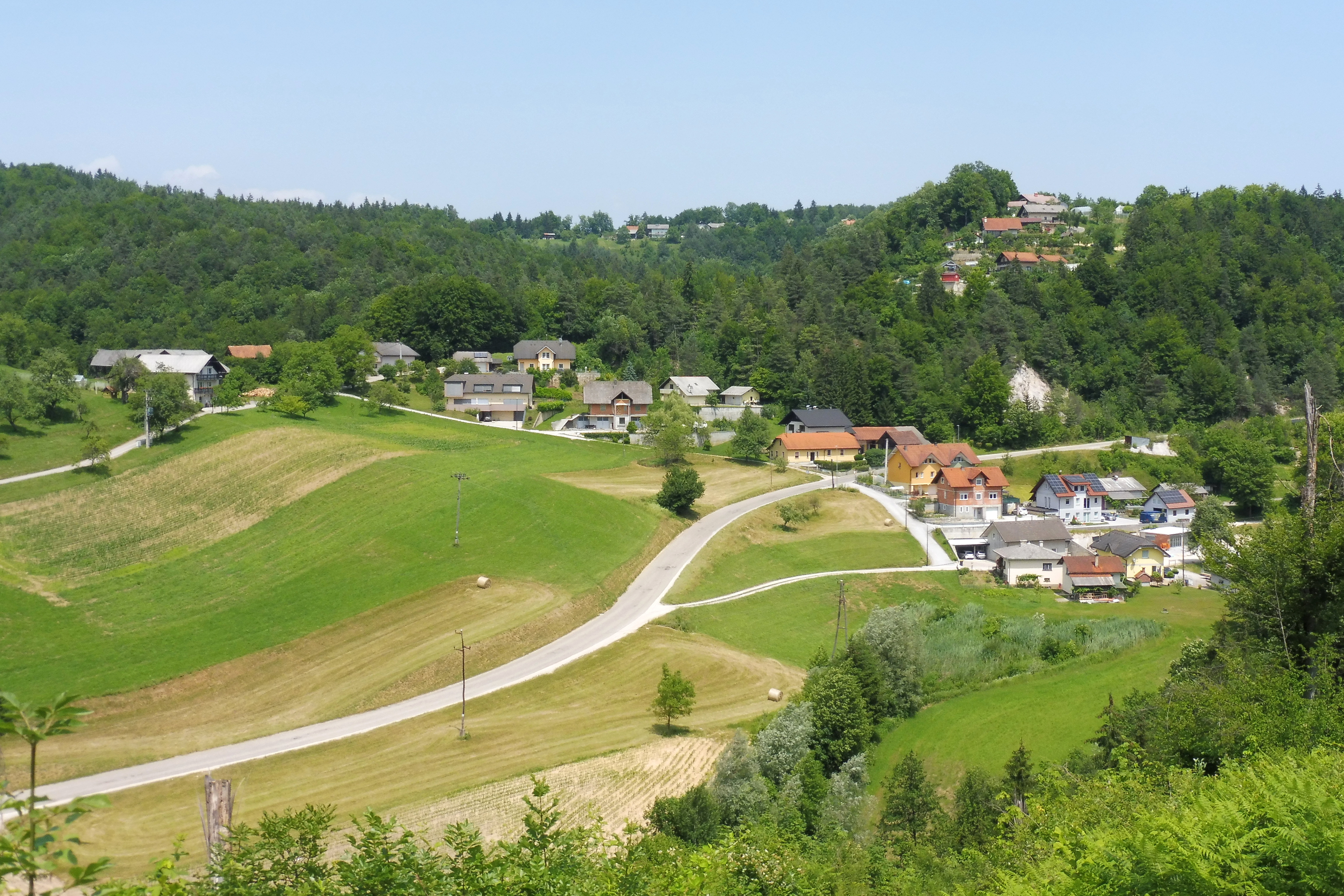

- Location in Slovenia
- Coordinates: 45°58′56.34″N 14°41′39.25″E
- Country: Slovenia
- Traditional region: Lower Carniola
- Statistical region: Central Slovenia
- Municipality: Grosuplje

Area
  - Total: 0.49 km^{2} (0.19 sq mi)
- Elevation: 390 m (1,280 ft)

Population (2020)
  - Total: 79
  - Density: 160/km^{2} (410/sq mi)
- Time zone: UTC+1 (CET)
  - Summer (DST): UTC+2 (CET)
- Postal code: 1290 Grosuplje

Gradišče (pronounced [ɡɾaˈdiːʃtʃɛ]), sometimes referred to as Gradišče pri Polici, is a small settlement in the Municipality of Grosuplje in central Slovenia. The area is part of the historical region of Lower Carniola, with its community being tied to the large neighboring village of Polica. The municipality is included in the Central Slovenia Statistical Region.

== Big Creek retention basin ==
In 2022, a large retention basin was built along Big Creek west of the village to prevent flooding in Grosuplje.

== Geography ==
Gradišče lies at the hilly end of the valley of Big Creek (Slovene: Veliki potok), which extends to the northeast from Grosuplje. Gradišče Hill (elevation: 427 meters or 1,401 feet) rises northwest of the village. There is a large gravel pit in the village. A spring with potable water lies below the gravel pit in a valley called Pasja dolina (literally, 'dog valley').

== Name ==
The name Gradišče means 'hill fort', referring to an Iron Age fortification that stood at the top of Gradišče Hill. Gradišče is a relatively frequent toponym in Slovenia, referring to locations where such fortifications and similar structures stood. The same sematic motivation is found in related toponyms of Slavic origin: Italian Gradisca d'Isonzo, Romanian Horodiște, Russian Gorodishche, Serbian Gradište, and Ukrainian Horodyshche.

== History ==
During the time of the Ottoman raids in Europe, there was a walled stronghold in Gradišče; the microtoponym Pod taborom (literally, 'below the stronghold') in the nearby woods recalls this structure. Gradišče became a separate settlement in 1992 by splitting away from Velika Stara Vas.

== Cultural heritage ==
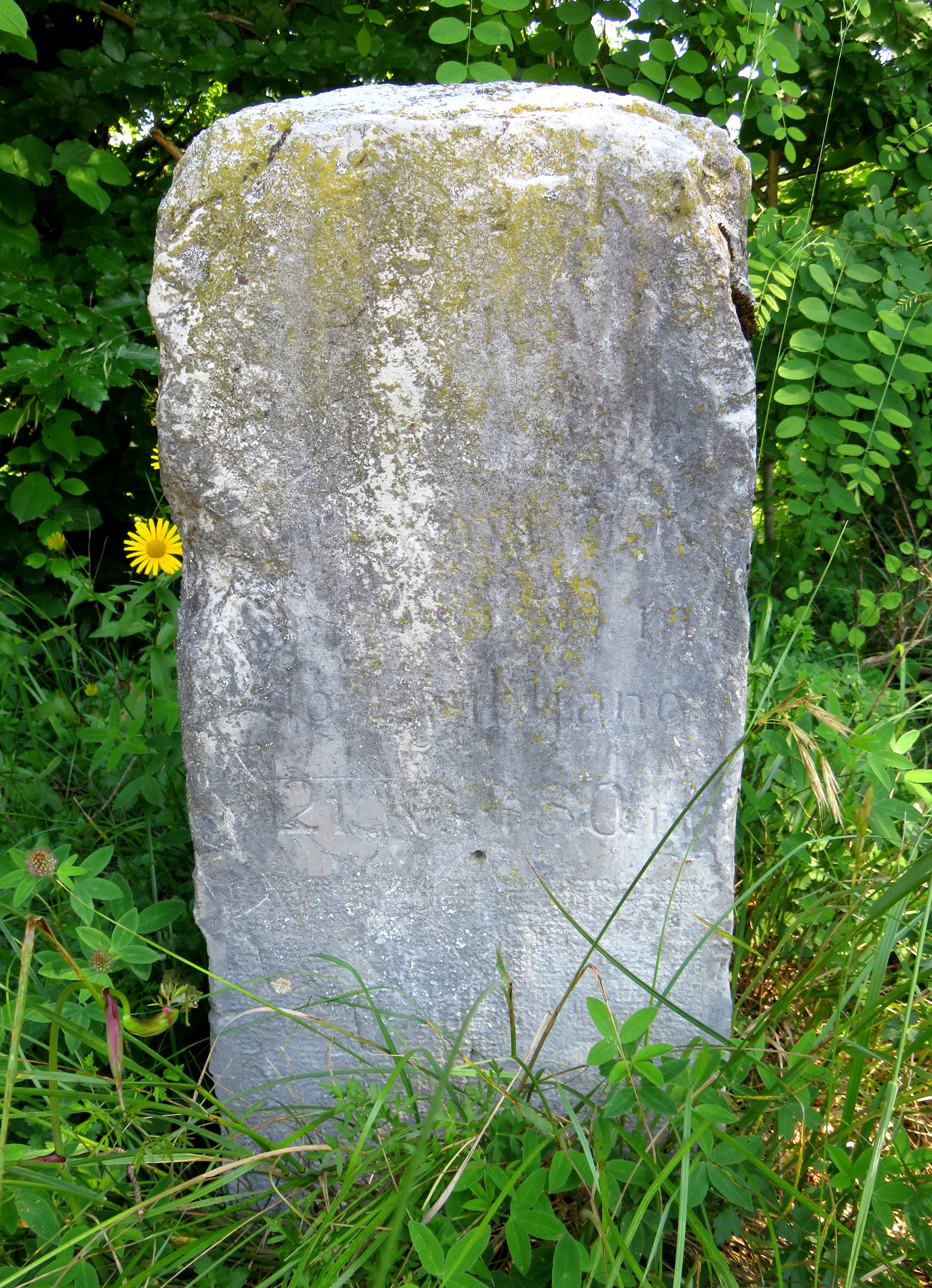
Milestone above Gradišče

Archaeological evidence shows that Gradišče was the location of an Iron Age hill fort. The fort was later torn down, with its stones being used to build the Polica church. There is a 19th-century milestone above the village.
