= Gradišče, Velike Lašče =

Gradišče
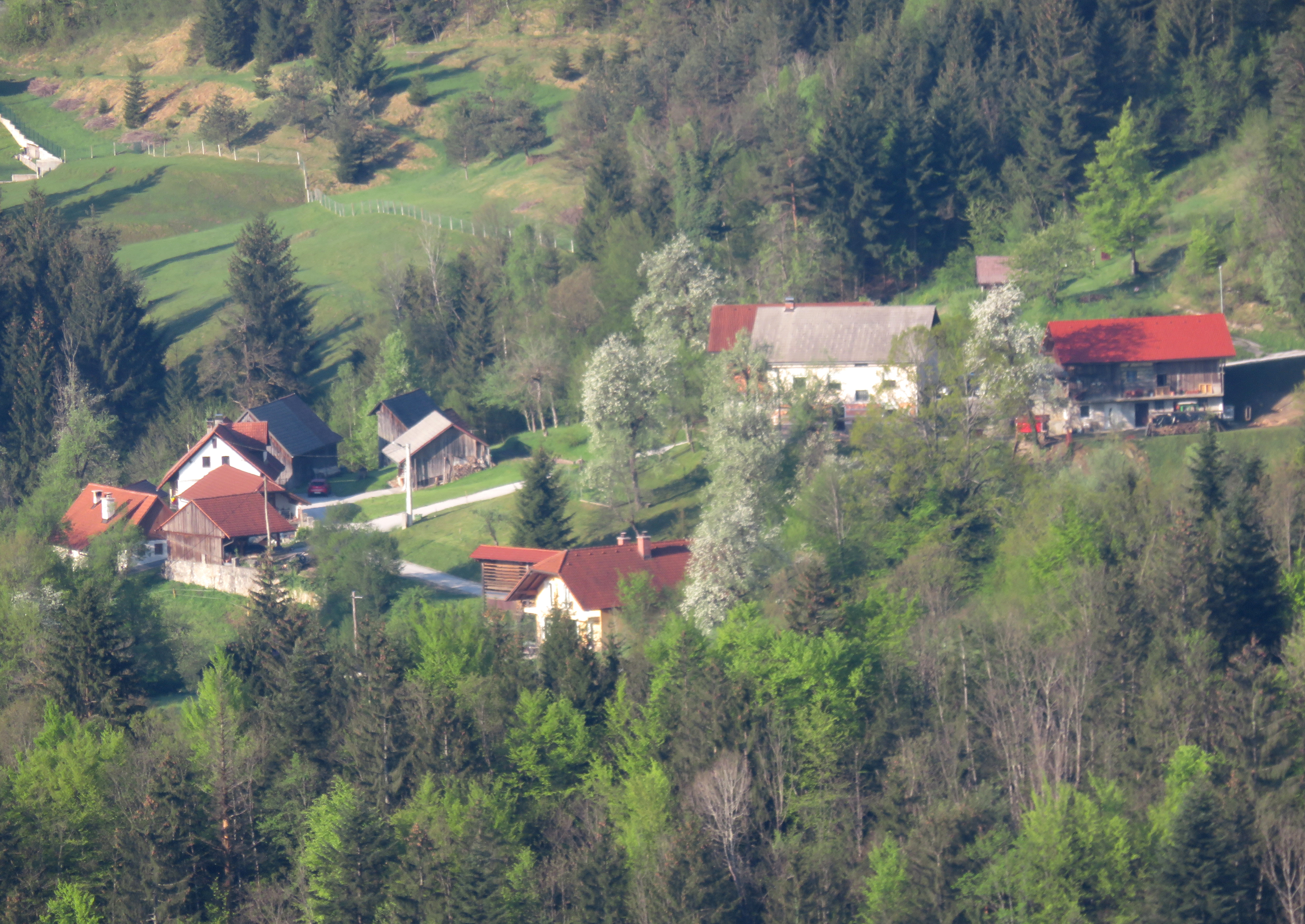

- Location in Slovenia
- Coordinates: 45°50′33.55″N 14°34′31.88″E
- Country: Slovenia
- Traditional region: Lower Carniola
- Statistical region: Central Slovenia
- Municipality: Velike Lašče

Area
  - Total: 0.23 km^{2} (0.089 sq mi)
- Elevation: 507 m (1,663 ft)

Population (2002)
  - Total: 7
- Postal code: 1314

Gradišče (pronounced [ɡɾaˈdiːʃtʃɛ]) is a small settlement south of Rob in the Municipality of Velike Lašče in central Slovenia. It is part of the traditional region of Lower Carniola and is now included in the Central Slovenia Statistical Region.
