= Gradišče v Tuhinju =

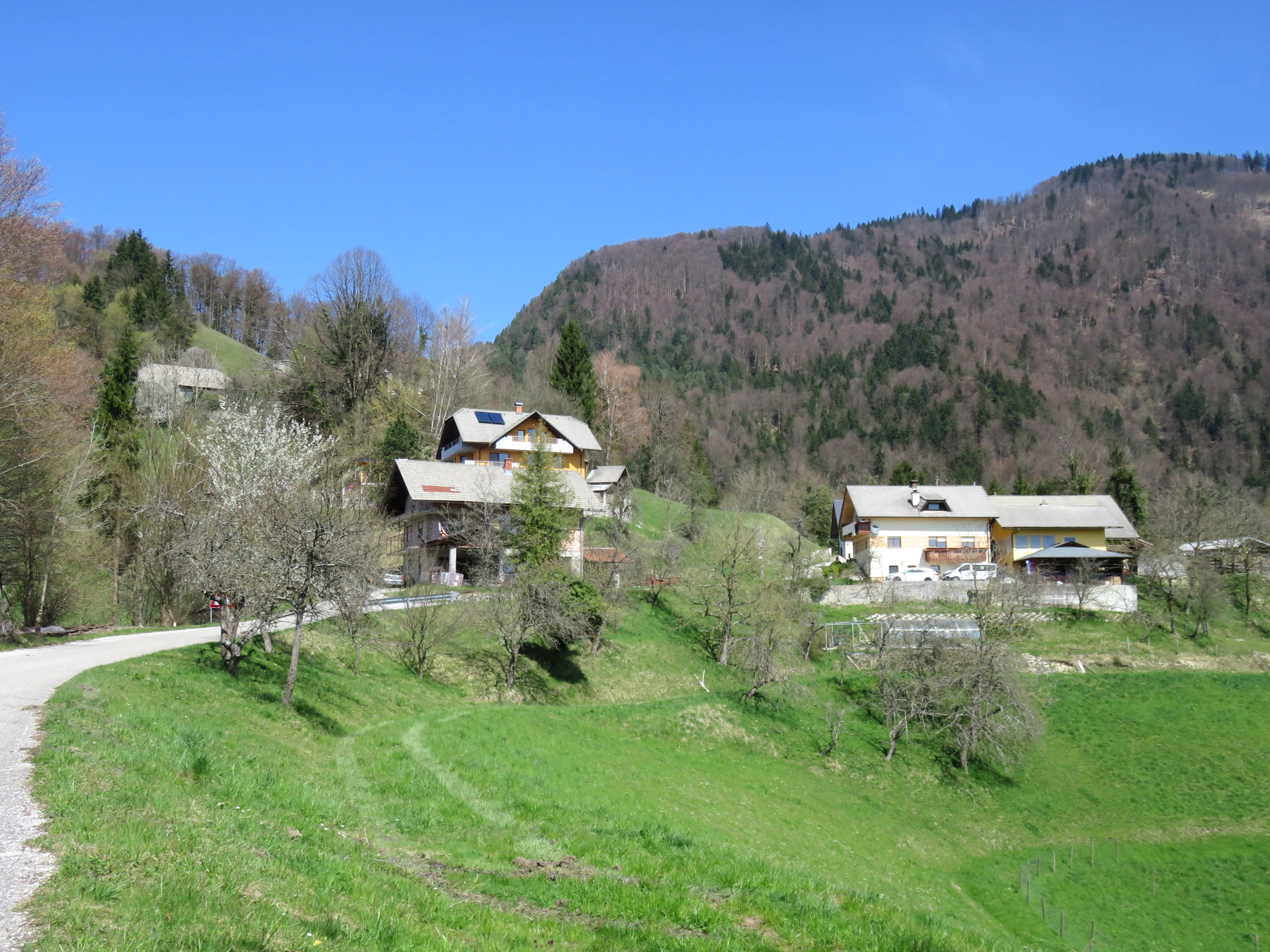

- Location in Slovenia
- Coordinates: 46°13′48.41″N 14°43′56.22″E
- Country: Slovenia
- Traditional region: Upper Carniola
- Statistical region: Central Slovenia
- Municipality: Kamnik
- Elevation: 593.6 m (1,948 ft)

Population (2002)
  - Total: 50

Gradišče v Tuhinju (pronounced [ɡɾaˈdiːʃtʃɛ ʍ tuˈxiːinju]) is a small settlement in the Tuhinj Valley in the Municipality of Kamnik in the Upper Carniola region of Slovenia. It includes the hamlet of Hom (in older sources also Holm).

== Name ==
The name of the settlement was changed from Gradišče to Gradišče v Tuhinju in 1953.

== Church ==
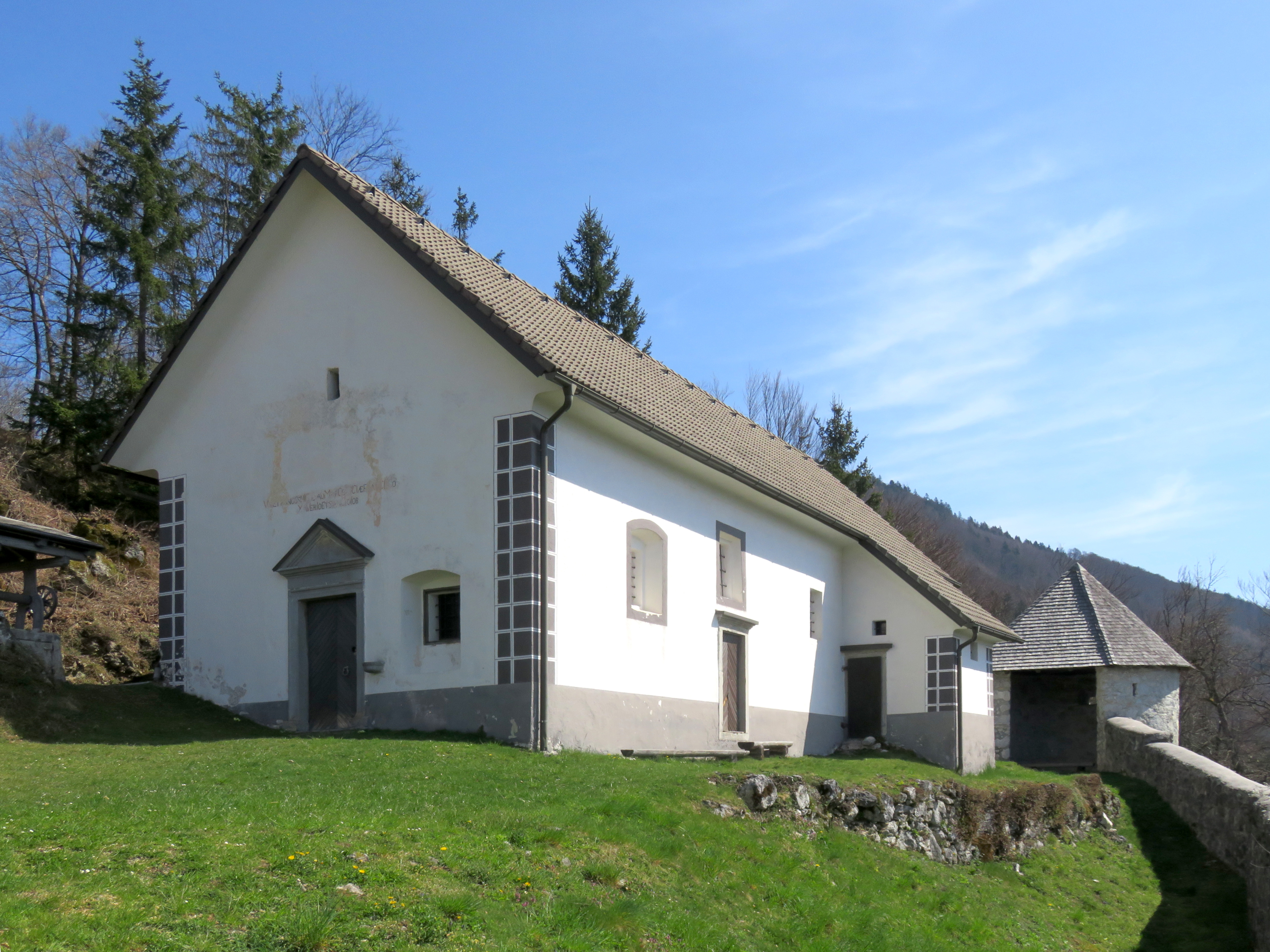
View from the southwest

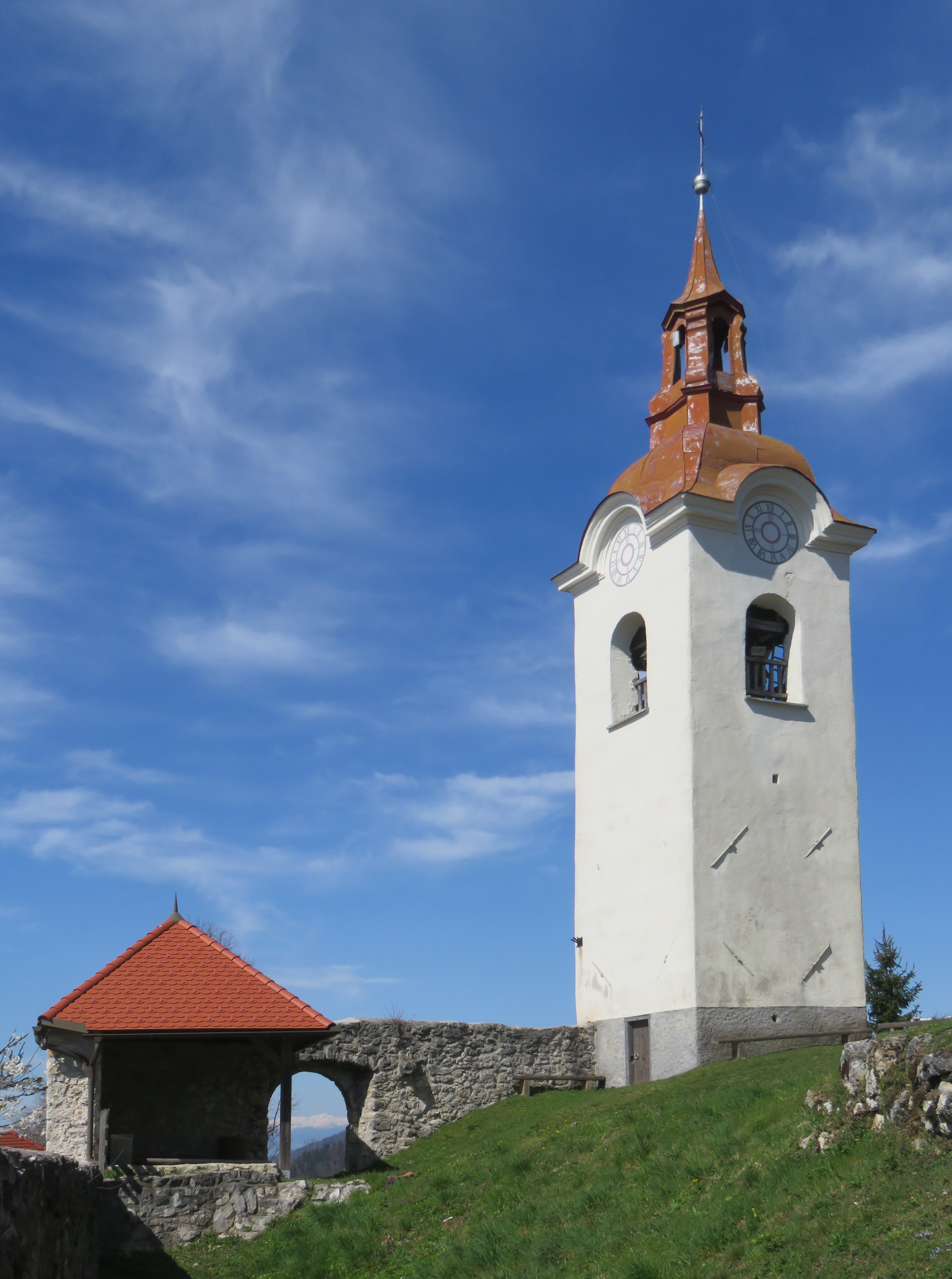
Bell tower and wall

Saint Nicholas's Church

On a hill above the village stands a church dedicated to Saint Nicholas. It has wooden Baroque altars, a painted wooden ceiling, and frescoes from the second half of the 18th century. The church used to be fortified against the Ottoman raids, and one defense tower is still visible.
