= Gradišče pri Trebnjem =

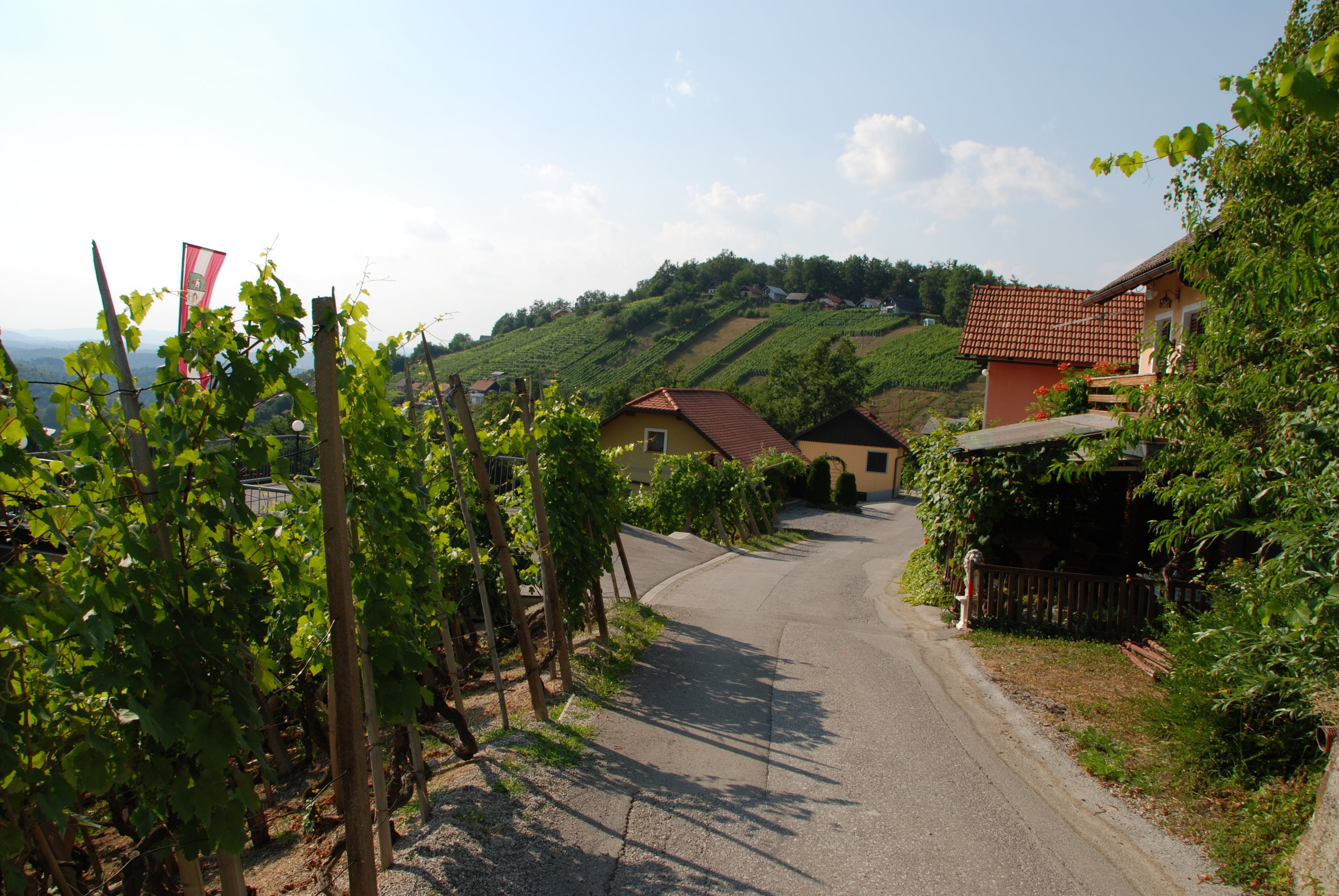

- Location in Slovenia
- Coordinates: 45°55′12.91″N 15°4′16.63″E
- Country: Slovenia
- Traditional region: Lower Carniola
- Statistical region: Southeast Slovenia
- Municipality: Trebnje

Area
  - Total: 1.9 km^{2} (0.73 sq mi)
- Elevation: 398.2 m (1,306 ft)

Population (2002)
  - Total: 31

Gradišče pri Trebnjem (pronounced [ɡɾaˈdiːʃtʃɛ pɾi ˈtɾeːbnjɛm]) is a village in the Municipality of Trebnje in eastern Slovenia. The area is part of the historical region of Lower Carniola. The municipality is now included in the Southeast Slovenia Statistical Region.

== Name ==
The name of the settlement was changed from Gradišče to Gradišče pri Trebnjem in 1953.

== Cultural heritage ==
A prehistoric hillfort dated to the late Bronze Age has been identified at the settlement. The name Gradišče itself suggests the existence of a fortified prehistoric settlement, and an archaeological survey in 1989 confirmed and dated the site.

In 1936 a chapel dedicated to Saint Joseph was built in the settlement.
