= Lake Kreda =

Lake in Slovenia

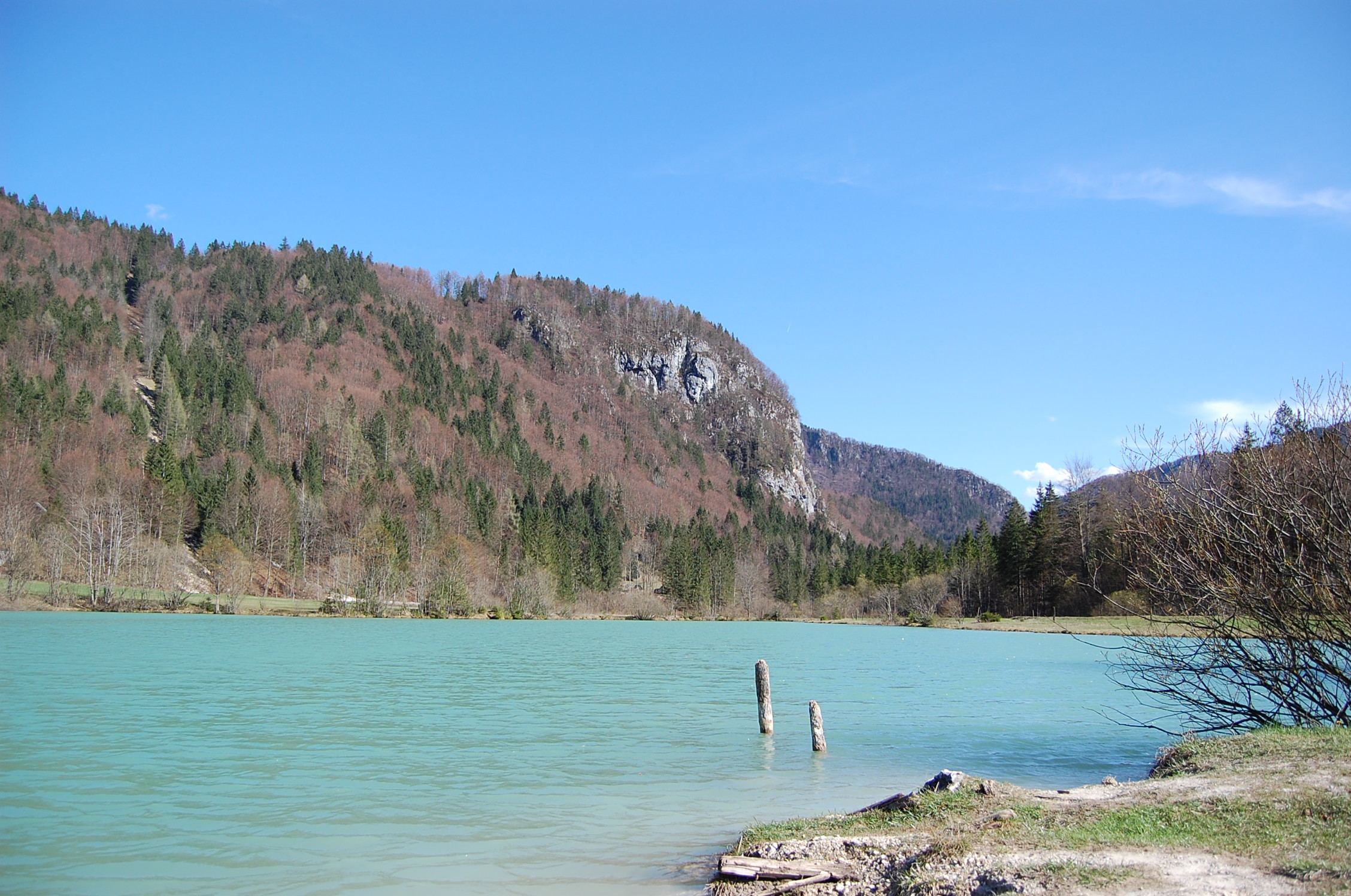

- Location within Slovenia
- Location: Triglav National Park, Upper Carniola, Slovenia
- Coordinates: 46°24′59″N 13°59′30″E
- Basin countries: Slovenia

Lake Kreda is a man-made lake in the Radovna Valley in northwestern Slovenia. The lake got its name from the chalk (Slovene: kreda) that was mined in the area until 1985. The digging also created a basin, which gradually filled with water and the lake appeared. The mining ceased because it was unprofitable and due to conservation concerns (the area is within Triglav National Park), but the lake remained and is now occasionally used as a recreation site.

Today, the lake and its surrounding wetlands are an important habitat for amphibians, such as the common frog and the common toad in the Radovna Valley.
