= Lake Gradišče =

Lake in Slovenia

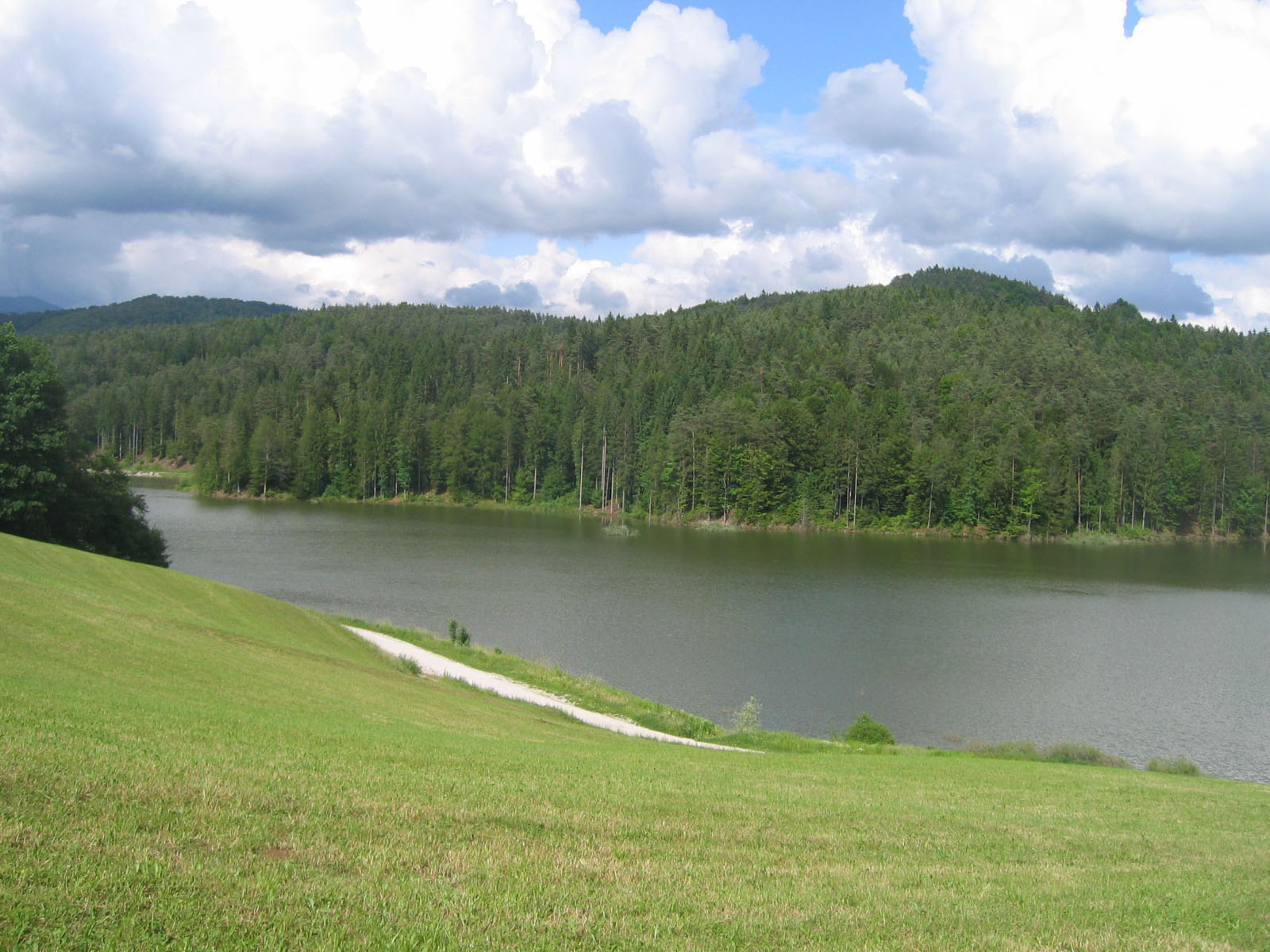

- Location within Slovenia
- Coordinates: 46°9′32″N 14°42′34″E
- Basin countries: Slovenia

Lake Gradišče (Slovene: Gradiško jezero) is a lake near Lukovica in Slovenia.
