= Poljane =

Poljane may refer to the following places:

In Croatia:

- Poljane, Brod-Posavina County, a village near Dragalić
- Poljane, Primorje-Gorski Kotar County, a village near Opatija

In Kosovo:

- Poljane, Istok, a settlement in the Municipality of Istok

In Serbia:

- Poljane (Obrenovac), a village in the Municipality of Obrenovac

In Slovenia:

- Dolenje Poljane, a settlement in the Municipality of Loška Dolina, southern Slovenia
- Kočevske Poljane, a settlement in the Municipality of Dolenjske Toplice (named Poljane until 1953), southeastern Slovenia
- Male Poljane, a settlement in the Municipality of Škocjan, southeastern Slovenia
- Poljane, Cerkno, a settlement in the Municipality of Cerkno, western Slovenia
- Poljane nad Blagovico, a settlement in the Municipality of Lukovica, central Slovenia
- Poljane nad Škofjo Loko, a settlement in the Municipality of Gorenja Vas–Poljane, northwestern Slovenia
- Poljane pri Podgradu, a settlement in the Municipality of Hrpelje–Kozina, southwestern Slovenia
- Poljane pri Štjaku, a settlement in the Municipality of Sežana, southwestern Slovenia
- Poljane, Rečica ob Savinji, a settlement in the Municipality of Rečica ob Savinji, central-eastern Slovenia
- Velike Poljane, Ribnica, a settlement in the Municipality of Ribnica, southern Slovenia
- Velike Poljane, Škocjan, a settlement in the Municipality of Škocjan, southeastern Slovenia
- Poljane (Šentvid District), a former settlement in central Slovenia in the northwest part of Ljubljana

== See also ==
- Poljana (disambiguation)
