= Stara Vas =

Stara Vas (Slovene: Stara vas) may refer to several places in Slovenia and Croatia:

== Slovenia ==
- Dolenja Stara Vas, a settlement in the Municipality of Šentjernej, southeastern Slovenia
- Dolnja Stara Vas, a settlement in the Municipality of Škocjan, southeastern Slovenia
- Gorenja Stara Vas, a former settlement in the Municipality of Šentjernej, southeastern Slovenia
- Gornja Stara Vas, a settlement in the Municipality of Škocjan, southeastern Slovenia
- Mala Stara Vas, a settlement in the Municipality of Grosuplje, central Slovenia
- Stara Nova Vas, a settlement in the Municipality of Križevci, northeastern Slovenia
- Stara Vas–Bizeljsko, a settlement in the Municipality of Municipality of Brežice, eastern Slovenia
- Stara Vas, Krško, a former settlement in the Municipality of Krško, eastern Slovenia
- Stara Vas, Postojna, a settlement in the Municipality of Postojna, southwestern Slovenia
- Stara Vas, Žiri, a former settlement in the Municipality of Žiri, western Slovenia
- Velika Stara Vas, a settlement in the Municipality of Grosuplje, central Slovenia

== Croatia ==
- Stara Vas, Croatia, a settlement on the island of Pag
