= Gorenje Dole =

Gorenje Dole is a Slovene place name that may refer to:

- Gorenje Dole, Krško, a village in the Municipality of Krško, southeastern Slovenia
- Gorenje Dole, Škocjan, a village in the Municipality of Škocjan, southeastern Slovenia
