= Zavinek =

- Location in Slovenia
- Coordinates: 45°54′11.96″N 15°17′59.65″E
- Country: Slovenia
- Traditional region: Lower Carniola
- Statistical region: Southeast Slovenia
- Municipality: Škocjan

Area
  - Total: 0.86 km^{2} (0.33 sq mi)
- Elevation: 180.1 m (591 ft)

Population (2002)
  - Total: 62

Zavinek (pronounced [zaˈʋiːnək]; in older sources also Zavinjak, locally also Savinek) is a small settlement south of Škocjan in the traditional region of Lower Carniola in southeastern Slovenia. Within the Municipality of Škocjan, it belongs to the Local Community of Škocjan. The area is part of the Southeast Slovenia Statistical Region.

== Geography ==
The village consists of two parts, Dolnji Zavinek (literally, 'lower Zavinek') to the northwest and Gornji Zavinek (literally, 'upper Zavinek') to the southeast. It also includes the hamlet of Bajnof to the west, along the road to Škocjan. The soil is characterized by mor humus to the east, whereas there is loamy soil to the north. There are tilled fields to the east, northwest, and southwest, as well as meadows. The Zavinek Valley (Slovene: Zavinska dolina) extends into the forest to the northeast, on the margins of which there are springs: Kapler Spring (Kaplerjev studenec), Bregar Spring (Bregarjev studenec), and Upper Spring (Gorenji studenec).
