= Hudenje =

- Location in Slovenia
- Coordinates: 45°53′25.41″N 15°19′21.97″E
- Country: Slovenia
- Traditional region: Lower Carniola
- Statistical region: Southeast Slovenia
- Municipality: Škocjan

Area
  - Total: 1.17 km^{2} (0.45 sq mi)
- Elevation: 169.4 m (556 ft)

Population (2002)
  - Total: 58

Hudenje (pronounced [xuˈdeːnjɛ]) is a small settlement east of Dobruška Vas in the Municipality of Škocjan in southeastern Slovenia. The area is part of the historical region of Lower Carniola and is now included in the Southeast Slovenia Statistical Region. Within the municipality, the village belongs to the Village Community of Grmovlje.
