= Dolenje Radulje =

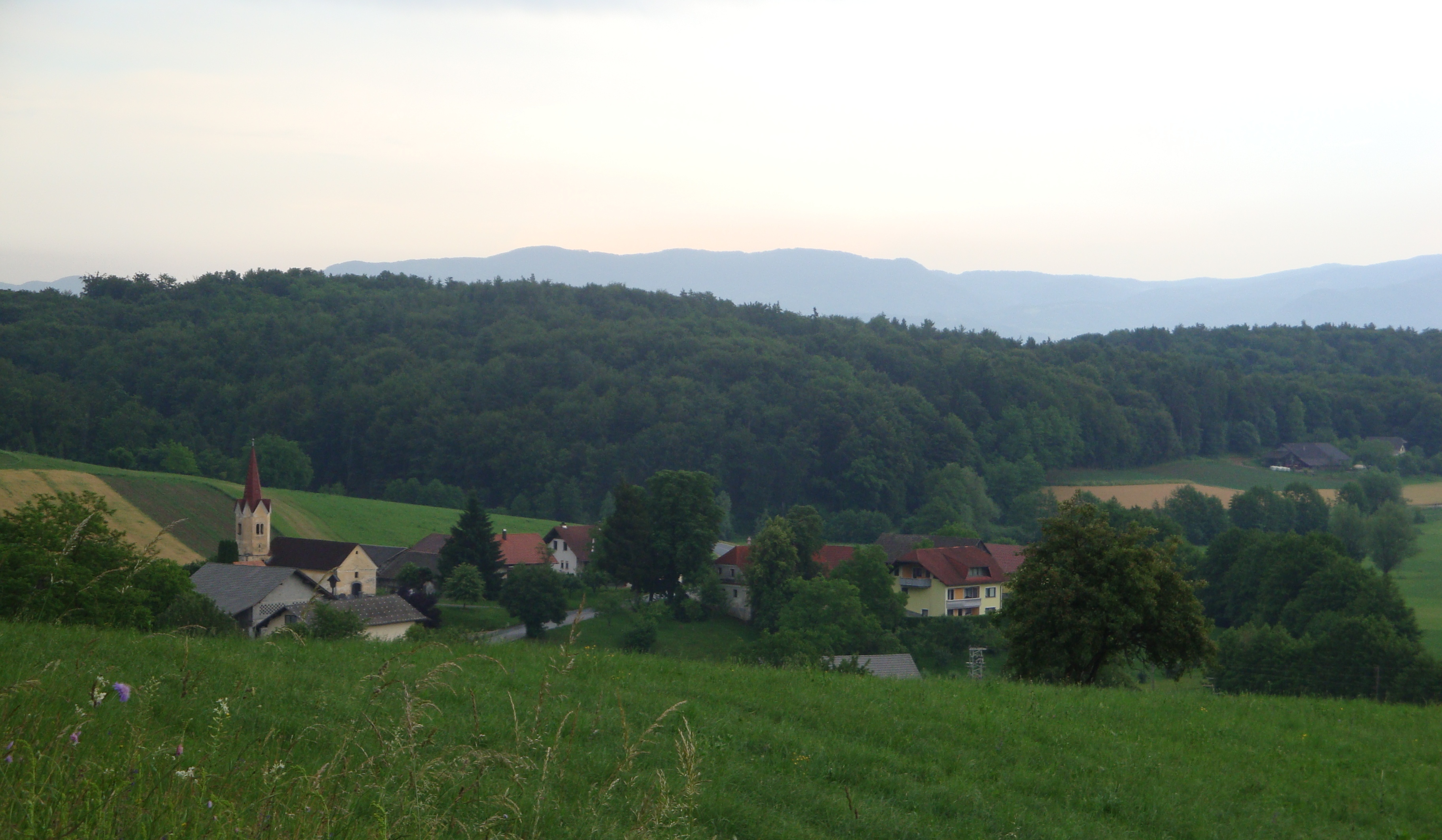

- Location in Slovenia
- Coordinates: 45°56′5.95″N 15°20′6.08″E
- Country: Slovenia
- Traditional region: Lower Carniola
- Statistical region: Southeast Slovenia
- Municipality: Škocjan

Area
  - Total: 2.24 km^{2} (0.86 sq mi)
- Elevation: 191.4 m (628 ft)

Population (2002)
  - Total: 79

Dolenje Radulje (pronounced [dɔˈleːnjɛ ˈɾaːduljɛ]; in older sources also Dolenje Radovlje, German: Unterradelstein) is a village in the Municipality of Škocjan in southeastern Slovenia. Within the municipality, it belongs to the Local Community of Bučka. The area is part of the historical region of Lower Carniola. The municipality is now included in the Southeast Slovenia Statistical Region.

== Radelstein Castle ==
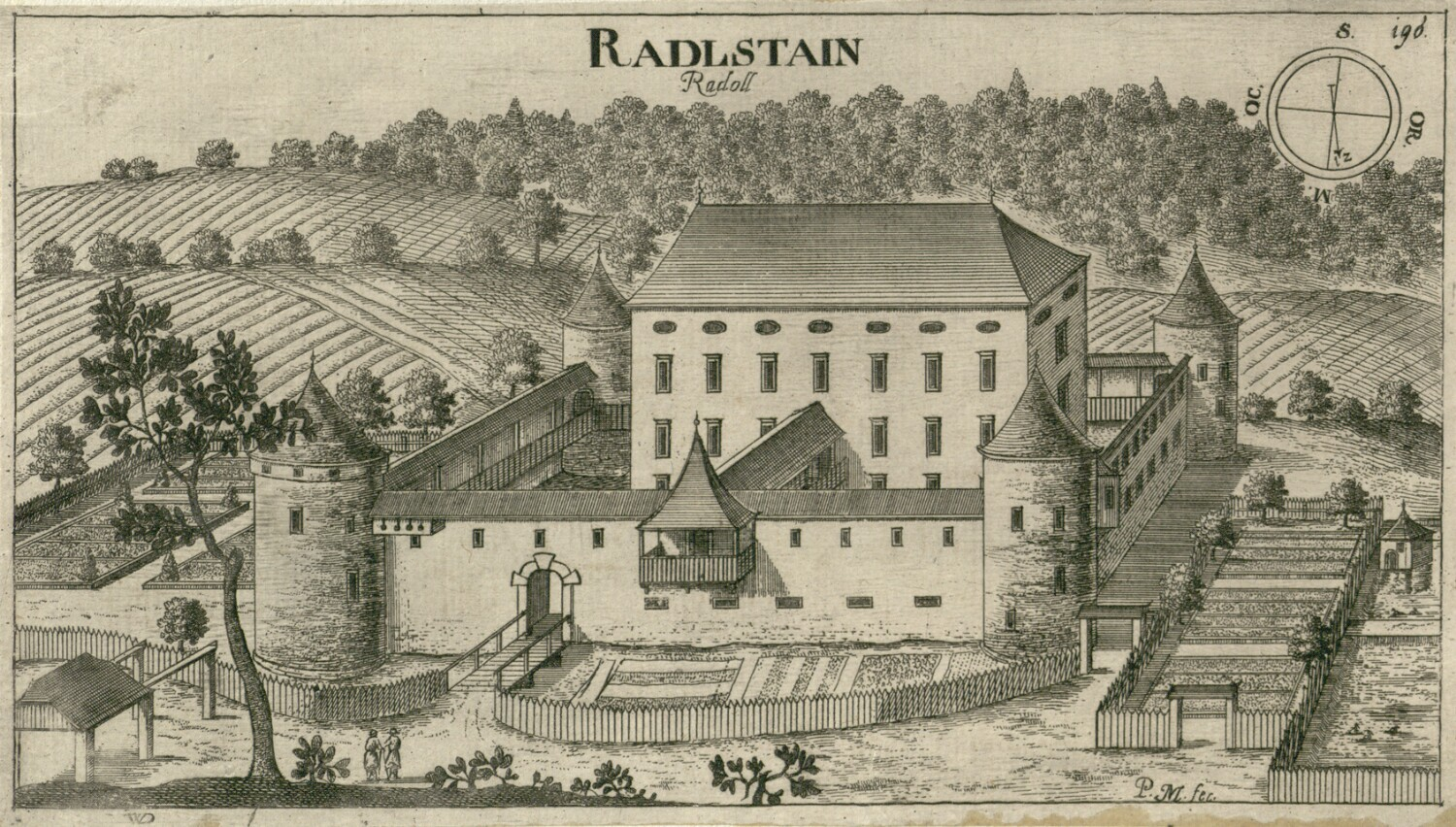
Radelstein Castle, as depicted in a copper engraving in 1679 by Johann Weikhard von Valvasor

The ruins of Radelstein Castle (Slovene: Radelca, Radelštajn, or Rajtšole) stand in the valley between the hamlet of Sela and Senica Hill. The castle was built in the 16th century by the Sauraui noble family. During the Second World War, German forces maintained stalls at the castle where livestock were taken after the local inhabitants were expelled in order to make room for new ethnic German settlers from Gottschee. The castle was burned by the Partisans in October 1943. The damage from the fire was exacerbated by stockpiles of gasoline at the castle, which were also burned.

== Church ==
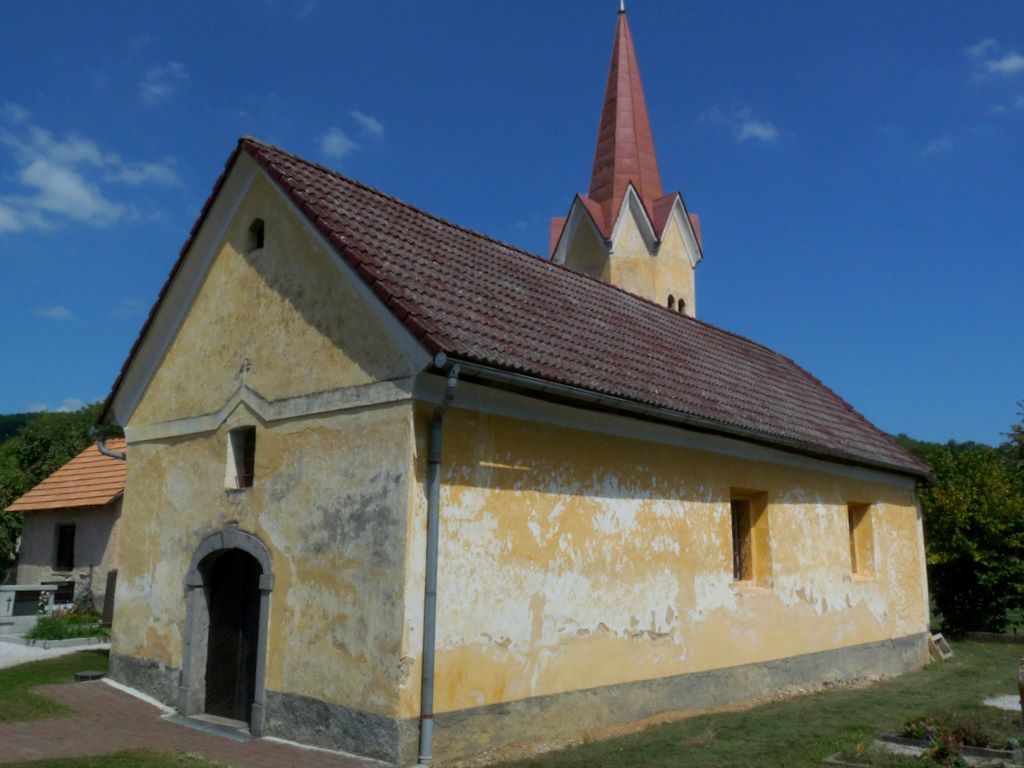
St. Michael's Church in Dolenje Radulje

The local church is dedicated to Saint Michael and belongs to the Parish of Bučka. It was first mentioned in written documents dating to 1526.

== Notable people ==
Notable people that were born or lived in Dolenje Radulje include:

- Josip Wester (1874–1960), literary historian
