= Zalog pri Škocjanu =

- Location in Slovenia
- Coordinates: 45°54′31.42″N 15°15′38.69″E
- Country: Slovenia
- Traditional region: Lower Carniola
- Statistical region: Southeast Slovenia
- Municipality: Škocjan

Area
  - Total: 1.35 km^{2} (0.52 sq mi)
- Elevation: 166.8 m (547 ft)

Population (2002)
  - Total: 54

Zalog pri Škocjanu (pronounced [ˈzaːlɔk pɾi ʃkɔˈtsjaːnu]) is a small village west of Škocjan in the traditional region of Lower Carniola in southeastern Slovenia. Within the Municipality of Škocjan, it belongs to the Local Community of Škocjan. The Municipality of Škocjan is part of the Southeast Slovenia Statistical Region.

== Name ==
The name of the settlement was changed from Zalog to Zalog pri Škocjanu in 1953.
