= Stara Bučka =

- Location in Slovenia
- Coordinates: 45°55′16.68″N 15°18′23.21″E
- Country: Slovenia
- Traditional region: Lower Carniola
- Statistical region: Southeast Slovenia
- Municipality: Škocjan

Area
  - Total: 2.95 km^{2} (1.14 sq mi)
- Elevation: 262.2 m (860 ft)

Population (2002)
  - Total: 101

Stara Bučka (pronounced [ˈstaːɾa ˈbuːtʃka]; German: Altbutschka) is a settlement in the Municipality of Škocjan in southeastern Slovenia, the traditional region of Lower Carniola. Within the municipality, it belongs to the Local Community of Škocjan. It lies between Škocjan and Bučka. The municipality is now included in the Southeast Slovenia Statistical Region.
