= Poljana =

Poljana may refer to:

- Poljana (newspaper), published in Estonia
- Poljana, Kamnik, a village in Slovenia
- Poljana, Prevalje, a village in Slovenia
- Poljana, Požega-Slavonia County, a village in Croatia
- Poljana, Primorje-Gorski Kotar County, a village near Vrbovsko, Croatia
- Poljana, Zadar County, a village on Ugljan, Croatia
- Poljana, Zagreb County, a village near Vrbovec, Croatia
- Poljana Križevačka, a village in Croatia
- Poljana Lekenička, a village in Croatia
- Poljana, Požarevac, a village in Braničevo District, Serbia
- Poljana, Plužine, a village near Plužine, Montenegro
- Poljana, Tuzla, a village in Bosnia and Herzegovina
- Poljana, Velika Kladuša, a village in Bosnia and Herzegovina

== See also ==
- Poljane (disambiguation)
