= Zaboršt, Škocjan =

Zaboršt
- Location in Slovenia
- Coordinates: 45°55′17.82″N 15°19′19.84″E
- Country: Slovenia
- Traditional region: Lower Carniola
- Statistical region: Southeast Slovenia
- Municipality: Škocjan

Area
  - Total: 1.39 km^{2} (0.54 sq mi)
- Elevation: 205 m (673 ft)

Population (2002)
  - Total: 39

Zaboršt (pronounced [zaˈbɔɾʃt]) is a settlement southeast of Bučka in the Municipality of Škocjan in southeastern Slovenia. Within the municipality, it belongs to the Local Community of Bučka. The municipality is historically part of Lower Carniola and is now included in the Southeast Slovenia Statistical Region.
