= Zloganje =

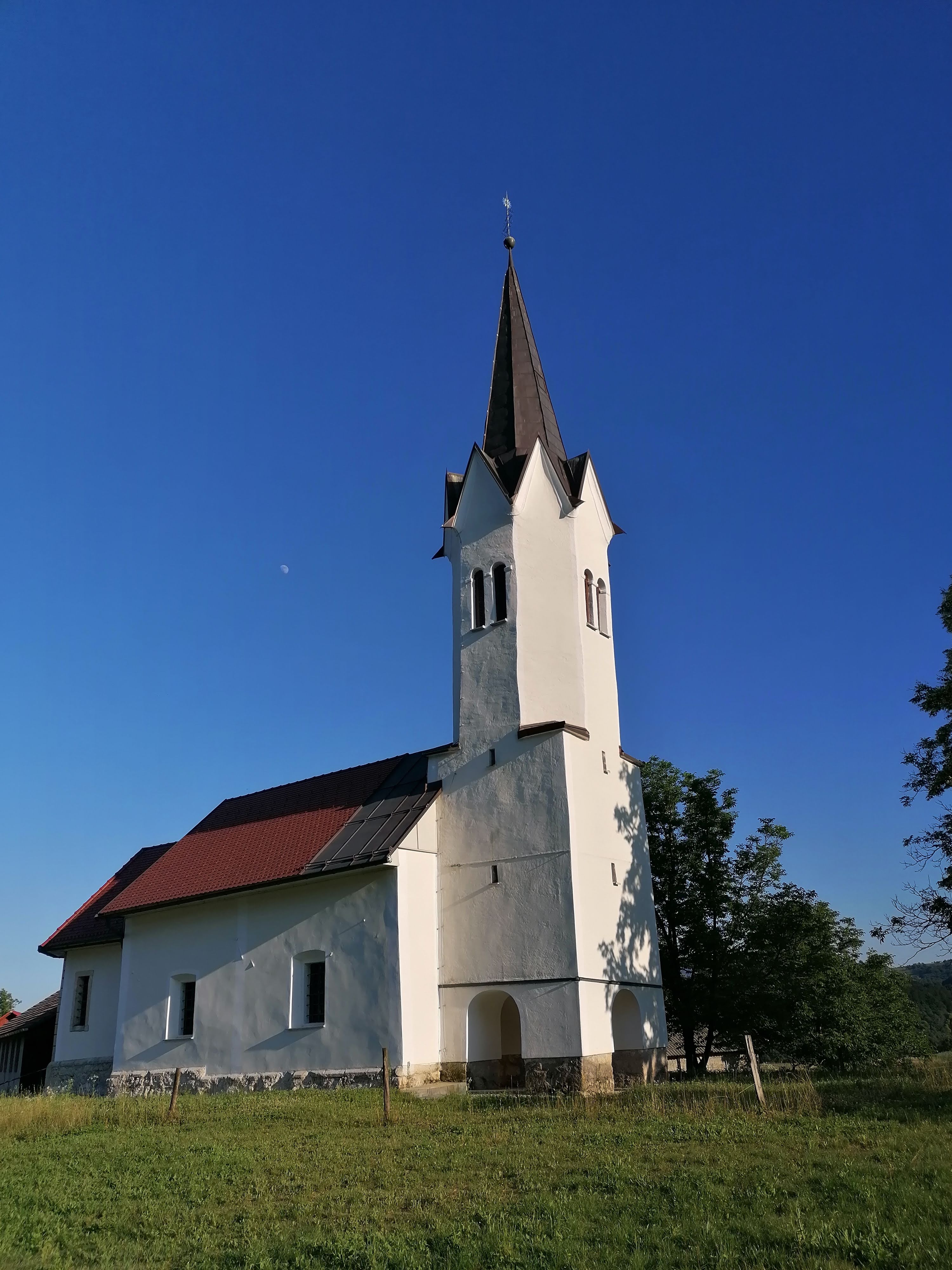

- Location in Slovenia
- Coordinates: 45°55′9.74″N 15°17′12.16″E
- Country: Slovenia
- Traditional region: Lower Carniola
- Statistical region: Southeast Slovenia
- Municipality: Škocjan

Area
  - Total: 1.3 km^{2} (0.50 sq mi)
- Elevation: 214.4 m (703 ft)

Population (2002)
  - Total: 134

Zloganje (pronounced [ˈzloːɡanjɛ]) is a village just north of Škocjan in the traditional region of Lower Carniola in southeastern Slovenia. Within the Municipality of Škocjan, it belongs to the Local Community of Škocjan. The Municipality of Škocjan is included in the Southeast Slovenia Statistical Region.

The local church is dedicated to the Visitation of Mary and belongs to the Parish of Škocjan. It is a medieval building that was restyled in the Baroque in the 18th century.
