= Segonje =

- Location in Slovenia
- Coordinates: 45°55′51.25″N 15°16′52.88″E
- Country: Slovenia
- Traditional region: Lower Carniola
- Statistical region: Southeast Slovenia
- Municipality: Škocjan

Area
  - Total: 0.94 km^{2} (0.36 sq mi)
- Elevation: 297.8 m (977 ft)

Population (2002)
  - Total: 22

Segonje (pronounced [ˈseːɡɔnjɛ]) is a small settlement in the hills north of Škocjan in southeastern Slovenia. The area is part of the historical region of Lower Carniola. Within the Municipality of Škocjan, it belongs to the Local Community of Škocjan. The entire Municipality of Škocjan is included in the Southeast Slovenia Statistical Region.
