= Mačkovec =

Mačkovec may refer to:

== Croatia ==
- Mačkovec, Croatia, a village near Čakovec in Međimurje County

== Slovenia ==
- Gorenji Mačkovec, a village in the Municipality of Kočevje
- Mačkovec, Kočevje, a village in the Municipality of Kočevje
- Mačkovec, Laško, a village in the Municipality of Laško
- Mačkovec pri Dvoru, a village in the Municipality of Žužemberk
- Mačkovec pri Škocjanu, a village in the Municipality of Škocjan
- Mačkovec pri Suhorju, a village in the Municipality of Metlika
- Mačkovec, Trebnje, a village in the Municipality of Trebnje
- Mačkovec, Novo Mesto, a local community in the Urban Municipality of Novo Mesto

== See also ==
- Mačkovac (disambiguation)
