= Jerman Vrh =

- Location in Slovenia
- Coordinates: 45°55′25.04″N 15°18′46″E
- Country: Slovenia
- Traditional region: Lower Carniola
- Statistical region: Southeast Slovenia
- Municipality: Škocjan

Area
  - Total: 0.59 km^{2} (0.23 sq mi)
- Elevation: 273.8 m (898 ft)

Population (2002)
  - Total: 52

Jerman Vrh (pronounced [ˈjeːɾmaɱ ˈʋəɾx]; in older sources also Jermanji Vrh) is a small settlement south of Bučka in the Municipality of Škocjan in southeastern Slovenia. Within the municipality, it belongs to the Local Community of Bučka. The area is part of the historical region of Lower Carniola. The municipality is now included in the Southeast Slovenia Statistical Region.
