= Polane =

Polane may refer to:

- Polonium hydride
- Polanë, the Albanian name for Poljane, a village in Kosovo
