= Hrastulje =

- Location in Slovenia
- Coordinates: 45°54′37.27″N 15°17′43.08″E
- Country: Slovenia
- Traditional region: Lower Carniola
- Statistical region: Southeast Slovenia
- Municipality: Škocjan

Area
  - Total: 0.79 km^{2} (0.31 sq mi)
- Elevation: 197.2 m (647 ft)

Population (2002)
  - Total: 162

Hrastulje (pronounced [xɾaˈstuːljɛ]) is a settlement just northeast of Škocjan in the historical region of Lower Carniola in southeastern Slovenia. Within the municipality, it belongs to the Local Community of Škocjan. The Municipality of Škocjan is included in the Southeast Slovenia Statistical Region.
