= Močvirje =

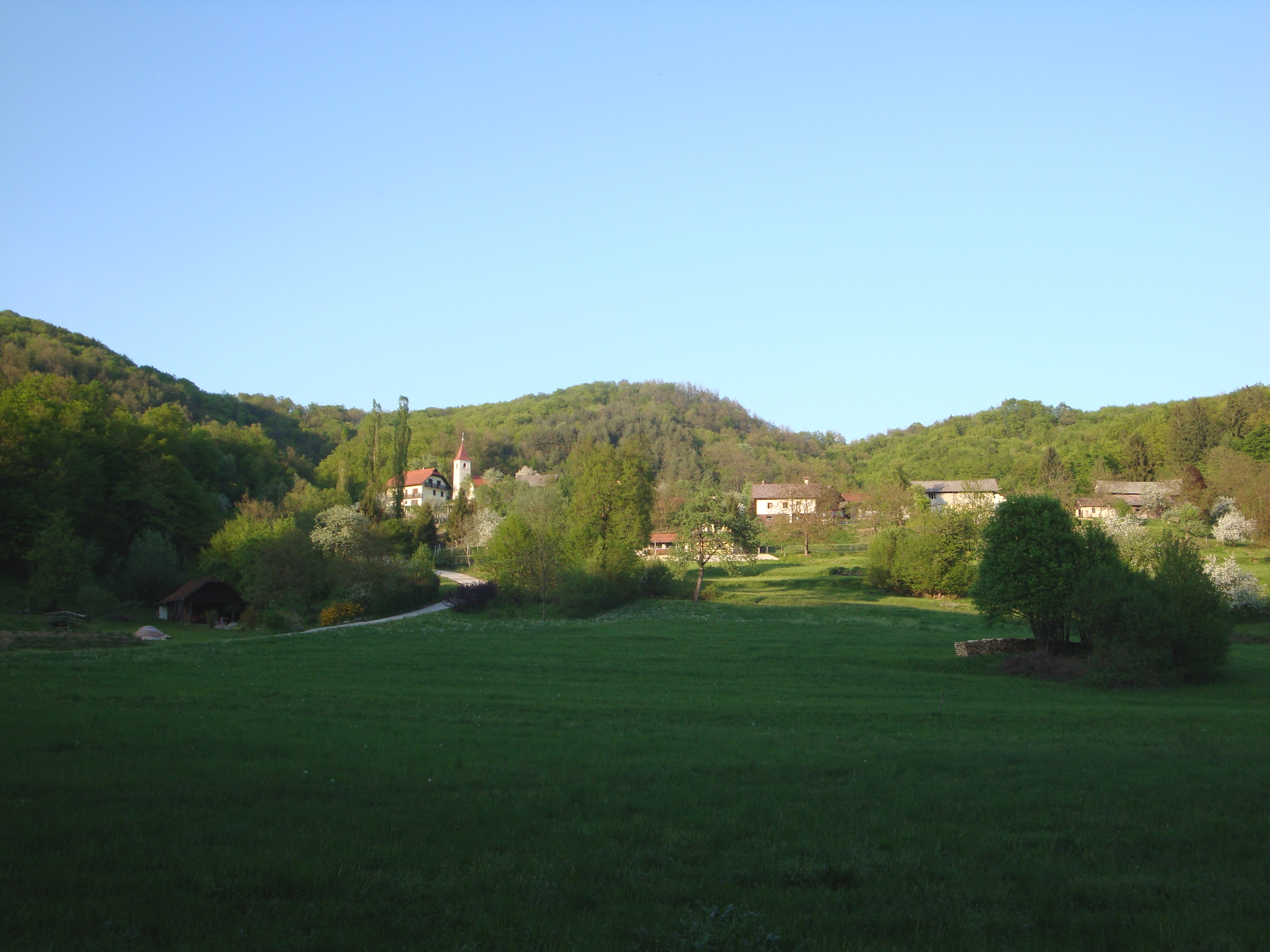

- Location in Slovenia
- Coordinates: 45°56′46.35″N 15°18′41.81″E
- Country: Slovenia
- Traditional region: Lower Carniola
- Statistical region: Southeast Slovenia
- Municipality: Škocjan

Area
  - Total: 4.88 km^{2} (1.88 sq mi)
- Elevation: 263.6 m (865 ft)

Population (2002)
  - Total: 56

Močvirje (pronounced [mɔˈtʃʋiːɾjɛ]) is a settlement in the Municipality of Škocjan in southeastern Slovenia. The area is part of the historical region of Lower Carniola. Within the municipality, it belongs to the Local Community of Bučka. The municipality is now included in the Southeast Slovenia Statistical Region.

The local church is dedicated to Saint George and belongs to the Parish of Bučka. It was first mentioned in written documents dating to 1581 and has 18th- and 19th-century additions.
