= Osrečje =

- Location in Slovenia
- Coordinates: 45°53′26.14″N 15°16′47.96″E
- Country: Slovenia
- Traditional region: Lower Carniola
- Statistical region: Southeast Slovenia
- Municipality: Škocjan

Area
  - Total: 1.86 km^{2} (0.72 sq mi)
- Elevation: 212.9 m (698 ft)

Population (2002)
  - Total: 72

Osrečje (pronounced [ɔˈsɾeːtʃjɛ]) is a settlement southwest of Škocjan in Lower Carniola in southeastern Slovenia. Within the Municipality of Škocjan, it belongs to the Local Community of Škocjan. The Municipality of Škocjan is included in the Southeast Slovenia Statistical Region.
