= Dobrava pri Škocjanu =

- Location in Slovenia
- Coordinates: 45°52′32.57″N 15°19′35.57″E
- Country: Slovenia
- Traditional region: Lower Carniola
- Statistical region: Southeast Slovenia
- Municipality: Škocjan

Area
  - Total: 2.05 km^{2} (0.79 sq mi)
- Elevation: 153.6 m (504 ft)

Population (2002)
  - Total: 191

Dobrava pri Škocjanu (pronounced [ˈdoːbɾaʋa pɾi ʃkɔˈtsjaːnu]; German: Dobrawa) is a settlement in the Municipality of Škocjan in southeastern Slovenia. It lies on the left bank of the Krka River on the regional road leading south from Škocjan to Šentjernej. Within the municipality, it belongs to the Village Community of Dobrava pri Škocjanu and Tomažja Vas. The area is part of the historical region of Lower Carniola. The municipality is now included in the Southeast Slovenia Statistical Region.

== Name ==
The name of the settlement was changed from Dobrava to Dobrava pri Škocjanu in 1953. In the past the German name was Dobrawa.
