= Zagrad, Škocjan =

Zagrad
- Location in Slovenia
- Coordinates: 45°55′45.63″N 15°15′21.87″E
- Country: Slovenia
- Traditional region: Lower Carniola
- Statistical region: Southeast Slovenia
- Municipality: Škocjan

Area
  - Total: 2.02 km^{2} (0.78 sq mi)
- Elevation: 267.9 m (879 ft)

Population (2002)
  - Total: 84

Zagrad (pronounced [ˈzaːɡɾat]; German: Sagrad) is a village in the Municipality of Škocjan in southeastern Slovenia. It lies northwest of Škocjan in the historical region of Lower Carniola. Within the municipality, it is the administrative centre of the Village Community of Zagrad. The municipality is now included in the Southeast Slovenia Statistical Region.
