= Klenovik =

- Location in Slovenia
- Coordinates: 45°55′54.42″N 15°15′1.48″E
- Country: Slovenia
- Traditional region: Lower Carniola
- Statistical region: Southeast Slovenia
- Municipality: Škocjan

Area
  - Total: 4 km^{2} (1.5 sq mi)
- Elevation: 277.8 m (911 ft)

Population (2002)
  - Total: 107

Klenovik (pronounced [klɛnɔˈʋiːk]) is a dispersed settlement in the Municipality of Škocjan in southeastern Slovenia. Within the municipality, it belongs to the Village Community of Zagrad. The municipality is included in the Southeast Slovenia Statistical Region and was part of the historical region of Lower Carniola.
