= Mačkovec pri Škocjanu =

- Location in Slovenia
- Coordinates: 45°55′56.64″N 15°17′36.54″E
- Country: Slovenia
- Traditional region: Lower Carniola
- Statistical region: Southeast Slovenia
- Municipality: Škocjan

Area
  - Total: 0.68 km^{2} (0.26 sq mi)
- Elevation: 227.1 m (745 ft)

Population (2002)
  - Total: 30

Mačkovec pri Škocjanu (pronounced [matʃˈkɔːʋəts pɾi ʃkɔtsˈjaːnu] or [matʃˈkoː-]; in older sources also Mačkovc) is a small settlement in the Municipality of Škocjan in southeastern Slovenia (the traditional region of Lower Carniola). Within the municipality, it belongs to the Village Community of Dole. It lies north of Škocjan, just off the road to Dolenje Dole. The municipality is now included in the Southeast Slovenia Statistical Region. The surname Hočevar is frequent in the village.

== Geography ==
Mačkovec pri Škocjanu is a clustered settlement on the west slope of Lapor Hill (391 m) and east of Little Creek (Slovene: Mali potok, also known as Dole Creek, Dolski potok). The soil is mostly sandy, with field areas named Zadnje njive (literally, 'last fields'), Kamenca ('stony'), and na Laporju ('on Lapor Hill'), and meadows in the Zadole ('beyond Dole') area. There is wooded land to the northeast.

== Name ==
Mačkovec pri Škocjanu was attested in written sources circa 1400 as Kaczendorff (and as Matschendorff before 1406). Morphological evidence indicates that the name is not derived directly from maček '(tom)cat', but instead from Maček used as a nickname for an individual (which itself is based on the name for the animal). The name is less likely to be derived from the noun mačkovec 'pussy willow'. The name of the settlement was changed from Mačkovec to Mačkovec pri Škocjanu in 1953.
