= Male Poljane =

- Location in Slovenia
- Coordinates: 45°55′14.01″N 15°14′24.63″E
- Country: Slovenia
- Traditional region: Lower Carniola
- Statistical region: Southeast Slovenia
- Municipality: Škocjan

Area
  - Total: 1.1 km^{2} (0.42 sq mi)
- Elevation: 235.7 m (773 ft)

Population (2002)
  - Total: 47

Male Poljane (pronounced [ˈmaːlɛ pɔˈljaːnɛ]; German: Kleinpölland) is a small settlement just west of Velike Poljane in the Municipality of Škocjan in southeastern Slovenia (the traditional region of Lower Carniola). Within the municipality, it belongs to the Village Community of Zagrad. The municipality is now included in the Southeast Slovenia Statistical Region.
