= Štrit =

- Location in Slovenia
- Coordinates: 45°54′58.22″N 15°20′17.27″E
- Country: Slovenia
- Traditional region: Lower Carniola
- Statistical region: Southeast Slovenia
- Municipality: Škocjan

Area
  - Total: 1.56 km^{2} (0.60 sq mi)
- Elevation: 195.1 m (640 ft)

Population (2002)
  - Total: 79

Štrit (pronounced [ˈʃtɾiːt]; in older sources also Strit) is a settlement in the Municipality of Škocjan in southeastern Slovenia. Within the municipality, it belongs to the Local Community of Bučka. The area is part of the historical region of Lower Carniola. The municipality is included in the Southeast Slovenia Statistical Region. It includes the hamlets of Marušič, Pečica, Trdika, and Colnišče.

== History ==
During the Second World War, the population of the village was evicted by the German occupation authorities in November 1941. Gottschee Germans were settled in their place and remained in the village until the end of the war.
