= Goriška Gora =

- Location in Slovenia
- Coordinates: 45°55′42.57″N 15°16′26.84″E
- Country: Slovenia
- Traditional region: Lower Carniola
- Statistical region: Southeast Slovenia
- Municipality: Škocjan

Area
  - Total: 0.63 km^{2} (0.24 sq mi)
- Elevation: 284.2 m (932 ft)

Population (2002)
  - Total: 11

Goriška Gora (pronounced [ɡɔˈɾiːʃka ˈɡɔːɾa]) is a small settlement in the Municipality of Škocjan in historical region of Lower Carniola in southeastern Slovenia. Within the municipality, it belongs to the Village Community of Zagrad. The municipality is now included in the Southeast Slovenia Statistical Region.
