= Ignatius Knoblecher =

Slovene Roman Catholic missionary in Eastern North Africa

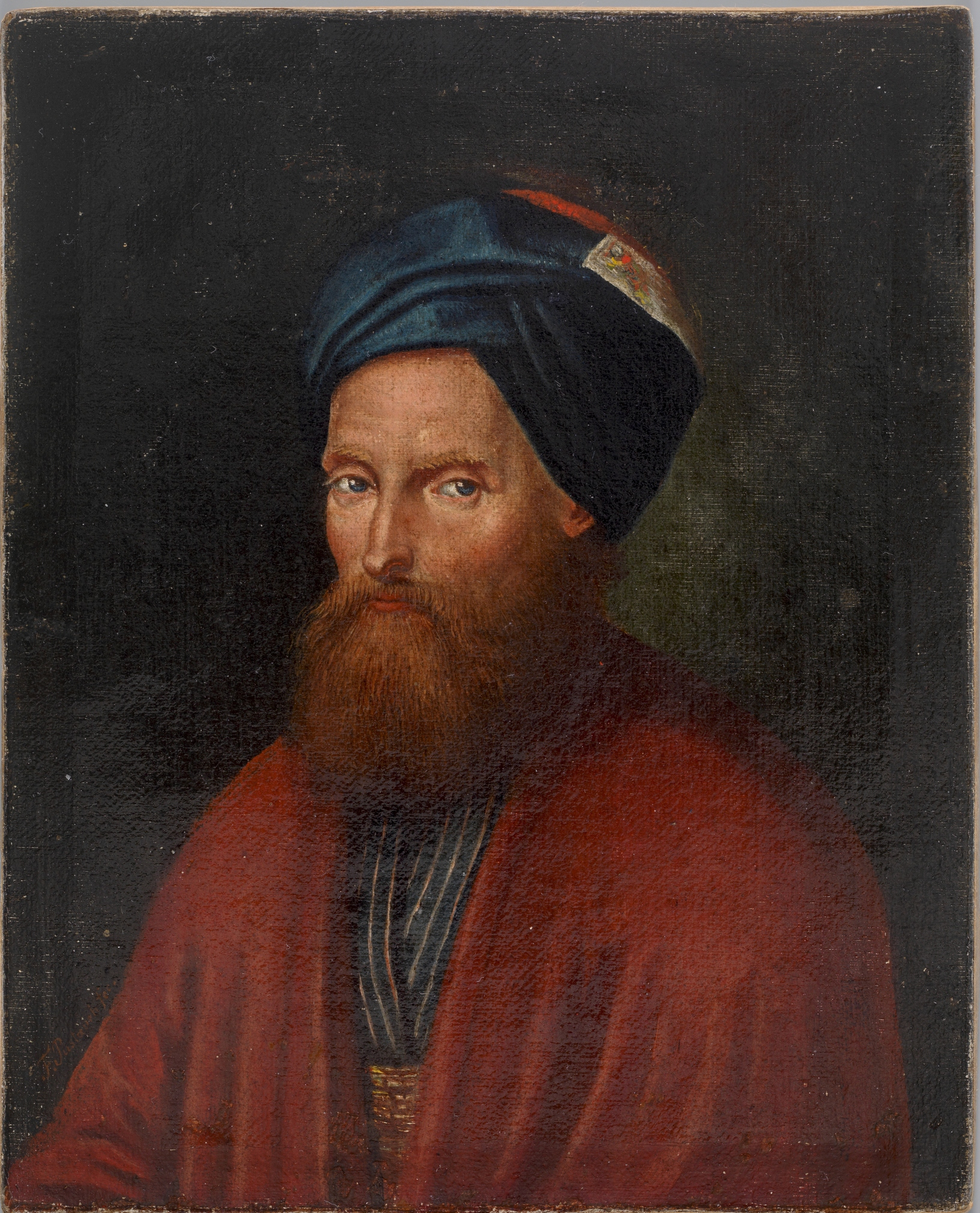
Ignatius Knoblecher (a portrait by Franc Pustavrh)

Ignatius Knoblecher (Slovenized: Ignacij Knoblehar or Knobleher; 6 July 1819 – 13 April 1858), also known by his Arabian nickname Abuna Soliman (meaning 'Our Father Solomon'), was a Slovene Roman Catholic missionary in Eastern North Africa. He was one of the first explorers of the White Nile basin.

== Life ==
Knoblecher was born in the small village of Škocjan in Lower Carniola. He studied at the secondary school in Rudolfswerth (now Novo Mesto), at the lyceum and the theological seminary in Laibach (now Ljubljana), and at the College of Propaganda in Rome. On 9 March 1845 he was ordained a priest, and a year later graduated as a doctor of theology.

When the Vicariate Apostolic of Sudan was established on 3 April 1846, the Congregation of Propaganda selected Knoblecher as one of the missionaries for the region. Before leaving for central Africa he spent eight months in Lebanon and at other places in Syria to acquaint himself with the rites and customs of the Oriental Christians. Towards the end of September, 1847, he left Cairo in company of Maximilian Ryllo, the Pro-Vicar Apostolic of Central Africa, and four other missionaries, and arrived at Khartoum on 11 February 1848. Here they established a school for young Africans whom they had purchased in the slave-market and who subsequently assisted them on their missions. Through them Knoblecher became acquainted with languages spoken in the interior of Africa, and was soon enabled to compile a sort of dictionary of these languages. In the mid-1850s, some of the children were transferred to Ljubljana, where they were accepted as objects of curiosity and with public contempt, baptised, and educated by local notables (e.g. Josip Stritar). They soon moved to other places or died due to harsh winters.

When Ryllo died on 17 June 1848, Knoblecher succeeded him as pro-vicar apostolic. From Khartoum, Knoblecher made an expedition into the interior of Africa in the fall of 1849. He ascended the White Nile (Bahr-el-Abiad) and was the first European to penetrate into the land of the Bari people, as far as 4° 10′ N. In 1850 he went back to Austria to recruit missionaries and collect money for the African missions. He returned to Africa in 1852 with five new missionaries, established a mission among the Bari tribe at Gondokoro, and in 1854 another among the Dinka or Jangeh people at Angweyn (Heiligenkreuz).

The missionaries were hampered by European merchants and slave-traders. Bad health cut short the lives of many of them, and Knoblecher himself died in Naples while making a journey to Europe to convalesce.

Accounts of his travels in Eastern North Africa were published in Jahresberichte des Marienvereins (Vienna, 1852–58). His extensive ethnographical and ornithological collections are preserved in museums in Vienna and Ljubljana, and the studies that he prepared on the Dinka and Bari languages are in the Austrian National Library.

Knoblecher was baptized Ignatius Knoblecher in 1819. The spelling of his surname as Knobleher appears in Slovene publications by 1846, and Knoblehar by 1849.
