= Mačkovac =

Mačkovac can refer to several places in Croatia, Bosnia and Herzegovina and Serbia:

Serbia

- Mačkovac (Kruševac), village in the Kruševac municipality
- Mačkovac, Kuršumlija, village in the Kuršumlija municipality

Bosnia and Herzegovina

- Mačkovac (Gradiška), village in the Gradiška municipality
- Mačkovac, Gornji Vakuf-Uskoplje, village in the Gornji Vakuf-Uskoplje municipality
- Mačkovac, Lopare, village in the Lopare municipality

Croatia

- Mačkovac, Brod-Posavina County, village in the Vrbje municipality
- Mačkovac, Virovitica-Podravina County, village in the Voćin municipality

== See also ==
- Mačkovec (disambiguation)
