= Ruhna Vas =

- Location in Slovenia
- Coordinates: 45°52′19.25″N 15°17′53.47″E
- Country: Slovenia
- Traditional region: Lower Carniola
- Statistical region: Southeast Slovenia
- Municipality: Škocjan

Area
  - Total: 0.5 km^{2} (0.19 sq mi)
- Elevation: 167.5 m (550 ft)

Population (2002)
  - Total: 9

Ruhna Vas (pronounced [ˈɾuːxna ˈʋaːs]; Slovene: Ruhna vas) is a small settlement on the left bank of the Krka River in the Municipality of Škocjan in southeastern Slovenia. Within the municipality, it belongs to the Village Community of Dobrava pri Škocjanu and Tomažja Vas. The area is part of the historical region of Lower Carniola. The municipality is now included in the Southeast Slovenia Statistical Region.

The Roman road from Emona to Neviodunum ran through the area and contemporary finds show evidence of a settlement near the road.
