= Dolnja Stara Vas =

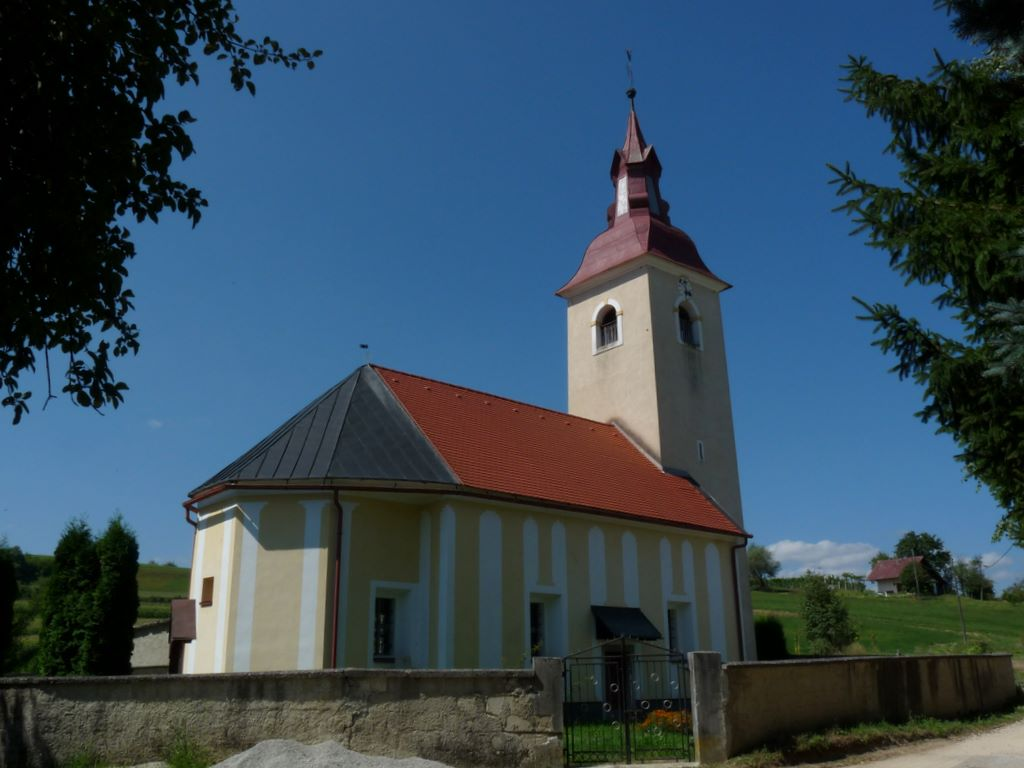

- Location in Slovenia
- Coordinates: 45°53′40.62″N 15°17′27.01″E
- Country: Slovenia
- Traditional region: Lower Carniola
- Statistical region: Southeast Slovenia
- Municipality: Škocjan

Area
  - Total: 1.9 km^{2} (0.73 sq mi)
- Elevation: 229.8 m (754 ft)

Population (2002)
  - Total: 127

Dolnja Stara Vas (pronounced [ˈdoːlnja ˈstaːɾa ˈʋaːs]; Slovene: Dolnja Stara vas, in older sources also Dolenja Stara Vas, German: Unteraltendorf) is a village in the Municipality of Škocjan in southeastern Slovenia. The area is part of the historical region of Lower Carniola. The municipality is now included in the Southeast Slovenia Statistical Region.

The local church is dedicated to the Holy Trinity and belongs to the Parish of Škocjan.
