= Stranje pri Škocjanu =

- Location in Slovenia
- Coordinates: 45°52′30.84″N 15°18′17.65″E
- Country: Slovenia
- Traditional region: Lower Carniola
- Statistical region: Southeast Slovenia
- Municipality: Škocjan

Area
  - Total: 0.51 km^{2} (0.20 sq mi)
- Elevation: 158.5 m (520 ft)

Population (2002)
  - Total: 56

Stranje pri Škocjanu (pronounced [ˈstɾaːnjɛ pɾi ʃkɔˈtsjaːnu]; German: Streine) is a small settlement on the left bank of the Krka River in the Municipality of Škocjan in southeastern Slovenia. Within the municipality, it belongs to the Village Community of Dobrava pri Škocjanu and Tomažja Vas. The area is part of the historical region of Lower Carniola. The municipality is now included in the Southeast Slovenia Statistical Region.

== Name ==
The name of the settlement was changed from Stranje to Stranje pri Škocjanu in 1953. In the past the German name was Streine.

== Cultural heritage ==
There is archaeological evidence of prehistoric and Roman settlement in the area.
