= Gorenje Radulje =

- Location in Slovenia
- Coordinates: 45°56′16.09″N 15°19′31.78″E
- Country: Slovenia
- Traditional region: Lower Carniola
- Statistical region: Southeast Slovenia
- Municipality: Škocjan

Area
  - Total: 1.3 km^{2} (0.50 sq mi)
- Elevation: 223.1 m (732 ft)

Population (2002)
  - Total: 59

Gorenje Radulje (pronounced [ɡɔˈɾeːnjɛ ˈɾaːduljɛ]; in older sources also Gorenje Radovlje, German: Oberradelstein) is a small settlement in the Municipality of Škocjan in southeastern Slovenia. Within the municipality, it belongs to the Local Community of Bučka. The municipality is included in the Southeast Slovenia Statistical Region and is part of the historical region of Lower Carniola.
