= Dule, Škocjan =

Dule
- Location in Slovenia
- Coordinates: 45°55′22.86″N 15°20′8.6″E
- Country: Slovenia
- Traditional region: Lower Carniola
- Statistical region: Southeast Slovenia
- Municipality: Škocjan

Area
  - Total: 3.06 km^{2} (1.18 sq mi)
- Elevation: 181.6 m (596 ft)

Population (2002)
  - Total: 42

Dule (pronounced [ˈduːlɛ]) is a settlement in the Municipality of Škocjan in southeastern Slovenia. Within the municipality, it belongs to the Local Community of Bučka. The municipality lies in the historical region of Lower Carniola and is now included in the Southeast Slovenia Statistical Region.
