= Gabrnik, Škocjan =

Gabrnik
- Location in Slovenia
- Coordinates: 45°55′59.48″N 15°15′56.75″E
- Country: Slovenia
- Traditional region: Lower Carniola
- Statistical region: Southeast Slovenia
- Municipality: Škocjan

Area
  - Total: 0.57 km^{2} (0.22 sq mi)
- Elevation: 311.3 m (1,021 ft)

Population (2002)
  - Total: 18

Gabrnik (pronounced [ˈɡaːbəɾnik]) is a small settlement in the Municipality of Škocjan in the historical region of Lower Carniola in southeastern Slovenia. Within the municipality, it belongs to the Village Community of Zagrad. The municipality is now included in the Southeast Slovenia Statistical Region.
