= Grmovlje =

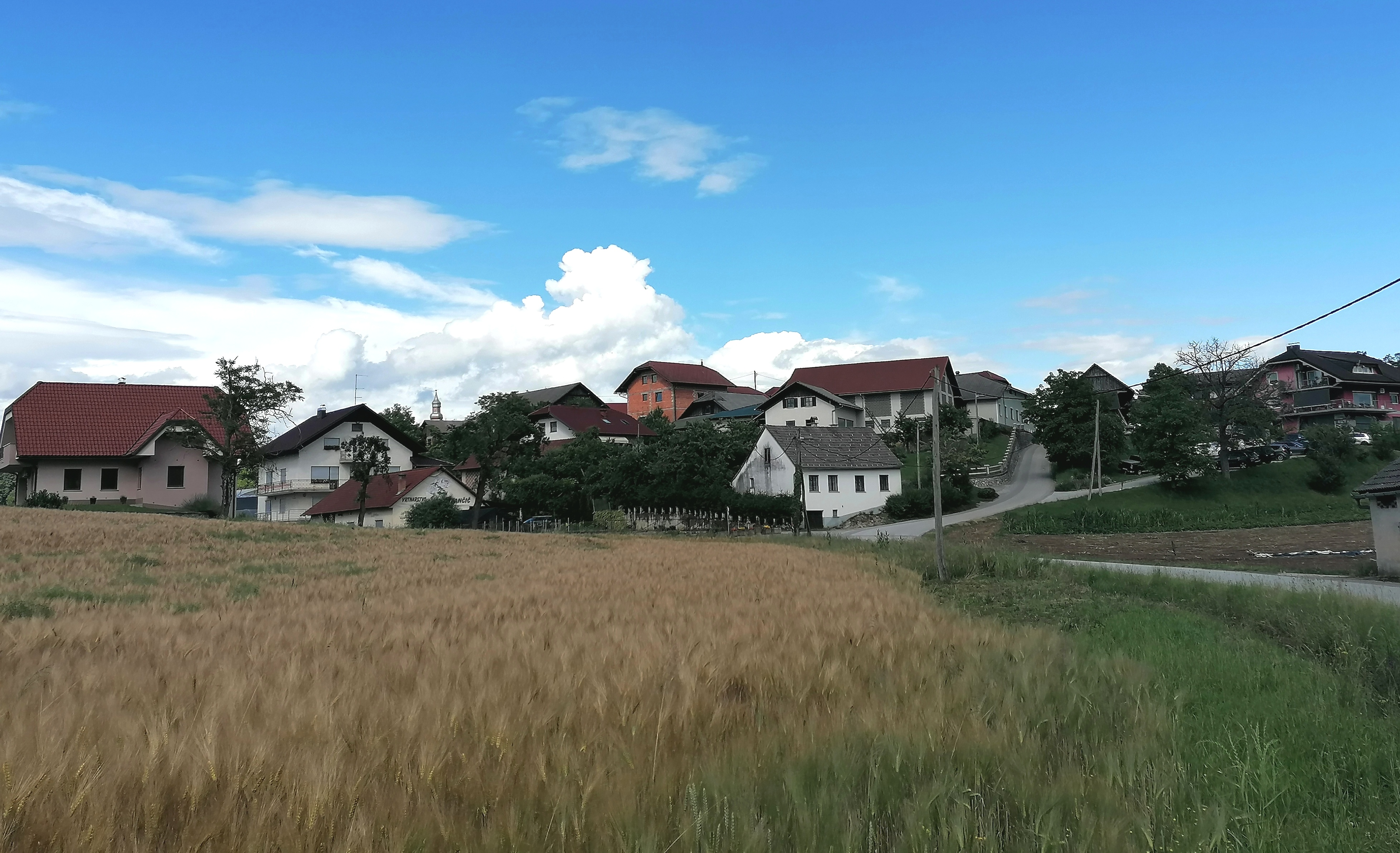

- Location in Slovenia
- Coordinates: 45°53′49.18″N 15°18′37.1″E
- Country: Slovenia
- Traditional region: Lower Carniola
- Statistical region: Southeast Slovenia
- Municipality: Škocjan

Area
  - Total: 2.29 km^{2} (0.88 sq mi)
- Elevation: 176.7 m (580 ft)

Population (2002)
  - Total: 143

Grmovlje (pronounced [ɡəɾˈmoːu̯ljɛ]) is a village in the Municipality of Škocjan in southeastern Slovenia. The area is part of the historical region of Lower Carniola. The municipality is now included in the Southeast Slovenia Statistical Region. Within the municipality, the village is the administrative centre of the Village Community of Grmovlje.

The local church is dedicated to Saint George and belongs to the Parish of Škocjan. It was built in 1761.
