= Stopno, Škocjan =

Stopno
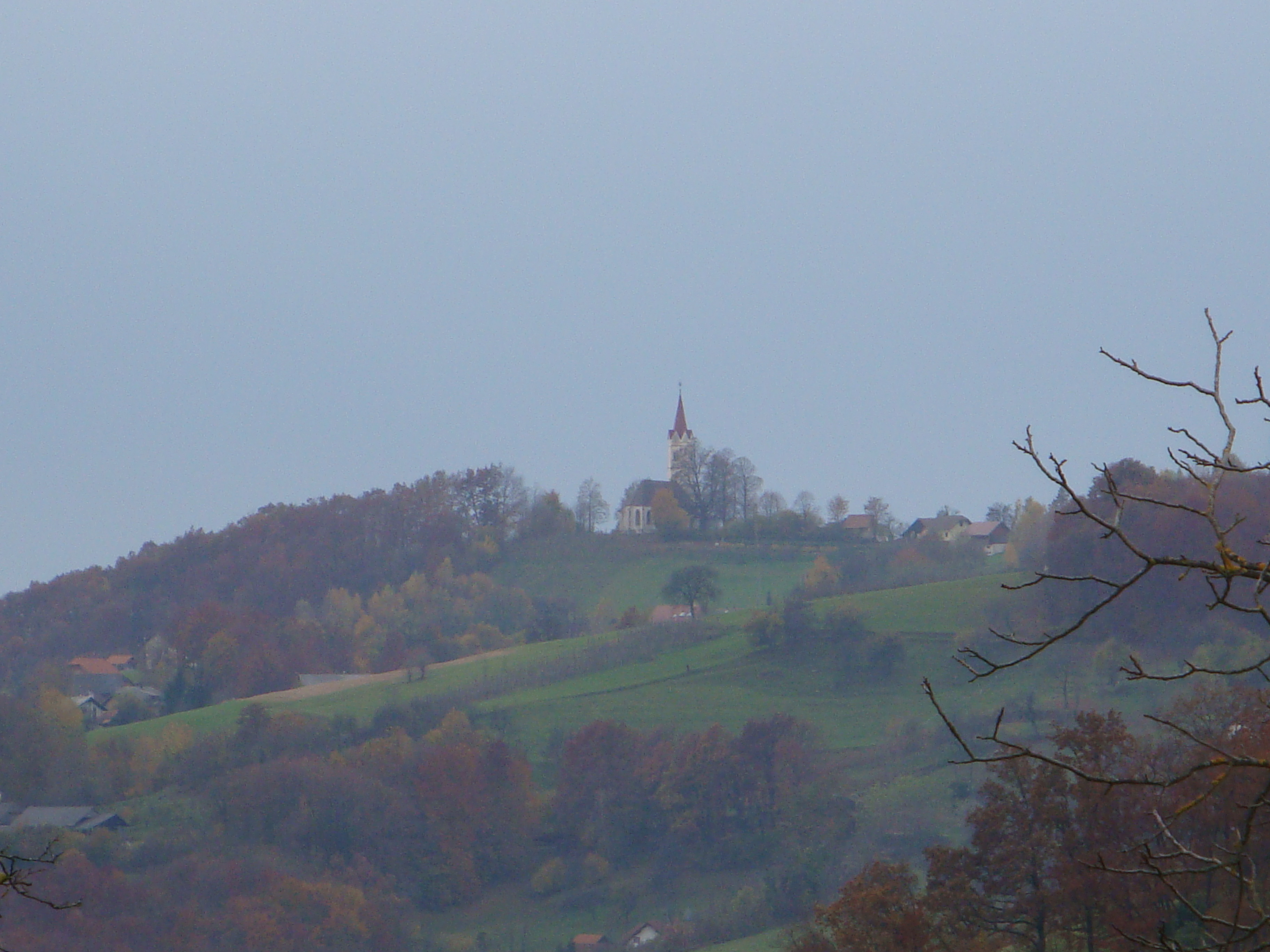

- Location in Slovenia
- Coordinates: 45°55′38.73″N 15°18′13.58″E
- Country: Slovenia
- Traditional region: Lower Carniola
- Statistical region: Southeast Slovenia
- Municipality: Škocjan

Area
  - Total: 0.76 km^{2} (0.29 sq mi)
- Elevation: 312.1 m (1,024 ft)

Population (2002)
  - Total: 32

Stopno (pronounced [ˈstoːpnɔ]) is a small settlement in the Municipality of Škocjan in southeastern Slovenia. The area is part of the historical region of Lower Carniola. Within the municipality, it belongs to the Local Community of Škocjan. The municipality is now included in the Southeast Slovenia Statistical Region. The settlement includes the hamlets of Sleme to the northeast and Podstopno to the west.

== Church ==
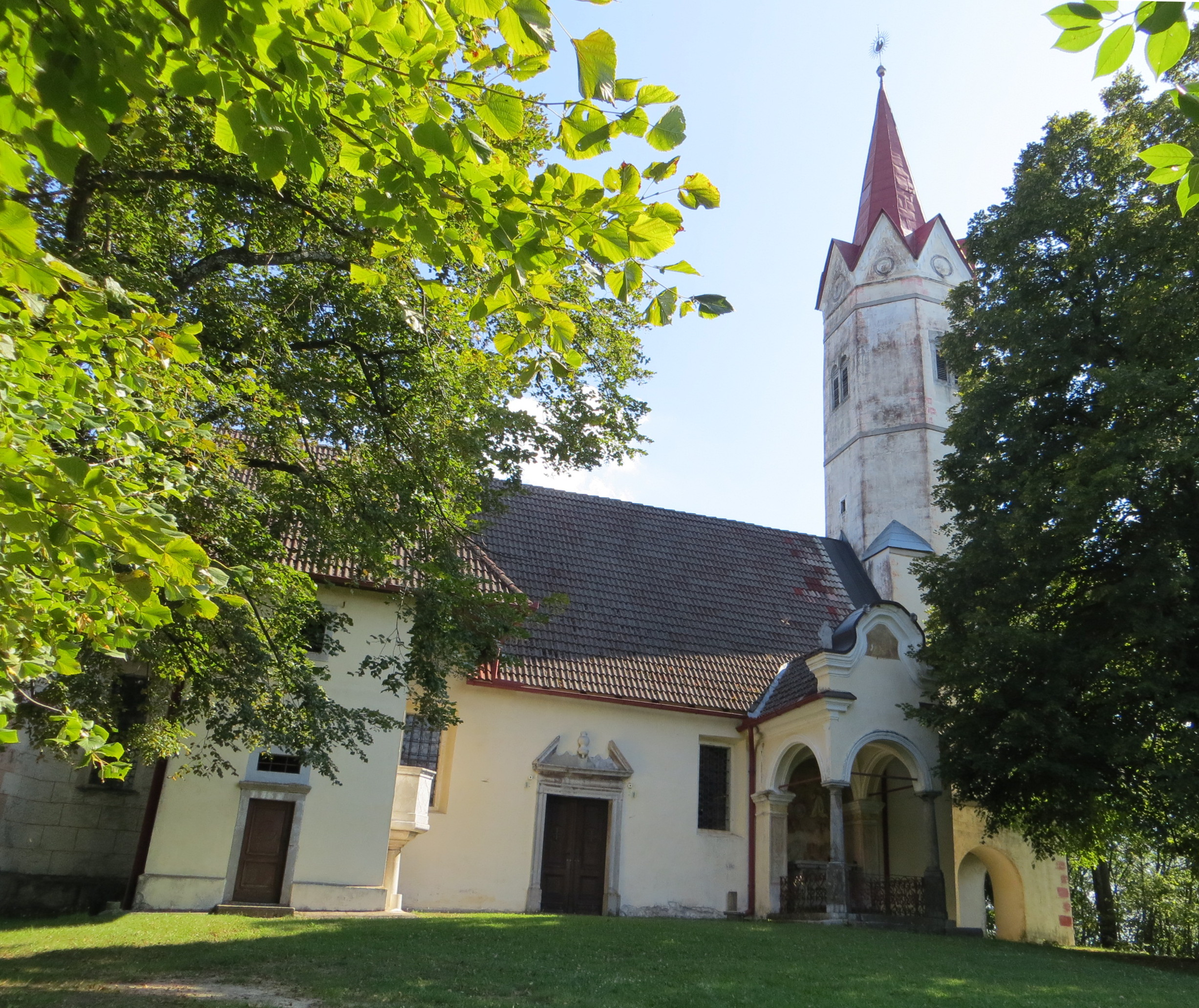
Our Lady of the Rosary Church

The local church, built on the top of a hill, is dedicated to Our Lady of the Rosary and belongs to the Parish of Škocjan pri Novem Mestu. It is a medieval pilgrimage church dating to the mid-15th century.
