= Tomažja Vas =

- Location in Slovenia
- Coordinates: 45°52′45.5″N 15°17′49.44″E
- Country: Slovenia
- Traditional region: Lower Carniola
- Statistical region: Southeast Slovenia
- Municipality: Škocjan

Area
  - Total: 0.99 km^{2} (0.38 sq mi)
- Elevation: 171.8 m (564 ft)

Population (2002)
  - Total: 107

Tomažja Vas (pronounced [tɔˈmaːʒja ˈʋaːs]; Slovene: Tomažja vas) is a small village in the Municipality of Škocjan in southeastern Slovenia. Within the municipality, it is the administrative centre of the Village Community of Dobrava pri Škocjanu and Tomažja Vas. The area is part of the historical region of Lower Carniola. The municipality is now included in the Southeast Slovenia Statistical Region.

The local church is dedicated to Saint Stephen and belongs to the Parish of Bela Cerkev. It was first mentioned in written documents dating to 1526 and was restyled in the Baroque in the 18th century.
