= Municipality of Škocjan =

Municipality of Slovenia

Municipality of Škocjan Občina Škocjan
- Municipality
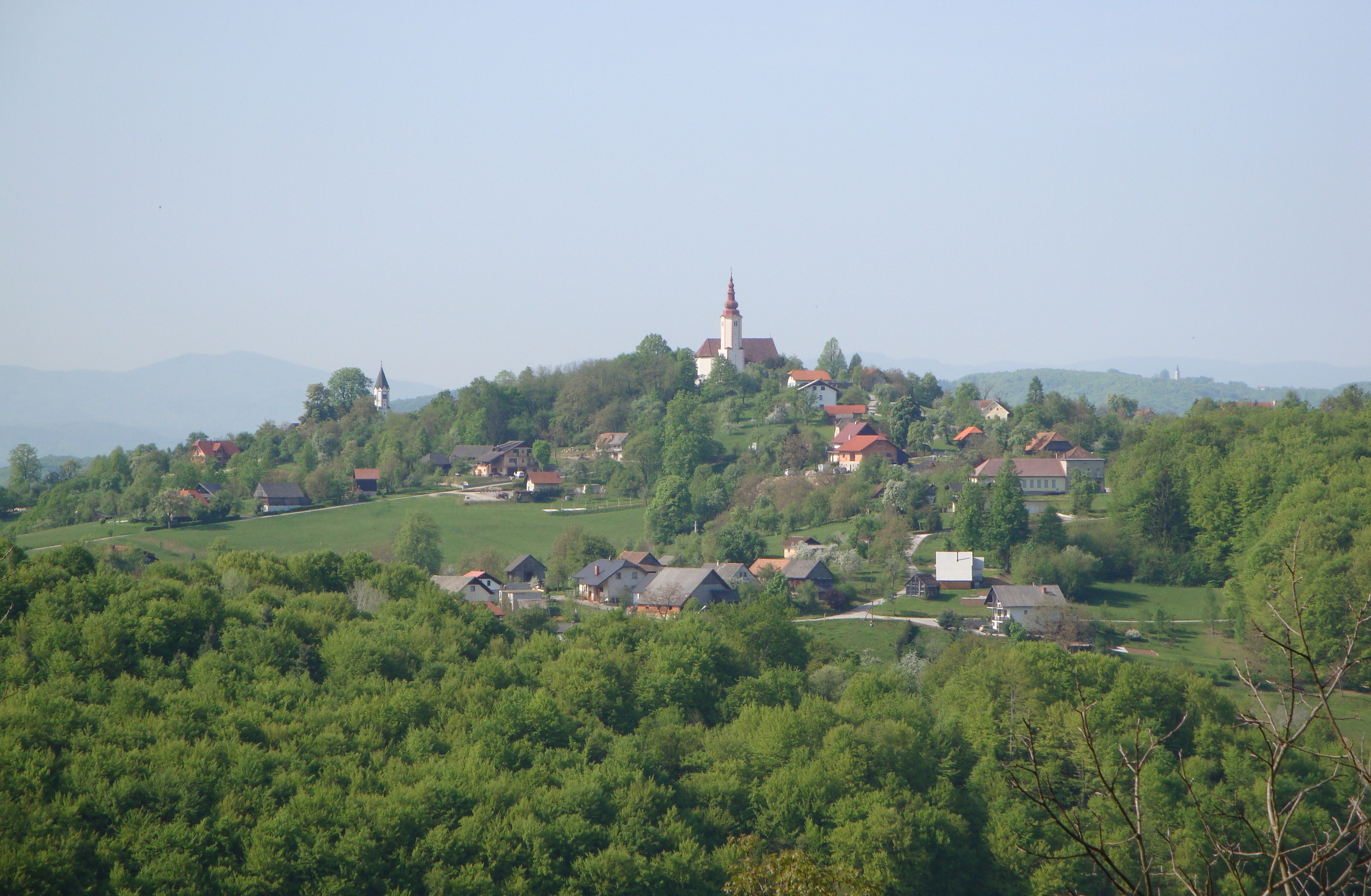

- Location of the Municipality of Škocjan in Slovenia
- Coordinates: 45°54′N 15°17′E
- Country: Slovenia

Government
  - Mayor: Jože Kapler

Area
  - Total: 60.4 km^{2} (23.3 sq mi)

Population (2002)
  - Total: 3,035
  - Density: 50.2/km^{2} (130/sq mi)
- Time zone: UTC+01 (CET)
  - Summer (DST): UTC+02 (CEST)
- Website: www.obcina-skocjan.si

The Municipality of Škocjan (pronounced [ˈʃkɔːtsjan]; Slovene: Občina Škocjan), established in October 1994, is a municipality in the traditional region of Lower Carniola in southeastern Slovenia. The seat of the municipality is Škocjan. The Municipality of Škocjan is now included in the Southeast Slovenia Statistical Region. The majority of the municipality is part of the Novo Mesto Administrative Unit, except for the northeastern part (Local Community of Bučka), which belongs to the Sevnica Administrative Unit.

== Subdivision ==
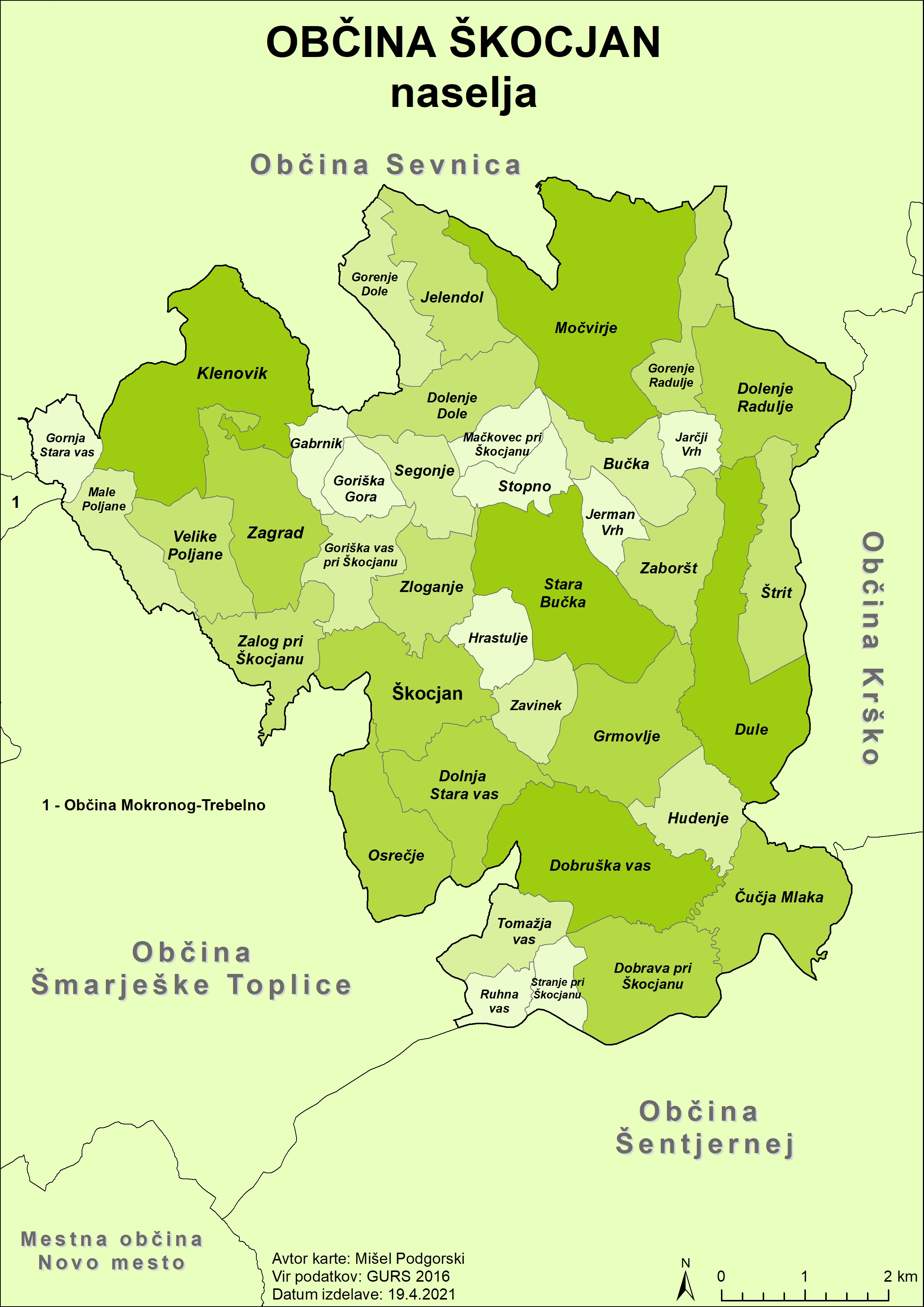
Villages in the municipality

The Municipality of Škocjan comprises the following local and village communities:

Local communities

- Bučka, comprising the settlements: Bučka, Dolenje Radulje, Dule, Gorenje Radulje, Jarčji Vrh, Jerman Vrh, Močvirje, Štrit and Zaboršt
- Škocjan, comprising the settlements: Hrastulje, Osrečje, Segonje, Stara Bučka, Stopno, Škocjan, Zalog pri Škocjanu, Zavinek and Zloganje

Village communities

- Dobrava pri Škocjanu and Tomažja Vas (Dobrava pri Škocjanu in Tomažja vas), comprising the settlements: Čučja Mlaka, Dobrava pri Škocjanu, Ruhna Vas, Stranje pri Škocjanu and Tomažja Vas
- Dole, comprising the settlements: Dolenje Dole, Gorenje Dole, Jelendol and Mačkovec pri Škocjanu
- Grmovlje, comprising the settlements: Dobruška Vas, Dolenja Stara Vas, Grmovlje and Hudenje
- Zagrad, comprising the settlements: Gabrnik, Goriška Gora, Goriška Vas pri Škocjanu, Gornja Stara Vas, Klenovik, Male Poljane, Velike Poljane and Zagrad
