= Dolenje Dole =

- Location in Slovenia
- Coordinates: 45°56′10.3″N 15°17′15.72″E
- Country: Slovenia
- Traditional region: Lower Carniola
- Statistical region: Southeast Slovenia
- Municipality: Škocjan

Area
  - Total: 1.52 km^{2} (0.59 sq mi)
- Elevation: 206.8 m (678 ft)

Population (2002)
  - Total: 98

Dolenje Dole (pronounced [dɔˈleːnjɛ ˈdoːlɛ]; German: Unterdule) is a small settlement in the Municipality of Škocjan in southeastern Slovenia. Within the municipality, it belongs to the Village Community of Dole. The area is part of the historical region of Lower Carniola and is now included in the Southeast Slovenia Statistical Region.
