= Poljane nad Blagovico =

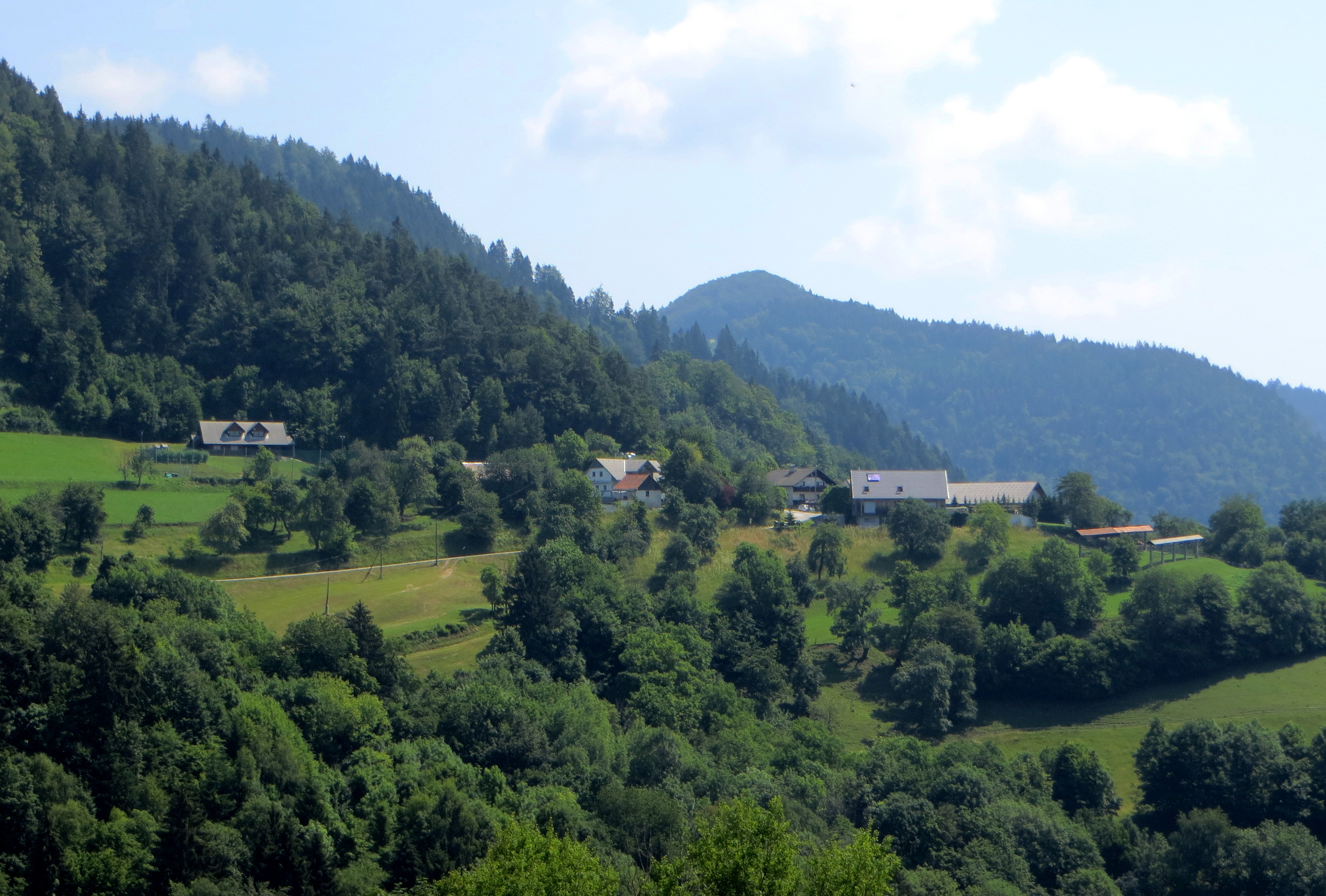

- Location in Slovenia
- Coordinates: 46°11′36.67″N 14°47′15.08″E
- Country: Slovenia
- Traditional region: Upper Carniola
- Statistical region: Central Slovenia
- Municipality: Lukovica

Area
  - Total: 0.61 km^{2} (0.24 sq mi)
- Elevation: 698.1 m (2,290 ft)

Population (2002)
  - Total: 9

Poljane nad Blagovico (pronounced [pɔˈljaːnɛ nad blaˈɡoːʋitsɔ]) is a small settlement in the hills north of Blagovica in the Municipality of Lukovica in the eastern part of the Upper Carniola region of Slovenia.

== Name ==
The name of the settlement was changed from Poljane to Poljane nad Blagovico in 1955.
