= Poljana, Tuzla =

Poljana
- Village
- Location within Bosnia and Herzegovina
- Coordinates: 44.4961669°N 18.5577523°E
- Country: Bosnia and Herzegovina
- Entity: Federation of Bosnia and Herzegovina
- Canton: Tuzla
- Municipality: Tuzla

Area
  - Total: 1.30 sq mi (3.36 km^{2})

Population (2013)
  - Total: 585
  - Density: 451/sq mi (174/km^{2})
- Time zone: UTC+1 (CET)
  - Summer (DST): UTC+2 (CEST)

Poljana is a village in the municipality of Tuzla, Tuzla Canton, Bosnia and Herzegovina. It is located at the northeastern tip of Modrac Lake.

== Demographics ==
According to the 2013 census, its population was 585.

Ethnicity in 2013
Ethnicity	Number	Percentage
Croats	372	63.6%
Bosniaks	176	30.1%
Serbs	7	1.2%
other/undeclared	30	5.1%
Total	585	100%
