= Goriška Vas pri Škocjanu =

- Location in Slovenia
- Coordinates: 45°55′18.27″N 15°16′26.25″E
- Country: Slovenia
- Traditional region: Lower Carniola
- Statistical region: Southeast Slovenia
- Municipality: Škocjan

Area
  - Total: 1.13 km^{2} (0.44 sq mi)
- Elevation: 284.2 m (932 ft)

Population (2002)
  - Total: 11

Goriška Vas pri Škocjanu (pronounced [ɡɔˈɾiːʃka ˈʋaːs pɾi ʃkɔˈtsjaːnu]; Slovene: Goriška vas pri Škocjanu) is a small village in the Municipality of Škocjan in southeastern Slovenia. Within the municipality, it belongs to the Village Community of Zagrad. The area is part of the historical region of Lower Carniola. The municipality is now included in the Southeast Slovenia Statistical Region.

== Name ==
The name of the settlement was changed from Goriška vas to Goriška vas pri Škocjanu in 1953.

== Church ==
The local church is dedicated to Saints Hermagoras and Fortunatus and belongs to the Parish of Škocjan. It is a medieval building that was restyled in the Baroque in the first half of the 18th century.
