= Stara Vas, Croatia =

Village in Zadar County, Croatia

Stara Vas Villavecchia di Pago
- Village
- Location within Croatia
- Coordinates: 44.37591°N 15.15734°E
- Country: Croatia
- County: Zadar County
- Town: Pag

Area
  - Total: 9.6 km^{2} (3.7 sq mi)

Population (2021)
  - Total: 65
  - Density: 6.8/km^{2} (18/sq mi)
- Time zone: UTC+1 (CET)
  - Summer (DST): UTC+2 (CEST)
- Postal code: 23249
- Area code: 023
- Vehicle registration: ZD

Stara Vas (Italian: Villavecchia di Pago) is a village on the Croatian island of Pag, in Zadar County. Administratively, it is part of the town of Pag. As of 2021, it had a population of 65.
