= Dobruška Vas =

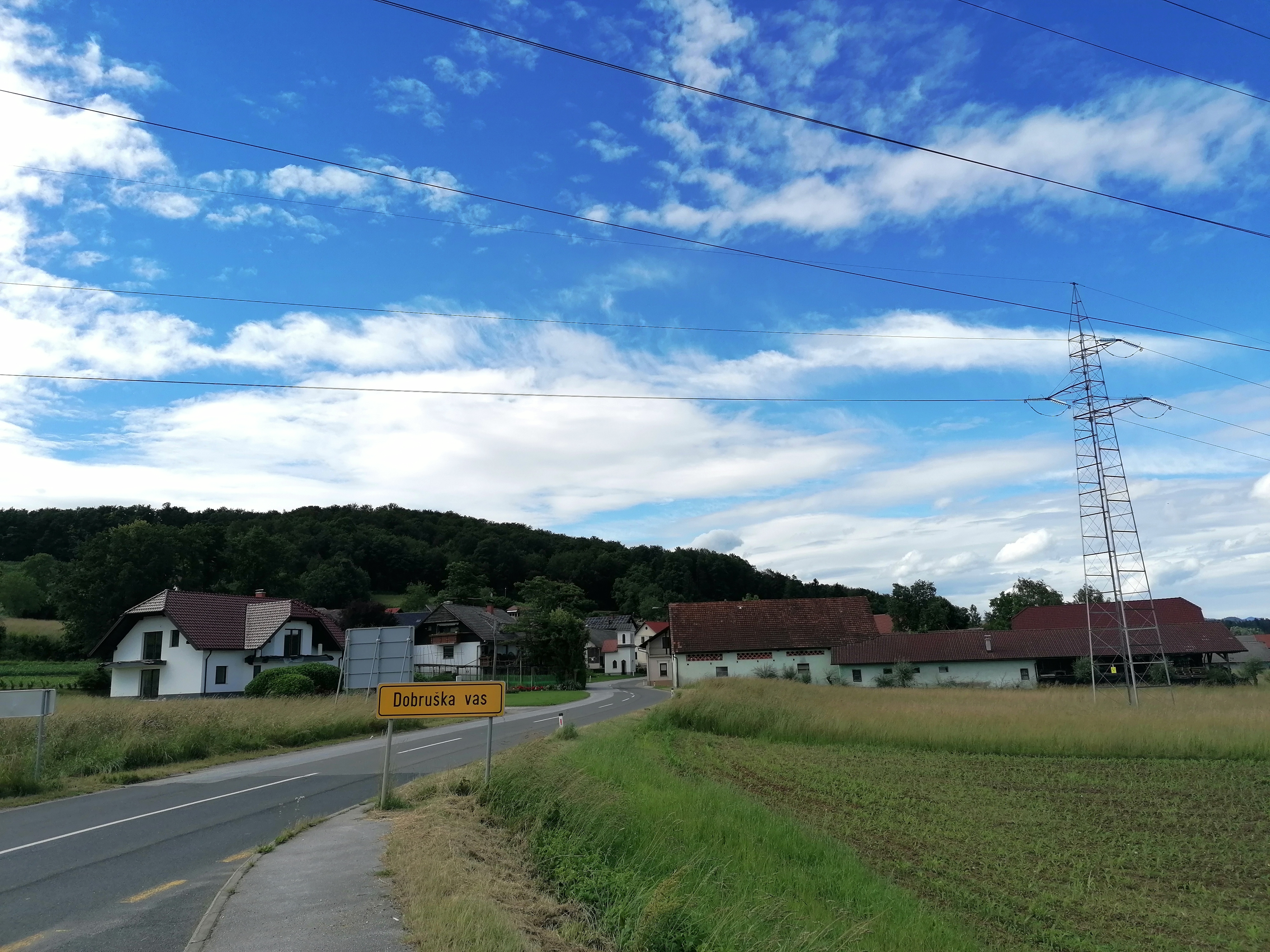

- Location in Slovenia
- Coordinates: 45°53′17.48″N 15°18′21.62″E
- Country: Slovenia
- Traditional region: Lower Carniola
- Statistical region: Southeast Slovenia
- Municipality: Škocjan

Area
  - Total: 3.07 km^{2} (1.19 sq mi)
- Elevation: 166.2 m (545 ft)

Population (2002)
  - Total: 258

Dobruška Vas (pronounced [dɔˈbɾuːʃka ˈʋaːs]; Slovene: Dobruška vas) is a village in the Municipality of Škocjan in southeastern Slovenia. Within the municipality, it belongs to the Village Community of Grmovlje. It lies on the regional road leading south from Škocjan to Šentjernej. The A2 motorway runs just east of the settlement. The area is part of the historical region of Lower Carniola. The municipality is now included in the Southeast Slovenia Statistical Region. The settlement includes the hamlets of Cesta and Zatreb.

== Name ==
The name Dobruška vas is derived from a possessive form of the hypocorism *Dobruš(a) or *Dobrux(a). Like similar place names (e.g., Dobruša, and also Dobruševo in Macedonia), it thus refers to an early inhabitant of the place.

== History ==
Early settlement of Dobruška Vas is attested by Roman artifacts that have been found in the area. During the Second World War, part of the village was burned by German forces on May 14, 1944.

=== Mass grave ===
Dobruška Vas is the site of a mass grave from the period immediately after the Second World War. The Dobruška Vas Mass Grave (Slovene: Grobišče Dobruška vas) is located about 300 meters (980 ft) east of the settlement alongside a field, 10 m from the left bank of Mlaka Creek and 130 meters (430 ft) above the bridge over the creek. It contains the remains of up to 62 Croatian refugees murdered at the site on the evening of May 17, 1945. The local people buried their bodies in two trenches at the site.

=== Murder of two Romani women ===
On June 3, 2005 two Roma women in Dobruška Vas were murdered in a racist attack, when a hand grenade was thrown into their bedroom. Three right-wing extremists were arrested and convicted of the crime. They appealed, however, and the trial is still ongoing.
