= Gorenje Dole, Škocjan =

Gorenje Dole
- Location in Slovenia
- Coordinates: 45°56′36.26″N 15°16′56.82″E
- Country: Slovenia
- Traditional region: Lower Carniola
- Statistical region: Southeast Slovenia
- Municipality: Škocjan

Area
  - Total: 1.16 km^{2} (0.45 sq mi)
- Elevation: 256.1 m (840 ft)

Population (2002)
  - Total: 40

Gorenje Dole (pronounced [ɡɔˈɾeːnjɛ ˈdoːlɛ]; German: Oberdule) is a settlement in the Municipality of Škocjan in southeastern Slovenia. Within the municipality, it belongs to the Village Community of Dole. The area is part of the historical region of Lower Carniola. The municipality is now included in the Southeast Slovenia Statistical Region.

The local church in the village is dedicated to the Holy Cross and belongs to the Parish of Škocjan. It was first mentioned in written documents dating to 1526. It was restyled in the Baroque in the 18th century.
