= Gornja Stara Vas =

- Location in Slovenia
- Coordinates: 45°56′0.4″N 15°13′50.95″E
- Country: Slovenia
- Traditional region: Lower Carniola
- Statistical region: Southeast Slovenia
- Municipality: Škocjan

Area
  - Total: 0.72 km^{2} (0.28 sq mi)
- Elevation: 285.2 m (936 ft)

Population (2002)
  - Total: 24

Gornja Stara Vas (pronounced [ˈɡoːɾnja ˈstaːɾa ˈʋaːs]; Slovene: Gornja Stara vas, in older sources also Gorenja Stara Vas, German: Oberaltendorf) is a small settlement in the Municipality of Škocjan in southeastern Slovenia (the traditional region of Lower Carniola). Within the municipality, it belongs to the Village Community of Zagrad. The municipality is now included in the Southeast Slovenia Statistical Region.
