= Velike Poljane, Škocjan =

Velike Poljane
- Location in Slovenia
- Coordinates: 45°55′21.73″N 15°14′50.66″E
- Country: Slovenia
- Traditional region: Lower Carniola
- Statistical region: Southeast Slovenia
- Municipality: Škocjan

Area
  - Total: 1.32 km^{2} (0.51 sq mi)
- Elevation: 228.9 m (751 ft)

Population (2002)
  - Total: 79

Velike Poljane (pronounced [ˈʋeːlikɛ pɔˈljaːnɛ]; German: Großpölland) is a village in the Municipality of Škocjan in southeastern Slovenia (the traditional region of Lower Carniola). Within the municipality, it belongs to the Village Community of Zagrad. The municipality is now included in the Southeast Slovenia Statistical Region.

The local church is dedicated to Saint Thomas and belongs to the Parish of Škocjan. It is a medieval building that was restyled in the Baroque style in 1731.
