= Polijane, Istog =

Polanë Poljane
- Village
- Location in Kosovo
- Location: Kosovo
- District: Peja
- Municipality: Istog

Population (2024)
  - Total: 20
- Time zone: UTC+1 (CET)
  - Summer (DST): UTC+2 (CEST)

Poljane or Polanë (Albanian: Polanë, Polana; Serbian: пољае) is a village/settlement in the Istog municipality, Kosovo.

36 Serb families lived in the village of Poljane before the 1999 war. In the war, the Serbs got displaced and in the subsequent decade their land got usurped. The forests there have also been burned.

On June 3, 2010, eight Serbs returned after 11 years.

== Population ==
Ethnic Composition
Year	Serbs	%	Albanians	%	others	%	Total
1961	327	95.34%	16	4.66%	0	0.00%	343
1971	331	93.24%	21	5.92%	3	0.86%	355
1981	276	93.56%	19	6.44%	0	0.00%	295
1991	132	99.25%	0	0.00%	1	0.75%	133
