= Škocjan, Škocjan =

Škocjan
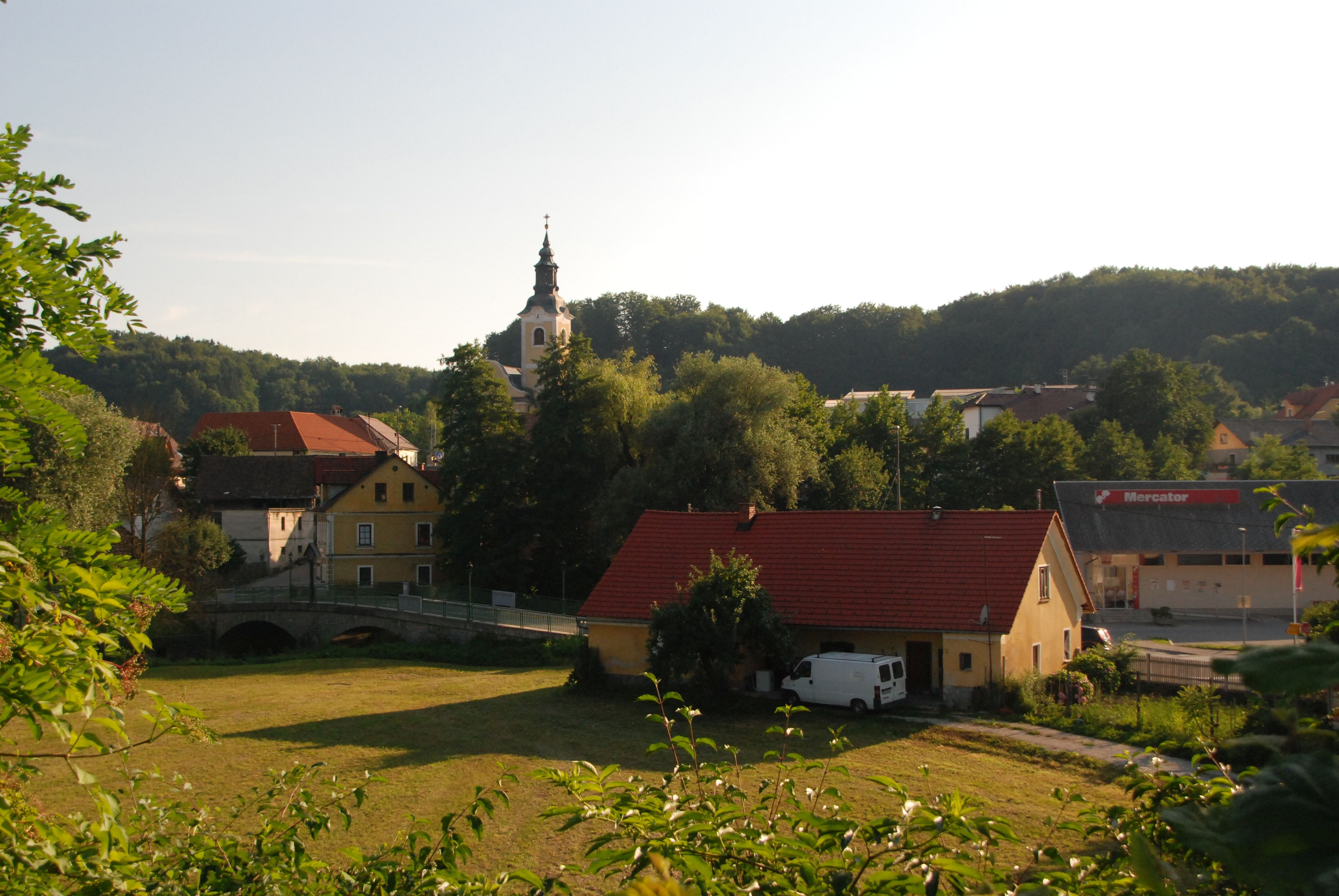

- Location in Slovenia
- Coordinates: 45°54′24.67″N 15°17′29.09″E
- Country: Slovenia
- Traditional region: Lower Carniola
- Statistical region: Southeast Slovenia
- Municipality: Škocjan

Area
  - Total: 2.0 km^{2} (0.77 sq mi)
- Elevation: 170.4 m (559 ft)

Population (2002)
  - Total: 233
- Postal code: 8275 Škocjan

Škocjan (pronounced [ˈʃkɔːtsjan], German: Sankt Cantian) is a settlement in the traditional region of Lower Carniola in southeastern Slovenia, best known as the birthplace of the Slovene missionary Ignatius Knoblecher (1819–1858). It is the seat of the Municipality of Škocjan and the Local Community of Škocjan within the municipality. The Municipality of Škocjan is now included in the Southeast Slovenia Statistical Region.

== Vrh Estate ==
The Vrh Estate (in older sources also Kolešnik, German: Auenthal) stands 1 km west of Škocjan. By the 20th century it was reduced to a large farm owned by the Rupar family of Goriška Vas pri Škocjanu. The manor was built before 1667 by Wolfgang Blande. It passed through many owners over the following centuries and was purchased by the Rupar family in 1928.

== Church ==
The local parish church from which the settlement gets its name is dedicated to Saint Cantius and Companions and belongs to the Roman Catholic Diocese of Novo Mesto. It is a medieval building that was extended in the 17th century and restyled in the Baroque style in the 18th century.

== Notable people ==
Notable people that were born or lived in Škocjan include:

- Ignatius Knoblecher (1819–1858), missionary and explorer of northeastern Africa
- Franc Serafin Metelko (1789–1860), linguist, translator, writer and priest
- Janez Zalokar (1792–1872), lexicographer, writer on economics, priest
