= Bučka =

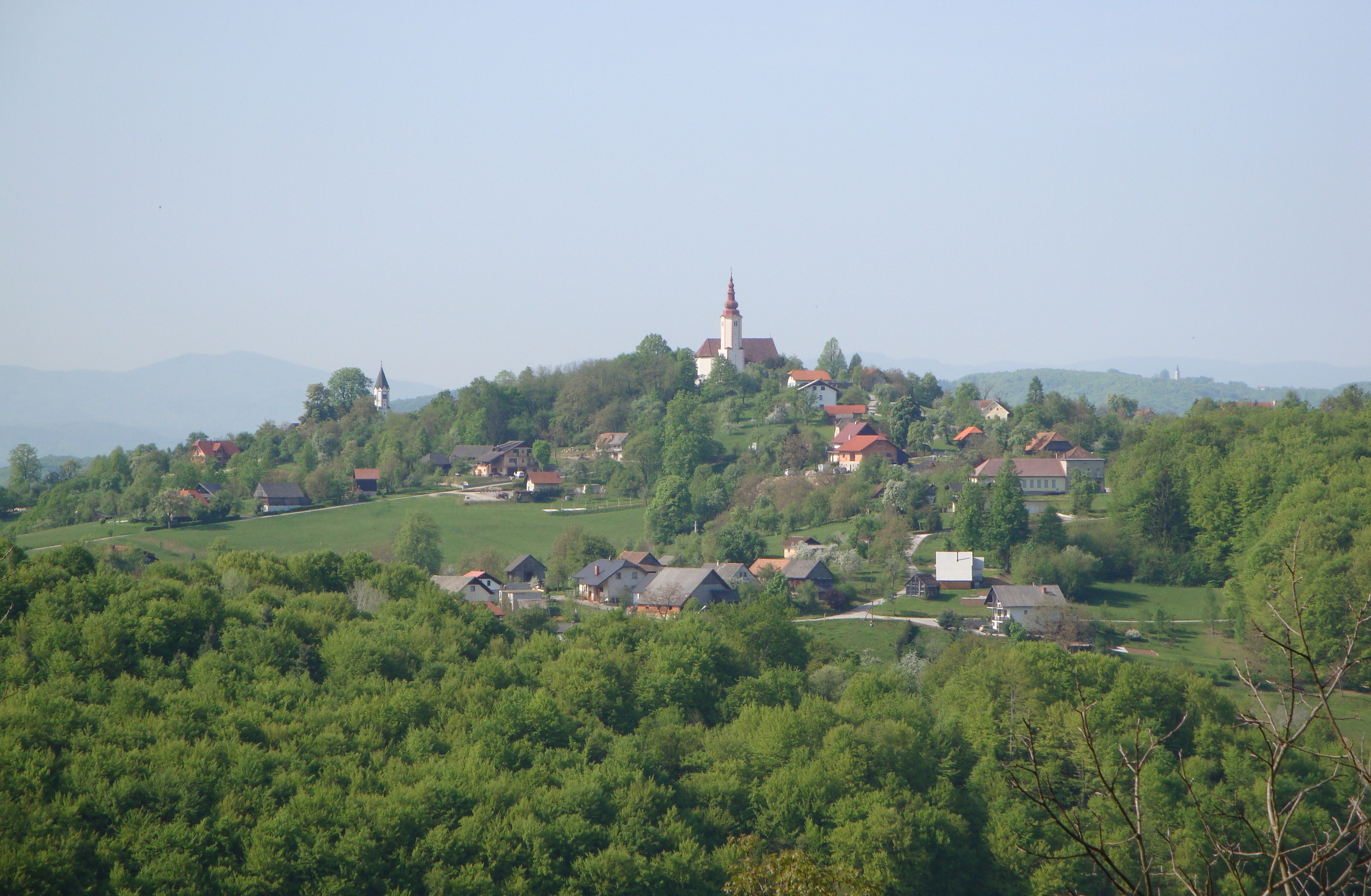

- Location in Slovenia
- Coordinates: 45°55′48.02″N 15°18′51.23″E
- Country: Slovenia
- Traditional region: Lower Carniola
- Statistical region: Southeast Slovenia
- Municipality: Škocjan

Area
  - Total: 1.12 km^{2} (0.43 sq mi)
- Elevation: 272.1 m (893 ft)

Population (2002)
  - Total: 114

Bučka (pronounced [ˈbuːtʃka]; German: Butschka) is a settlement in the Municipality of Škocjan in southeastern Slovenia. Within the municipality, it is the administrative centre of the Local Community of Bučka. The area is part of the historical region of Lower Carniola. The municipality is now included in the Southeast Slovenia Statistical Region. It has a small population. The parish church in the village is dedicated to Saint Matthew and belongs to the Roman Catholic Diocese of Novo Mesto. It was built around 1600. A second church in the settlement is dedicated to Saint Martin.
