= Peter Klepec =

Legendary character in Slovenian and Croatian folklore

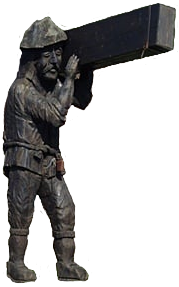
Statue of Peter Klepec by Marijan Leš in Mali Lug.

Peter Klepec, (Croatian: Petar Klepac, dial. Petər Klepəc, Pitr Kljepc) is a legendary character in the Slavic folklore of the Kupa river valley. The most prominent stories involve Klepec being granted supernatural strength, with which he uses a log as a weapon during a battle. The more historical accounts from Mali Lug have an 18th-century setting, but the more legendary accounts are set in the 16th or 15th century, possibly indicating narrative conflation. The historical Klepec served in the Army of the Archduchy of Austria, while the stories assigned to him date from the early Ottoman–Habsburg wars through the early 18th century.

== Birthplace ==
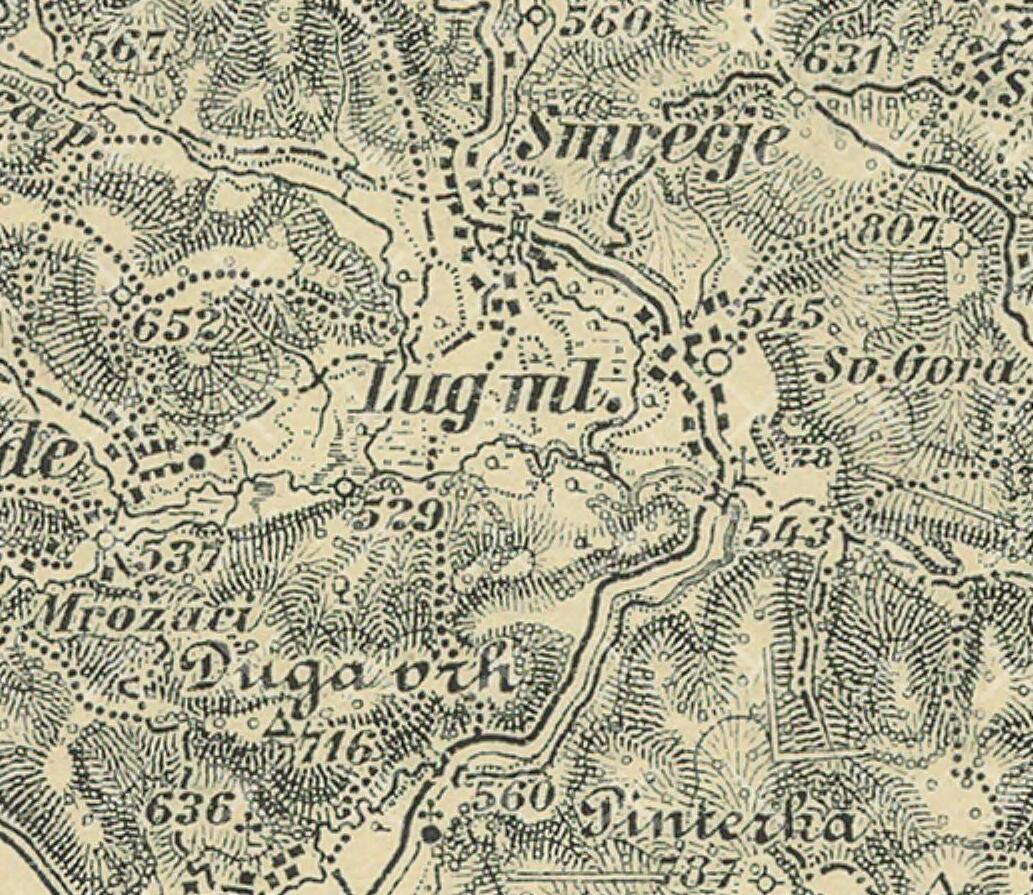
Mali lug as Lug ml. in 1928.

Already in the Zima account of 1828, Mali Lug was designated as the birthplace of Peter Klepec, and the people of Mali Lug were recorded already by Hirc in 1898 to have considered a particular house as his birthplace; one with the year 1712 written above one of the windows and a particularly large ridge beam. The large beam was already mentioned by Zima 1828, which went unpublished until 2010, making Zima and Hirc independent witnesses.

This was contradicted in Poženčan's 1847 version, which gave Osilnica instead. Later sources tended to choose a birthplace along lines of ethnic convenience. Thus, all Croatian sources retain Mali Lug, including Hirc 1892, Hirc 1898 while introducing him as a "hrvatski div" ('Croatian giant'), Jemeršić 1904, Bonifačić Rožin 1953, Jurković 1953, and so on.

Yet 2/15 of the versions collected by Primc gave his birthplace as "Osilnica", in addition to 2/15 as Ribjek and 1/15 as Gorača. And in narratives #265 and #272, which do not give Mali Lug as his place of birth, he still moved to Mali Lug with his mother or his wife. The Klepec house in Mali Log is further mentioned in #267, #276, #277, and #278. For Ožbolt his birthplace was "Plaz" (Note: A market outskit of Osilnica.) but his residence after becoming a shepherd as Mali Lug. This was matched (or repeated) by Jože Ožura, who placed the abode of Klepec with his mother on the outskirts of Osilnica, "morda tam nekje na Selih ali na Puojzu (Note: Dialectal form of Plazu.) ali Potuharici" and states he later moved with his wife to Mali Lug where he built a house. As Primc summarised, in Osilnica it is generally believed he was born there but moved to Mali Lug to build a house, following the Poženčan version, whereas others believed he was born in Mali Lug but served in Osilnica and its environs. Especially among younger residents, the divide became more ethnic than local, and a matter of contention between some Slovenes and Croats, to the extent of conflict over the ethnic identity of Klepec, absent from discussions between residents old enough to have been raised by generations who belonged to the same ethnicity regardless of which side of the river(s) they lived on. The issue is exacerbated by the regional popularity of Hirc's book, whether in rare old copies or the more prevalent 1993 reprint.

== Childhood ==
Poženčan's version related he was the illegitimate child of a poor mother, because of which he was often called a pankert by his shepherd friends, who often teased and beat him. After a chance meeting with an ox who bestows supernatural strength upon him, he is able to overpower his bullies.

=== Source of strength ===
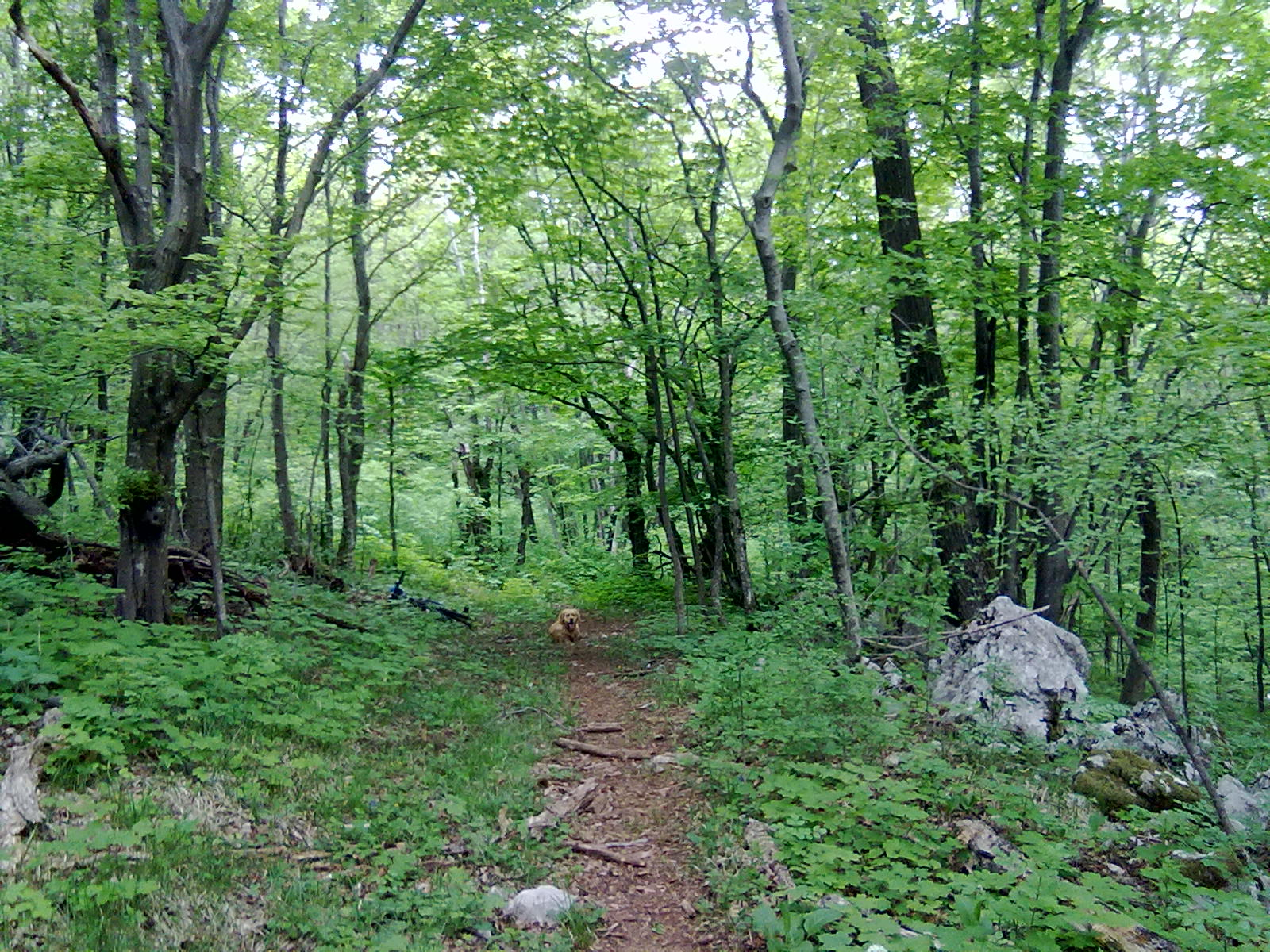
Forest near Gerovo

In the Poženčan account, the meeting with the ox was mentioned without the involvement of a kresnik. Rather, he met the ox on kresni dan (Midsummer), on which oxen fought each other. Klepec complained about the troubles his friends were giving him, to which the ox replied, "Come with me, break off a one year old stick, and strike with it my adversary ‒ the ox that would come to fight me and who is stronger than me ‒ thereby you will help me win, and make yourself strong, so that none will overpower you."

In the Zima account, Klepec was given his power by a kresnik in the form of an ox. In other accounts from the same century, the power mediator is a vila, which lead Hirc to describe Klepec as a "second Prince Marko". (Note: "drugi Kraljević Marko") In still other versions, the mediator is variously God, Mary, or an angel.

The first account related by Hirc in his 1898 book did not involve a vila granting power, but the Mother of God to whom he prayed while on Sveta Gora near Gerovo. After this, Peter possessed such power that he could touch someone and they would fall over, or pull a beech sapling out by its roots.

Hirc 1898 also provided an alternate account, likewise on Sveta Gora, where Klepec met two women lying down, for whom he made a shade to shield them from the sun. They asked him what he would like in return, and he replied, "strength". They told him to pluck a nearby bush up by the roots, but he excused himself, saying he was too weak. They urged him to try anyway, and he succeeded. Then he began plucking young trees, getting stronger all the while.

== Duels ==
Poženčan related a task dictated by the emperor in Vienna to Klepec. A certain large Turk, weighting 90 cents, was challenging his subjects to a duel every day, in exchange for certain land. Such duels were not without historical precedent. (Note: A duel was almost held between ban Nikola Zrinski and beylerbey Mehmed Sokolović Pasha.) Klepec was to duel him. Accompanied by the Turkish sultan and the Austrian emperor, Klepec and the Turk met and ate. Klepec was smaller and ate half a loaf of bread and drank a cup of wine, while the Turk ate nine loaves of bread and drank twelve goblets of wine, staring menacingly at Klepec. After the meal, the wrestling match began, and when they crossed shoulders, Klepec shook his opponent so hard he threw up the wine he had drunk. Klepec won by choking his opponent against the wall.

Hirc gave the story of a different duel featuring Peter Klepec as told to him in Rijeka. His opponent was a large soldier, who bulked up on wine and meat in preparation for the duel. Klepec came to Rijeka, where he ate only dry pears. In front of many spectators, he was wrestled to the ground twice. When his opponent arose the second time, he asked him if it was in jest or for real, to which the opponent answered it was for real. Klepec jumped him and threw him to the ground with such force that he died on the spot.

== Battles ==
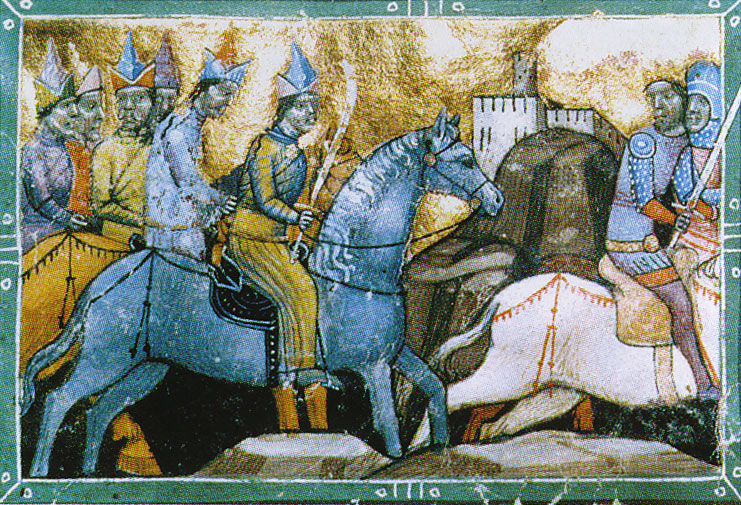
Mongol invasion of Hungary as depicted in the Chronicon Pictum

The Sevčan version, related to him at Osilnica, began the narration with a king who made his camp on Kraljev Vrh, providing an etymology for the village's name lit. "King's Peak". An unnamed enemy encamped in the valley beyond it, and from the enemy encampment a warrior attacked the king's camp, only for Klepec to knock him to the ground with his right hand in the ensuing sword battle, causing the other attacking warriors to flee on horseback. The king pursued the fleeing enemy and slaughtered them. Thanks to the bravery of Peter Klepec, Osilnica and some of the neighbouring villages on the Croatian side were granted nobility or some other special privileges, of which the only remaining privilege in Sevčan's time was the right to transport four barrels of wine from Croatia without taxation. The king was not named in this version, but Sevčan proposed Béla IV of Hungary or some other member of the Árpád dynasty, and the enemy with the Mongols, equating it with another legendary battle, the Battle of Grobnik Field. On the Grobnik polje itself not far from Čavle there is a large stone known as Klepčev kamen or "Klepac's stone", which Hirc himself measured at 1.5 m long and 1 cent heavy, but Hirc related this to Klepec's trading activity, resting on the stone. One time when he was near Čavle he came across a cart whose wheel had broken and multiple people were trying to lift it up unsuccessfully, which Klepec did alone.

Poženčan also relates a battle, although in his version it took place in the immediate aftermath of the duel. Klepec drove the Turkish army to Belgrade and threw tree trunks at them or killed them with thrown tree trunks. At Belgrade, he planted his sword in the ground, assigning power to its sinking and rising from the ground. The sword sunk and rose over the course of the battle, but Klepec ultimately prevailed and the Turks were defeated. The Muscovites were overjoyed with the news of this victory, granting the Austrian emperor part of the land beyond the Danube and giving Klepec hunting license, freeing him from taxation, and whatever he desired.

Hirc relates a battle but in Osilnica, around whose surroundings the Akinji were searching for captives during a raid. The people had fled to the caves, but Peter Klepec was carrying barrels of wine to some foresters at the time. In a ravine between Sveta Gora and Hrib, ten Turks found him and asked him for wine. Peter told them to have a seat but then grabbed a beech sapling and beat the Turks with it, following which they fled through Fažonci to Osilnica and beyond.

In another version according to Hirc, Klepec was the leader of a četa organised in defense from the Turks. He gathered 50 men, placed them at the command of his son, grabbed a wooden beam from a roof, and charged them. The Turks began to flee, and Klepec chased them to Constantinople.

Another story relayed by Hirc involved seven Turks coming to Suhore by Plešce. Klepec had climbed up a tall sweet cherry to pick its fruit. He threw cherries down towards the Turks in one place, who gathered them into a heap. Then a once, he jumped on a branch, breaking it, killing all seven when it fell on them.

== Vienna and Buda ==
In the Poženčan version, word of Peter's strength spread as far as Vienna before he had done anything of note beyond overpowering shepherds. Once called to Vienna by the emperor, he pulled heavy carts through the streets as a feat of strength before meeting the emperor. Before the emperor, he asked for twelve horseshoes. He bent the horseshoes straight with his hands. In Hirc 1898, there were only nine horseshoes and the event took place in Mali Lug instead.

Per Hirc, he was called to Vienna by emperor "Leopold" (Leopold I or Leopold II) for his service (Note: If true, the Kriegsarchiv likely holds information about his service, but historians have yet to search for it.) against the Turks in Slavonia. (Note: Possibly the Slavonian Campaign of the Great Turkish War under Leopold I) The emperor granted him nobility there. Klepec met a certain trader in Buda, whom he visited on occasion for two or three months at a time. At the age of 85, he travelled to Buda one last time, dying there.

== Commemoration ==
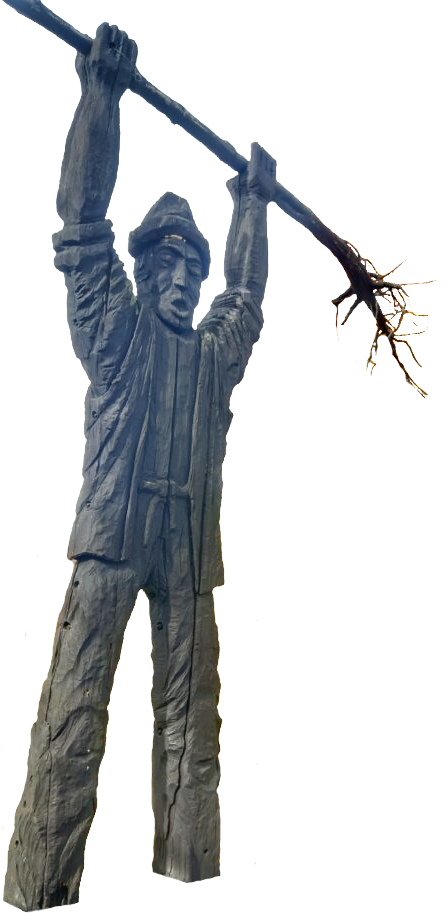
A statue of Peter Klepec by Marijan Leš in Osilnica.

Dragutin Hirc described a painting once kept in a house in Mali Lug of Peter Klepec, girded with sword and spear on his right and with mace and arrow on his left, with "Plemeniti Petar Klepac" written above his head. It was carried by Gerovo townspeople around neighbouring villages and towns as late as around 1840, but it had already been lost by the time Dragutin Hirc visited Mali Lug. On the testimony of Vera Jelenc, there had been a small wooden statue of Klepec in front of the house in that village before WWII, which on the testimony of Josip Klepac was knocked from its stool during a storm and taken to a safer location. The house was set on fire in 1942 by the Italian army.

In the late 1980s, Stanko Nikolić, (Note: Born 1930-10-13 in Hrib pri Fari, died 2019, at the time president of Osilnica's Krajevna skupnost.) resolved to have a statue of Peter Klepec erected in Osilnica to increase its tourism potential, but initial attempts to commission it from Liv Postojna failed. So they built a statue of human height out of rods, which Marijan Leš of Gerovo (Note: Marijan Leš on Facebook, retired carpenter born 1948-09-09 in Vrbovsko. Not to be confused with Marijan Leš of Milanovac, Virovitica, member of its retirement association.) laughed at, offering his own services when asked. Leš made two identical statues of Klepec, erecting one in Osilnica and one in Mirtoviči. (Note: The Mirtoviči statue was relocated in 1997 to the church of Sveta Ana, to be at the administrative entrance to the Osilnica občina, newly elevated to that status.) at the entrance and exit of the municipality of Osilnica along the road. A third identical statue would be made years later. (Note: The third identical statue was erected on Strma Rebra near Čačič on 11 October 2018.) Josip Klepac, (Note: Born 1933, died 2017. Not to be confused with Josip Klepac the constructor, born 1914-03-17 in Čabar, died 2005-10-12 in Zagreb.) among those who claim descent from Peter Klepec, contemplated demolishing the original rod statue in Osilnica together with a group of friends the night after it was erected.

A year or two later, another statue was carved by Stane Jarm, of Osilnica by birth, erected in the Kovač inn there.

The addition of a Peter Klepec commemoration to the annual Petruvo festivities on June 29 further cemented the place of Osilnica in the popular perception of Peter Klepec. But this led to some resentment from neighbouring towns, and especially those across the river where the ethnic identification of the population by that time was Croat. Tensions rose over the Osilnica municipality having three statues while Mali Lug itself no longer had any, and over only the Slovene side of the river having a statue, though this was the result of a local focus rather than broader narrow-mindedness. (Note: At the time, Nikolić was unaware of the existence of the house in Mali Lug.) In the end it was Marijan Leš who eased those tensions by carving a larger, more challenging statue, with the financing of the city of Čabar and wood from the Šumarija Gerovo and Uprava šuma Podružnice Delnice and erecting it in front of the Peter Klepec house in Mali Lug on 20 July 2007.

=== Toponymy ===
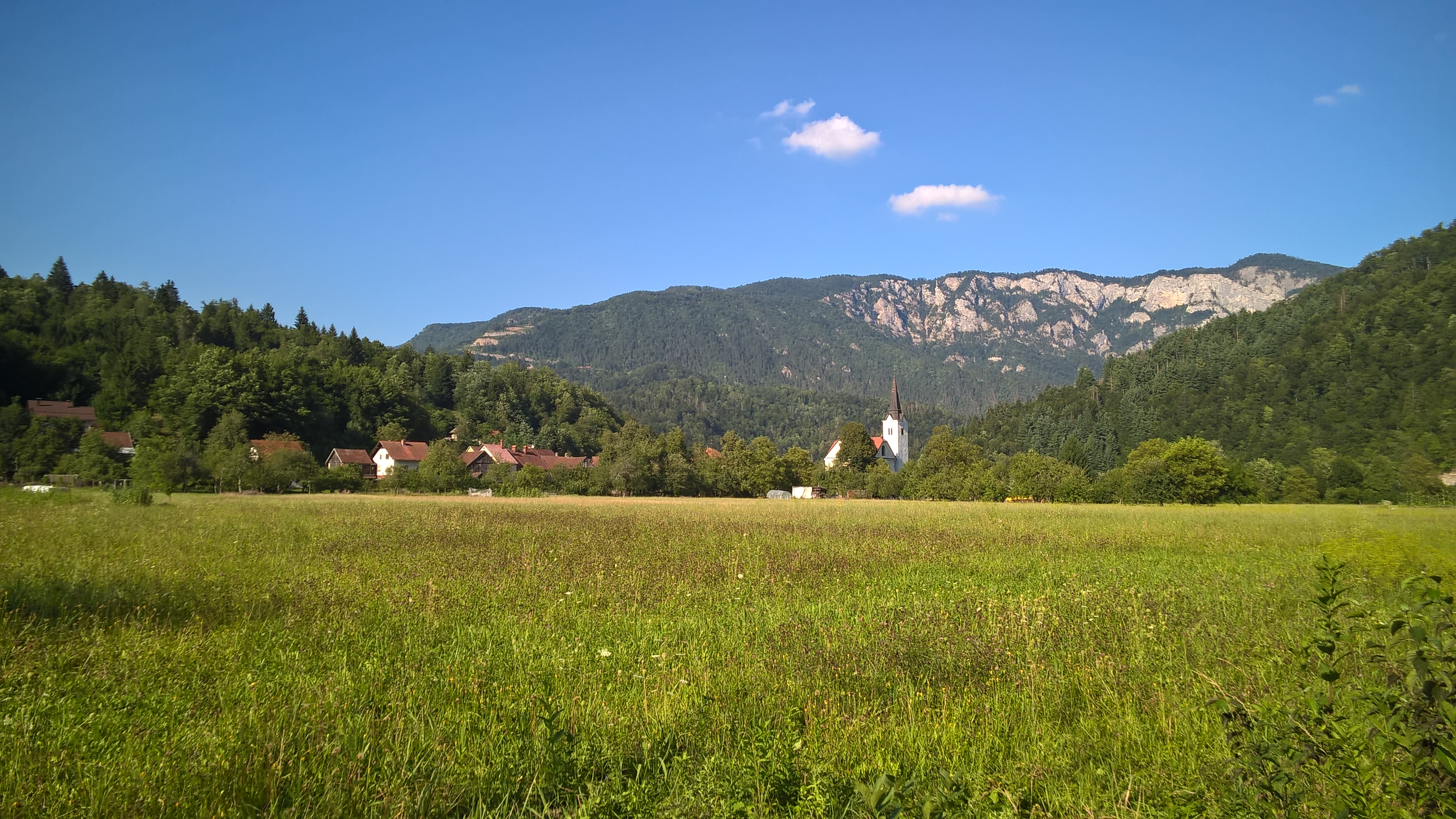
Osilnica with Church of Saints Peter and Paul.

The choice of Osilnica as a birthplace for Peter Klepec is likely motivated by a folk connection of the theme of strength in legends about Peter Klepec to the root siu̯a, silȩ "strength" (Čabar dialect) with the oikonym Osilnica. Given the form of the earliest attestations, Ossiwniz in 1365, Ossawnitz in 1456–1461, and even Ossynnitz in 1498, Snoj proposed instead a derivation from the prefix o- "-ish" (< PSl *o[b]) + adjectival root siv "grey" (< PSl *sivъ) + suffix -nica [objective nominaliser] (< PSl *-nь + *-ica), and the toponym is indeed sometimes attested in the form Osivnica, Semantically, "grey" is more likely to be "shadow" in this case. (Note: There cliffs behind it are grey but it is still separate enough from the cliff that if it were named after the cliff one would expect a nominal root from "cliff" rather than an adjectival root for "grey" unless the cliff itself was named "Grey" and the cliff is not any greyer than surrounding cliffs. It is more probable that Osilnica is a feminine equivalent of Osojnik under dialectal influence. That toponym is well-represented in the oikonymy both on the Kupa river (i.e. Osojnik Jadrčki, Osojnik Kalski) and far (i.e. Osojnik of Dubrovnik, Osojnik of Škofja Loka), and is analysed as the nominal root osoj "shady place" (< PSl *osojь) + suffix -nik [objectiviser] (< PSl *-nь + *-ikъ), and was plausibly motivated by the morning shade of the Dimnica mountain. In place of the usual /-oj-/ comes /-iv-/ in this case, indicating the root *sojь "shade" was substituted with the related root *sivъ yielding *osivъ > [u̯]osiv, modifying Snoj's proposed etymology.)

A story about Peter Klepec plays a role in the folk etymology of the oikonym Turke, well-established by the time of the first written records of Klepec legend in 1828. This etymology has been repeated both critically and uncritically, But the oikonym is actually derived from the surname Turk.

According to Jemeršić, who visited Mali Lug in 1903, the street next to Peter Klepec's house bore his name. The name of this street remains unchanged, as Ulica Petra Klepca.

An apple tree in the vicinity of the house is named after Klepec. Klepec and Klepac is also a local surname, but if it was originally named for Peter and not merely for the later inhabitants of the house with the same surname, then it would be an abnormally long-lived tree. Mali Lug has a Dfb climate and exceptionally high rainfall, averaging over 900 mm/year in the vegetational period and over 2000 mm/year in total, resulting in high growth rates regionally disproportionate to its largely temperature-mediated shorter growing season, which is not conducive to long ages for hardwoods. (Note: The positive effects of lower temperatures have been established, but the effect is partly indirect and its degree has not been determined with confidence as no study has sufficiently separated relevant factors with a sample size large and diverse enough for the findings to be conclusive. Thanks to the prevalence of heart rot, it is more difficult to date hardwood trees at lifespan extremes, but even softwoods that reach extreme ages without the benefits of gigantism inhabit climates characterised more by extreme aridity than by extremely cold.) To this can be added an average annual humidity of around 90%, which increases disease infection rates, both fungal and bacterial. Being in cultivation since the Late Neolithic or Early to Middle Bronze Age even in Europe, Malus domestica lost much of its genetic diversity and the historical focus on form and fruit traits at the expense of disease resistance outside of epidemics led to the apple being plagued with low lifespan, exacerbated by annual exposure to disease during trimming. So while one Malus sieversii individual under the favourable conditions of a BSk/Dwc was genetically dated to over 600 years old, no M. domestica trees are known to survive even from the 18th century, to which at least part of the construction of the Klepec house is dated. One of the oldest living individuals is the Dosch Yellow Bellflower Apple from 1850 with a Csb climate, since the Old Apple Tree in the same region died in 2020 at the age of 194, but in climates closer to that in Mali Lug, few trees have been estimated to be much more than 120 years old, an example being an individual of the Citronka zimna variety in Zabudišová near Bošáca. Older individuals from similar climates do exist, but special circumstances are often responsible for their longevity. Such is the case with the over 210 year old but dying Bramley Apple Tree, ungrafted and revered as the originator of the Bramley apple variety.

== In phraseology ==
The comparative phrase "as strong as Peter Klepec" saw literary use as early as 1877, but with at least one exception it remained a largely local phrase until after the publication of Cankar's retelling in 1917, which is still read in some schools today. After the popularisation of Klepec tales beyond traditional limits, this phrase continued to be used, in addition to its expansion to new domains of phraseology.

== In popular culture ==
There have been a number of films about Peter Klepec, in addition to fictionalised accounts in other media. In Gerovo, the local motor club, AKK Petar Klepac, is named after him. In Cerkno, the local preschool, Vrtec Peter Klepec, is named after him.

== Selected reading ==
- Sevčan, L. (1846-12-16) [continued 1846-12-23]. "Peter Klepec, silni slovenski junak". Kmetijske in rokodelske novice (in Slovenian). Vol. 4, no. 50. pp. 200, 204. ISSN 1318-9832. Online publication 2011-02-15.
- Matevž Ravnikar - Poženčan (1847-05-26). "Še ena povest od Petra Klepca". Kmetijske in rokodelske novice (in Slovenian). Vol. 5, no. 21. p. 84. ISSN 1318-9832. Online publication 2009-09-24.
- Hirc, Dragutin (1898) [written 1898-02-08]. "Petar Klepac". Gorski kotar: slike, opisi i putopisi (in Croatian). Illustrated by Václav Lev Anderle. Zagreb: 🖶 Lavoslav Hartman (Kugli i Deutsch). pp. 146–149. Republished as Hirc, Dragutin (1993) [written 1898-02-08]. "Petar Klepac". Gorski kotar: slike, opisi i putopisi (in Croatian). Illustrated by Václav Lev Anderle. Rijeka: 🖶 Tiskara Rijeka. pp. 146–149. ISBN 953-158-004-9.
- Cankar, Ivan (1917). "Peter Klepec". Podobe iz sanj. Nova knjižnica (in Slovenian). Vol. 1. Ljubljana: Nova založba, 🖶 Katoliška tiskarna. pp. 40–43. Online publication 2009-09-17.
- Bevk, France (2014-12-29) [1956]. Kopljar, Marija (ed.). Peter Klepec (in Slovenian) – via Wikisource.
- Ožbolt, Anton (1974). Dežela Petra Klepca (in Slovenian). Ljubljana: Ljubljana.
- Primc, Jože (1991). "Peter Klepec in njegova dežela". Rival: časopis za književnost (in Slovenian). 5 (1). Rijeka: Centar društvenih djelatnosti mladih Rijeka: 166–168. ISSN 0353-2968.
- Primc, Jože (1997). Okameneli mož in druge zgodbe iz Zgornje Kolpske doline (od Babnega Polja in Prezida prek Gerova, Čabra, Osilnice, Kužlja, Kostela, Fare do Dola in Predgrada) (in Slovenian). Ljubljana: Kmečki glas.
- Malnar, Slavko (2004). Petar Klepac. Rijeka, Čabar: Ogranak Matice hrvatske u Čabru, Adamić. ISBN 9789532191882.
- Moric, Anja; Perinić Lewis, Ana (2019). "Peter Klepec – silni slovensko-hrvaški junak?". Močni, modri in dobri: O junakih slovenske folklore. Zupaničeva knjižnica (in Slovenian). Vol. 48. Ljubljana: Znanstvena založba Filozofske fakultete Univerze v Ljubljani, 🖶 Birografika Bori. pp. 109–140. ISBN 978-961-06-0262-0.
