= Bosljiva Loka =

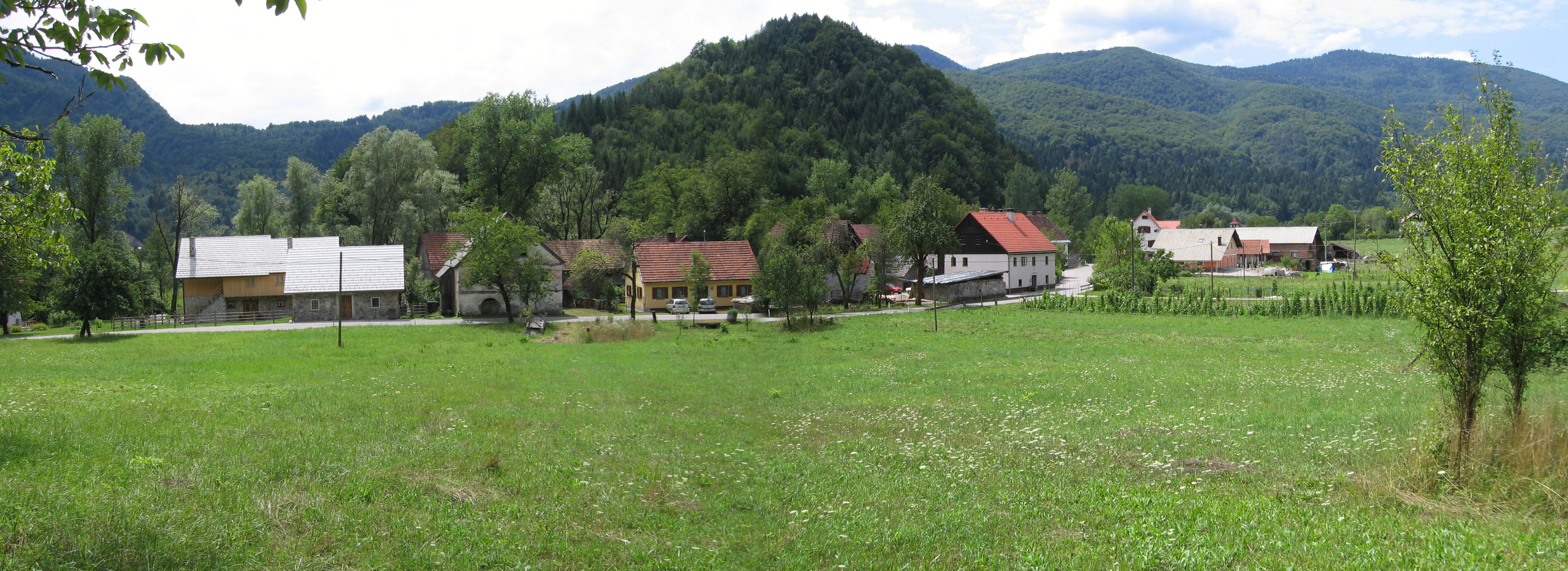

- Location in Slovenia
- Coordinates: 45°30′46.99″N 14°46′0.87″E
- Country: Slovenia
- Traditional region: Lower Carniola
- Statistical region: Southeast Slovenia
- Municipality: Osilnica

Area
  - Total: 5.09 km^{2} (1.97 sq mi)
- Elevation: 261.3 m (857 ft)

Population (2002)
  - Total: 27
- Postal code: 1337

Bosljiva Loka (pronounced [bɔˈsljiːʋa ˈloːka]; German: Wosail) is a small settlement on the left bank of the Kolpa River in the Municipality of Osilnica in southern Slovenia. The area is part of the traditional region of Lower Carniola and is now included in the Southeast Slovenia Statistical Region.

== Name ==
Bosljiva Loka was attested in written sources as Wosseyl in 1498.

== Church ==
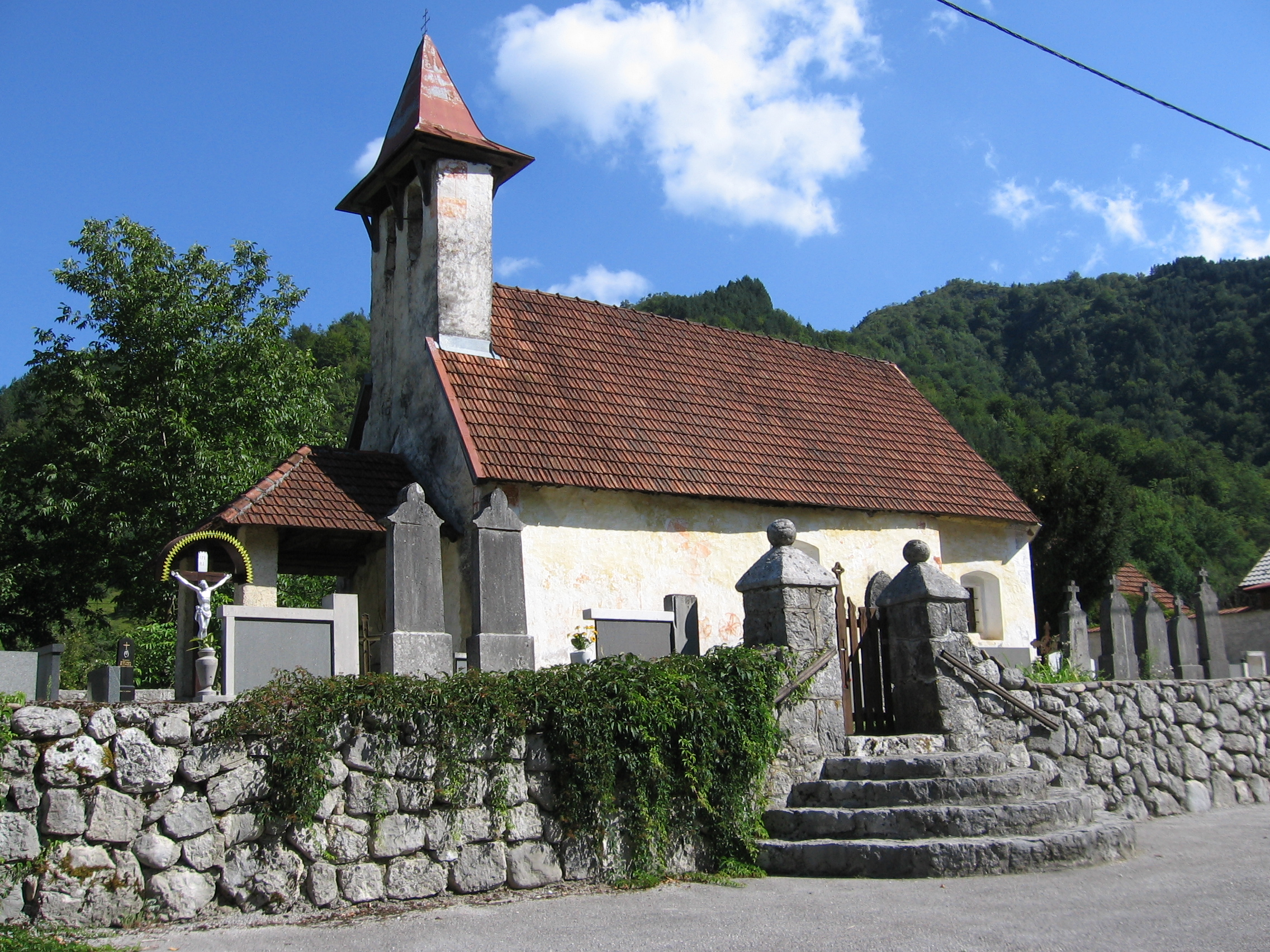
Saint Vitus's Church

The local church is dedicated to Saint Vitus and belongs to the Parish of Osilnica. It dates to the late 16th or early 17th century and has a rectangular nave and a three-sided sanctuary with a small belfry above its entrance. Some fragments of wall paintings survive on the interior and exterior walls. Its main altar dates to the late 18th century.

== Gallery ==
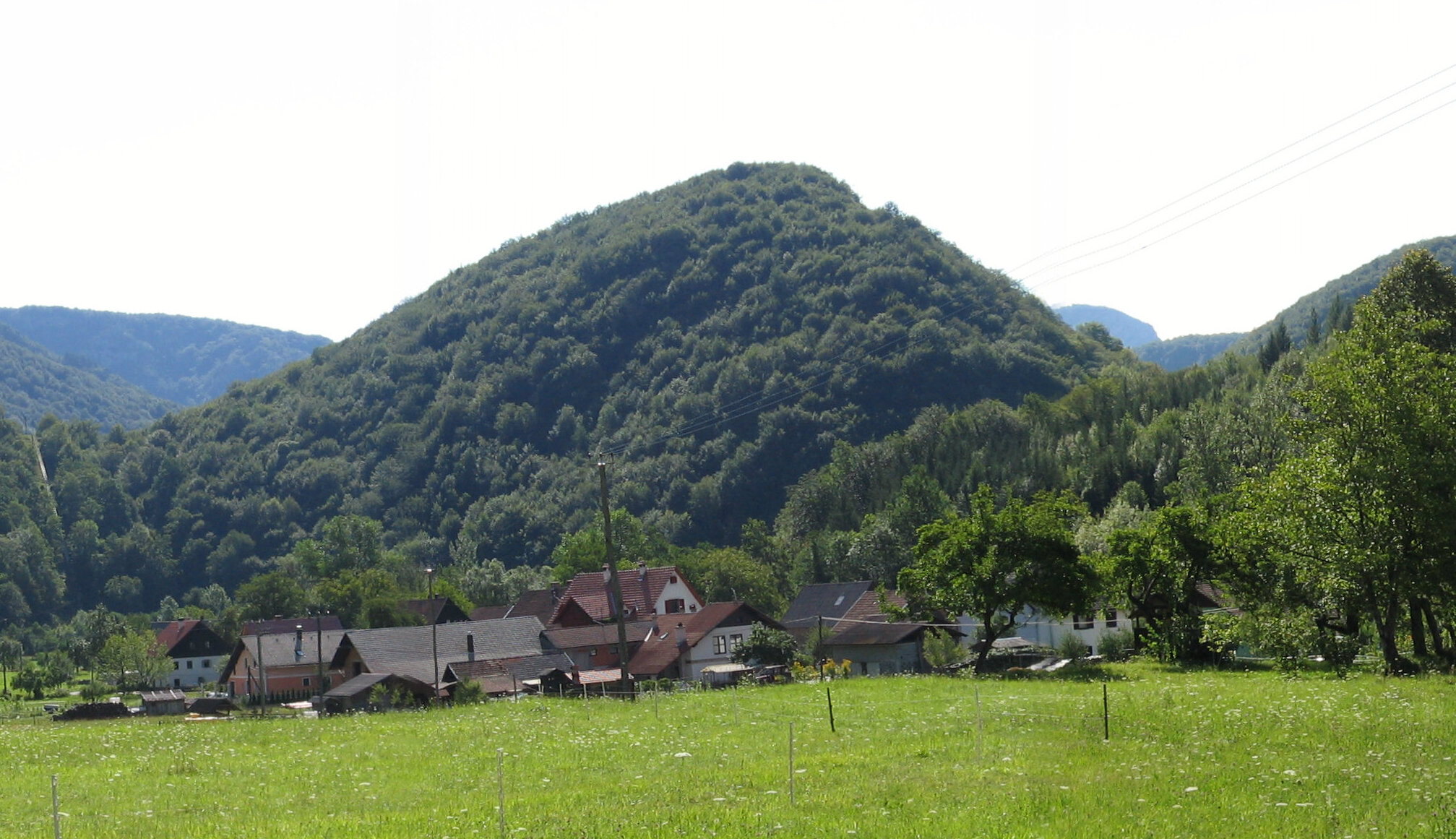
Mertovec Hill
