= Križmani =

- Location in Slovenia
- Coordinates: 45°32′34.07″N 14°42′31.14″E
- Country: Slovenia
- Traditional region: Lower Carniola
- Statistical region: Southeast Slovenia
- Municipality: Osilnica

Area
  - Total: 0.35 km^{2} (0.14 sq mi)
- Elevation: 454.7 m (1,492 ft)

Population (2002)
  - Total: 15
- Postal code: 1337

Križmani (pronounced [ˈkɾiːʒmani]; in older sources also Križmane, German: Krischman) is a small settlement in the hills above the left bank of the Kolpa River in the Municipality of Osilnica in southern Slovenia. The area is part of the traditional region of Lower Carniola and is now included in the Southeast Slovenia Statistical Region.
