= Ribjek, Osilnica =

Ribjek
- Location in Slovenia
- Coordinates: 45°31′57.98″N 14°43′51.06″E
- Country: Slovenia
- Traditional region: Lower Carniola
- Statistical region: Southeast Slovenia
- Municipality: Osilnica

Area
  - Total: 2.53 km^{2} (0.98 sq mi)
- Elevation: 300 m (980 ft)

Population (2002)
  - Total: 18
- Postal code: 1337

Ribjek (pronounced [ˈɾiːbjɛk]; German: Fischbach) is a village on the left bank of the Kolpa River in the Municipality of Osilnica in southern Slovenia. The area is part of the traditional region of Lower Carniola and is now included in the Southeast Slovenia Statistical Region.

== Church ==
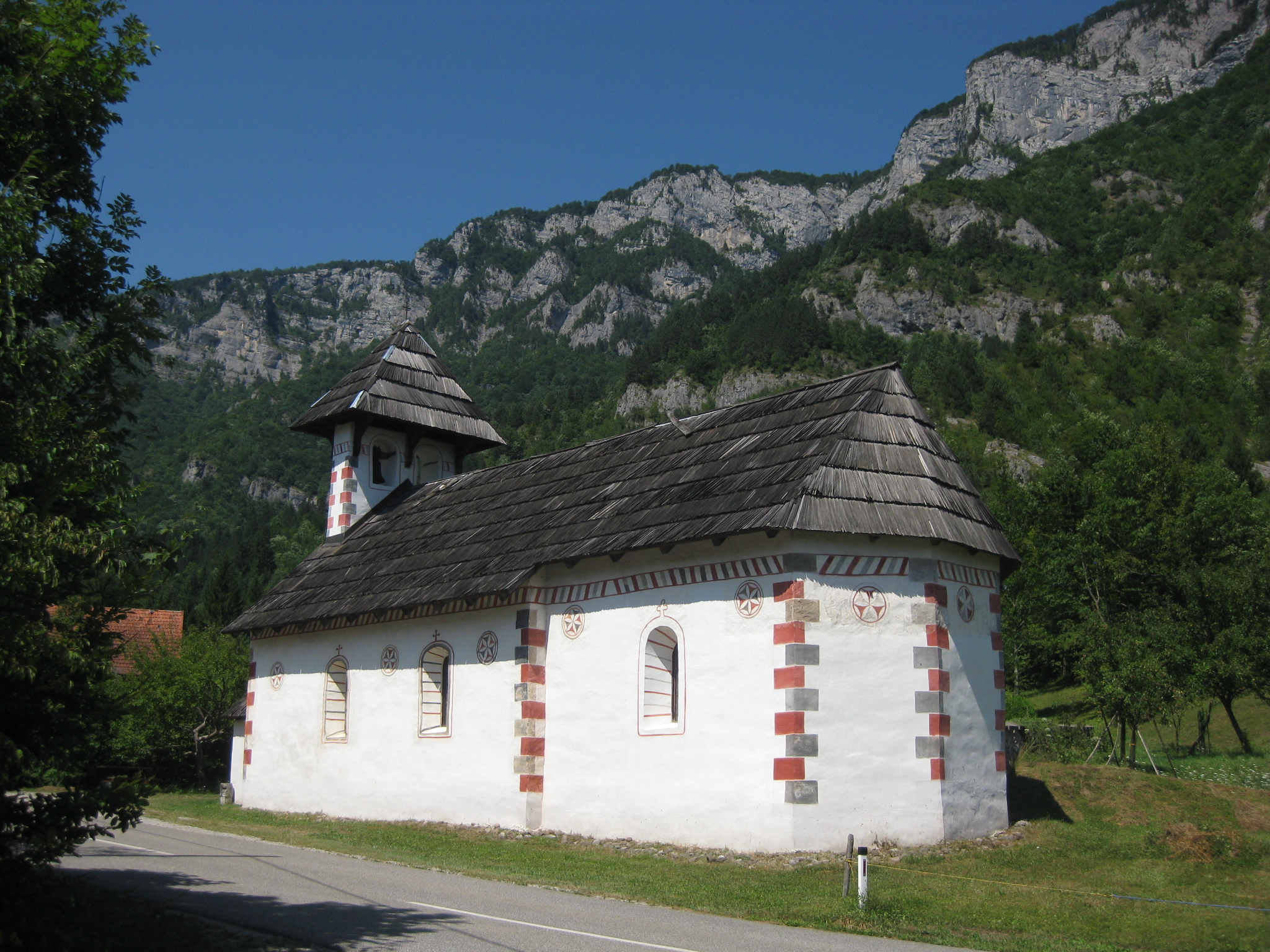
St. Giles's Church in Ribjek

The local church is dedicated to Saint Giles and belongs to the Parish of Osilnica. It is a single-naved building with an open porch and a small belfry, but it is best known for its impressive painted wooden panelled ceiling. It dates to the late 16th or early 17th century and has been built in the late Renaissance style.

== Nature ==
Lepidoptera include Zygaena filipendulae.

== Notable people ==
Notable people that were born or lived in Ribjek include:

- Peter Klepec, legendary figure
