= Podvrh, Osilnica =

Podvrh
- Location in Slovenia
- Coordinates: 45°32′33.64″N 14°41′53.34″E
- Country: Slovenia
- Traditional region: Lower Carniola
- Statistical region: Southeast Slovenia
- Municipality: Osilnica

Area
  - Total: 1.19 km^{2} (0.46 sq mi)
- Elevation: 451.5 m (1,481 ft)

Population (2002)
  - Total: 4
- Postal code: 1337

Podvrh (pronounced [pɔˈdʋəɾx]) is a small settlement in the hills above the left bank of the Kolpa River in the Municipality of Osilnica in southern Slovenia. It lies in the traditional region of Lower Carniola and is now included in the Southeast Slovenia Statistical Region.

There is a small chapel-shrine in the settlement dedicated to the Virgin Mary. It dates from 1840.

== Nature ==
Local Lepidoptera include Adscita statices, Jordanita globulariae and Zygaena purpuralis.
