= Sela, Osilnica =

Sela
- Location in Slovenia
- Coordinates: 45°31′45.95″N 14°41′26.86″E
- Country: Slovenia
- Traditional region: Lower Carniola
- Statistical region: Southeast Slovenia
- Municipality: Osilnica

Area
  - Total: 0.81 km^{2} (0.31 sq mi)
- Elevation: 314.1 m (1,031 ft)

Population (2002)
  - Total: 74
- Postal code: 1337

Sela (pronounced [ˈseːla]) is a settlement west of Osilnica in southern Slovenia, right on the border with Croatia. The area is part of the traditional region of Lower Carniola and is now included in the Southeast Slovenia Statistical Region.

== Notable people ==
Notable people that were born or lived in Sela include:

- Peter Klepec, legendary figure
