= Malinišče =

- Location in Slovenia
- Coordinates: 45°32′14.05″N 14°43′0.28″E
- Country: Slovenia
- Traditional region: Lower Carniola
- Statistical region: Southeast Slovenia
- Municipality: Osilnica

Area
  - Total: 0.32 km^{2} (0.12 sq mi)
- Elevation: 369.6 m (1,213 ft)
- Postal code: 1337

Malinišče (pronounced [maˈliːniʃtʃɛ]; in older sources also Malinšek, German: Malinschek) is a small settlement above the left bank of the Kolpa River in the Municipality of Osilnica in southern Slovenia. The area is part of the traditional region of Lower Carniola and is now included in the Southeast Slovenia Statistical Region.
