= Ložec =

- Location in Slovenia
- Coordinates: 45°31′29.22″N 14°44′24.38″E
- Country: Slovenia
- Traditional region: Lower Carniola
- Statistical region: Southeast Slovenia
- Municipality: Osilnica

Area
  - Total: 0.88 km^{2} (0.34 sq mi)
- Elevation: 277.8 m (911 ft)

Population (2002)
  - Total: 15
- Postal code: 1337

Ložec (pronounced [ˈloːʒəts]; German: Loschez) is a small settlement on the left bank of the Kolpa River in the Municipality of Osilnica in southern Slovenia. It belongs to the traditional region of Lower Carniola and is now included in the Southeast Slovenia Statistical Region.

== Nature ==
Local Lepidoptera include Zygaena filipendulae, Z. lonicerae, Z. loti and Z. purpuralis.
