= Bezuljak =

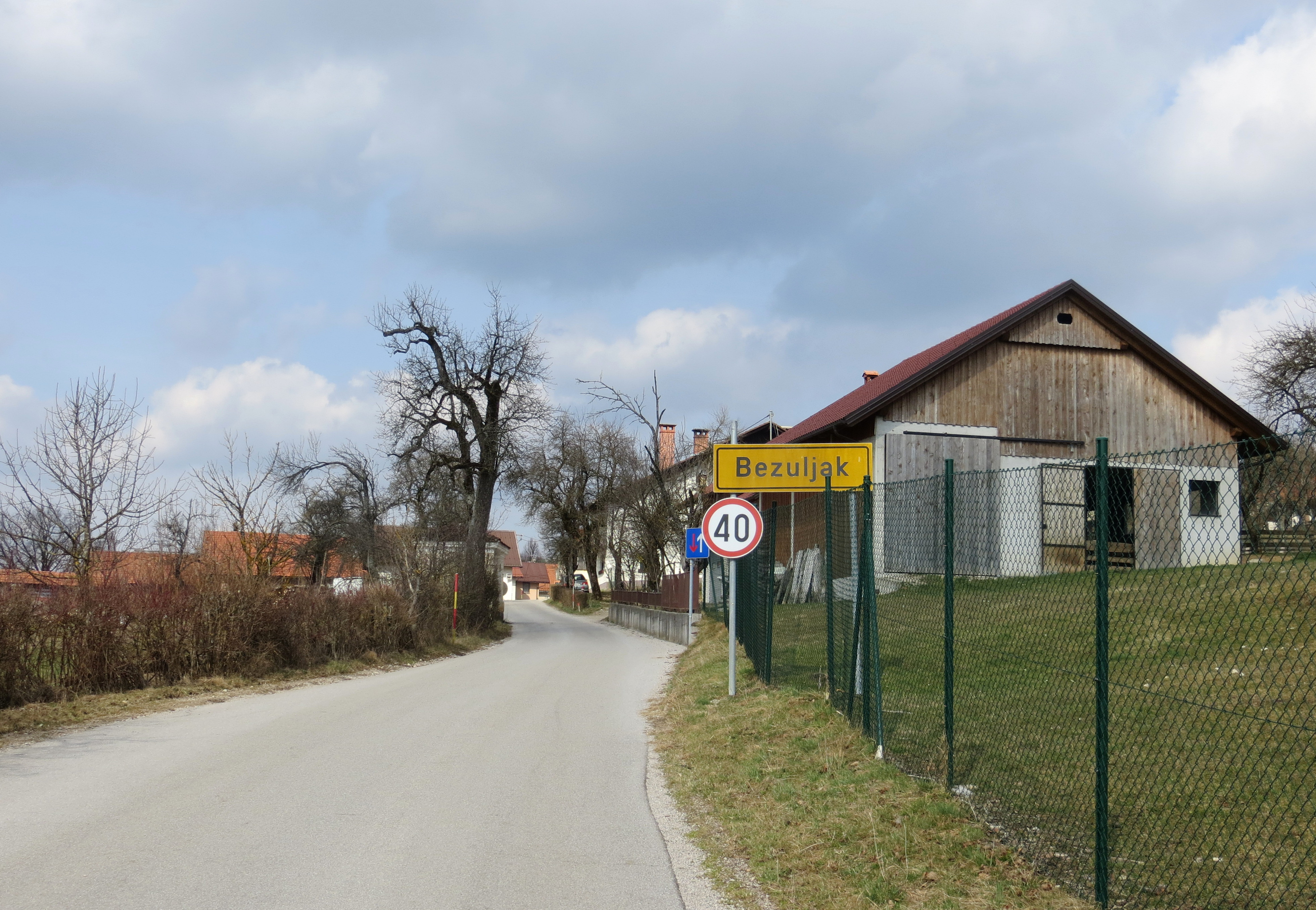

- Location in Slovenia
- Coordinates: 45°50′4.86″N 14°22′8.33″E
- Country: Slovenia
- Traditional region: Inner Carniola
- Statistical region: Littoral–Inner Carniola
- Municipality: Cerknica

Area
  - Total: 8.3 km^{2} (3.2 sq mi)
- Elevation: 640.7 m (2,102 ft)

Population (2020)
  - Total: 82
  - Density: 9.9/km^{2} (26/sq mi)

Bezuljak (pronounced [bəzuˈljaːk], German: Wesulak) is a village north of Begunje pri Cerknici in the Municipality of Cerknica in the Inner Carniola region of Slovenia.

== Name ==
Bezuljak was attested in written records as Holaer in 1260, Oleren in 1261, and Holleren in 1321, among other spellings. The name Bezuljak is derived from the Slavic common noun *bъzъ 'elder', thus originally referring to the vegetation. Similar names based on the same root are common in Slovenian ethnic territory (e.g., Basovizza in Italy and Bezgovica) as well as in other Slavic areas (e.g., Bazje in Croatia, Bzová in the Czech Republic, etc.).

Some other suggested explanations of the name are connected with pasturing, Ottoman attacks, or geographical features.

== History ==
Bezuljak was mentioned as early as the second half of the 13th century as a property of the Carthusian monastery at Bistra. During the Second World War, the Partisans attacked an Italian post in the village on the night of 19 October 1941.

=== Mass grave ===
Bezuljak is the site of a mass grave associated with the Second World War. The Matevž Shaft Mass Grave (Slovene: Grobišče Matevževo brezno) lies northwest of the village, in the Ravnik Valley, in an overgrown area with many sinkholes. It contains the remains of an unknown number of victims at a depth of two meters.

== Church ==
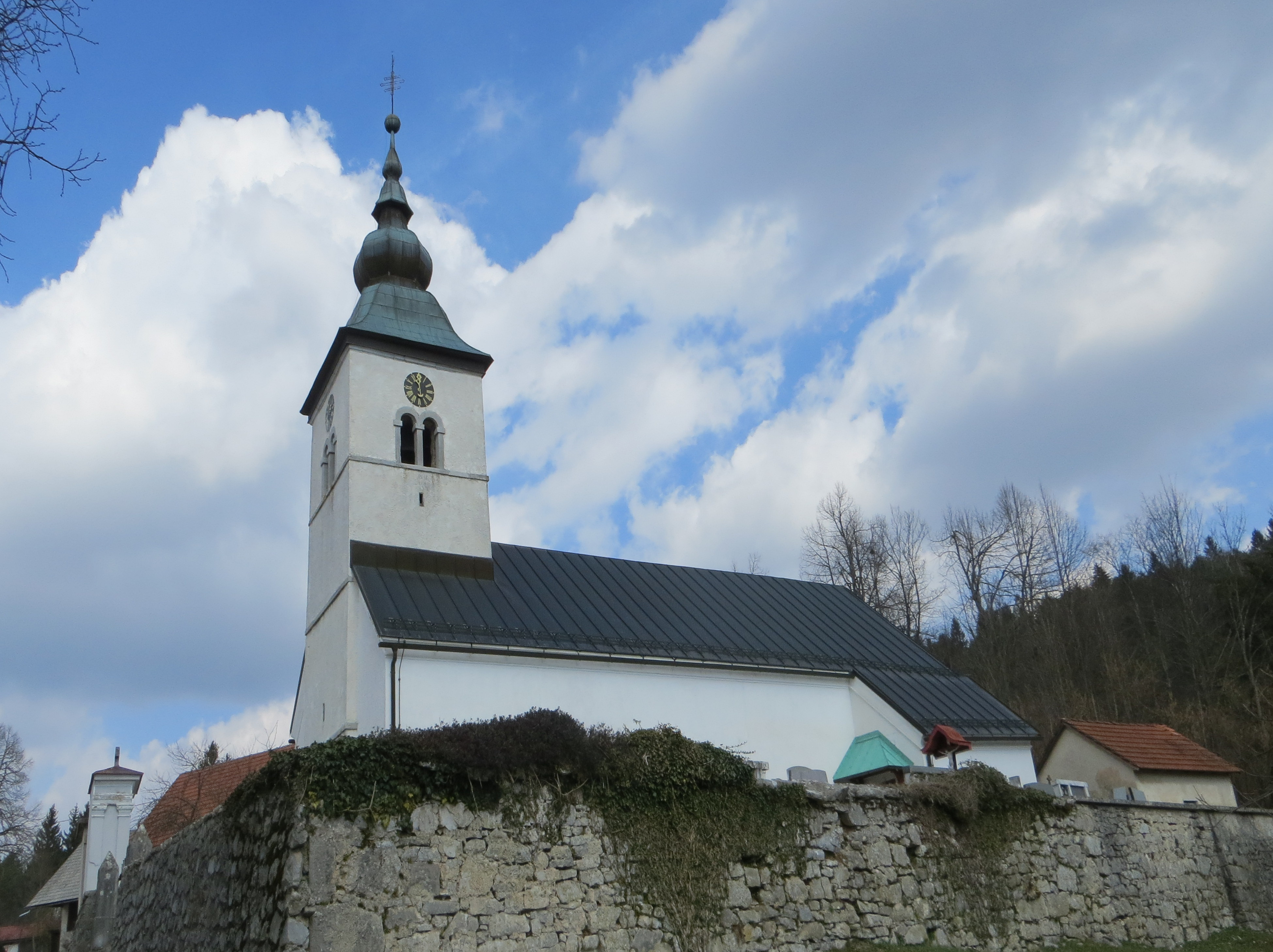
Assumption Church

The local church in the settlement is dedicated to the Assumption of Mary and belongs to the Parish of Begunje pri Cerknici.

== Notable people ==
Notable people that were born or lived in Bezuljak include:

- Alojz Anton Popek (a.k.a. Vandek) (1920–1943), Partisan and People's Hero of Yugoslavia
