= Padovo pri Osilnici =

- Location in Slovenia
- Coordinates: 45°32′30.89″N 14°42′56.97″E
- Country: Slovenia
- Traditional region: Lower Carniola
- Statistical region: Southeast Slovenia
- Municipality: Osilnica

Area
  - Total: 0.47 km^{2} (0.18 sq mi)
- Elevation: 481 m (1,578 ft)

Population (2002)
  - Total: 13
- Postal code: 1337

Padovo pri Osilnici (pronounced [ˈpaːdɔʋɔ pɾi ɔˈsiːu̯nitsi]; in older sources also Padova, German: Padua) is a small settlement in the hills above the left bank of the Kolpa River in the Municipality of Osilnica in southern Slovenia. The area is part of the traditional region of Lower Carniola and is now included in the Southeast Slovenia Statistical Region.

== Name ==
The name of the settlement was changed from Padovo to Padovo pri Osilnici in 1953. In the past the German name was Padua.
