= Grintovec pri Osilnici =

- Location in Slovenia
- Coordinates: 45°31′10.83″N 14°44′58.1″E
- Country: Slovenia
- Traditional region: Lower Carniola
- Statistical region: Southeast Slovenia
- Municipality: Osilnica

Area
  - Total: 4.35 km^{2} (1.68 sq mi)
- Elevation: 270.4 m (887 ft)

Population (2002)
  - Total: 15
- Postal code: 1337

Grintovec pri Osilnici (pronounced [ˈɡɾiːntɔʋəts pɾi ɔˈsiːu̯nitsi]; German: Grintouz) is a small settlement on the left bank of the Kolpa River in the Municipality of Osilnica in southern Slovenia. The area is part of the traditional region of Lower Carniola and is now included in the Southeast Slovenia Statistical Region.

== Name ==
The name of the settlement was changed from Grintovec to Grintovec pri Osilnici in 1953. In the past the German name was Grintouz.
