= Bezgarji =

- Location in Slovenia
- Coordinates: 45°33′42.73″N 14°42′25.71″E
- Country: Slovenia
- Traditional region: Lower Carniola
- Statistical region: Southeast Slovenia
- Municipality: Osilnica

Area
  - Total: 2.54 km^{2} (0.98 sq mi)
- Elevation: 438.9 m (1,440 ft)

Population (2002)
  - Total: 9
- Postal code: 1337

Bezgarji (pronounced [bəˈzɡaːɾji]; German: Wisgarn) is a small settlement in the Municipality of Osilnica in southern Slovenia. It lies in the traditional region of Lower Carniola and is now included in the Southeast Slovenia Statistical Region.
