= Spodnji Čačič =

- Location in Slovenia
- Coordinates: 45°32′40.9″N 14°42′45.39″E
- Country: Slovenia
- Traditional region: Lower Carniola
- Statistical region: Southeast Slovenia
- Municipality: Osilnica

Area
  - Total: 0.07 km^{2} (0.027 sq mi)
- Elevation: 545.3 m (1,789 ft)

Population (2002)
  - Total: 0
- Postal code: 1337

Spodnji Čačič (pronounced [ˈspoːdnji ˈtʃaːtʃitʃ]; German: Untertschatschitsch) is a small settlement in the Municipality of Osilnica in southern Slovenia. The area is part of the traditional region of Lower Carniola and is now included in the Southeast Slovenia Statistical Region.

The local church in the settlement is dedicated to Saint Nicholas and belongs to the Parish of Osilnica. It was first mentioned in documents dating to 1526. In 1823 it was extended and in 1942 it was burned down together with the whole settlement. After 1945 it was rebuilt.
