= Zgornji Čačič =

- Location in Slovenia
- Coordinates: 45°32′49.01″N 14°42′48.58″E
- Country: Slovenia
- Traditional region: Lower Carniola
- Statistical region: Southeast Slovenia
- Municipality: Osilnica

Area
  - Total: 0.8 km^{2} (0.31 sq mi)
- Elevation: 601.3 m (1,973 ft)

Population (2002)
  - Total: 6
- Postal code: 1337

Zgornji Čačič (pronounced [ˈzɡoːɾnji ˈtʃaːtʃitʃ]; German: Obertschatschitsch) is a small settlement in the Municipality of Osilnica in southern Slovenia. It is part of the traditional region of Lower Carniola and is now included in the Southeast Slovenia Statistical Region.
