= Osilnica =

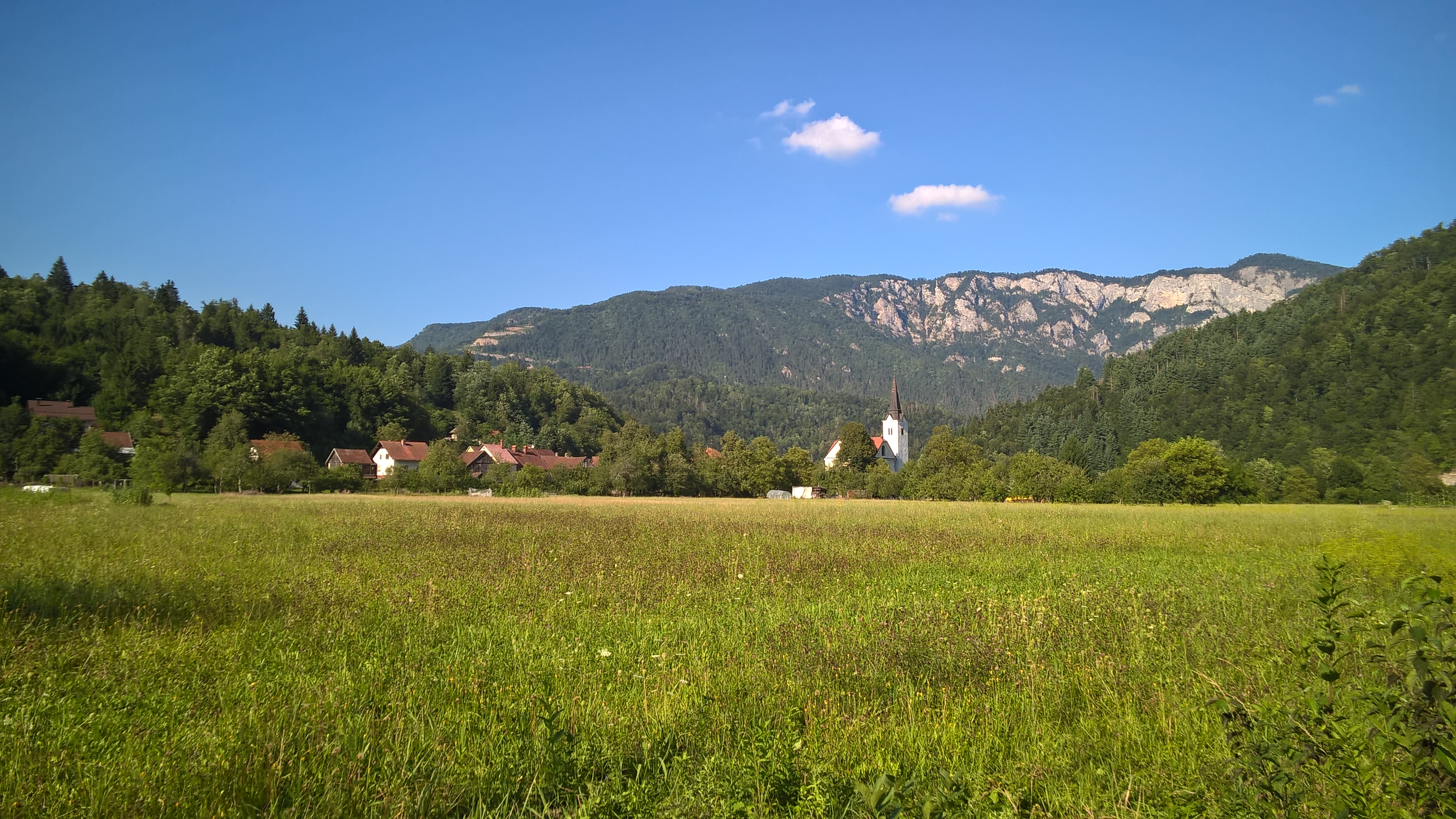

- Location in Slovenia
- Coordinates: 45°31′44″N 14°41′54″E
- Country: Slovenia
- Traditional region: Lower Carniola
- Statistical region: Southeast Slovenia
- Municipality: Osilnica

Area
  - Total: 1.1 km^{2} (0.42 sq mi)
- Elevation: 293.6 m (963 ft)

Population (2020)
  - Total: 76
- Postal code: 1337

Osilnica (pronounced [ɔˈsiːu̯nitsa], in older sources also Osivnica, German: Ossiunitz) is a settlement in southern Slovenia. It is located on the left bank of the Kolpa River next to the border with Croatia. It is part of the traditional region of Lower Carniola and is now included in the Southeast Slovenia Statistical Region. It is the largest settlement and the seat of the Municipality of Osilnica.

The Čabranka, a small river on the border between Slovenia and Croatia and a left tributary of the Kupa River, joins the Kupa at Osilnica.

== Name ==
Osilnica was attested in historical sources in 1365 as Ossiwniz (and as Ossawnitz in 1456–61 and Ossynnitz in 1498). The name may be derived from the adjective osiv 'grayish'. Derivation from *osьlьnica (< *osьlъ 'donkey' or *osьla 'whetstone') has also been proposed, but is less convincing for vocalic reasons.

== History ==
The Osilnica volunteer fire department became a founding unit of the Kočevje municipal fire department on 28 August 1955.

== Church ==
The parish church in Osilnica is dedicated to Saints Peter and Paul and belongs to the Roman Catholic Diocese of Novo Mesto. It has a cruciform floor plan and was built in 1876 on the site of a 16th-century building.

== Nature ==
Local Lepidoptera include Adscita statices, Zygaena filipendulae, Z. lonicerae, Z. purpuralis, Z. viciae and Z. transalpina.

== Notable people ==
Notable people that were born or lived in Osilnica include:

- Peter Klepec, legendary figure
- Stane Jarm (1931–2011), sculptor

== Gallery ==
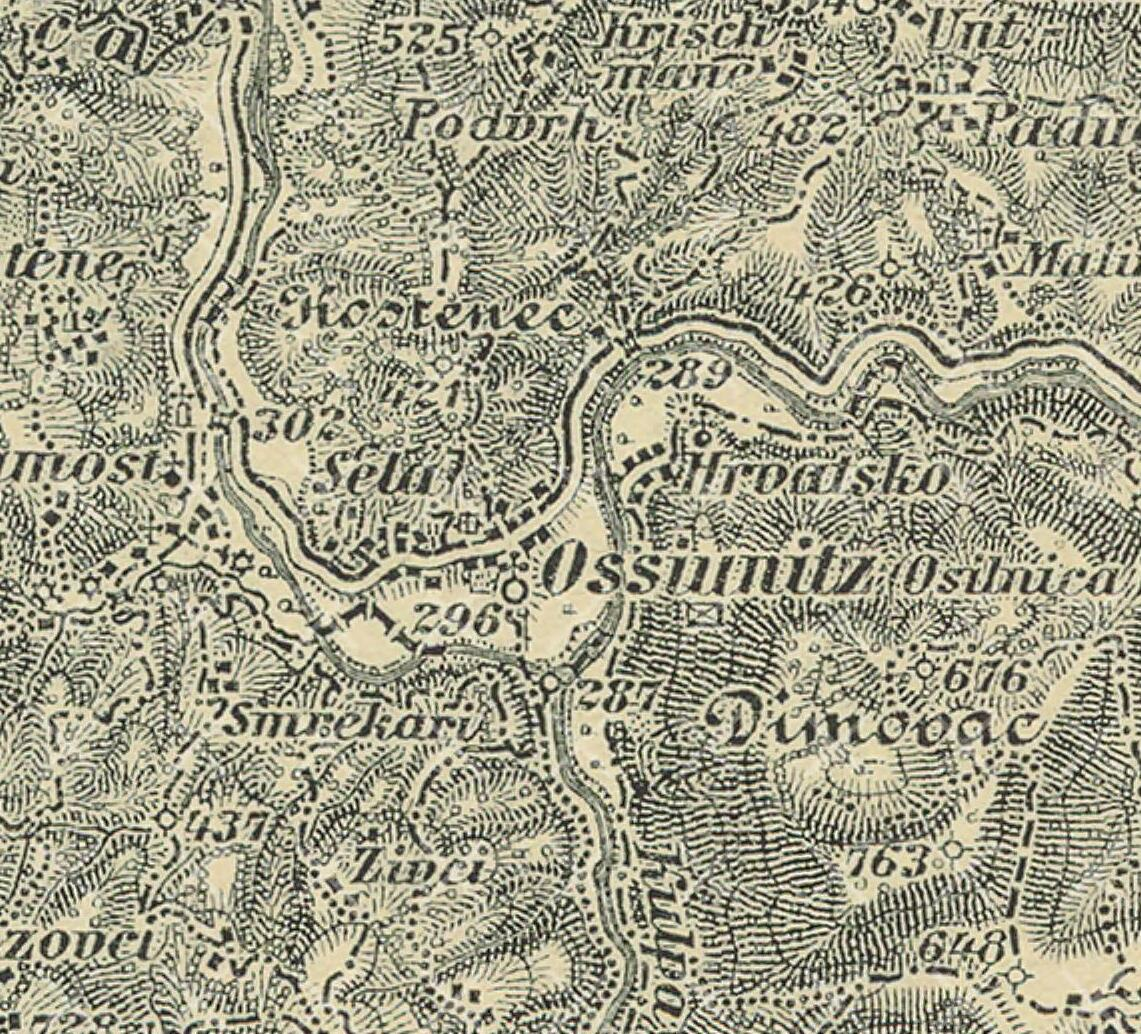
Osilnica as Osiunitza on a 1928 map

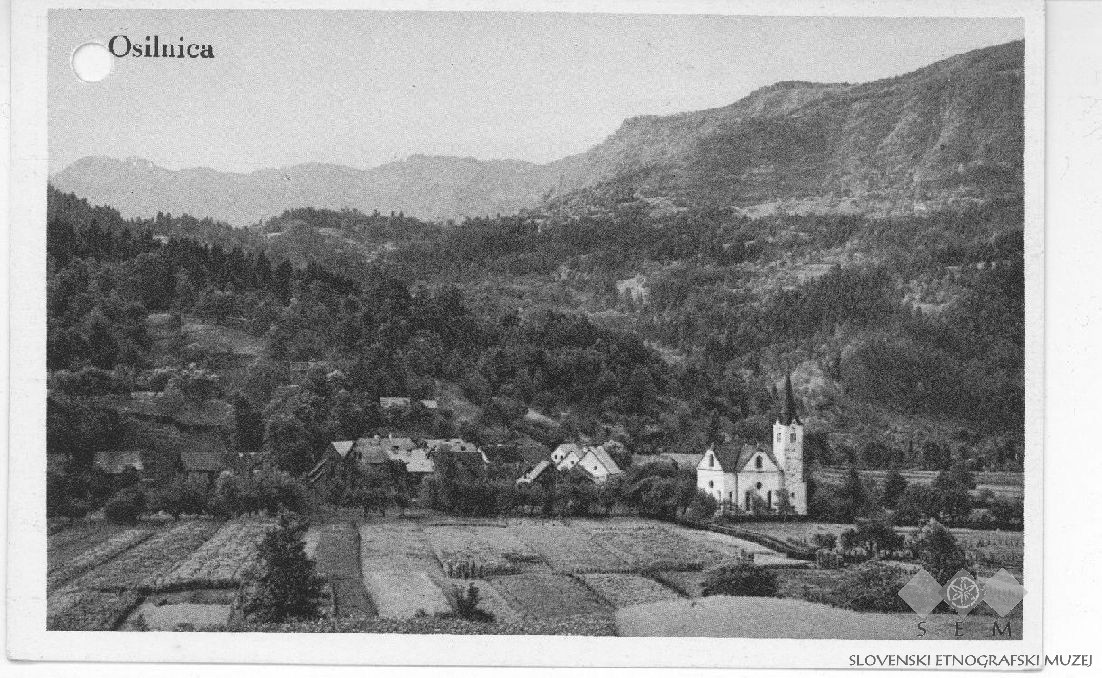
Postcard from c. 1928–1947

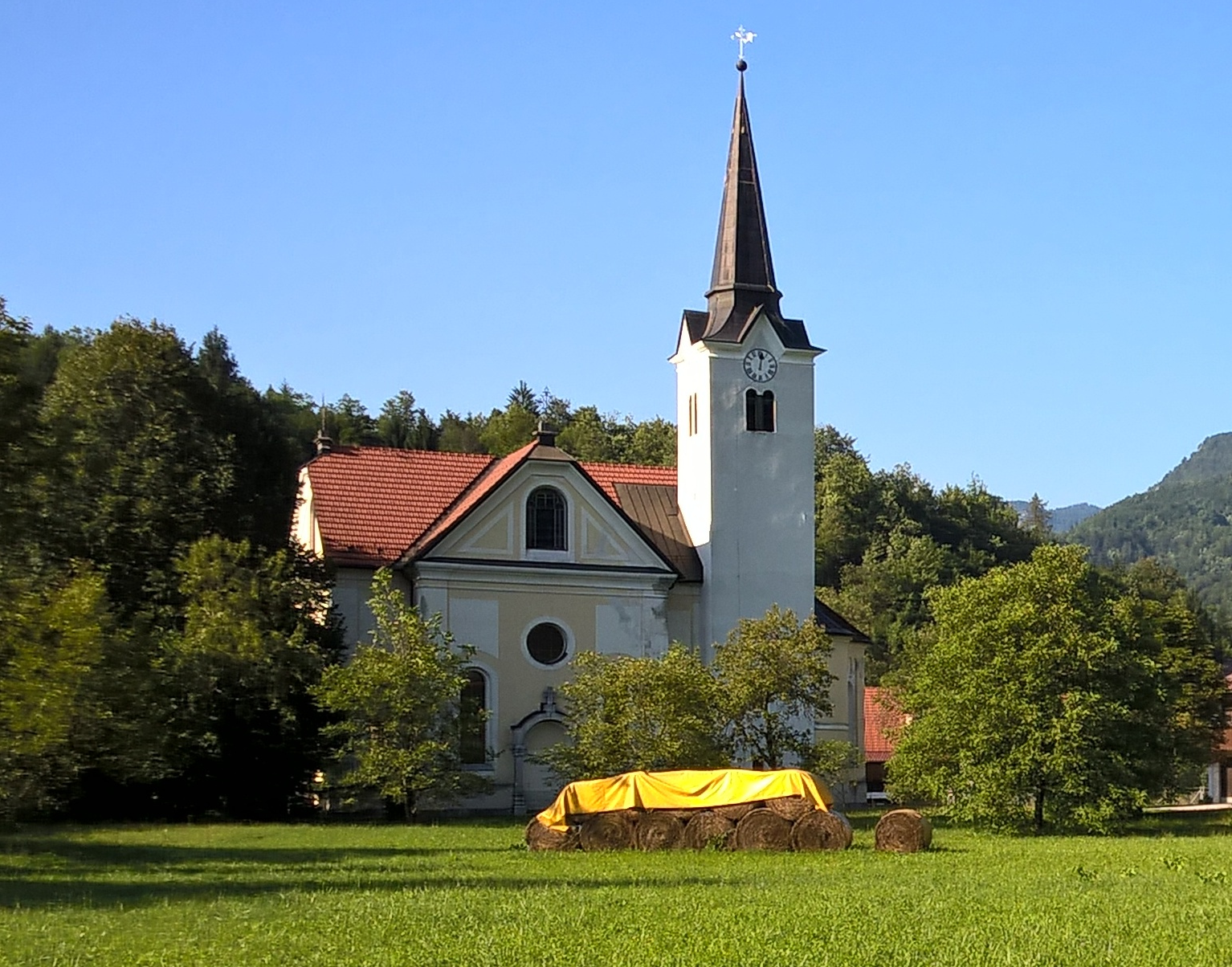
Saints Peter and Paul Church

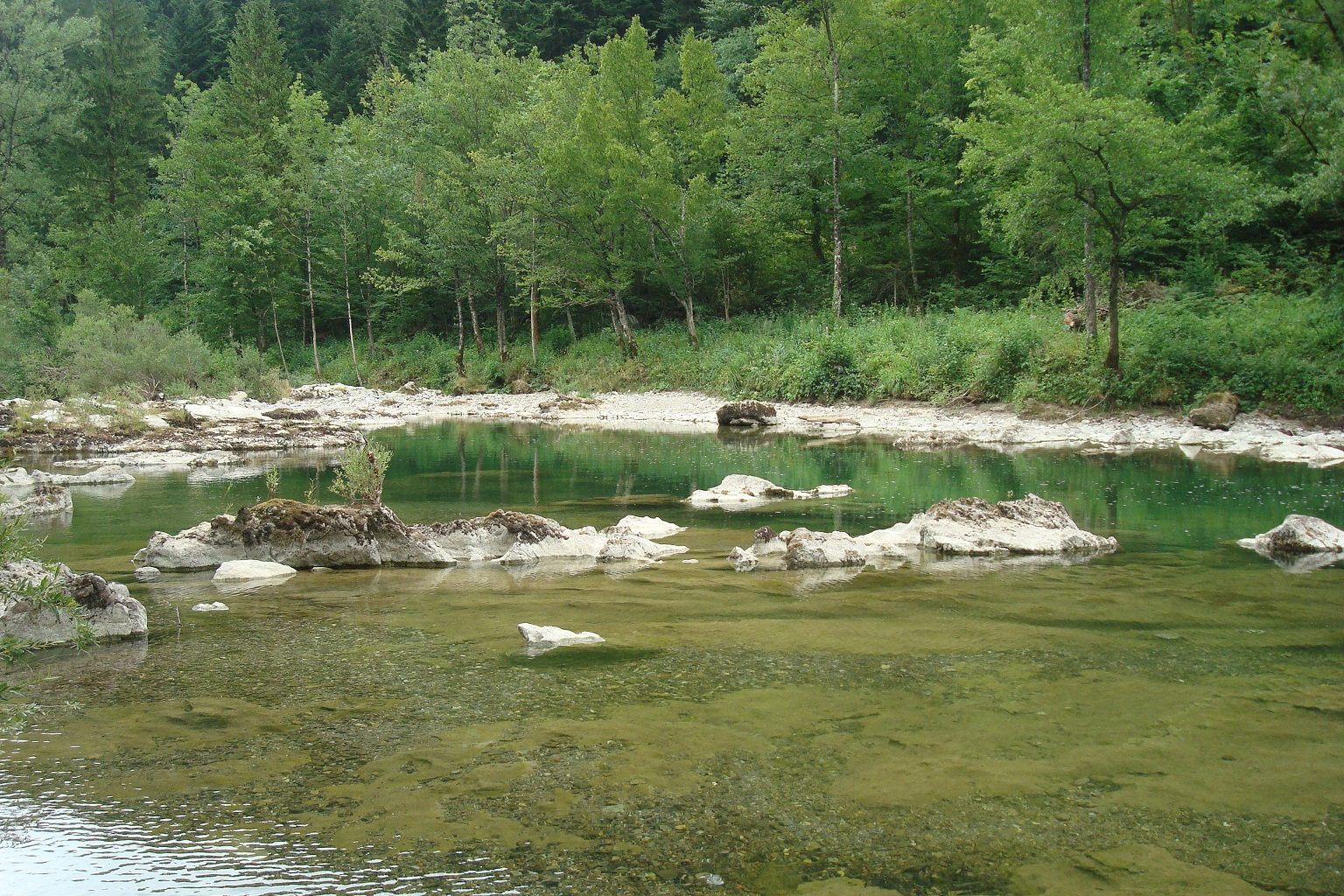
The Kolpa River near Osilnica
