= Žurge =

- Location in Slovenia
- Coordinates: 45°34′39.01″N 14°41′52.67″E
- Country: Slovenia
- Traditional region: Lower Carniola
- Statistical region: Southeast Slovenia
- Municipality: Osilnica

Area
  - Total: 6.65 km^{2} (2.57 sq mi)
- Elevation: 533.7 m (1,751 ft)

Population (2002)
  - Total: 7
- Postal code: 1337

Žurge (pronounced [ˈʒuːɾɡɛ]; German: Sürgern) is a small village in the Municipality of Osilnica in southern Slovenia. The area is part of the traditional region of Lower Carniola and is now included in the Southeast Slovenia Statistical Region.

The local church in the settlement is dedicated to the Holy Spirit and belongs to the Parish of Osilnica. It dates to the 17th century.
