= Strojiči =

- Location in Slovenia
- Coordinates: 45°32′41″N 14°41′21″E
- Country: Slovenia
- Traditional region: Lower Carniola
- Statistical region: Southeast Slovenia
- Municipality: Osilnica

Area
  - Total: 0.84 km^{2} (0.32 sq mi)
- Elevation: 326.4 m (1,071 ft)

Population (2002)
  - Total: 14
- Postal code: 1337

Strojiči (pronounced [ˈstɾoːjitʃi] or [stɾɔˈjiːtʃi]; in older sources also Strojč, German: Stroitsch) is a small settlement in the Municipality of Osilnica in southern Slovenia, right on the border with Croatia. The area is part of the traditional region of Lower Carniola and is now included in the Southeast Slovenia Statistical Region.
