= Podplanina =

- Location in Slovenia
- Coordinates: 45°35′58.54″N 14°39′3.81″E
- Country: Slovenia
- Traditional region: Lower Carniola
- Statistical region: Southeast Slovenia
- Municipality: Loški Potok

Area
  - Total: 2.31 km^{2} (0.89 sq mi)
- Elevation: 612.4 m (2,009 ft)

Population (2002)
  - Total: 31
- Postal code: 1319

Podplanina (pronounced [ˈpotːplanina]; in older sources also Planina, German: Alben, Gottschee German: Untrdaubə) is a small settlement in the Municipality of Loški Potok in southern Slovenia, next to the border with Croatia. The source of the Čabranka River lies just west of the village. The area is part of the traditional region of Lower Carniola and is now included in the Southeast Slovenia Statistical Region. It stands on terraces above the Čabranka River on steep slopes below Trava Peak (Slovene: Travljanski vrh). The settlement consists of a number of hamlets (Pri Kolarjih, Zdolenjci, Pri Kapelici, Hrib) and individual houses (Loka, Banija, Pri Kovačnici, Izvor/Obrh, Pri Drobniču). The core of the settlement is in the hamlet of Pri Kapelici.

== Name ==
The name Podplanina is derived from a prepositional phrase in which the noun has lost its case ending: pod 'below' + planina 'mountain pasture'. The name therefore means 'below the mountain pasture(s).' The semantics of the Gottschee German name Untrdaubə, derived from the name Unter der Alpe in the land registry of 1574, are identical. The standard German name, Alben, simply means 'mountain pastures', corresponding to the variant Slovene name Planina. The residents of Podplanina are referred to as Brežani by the people of the Kotar area.

== History ==
Podplanina was founded in the 16th century. The land registry of 1574 states that three farmers lived here, with two full farms and one three-quarters farm. Towards the mid-17th century Slovenes from the Bohinj area began settling the Čabar area. Before the Second World War the village had 30 houses and a population of 114; it had a majority Slovene and small Gottschee German population. In October 1943 German forces killed two Partisans in the village. While retreating, German and Četnik forces suffered losses at the hand of the Partisans in Podplanina on 29 April 1945.

== Notable people ==
Notable people that were born or lived in Podplanina include:

- Katica Lipovec (1900–?), folk poet
