= Mirtoviči =

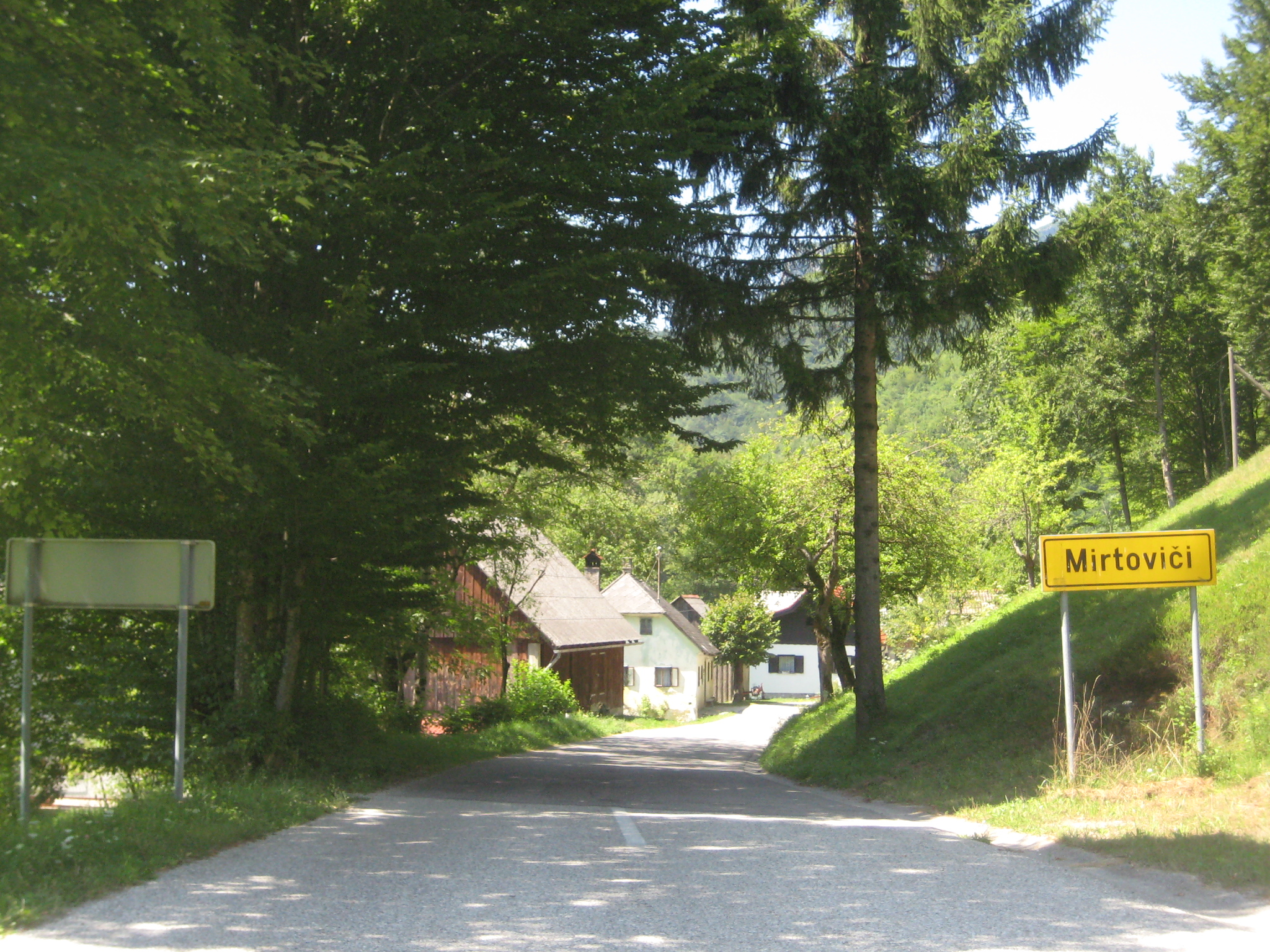

- Location in Slovenia
- Coordinates: 45°30′30.23″N 14°46′39.64″E
- Country: Slovenia
- Traditional region: Lower Carniola
- Statistical region: Southeast Slovenia
- Municipality: Osilnica

Area
  - Total: 2.59 km^{2} (1.00 sq mi)
- Elevation: 245.8 m (806 ft)

Population (2002)
  - Total: 11
- Postal code: 1337

Mirtoviči (pronounced [ˈmiːɾtɔʋitʃi]; in older sources also Mrtovec, German: Mertouz) is a small settlement on the left bank of the Kolpa River in the Municipality of Osilnica in southern Slovenia. The entire municipality is part of the traditional region of Lower Carniola and is now included in the Southeast Slovenia Statistical Region.

== Gallery ==
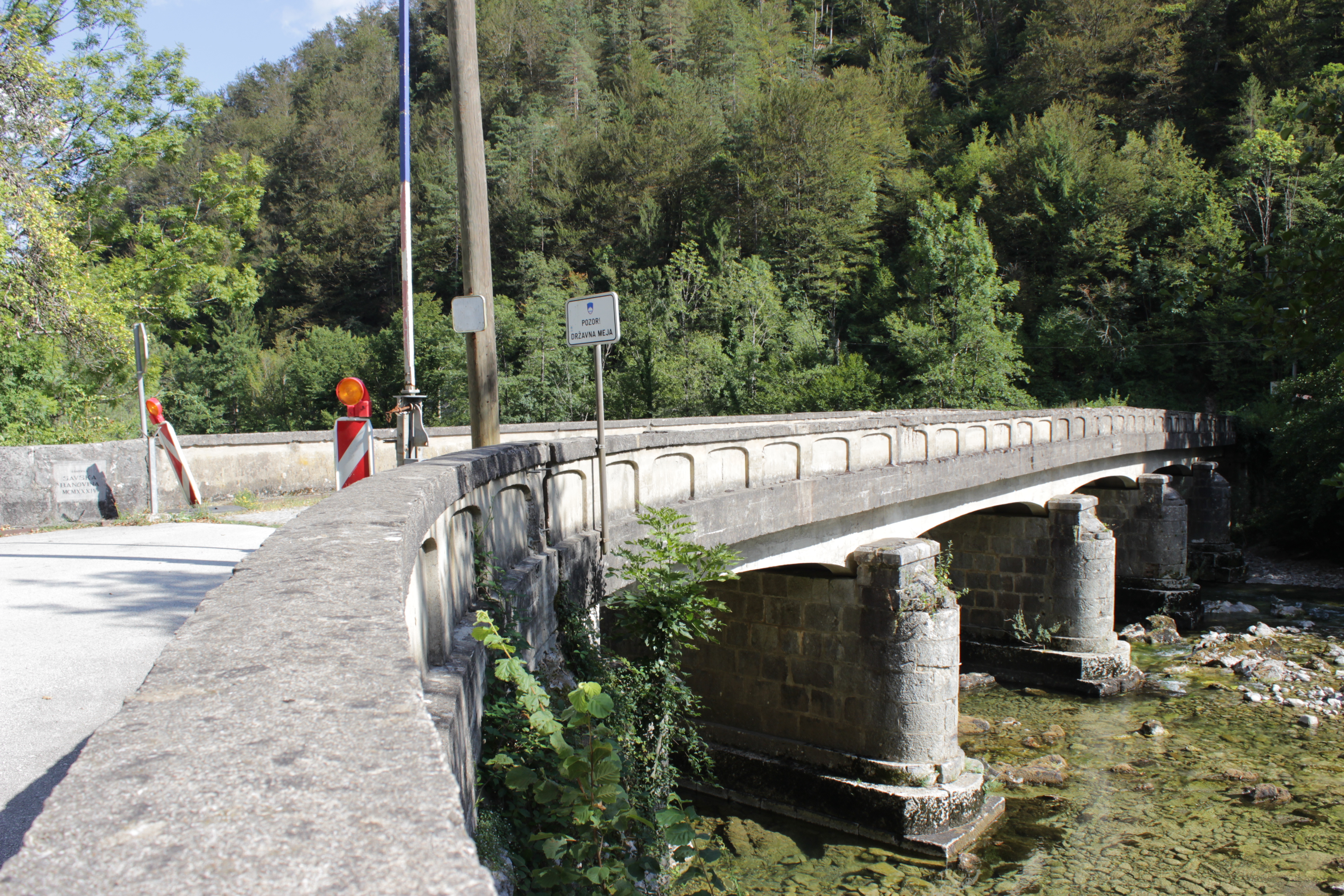
Bridge between Mirtoviči and Gašparci
