= Čabranka =

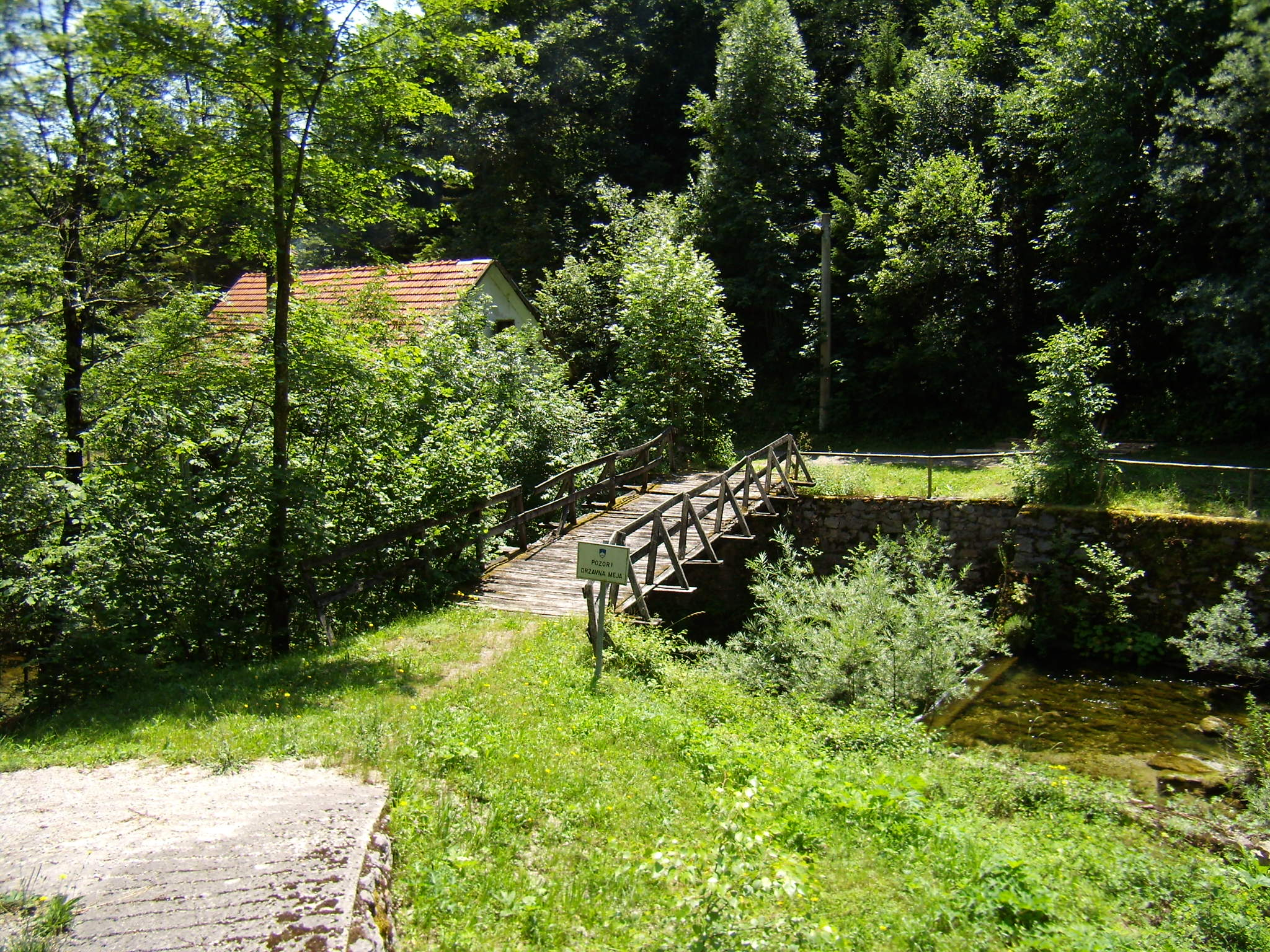
- A wooden footbridge over the Čabranka

Location
- Countries: Croatia; Slovenia

Physical characteristics
- Mouth
  - location: Kupa
  - coordinates: 45.5255°N 14.7003°E

Basin features
- Progression: Kupa→ Sava→ Danube→ Black Sea

The Čabranka is a small river on the border between Slovenia and Croatia. It is 17.5 kilometres (10.9 mi) long and is a left tributary of the Kupa River (Croatian: Kupa, Slovene: Kolpa). Its source is just west of the settlement of Podplanina in the Municipality of Loški Potok in southern Slovenia and just north of the Croatian village of Čabar, from which it gets its name. It joins the Kupa at Osilnica.
