= Papeži =

- Village
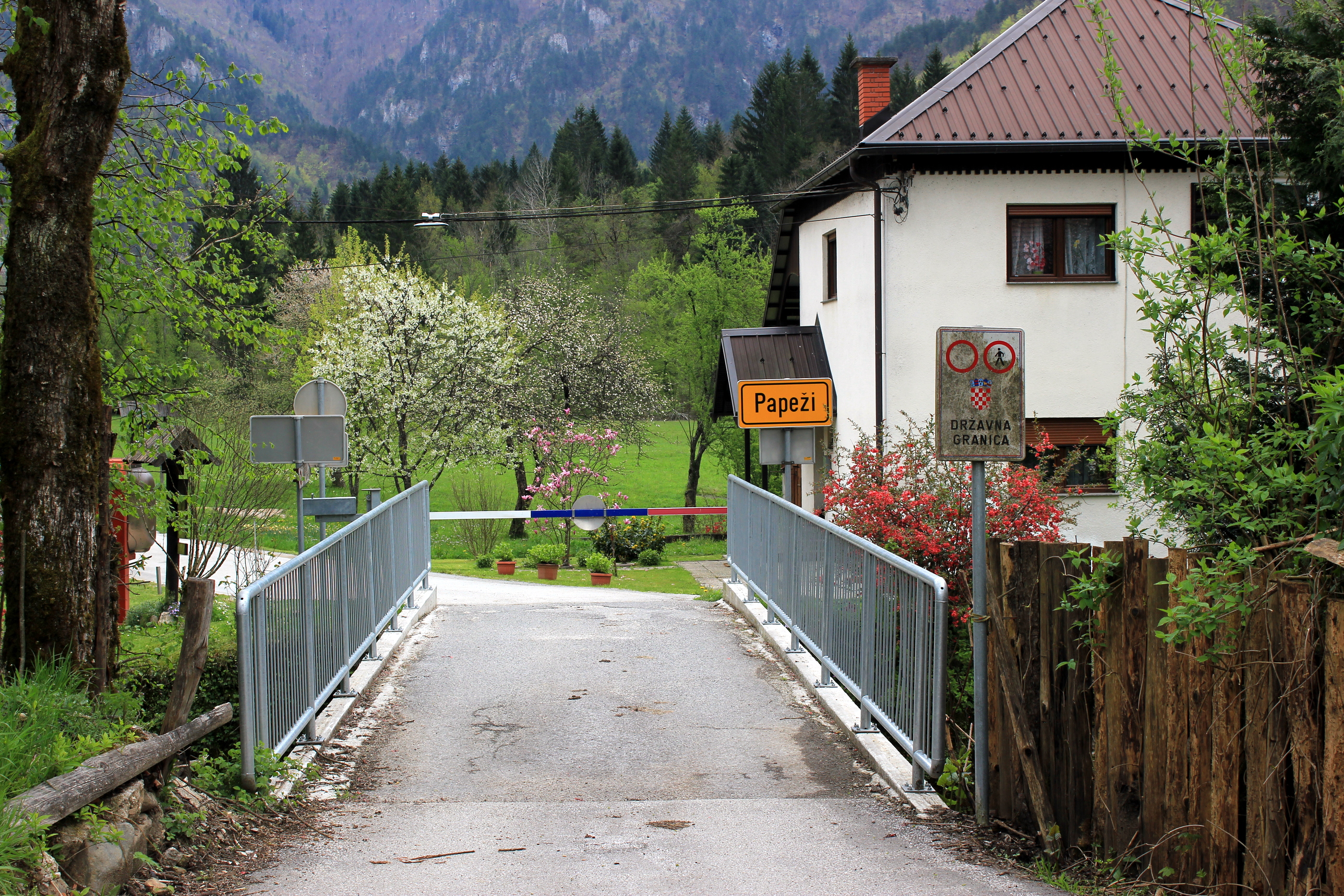

- Location in Slovenia
- Coordinates: 45°34′0.16″N 14°42′2.1″E
- Country: Slovenia
- Traditional region: Lower Carniola
- Statistical region: Southeast Slovenia
- Municipality: Osilnica

Area
  - Total: 0.27 km^{2} (0.10 sq mi)
- Elevation: 366.1 m (1,201 ft)

Population (2002)
  - Total: 16
- Postal code: 1337

Papeži (pronounced [ˈpaːpɛʒi]; German: Papesch) is a small village in the Municipality of Osilnica in southern Slovenia. The area is part of the traditional region of Lower Carniola and is now included in the Southeast Slovenia Statistical Region.

The local church in the settlement is dedicated to Saint Michael and belongs to the parish of Osilnica. It dates to the 18th century.
