= Belica, Osilnica =

Belica
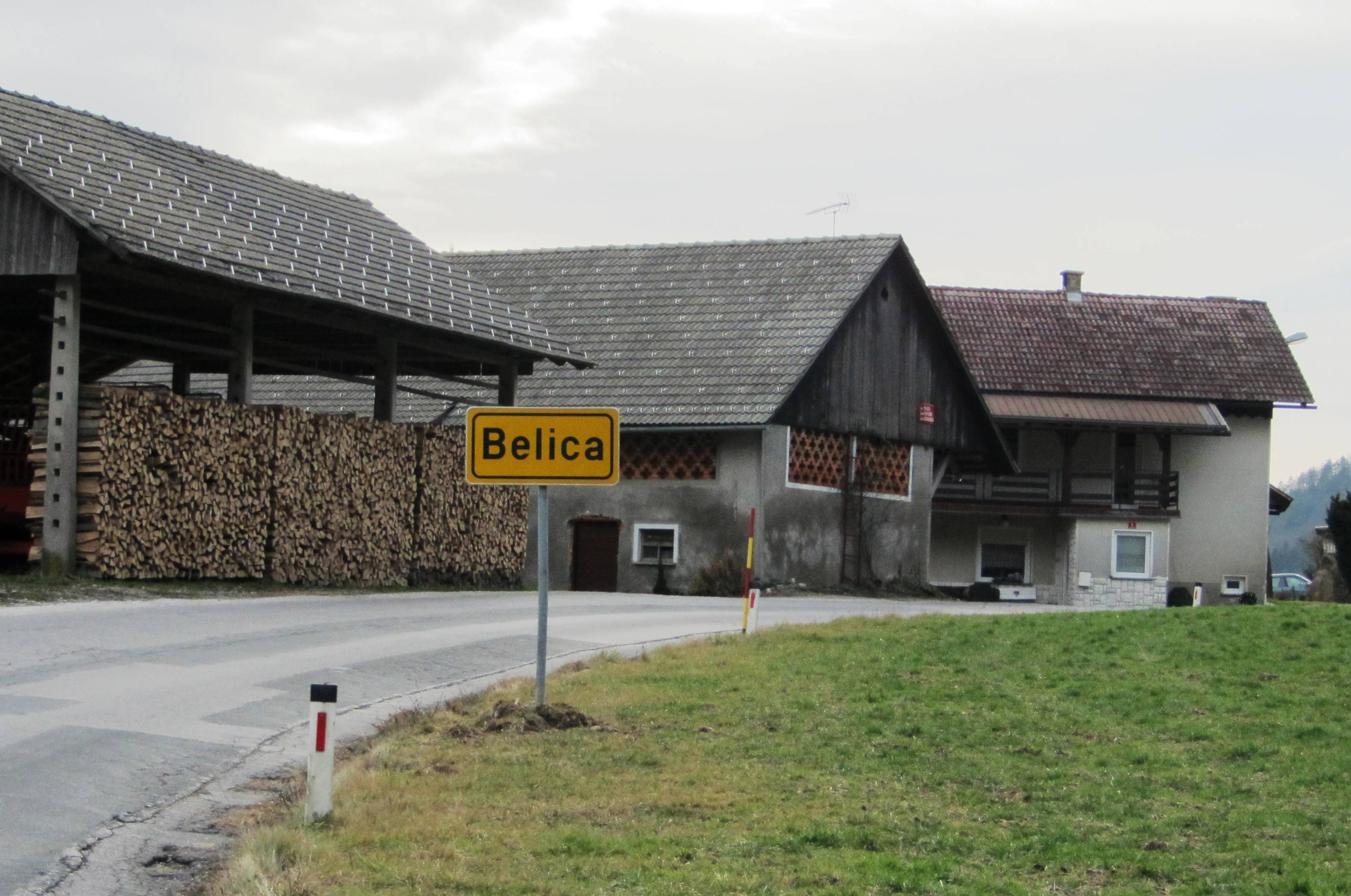

- Location in Slovenia
- Coordinates: 45°34′5.42″N 14°42′31.13″E
- Country: Slovenia
- Traditional region: Lower Carniola
- Statistical region: Southeast Slovenia
- Municipality: Osilnica

Area
  - Total: 1.91 km^{2} (0.74 sq mi)
- Elevation: 377.1 m (1,237 ft)

Population (2002)
  - Total: 7
- Postal code: 1337

Belica (pronounced [ˈbeːlitsa]; German: Weißenbach) is a small settlement in the Municipality of Osilnica in southern Slovenia. The area is part of the traditional region of Lower Carniola and is now included in the Southeast Slovenia Statistical Region.

== Name ==
Belica was attested in historical documents as Weissembach and Weissennbach in 1498.

== Cultural heritage ==
There is a small chapel-shrine in the settlement dedicated to the Virgin Mary. It dates to the second half of the 19th century.
