= Bezgovica, Osilnica =

Bezgovica
- Location in Slovenia
- Coordinates: 45°32′59.98″N 14°42′28.7″E
- Country: Slovenia
- Traditional region: Lower Carniola
- Statistical region: Southeast Slovenia
- Municipality: Osilnica

Area
  - Total: 3.46 km^{2} (1.34 sq mi)
- Elevation: 565.4 m (1,855 ft)

Population (2002)
  - Total: 12
- Postal code: 1337

Bezgovica (pronounced [bəzɡɔˈʋiːtsa]; German: Wesgowitz) is a small settlement in the Municipality of Osilnica in southern Slovenia. The area is part of the traditional region of Lower Carniola and is now included in the Southeast Slovenia Statistical Region.

== Name ==
Bezgovica was attested in written records as Bosgawitz in 1498.

== Cultural heritage ==
There is a small chapel-shrine at the crossroads south of the settlement dedicated to the Virgin Mary. It dates to the early 20th century.
