= Municipality of Osilnica =

Municipality of Slovenia

Municipality of Osilnica Občina Osilnica
- Municipality
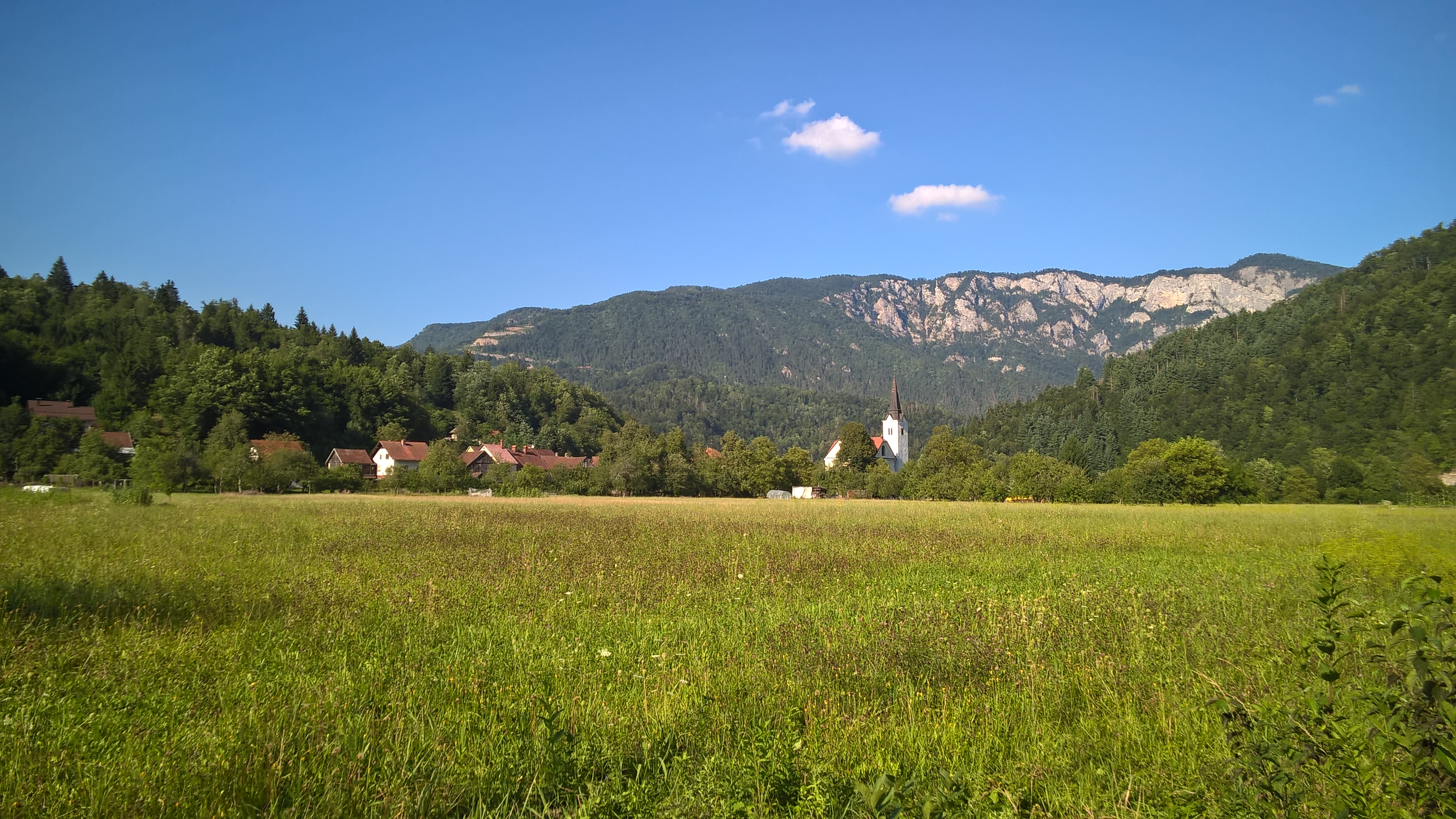

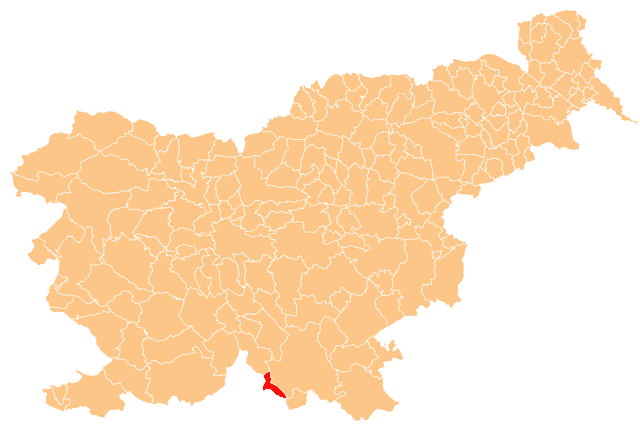
- Location of the Municipality of Osilnica in Slovenia
- Coordinates: 45°31′44″N 14°41′53″E
- Country: Slovenia

Government
  - Mayor: Alenka Kovač (Independent)

Area
  - Total: 36.2 km^{2} (14.0 sq mi)

Population (2002)
  - Total: 332
  - Density: 9.17/km^{2} (23.8/sq mi)
- Time zone: UTC+01 (CET)
  - Summer (DST): UTC+02 (CEST)
- Website: www.osilnica.si

The Municipality of Osilnica (pronounced [ɔˈsiːu̯nitsa]; Slovene: Občina Osilnica) is a municipality in southern Slovenia. It gets its name from the largest settlement and seat of the municipality, Osilnica. It borders Croatia.

== Settlements ==
In addition to the municipal seat of Osilnica, the municipality also includes the following settlements:

- Belica
- Bezgarji
- Bezgovica
- Bosljiva Loka
- Grintovec pri Osilnici
- Križmani
- Ložec
- Malinišče
- Mirtoviči
- Padovo pri Osilnici
- Papeži
- Podvrh
- Ribjek
- Sela
- Spodnji Čačič
- Strojiči
- Zgornji Čačič
- Žurge
