= Kupa =

River in central Europe; part of the Croatian-Slovenian border

Kupa / Kolpa
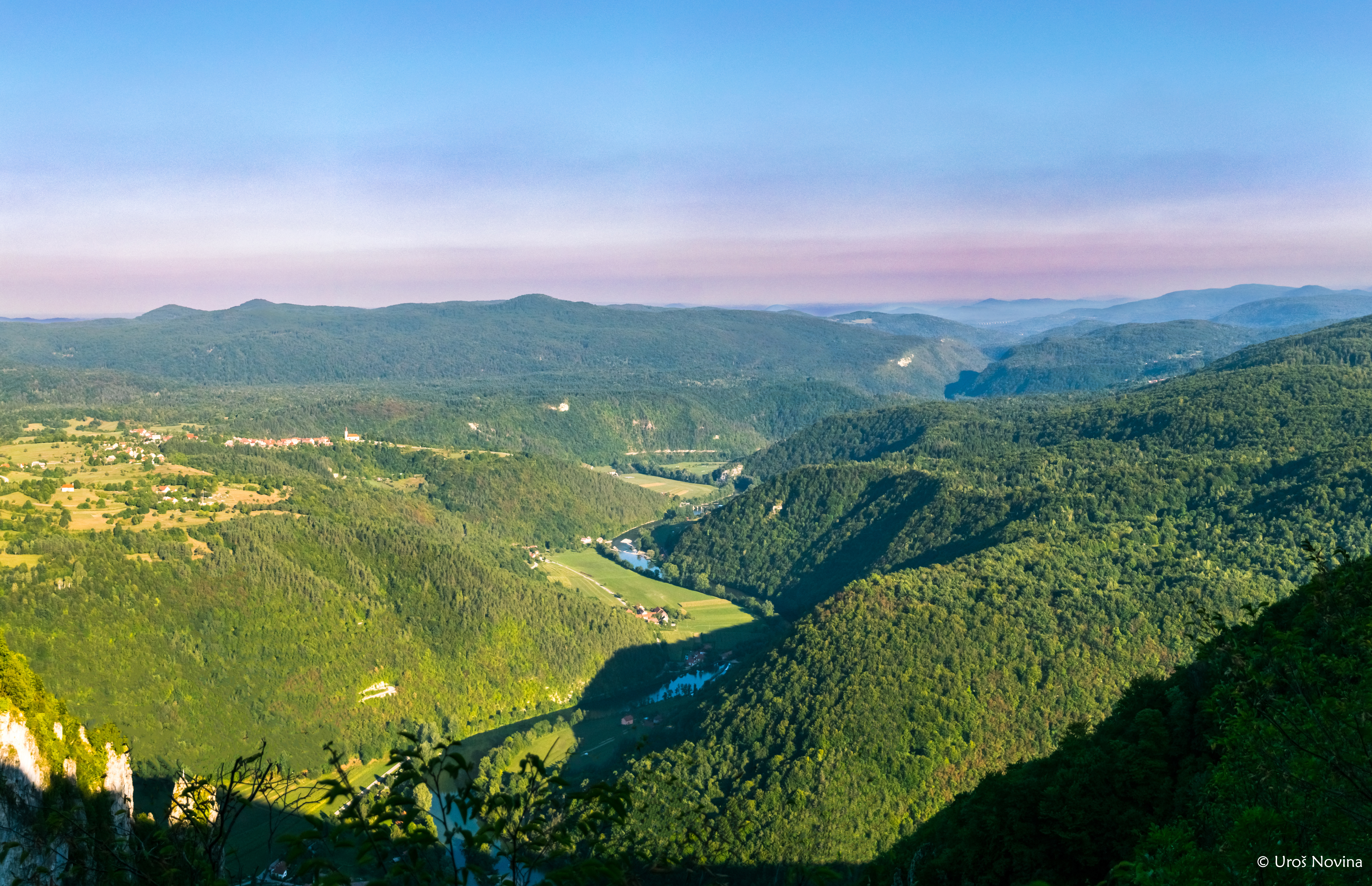
- River valley from Kozice

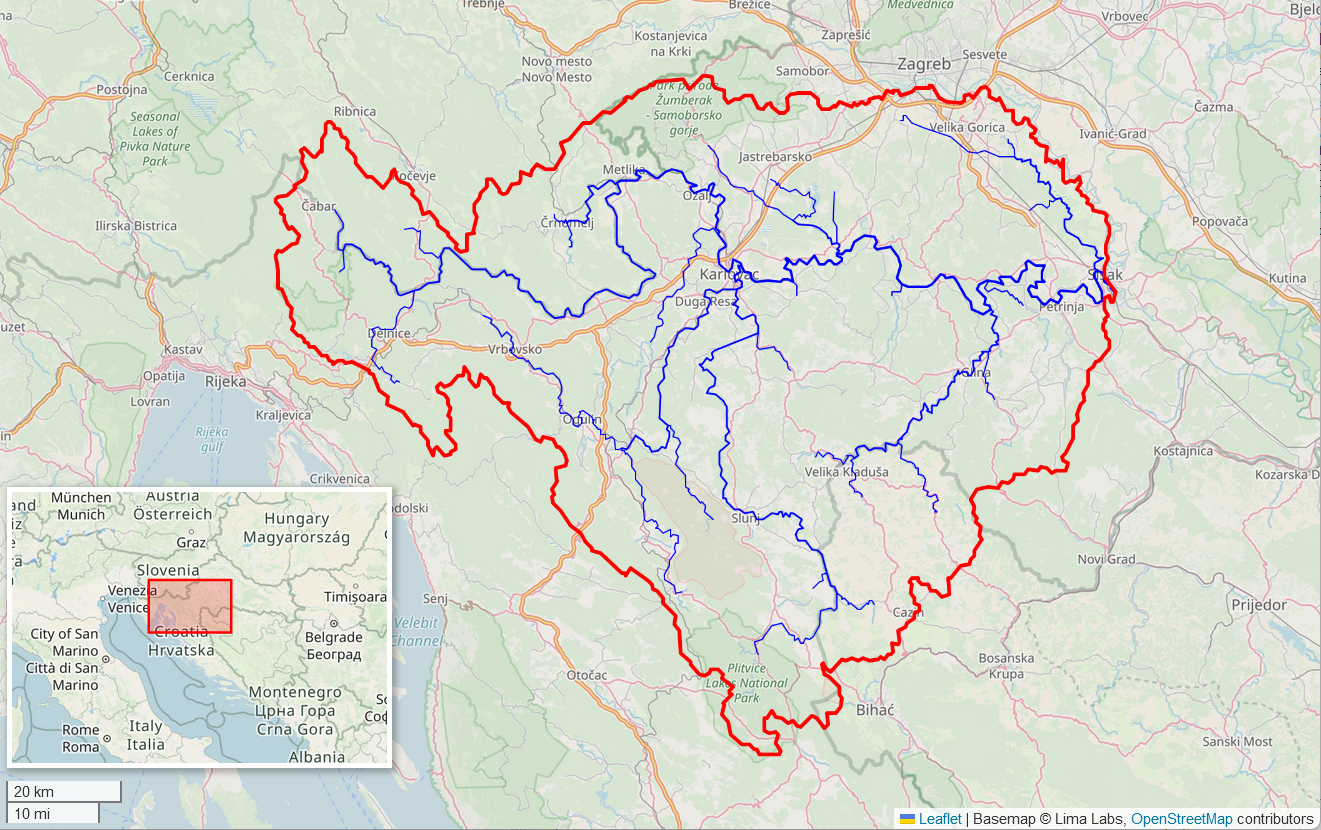
- Kupa River watershed (interactive map)

Location
- Countries: Croatia; Slovenia

Physical characteristics
- Source
  - location: Razloge, Gorski kotar, Croatia
  - coordinates: 45.491°N 14.689°E
  - elevation: 313 metres (1,027 ft)
- Mouth
  - location: Sava, Sisak, Croatia
  - coordinates: 45°27′36″N 16°24′08″E
- Length: 297.4 km (184.8 mi)
- Basin size: 10,226 km^{2} (3,948 sq mi)
- Discharge
  - average: 283 m^{3}/s (10,000 cu ft/s)

Basin features
- Progression: Sava→ Danube→ Black Sea

The Kupa (Croatian pronunciation: [kûpa]) or Kolpa (Slovene pronunciation: [ˈkóːlpa] or [ˈkóːwpa]; from Latin: Colapis in Roman times; Hungarian: Kulpa) river, a right tributary of the Sava, forms a natural border between north-west Croatia and southeast Slovenia. It is 297 kilometres (185 miles) long, with a length of 118 km (73 mi) serving as the border between Croatia and Slovenia and the rest located in Croatia.

== Etymology ==
The name Colapis, recorded in antiquity, is presumed to have come from the Proto-Indo-European roots *quel- 'turn, meander' and *ap- 'water', meaning 'meandering water'. An alternative interpretation is *(s)kel-/*skul- 'shiny, bright', meaning 'clear river'.

== Course ==
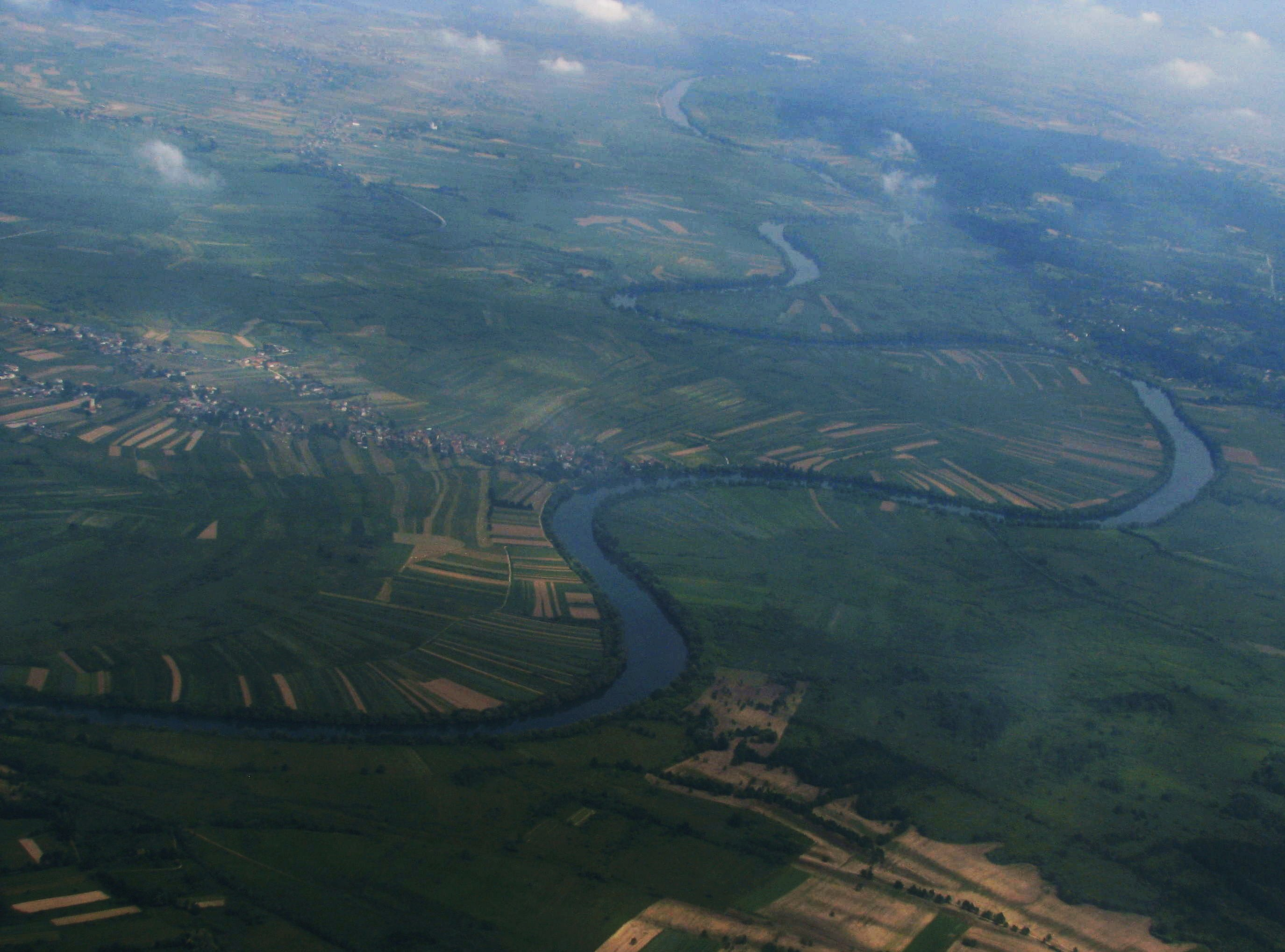
In its lower course, the Kupa meanders through the plains of the Pannonian Basin.

The Kupa originates in Croatia in the mountainous region of Gorski Kotar, northeast of Rijeka, in the area of Risnjak National Park. It flows a few kilometers eastwards, receives the small Čabranka River from the left, from which point it forms the Slovenian border.

It then continues eastwards between the White Carniola region in the north and Central Croatia in the south. The Kupa receives influx from the river Lahinja from the left in Primostek, passes Vrbovsko, and eventually detaches from the Slovenian border having passed Metlika.

It then reaches the city of Karlovac, where it receives influx from two other rivers from the right, the Dobra and Korana (which in turn is joined by the Mrežnica). The Kupa continues flowing to the east, where it merges with the Glina from the right. It then passes through two small towns called Šišinec and Brkiševina, and then proceeds to the town of Sisak where it merges with the Odra from the left and, after passing through Sisak town centre, flows into the Sava.

== Pollution ==
Fairly unpolluted downstream to Karlovac, the upper Kupa is a popular place for bathing in summer. The section from Stari Trg down to Fučkovci since 2006 is part of the Slovenian Krajinski park Kolpa nature reserve.

The hydrological parameters of the Kupa are regularly monitored at Radenci, Kamanje, Karlovac, Jamnička Kiselica and Farkašić.

== History ==
In 1899, the notary of Brod, M. Pavelić, set out to excavate an easier path down to the source of the Kupa.

== Gallery ==
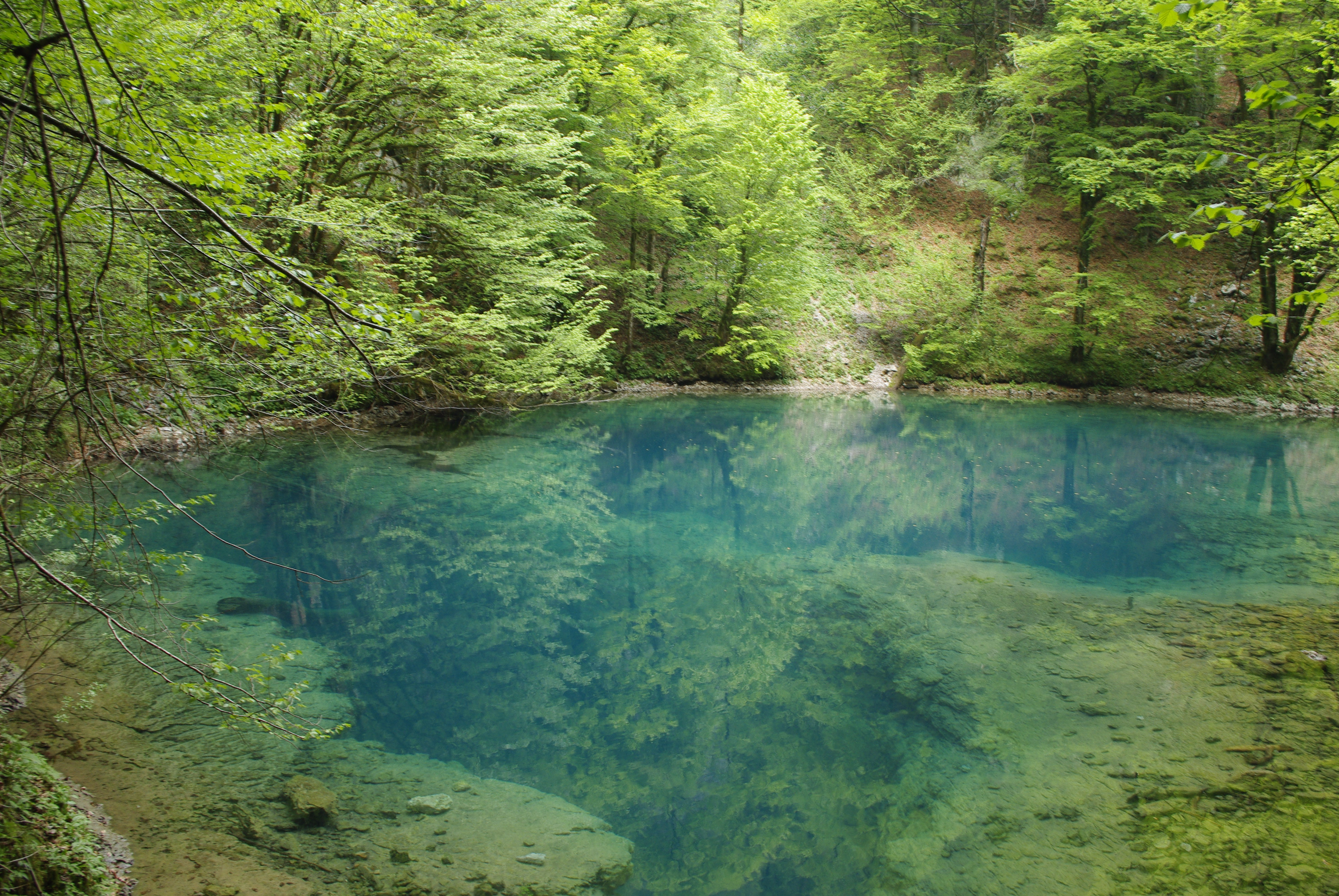
Main spring.

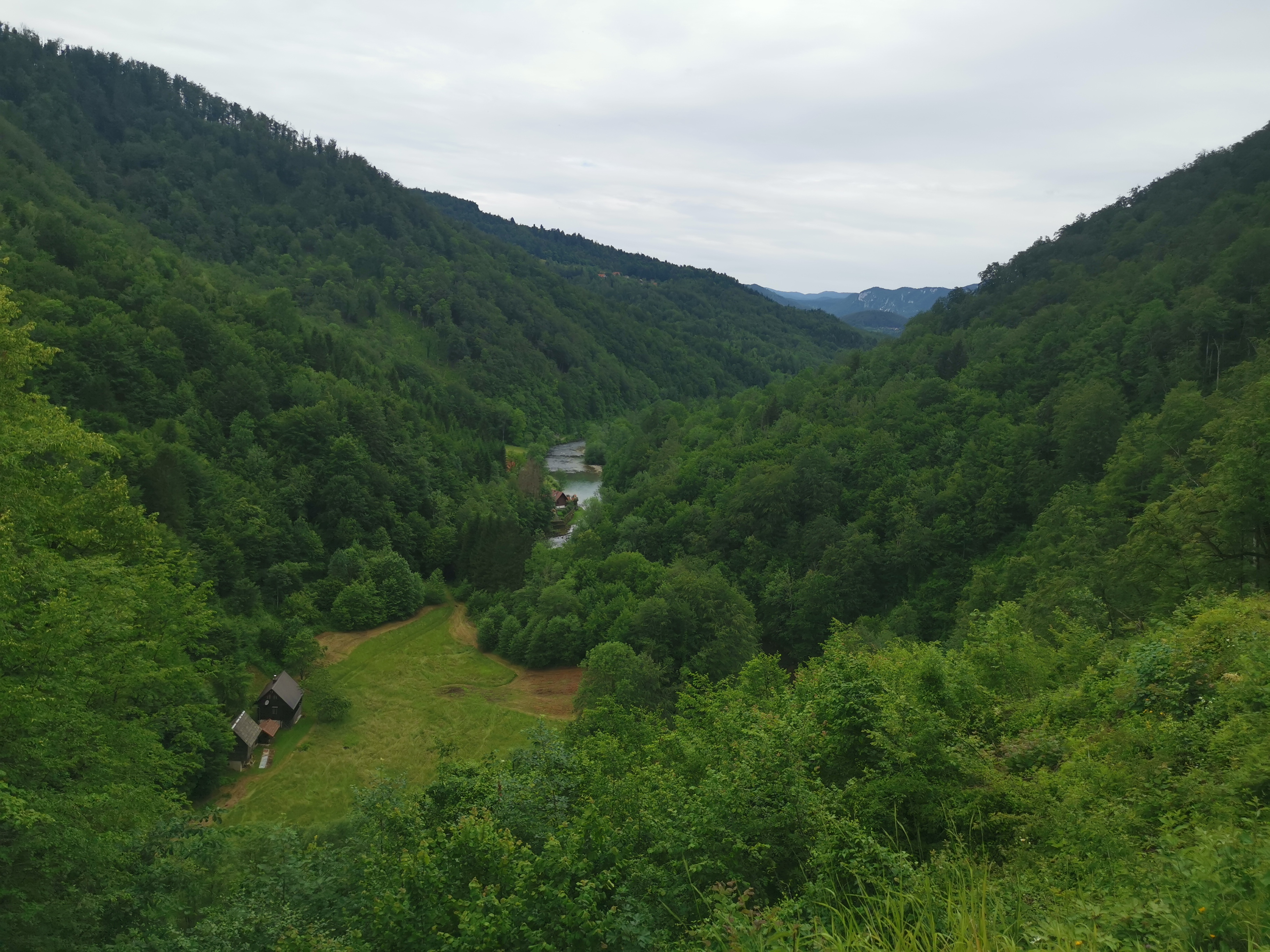
Source canyon.

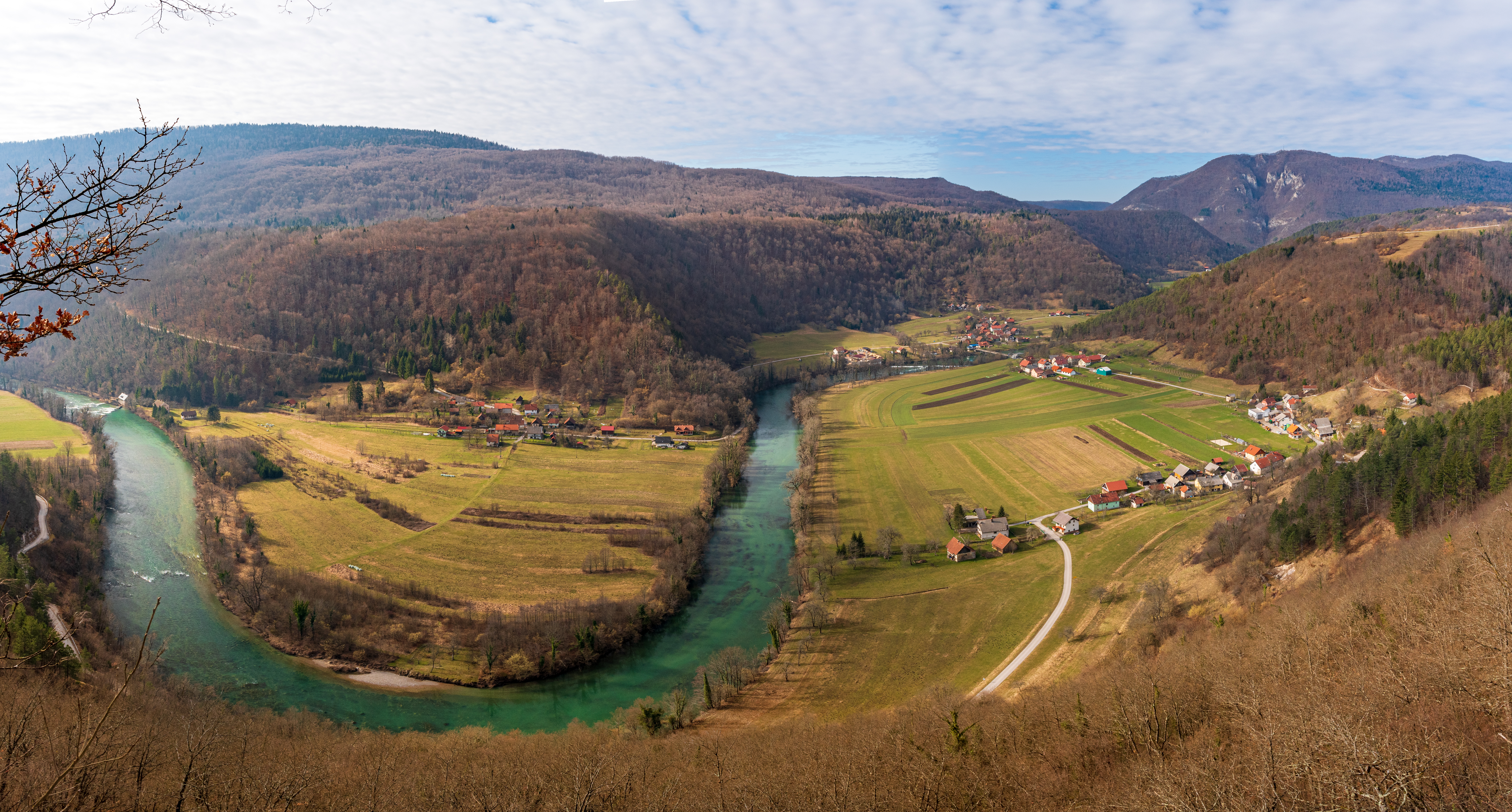
From Sodevska stena.

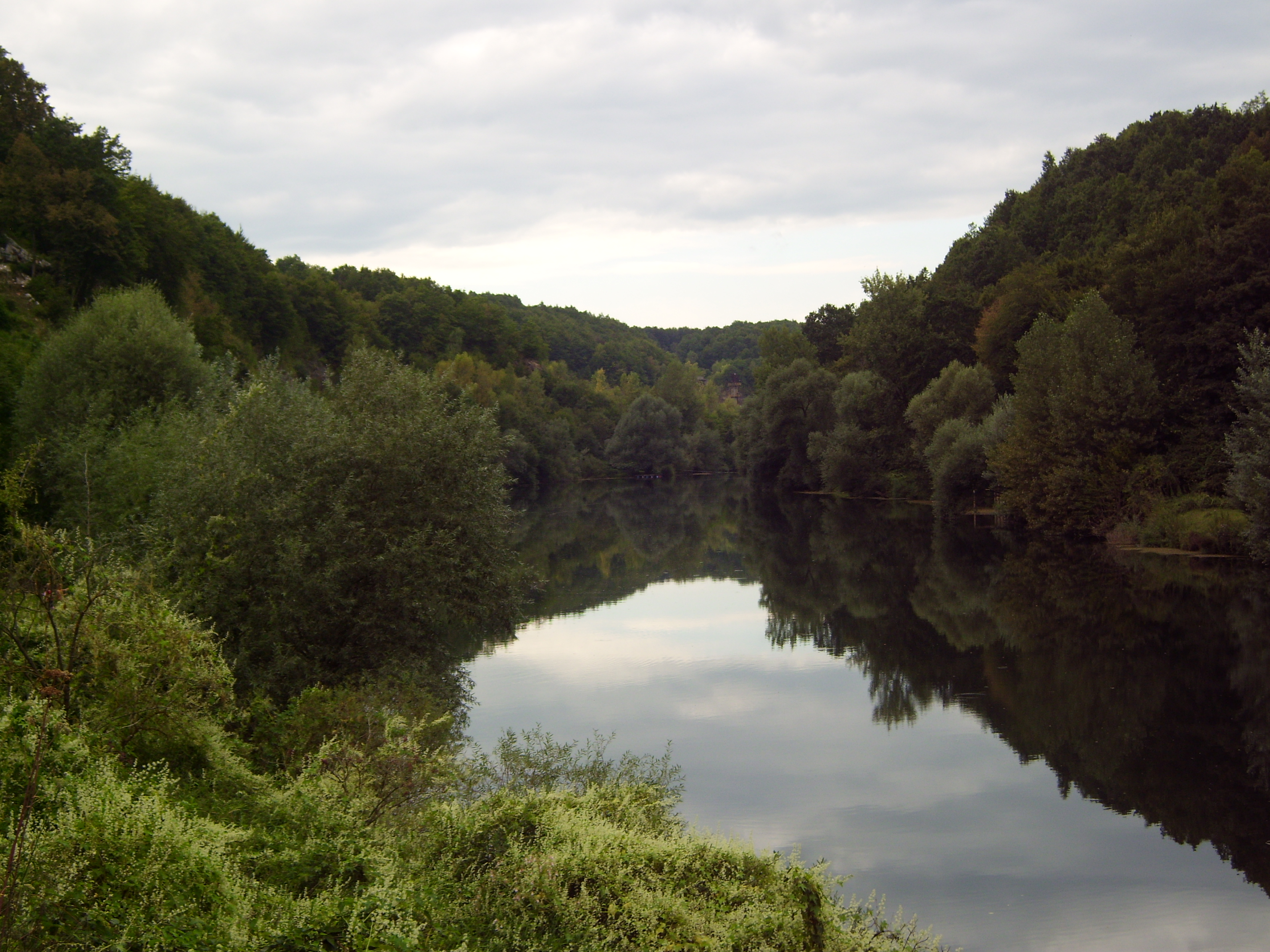
At Ozalj.

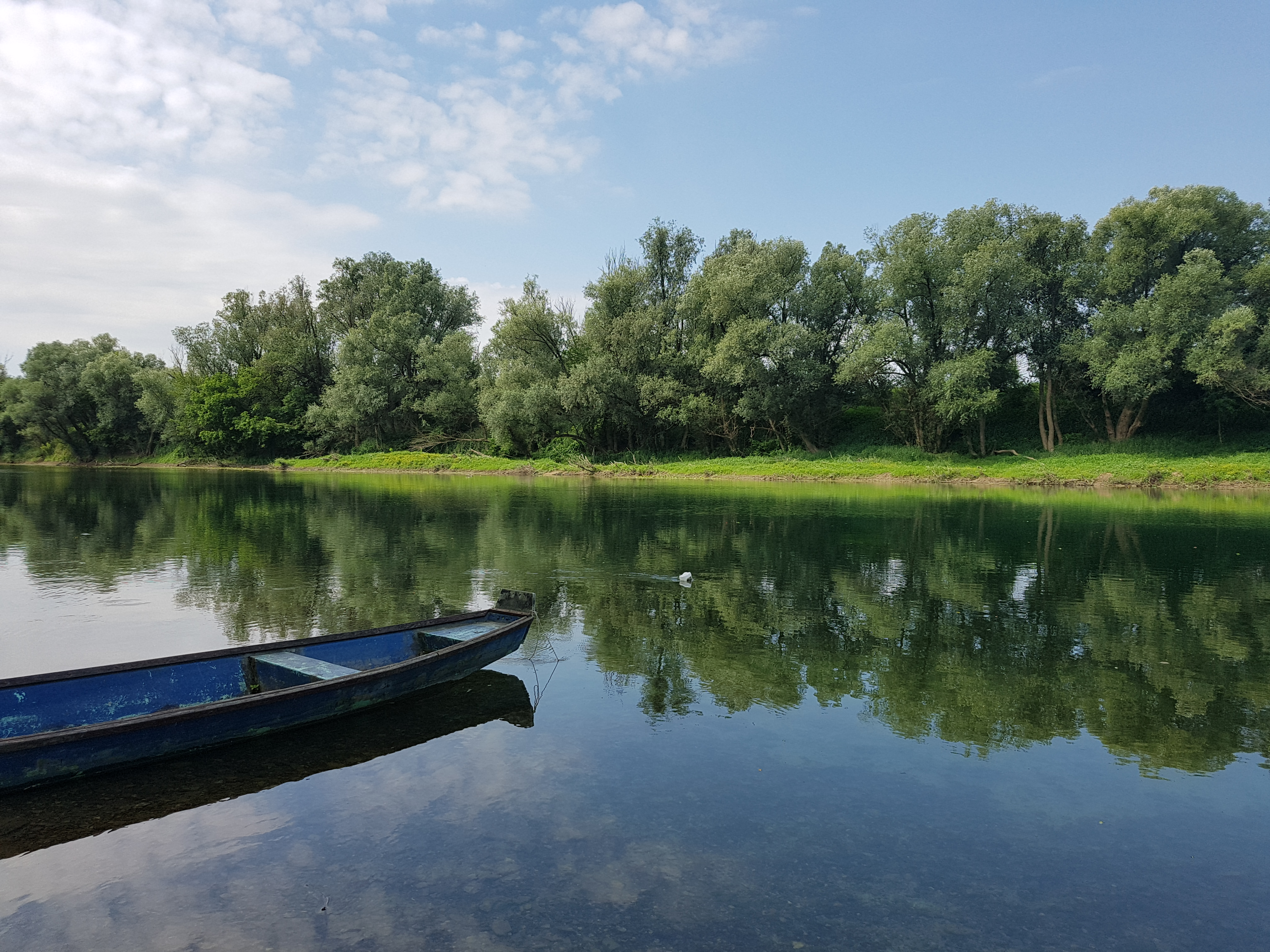
In Šišinec.

== See also ==
- Slovenian border barrier

== Sources ==
- Šimunović, Petar (March 2013). "Predantički toponimi u današnjoj (i povijesnoj) Hrvatskoj" [Pre-Roman placenames in present-day (and historical) Croatia] (PDF). Folia onomastica Croatica (in Croatian) (22). Zagreb: Croatian Academy of Sciences and Arts: 147–214.
