= Delnice =

- Town
- Grad Delnice; Town of Delnice
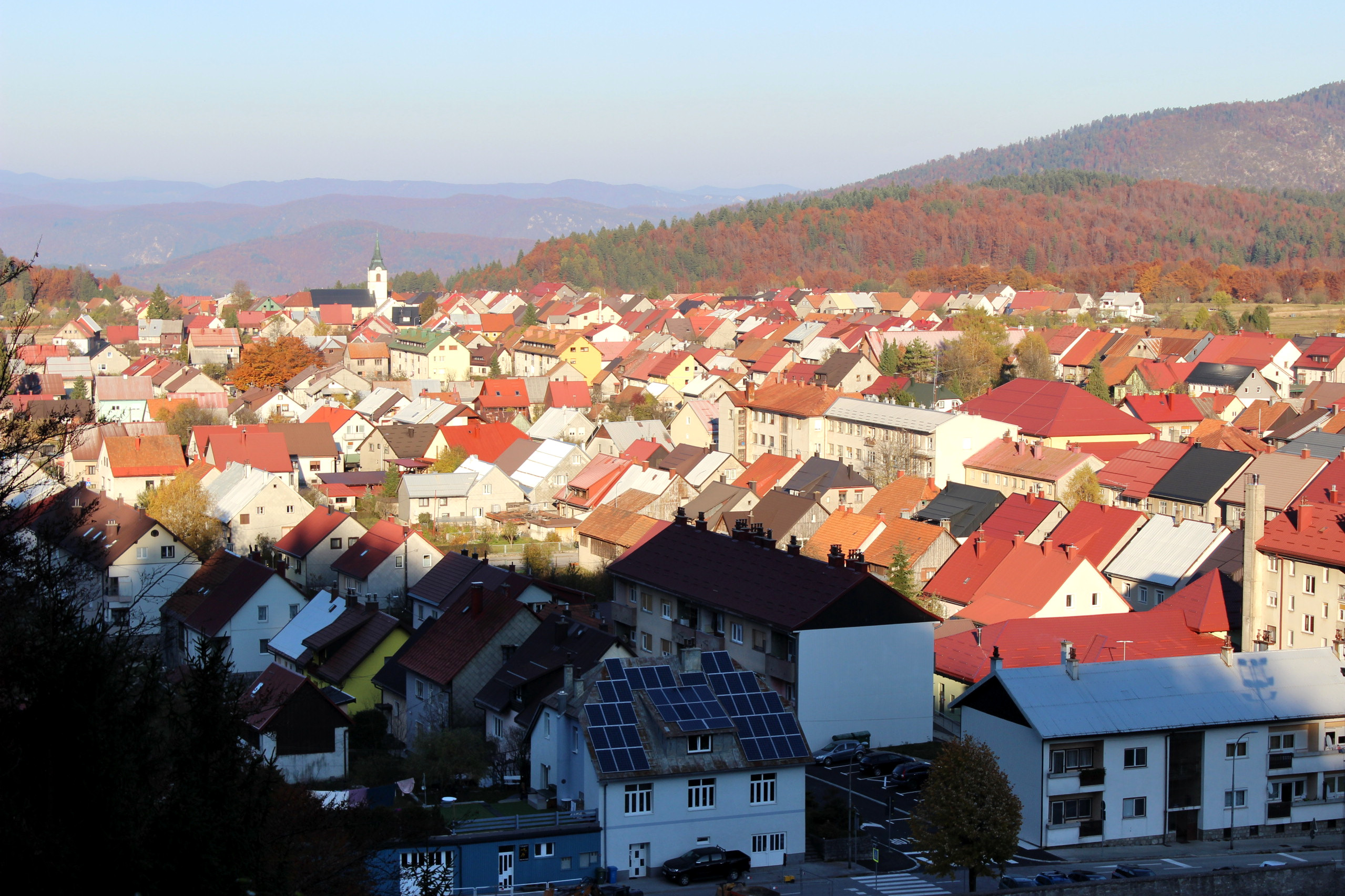
- Delnice town center
- Interactive map of Delnice
- Location of Delnice in Croatia
- Coordinates: 45.401°N 14.800°E
- Country: Croatia
- Region: Mountainous Croatia (Gorski Kotar)
- County: Primorje-Gorski Kotar County

Government
  - Mayor: Katarina Mihelčić (Ind.)

Area
  - Town: 230.9 km^{2} (89.2 sq mi)
  - Urban: 24.4 km^{2} (9.4 sq mi)

Population (2021)
  - Town: 5,135
  - Density: 22.24/km^{2} (57.60/sq mi)
  - Urban: 3,861
  - Urban density: 158/km^{2} (410/sq mi)
- Time zone: UTC+1 (Central European Time)
- Vehicle registration: DE
- Website: delnice.hr

Delnice (pronounced [děːlnit͡se̞]) is a town in western Croatia, the largest settlement in the mountainous region of Gorski Kotar, in the Primorje-Gorski Kotar County. The town has a population of 3861, and total municipality population is 5135 (2021). Delnice is Gorski Kotar's main town.

== History ==
The first mention of Delnice was "Stjepan Kalmin iz Delnica" in the 1436–1461 Liber Civilium of Rijeka.

One of the first mentions of Delnice was on 22 February 1481 in a document freeing the citizens of Grič from tariffs in Delnice and elsewhere.

The town was first mentioned in a 1482 document issued by Sabor, the Croatian Parliament.

After the Lujzijana was built, the Družtvo lujzinske ceste constructed an inn in Delnice. In 1874, the society would sell all its assets along the road, including those in Delnice.

On 21 February 1852 by a decree of the Ban of Croatia and Slavonia, Josip Jelačić, a Chamber of Commerce and Industry (Croatian: Trgovačko-obrtna komora) was to be founded in Rijeka with jurisdiction over Delnice. It was founded, and began to function on the 11th of March that year.

In 1860–1879, Matija Mažuranić wrote a 62 folio manuscript today titled Writings on the Building of Roads in Gorski Kotar and Lika (Croatian: Spisi o gradnji cesta u Gorskom Kotaru i Lici), today with signature HR-ZaNSK R 6424. A 21 folio manuscript dated 1872 titled Darstellung der Entstehung des Baues ... der Luisenstrasse togethr with a translation by I. Mikloušić is kept as HR-ZaNSK R 4572.

In the late 19th and early 20th centuries, Delnice was a district capital in the Modruš-Rijeka County of the Kingdom of Croatia-Slavonia.

The volunteer fire department DVD Delnice was founded in 1875. The Javna vatrogasna postrojba Grada Delnice was founded on 9 December 1999. Today, both are part of the Požarno područje Gorski Kotar I.

Past commanders of the VZ Denice and JVP Grada Delnice: (Note: PVJ Grada Delnice until 1993)

1. Livio Andlar (2005–2009)
2. Dražen Rački

Past commanders of the DVD Delnice:

1. Livio Andlar (1988–)
2. Dražen Rački

In 1898, the local chapter of the HPS was founded.

=== Kingdom of Yugoslavia ===
Since the inclusion of Ski jumping at the 1924 Winter Olympics, the sport grew in popularity. In 1934, a ski jump was opened below Skradski Vrh for jumps up to 28 metres (92 ft), the first on the territory of the ZZSP. Not to be outdone by Skrad, in 1935, the Klimatsko povjerenstvo of Delnice commissioned its own ski jump, designed by engineer Šafar, for jumps up to 40 metres (130 ft). The ski jump was initially handed over to the Športski Klub Delnice, but when they discontinued their winter section in 1935, it was transferred to the PD "Risnjak".

The winter of 1931–1932 was particularly harsh in Čabar and surrounding areas. The lack of livestock feed caused a sharp decrease in livestock price. In the spring, a lack of supplies threatened to collapse the resale and even financial sectors locally. On 30 April 20, the emergency Law on the Protection of Farmers (Croatian: Zakon o zaštiti zemljoradnika) came into force, which prevented forcible sale of farmland until 20 October.

The local chapter of the HPS is HPD "Risnjak", which had 56 members in 1936 under the Vilim Tausani presidency. At the time, it had a ski section, which fused with the ski section of Deška. Membership rose to 62 in 1937. It fell to 38 in 1938. It rose to 70 in 1939, of which 55 in the ski section.

A 22 December 1939 decision as part of agrarian reforms by Ban Šubašić to confiscate the forest property in Delnice and surroundings of the Thurn and Taxis family, Kálmán Ghyczy and Nikola Petrović resulted in a legal dispute known as the Thurn and Taxis Affair, in part because of the relative status of the family and in part because of the proximity to the Italian border.

=== WWII ===
See also Battle of Delnice

Delnice was the most prominent centre of resistance to occupation in western Gorski Kotar during WWII. During WWII, 601 people were killed in the kotar of Delnice, of which 555 by Italians, 28 by Germans, 11 by Serbs and 7 by Croats.

==== 1941 ====
On 11 April 1941 at around 18:00, a small Wehrmacht column reached Delnice, but apart from one Hitler supporter, one local electritian and two or three county officials, no one welcomed them. Ante Pavelić himself arrived on the 13th, awaited by a small group of Frankists. They asked Pavelić for assistance against some Royal Yugoslav Army soldiers who were in the hills nearby, and received from Pavelić a number of Ustaše in response. More concretely, a large group of Yugoslav soldiers had been retreating from the Italian border through Jelenje, Lokve, Mrkopalj and Jasenak. Upon entering Mrkopalj, they were met by a Croat force belonging to Mačekova zaštita, but the Yugoslav soldiers refused to disarm.

During the mass arrests of late May and early June, the Ustaša administration of Delnice kotar was more tolerant of Serbs than in the neighbouring Vrbovsko and Ogulin kotars. Tuk Vojni was the only Serbian village in Delnice kotar. The Ustaše had a list of 15 prominent Serbs in Tuk that they needed to arrest, but thanks to JRZ members of Mrkopalj and the notary (Note: "bilježniku Peri Sinku") they were not jailed.

On 1 July 1941, Pavelić founded the Velika župa Modruš with its seat in Ogulin, by merging Ogulin with Slunj, Vrbovsko and Delnice.

In October 1941, the Minister of Sport and Mountaineering of the NDH, Miško Zebić, named Stjepan Petranović as the state povjerenik of the HPD "Risnjak", and designated as the chapter's advisory board: Nikola Premer, Makso Jelinek, Ivan Šipek, Vladimir Čurda, Vilko Tausani and Dragutin Baal. The HPD "Risnjak" was officially renamed Hrvatsko planinarsko društvo u Delnicama in March 1942, but Gospić did not reply to the order.

==== 1942 ====
At 7:30 on 12 April 1942, an Italian battalion was travelling on foot along the road from Delnice to Fužine. At the south exit from Delnice they were attacked from a small woods by Partisans of the Second Primorje-Gorski Kotar Detachment with machine guns and rifles, heavily wounding 1 and lightly wounding 4.

At 11:15 on 11 June, Partisans attacked a freight train by the "Risnik" tunnel 2 kilometres (1.2 mi) southeast of Delnice, after which the train hit a damaged stretch of track, derailing it along with 6 wagons, mortally wounding the conductor Matija Jugović (Note: He died at the Italian hospital in Delnice.) and killing 2 Italian soldiers and heavily wounding 6 soldiers. The same day, a second Italian train was attacked with rifle and machine gun fire between Lokve and Delnice, wounding a number of Italian soldiers. Then at 7:30 on 12 June, an Italian battalion set out on foot from Delnice along the state road in the direction of Fužine. When they reached the exit from Delnice, a group of Partisans armed with rifles and machine guns attacked them from a small woods, wounding 5. Then on the 13th/14th, an attack was carried out with rifles on Delnice from the surrounding forest, but was repelled without victims by Croatian and Italian forces.

On 15 July, a train encountered an improvised explosive device between Delnice and Lokve. There were no victims, and transport was restored shortly after.

At 19:00 on 11 September, a group of around 1000 Partisans attacked a guard stationed at the power plant consisting of 20 Domobrans of the 25th company of the 3rd Regiment of the Second Division, capturing the plant and blowing it up with explosives, leaving Brod Moravice, Delnice and Skrad without electricity.

==== 1944 ====
On 9–10 December 1944, there was an Omladina rally in Delnice, in which even some from Rijeka and Sušak managed to participate despite being behind enemy lines at the time.

When the 4th Army was formed in North Dalmatia in March 1945, its 11th Corps included the 13th Division as well as the 35th, 43rd and 1st. The 4th Army received instructions to first break the enemy front from the Una to the Adriatic, taking Lika, Gorski Kotar and Primorje in the process. Axis forces were pushed back after a battle in eastern Lika, and together with the 4th Corps, the 4th Army took Bihać.

In early April, the 4th Army advanced in western Lika and broke through to Gorski Kotar and Primorje. By the first half of April, it had taken all of Primorje, being at the door of Rijeka and Istria. With RAF air support and RN transportation, the 4th Army had taken Pag, Rab, and would take Lošinj. Krk would be taken without outside support. The assault to reach the Ingridstellung defensive line followed.

The battle for the Ingridstellung pitted the 4th Army against the 188th, the 237th, the remains of the 392nd, DKP, (Note: "policijske snage SS") SDK and Dinara Division, with a combined strength of around 75,000. On April 16, the staff of the 4th Army gave the order to attack the Mrzla Vodica-Lokve-Kraljevica line, leading to fierce battles on 17–20 April. The 13th, 19th and 43rd divisions took the right bank of the Rječina from the 237th, while the 26th took Krk, the 9th with Kvarnerski odred mornaričke pješadije Mornarice took Lošinj and Cres, and the 20th reached Prezid through Delnice and Brod.

On April 20, the JNA General Staff gave the order to break through to Trieste. For this, the 29th was joined to the 4th Army. The 9th and 19th would stay behind to take Rijeka, while the 13th and 26th would take Klana and Ilirska Bistrica, the 20th would cross through Mašun, and the 29th would secure the right flank at Prezid. The Axis held the Rijeka-Klana-Zabič-Knežak-Sveti Petar na Krasu, which they termed the Ingridstellung. The Battle for Rijeka began on the 21st, and from then to the 23rd the 43rd, 13th and 19th attacked the 188th, 237th and Kampfgruppe Fiume with its constituents. The attacks failed to break the line, so on the 24th the Staff of the 4th Army introduced the 26th to the attack on Klana. This attack also failed, because the 188th with about 15,000 counterattacked at Klana with the aim of pushing the 4th Army back across the Rječina. This one day long German attack on the positions of the 26th also failed.

Seeing this, the Staff of the 4th Army decided to attempt a simultaneous breakthrough north of Rijeka and landing operation from Cres to the Istrian shore at Brseč-Mošćenička Draga. A battalion of the 2nd Brigade of the 9th landed at Brseč on the night of the 24th–25th, who secured the landing site. The night of the 25th–26th, the 2nd Brigade landed at Mošćenička Draga and the 4th Brigade at Brseč. Because the Axis had transferred the remainder of the XCVII Corps to the Ingridstellung, where back-and-forth clashes continued until the 30th, they were unable to offer any resistance until after the 9th had begun operations in Istria. The bloodiest battles were taking place at Klana between the 26th and 13th on the one hand and the 188th and newly transferred troops on the other, so the 9th was able to take Medveja and Lovran on the 26th and then besiege Ičići and partly take Opatija. Then the 3rd and 4th Brigades of the 9th landed. Opatija was taken on the 28th and the attack was continued towards Volosko and the Kastavština. The 20th was bolstered with tanks and motorised artillery, and the 11th Brigade of the 26th was transferred from Rijeka with trucks to the 20th. In the meantime, the units of the 43rd had joined the 9th in Istria, operating in its interior. Thus, the 20th broke through to Ilirska Bistrica on the 28th. General Kübler pleaded with General Löhr to allow his forces in Rijeka to retreat, but he was denied permission. On the 28th, the Axis lost its ability to carry out offensive action from Rijeka.

On the Rječina, the 19th carried out attack after attack against the 237th and the Kampfgruppe, but took many casualties against the dense enemy artillery while holding them down in Rijeka as the other divisions broke deeper into enemy territory. Tito ordered the General Staff to use the breakthroughs to take Trieste. The 8th was sent to assist them in this task, and two days later the 7th was sent from Ogulin to join them. On the 29th, the 13th expanded its front from Čabarska Polica over Ilirska Bistrica in the Podgrad direction, leaving the XCVII Corps almost surrounded, with the exception of the Šapjane region and the road from there through Mune to secure German territory. The 13th was spread thin, and only joined by the 11th Brigade of the 26th, which would already leave for Trieste on the 30th. So the General Staff transferred the 26th from Klana to Ilirska Bistrica with the task of surrounding the XCVII around Rupa and Šapjane to close the encirclement. To make up for their transfer, the 19th had to expand northward. The 2nd Brigade of the 9th attacked the Kastavština, and the 13th took Podgrad and Jelšane on the 30th.

On May 1, the 9th and 20th took Trieste. On the 2nd, the 26th took Rupa and Šapjane. Rupa had been an important communication node, but on the 1st, General Löhr had transmitted a withdrawal order to the XCVII following the fall of Trieste. German troops were seen abandoning Rijeka on the 2nd, destroying the port of Rijeka and detonating various other structures in the process. The Axis withdrawal continued on the 3rd, with the 19th division and 2nd Brigade of the 9th in pursuit. T 188th attacked the 26th, forcing the latter to retreat to Ilirska Bistrica and the 13th to retreat northward. The XCVII retook Rupa and Šapjane and threatened Ilirska Bistrica while the 19th took Rijeka. Battles continued on the 4th, and on the 5th the XCVII managed to retake Ilirska Bistrica. But on the evening of the 6th, General Kübler asked for a ceasefire and capitulation talks with permission from General Löhr. The JNA consented, and after talks, the XCVII Corps signed a protocol of capitulation at 6:04 on the 7 May 1945. 16,000 Axis soldiers and officers laid down their arms, including several generals and Kübler himself.

==== 1945 ====
At the behest of Dušan Rašković, Antun Brnad parish priest of Delnice and others gathered in Delnice signed a document recognising the JNOF on 21 February 1945, selecting a delegation to represent the priesthood before their authority. Brnad was selected to enter the expanded religious commission of ZAVNOH.

=== Recent ===
On 8 December 2012, 32 centimetres (13 in) of snow fell in 12 hours, and a total of 66 centimetres (26 in) in 24 hours.

On 23 February 2013, 58 centimetres (23 in) of snow fell in 48 hours for a cumulative depth of 110 centimetres (43 in).

On 7 September 2013, a house fire in Delnice was reported at 7:20, the JVP Delnice and DVD Brod na Kupi responding. The fire was put out, but the owner of the house was killed.

Delnice was hit by the 2014 Dinaric ice storm. From 31 January to 2 February 2014, while S and SW geostrophic wind dominated, freezing rain fell on Gorski Kotar, glazing the entire region. It wrecked roofs, power lines an forests, causing power loss for about 14,000 households in Gorski Kotar, or about 80% of its population. Because of power lines falling on the A6, the highway was closed in of Rijeka between Bosiljevo and Kikovica, and between Kikovica and Delnice in the direction of Zagreb. It took about 10 days to restore essential infrastructure to the region, and within months electricity was back in most of its former range, but at a cost of about 84.4 million HRK to HEP. At the time it was the largest peacetime damage since its Secession from Yugoslavia, even without counting the forestry losses. The Šumarija Delnice lost 23% of its wood mass. Clearing blocked forestry roads and forest paths would take years, and thanks to the declining population some were never cleared. Reforestation was still ongoing as of 2019.

On 15 October 2014, 159 centimetres (63 in) of rain fell in 12 hours in Delnice.

On 6 February 2015, a heavy snowstorm led to property damage and closed roads in Delnice.

On 22 November 2015, 52 centimetres (20 in) of snow fell in 24 hours, setting a November record for Delnice.

On 11–12 December 2017, severe wind damaged roofs and closed roads in and around Delnice.

On 28 October 2018, strong convective precipitation caused flash flooding in Delnice, with 156 millimetres (6.1 in) over 24 hours reported on the 29th. Firefighters had to pump water out of flooded basements.

On 16 September 2022, 56.39 millimetres (2.220 in) of rain fell in a 2-hour period in Delnice. Then on 29 September of the same year, 79.55 millimetres (3.132 in) of rain fell in the same period.

On 22 July 2023, hail up to 3 centimetres (1.2 in) in diameter fell on the territory of Delnice.

On 20 October 2023, strong winds toppled trees in and around Delnice.

On 1 December 2023, 172 millimetres (6.8 in) of rain fell in a 24-hour period in Delnice.

== Demographics ==
The municipality consists of the following settlements (population as of 2021):

- Bela Vodica, population ▲28
- Belo, population ▼6
- Biljevina, population ▼3
- Brod na Kupi, population ▼156
- Crni Lug, population ▼209
- Čedanj, population ▼3
- Dedin, population ▼154
- Delnice, population ▼3861
- Donja Krašićevica, population 0
- Donje Tihovo, population ▼4
- Donji Ložac, population ▼5
- Donji Okrug, population ▼1
- Donji Turni, population 0
- Gašparci, population ▼11
- Golik, population ▼7
- Gornja Krašićevica, population ▲3
- Gornje Tihovo, population ▼4
- Gornji Ložac, population ▼5
- Gornji Okrug, population 2
- Gornji Turni, population ▼9
- Grbajel, population ▼11
- Guče Selo, population ▼19
- Gusti Laz, population ▲6
- Hrvatsko, population 49
- Iševnica, population ▼5
- Kalić, population ▼0
- Kočičin, population ▼0
- Krivac, population ▼18
- Kupa, population ▼5
- Kuželj, population ▼28
- Leska, population 3
- Lučice, population ▼298
- Mala Lešnica, population ▼7
- Malo Selo, population ▼40
- Marija Trošt, population ▼38
- Plajzi, population 0
- Podgora Turkovska, population ▼3
- Požar, population ▼4
- Radočaj Brodski, population ▼5
- Raskrižje Tihovo, population ▼3
- Razloge, population ▼5
- Razloški Okrug, population ▼2
- Sedalce, population ▼12
- Srednja Krašićevica, population 0
- Suhor, population 0
- Ševalj, population ▲1
- Turke, population ▼19
- Velika Lešnica, population ▼4
- Velika Voda, population 0
- Zagolik, population 0
- Zakrajc Turkovski, population ▼0
- Zalesina, population ▼31
- Zamost Brodski, population ▼35
- Zapolje Brodsko, population ▼12
- Zelin Crnoluški, population 0
Town of Delnice: Population trends 1857–2021
v

population	6929	7289	6797	7007	7172	7651	7322	7337	6609	7592	7652	7291	6817	6858	6262	5952	5135
	1857	1869	1880	1890	1900	1910	1921	1931	1948	1953	1961	1971	1981	1991	2001	2011	2021

Note:Formed from the old municipality of Delnica. Sources: Croatian Bureau of Statistics publications

In 1870, Delnice was the seat of its own tax district and its own podžupanija within the Rijeka županija. The Delnice podžupanija encompassed Delnice, Lokve, Fužine, Mrkopalj, Ravnagora, Brod, Skrad u Dobri, Vrbovsko, Čabar, Prezid and Gerovo. The podžupanija had 5080 houses and 35,823 people. Delnice općina had 466 houses, with a population of 3558. Its 10 villages were divided into 2 porezne općine for taxation purposes. Parishes included Delnice and Crni Lug.

In 1890, Delnice općina, with an area of 71 square kilometres (27 mi^{2}), belonged to the kotar of Delnice (Delnice court and electoral district) in the županija of Modruš-Rieka (Ogulin court and financial board). There were 382 houses, with a population of 2763. Its 3 villages and 5 hamlets were encompassed for taxation purposes by a single porezna obćina, under the Delnice office. In the 634 square kilometres (245 mi^{2}) Delnice kotar, there were a total of 3664 houses, with a population of 21,943. Its 128 villages and 24 hamlets were divided into 19 porezne obćine. The kotar had one market, in Mrkopalj. Delnice kotar was divided into 9 općine. Besides itself: Brod na Kupi, Brod Moravice, Crni Lug, Fužine, Lič, Lokve, Mrkopalj, Skrad.

In 1910, the court of Delnice encompassed an area of 634 square kilometres (245 mi^{2}), with a population of 21,735. Delnice had its own cadastral jurisdiction, but its business court was in Ogulin.

By early 1919, 7827 people had emigrated from Delnice Kotar to the United States and 1157 to other countries.

Village of Delnice: Population trends 1857–2021
v

population	2315	2453	2544	2544	2840	3071	3298	3123	3149	3840	4042	4308	4351	4696	4451	4379	3861
	1857	1869	1880	1890	1900	1910	1921	1931	1948	1953	1961	1971	1981	1991	2001	2011	2021

Note:Decreased in 1981 by the population of Lučice, independent from then on. Sources: Croatian Bureau of Statistics publications

== Economy ==
There was a sawmill in Delnice.

== Governance ==
=== National ===
Representatives of the Delnice kotar at the Sabor and Skupština: (Note: "изборни срез")

- Faustin Suppé (1861)
- Antun Zoričić (1861), NS/NLS
- Vjekoslav Begna (1865–1867)
- ? (1867)
- Josip Tomac (1868), (Note: Vrbovsko-Delnice) NLS
- Matija Mrazović (1871–1872) (Note: Delnice-Vrbovsko in 1871, simultaneously representing Zagreb I; just Delnice in 1872, simultaneously representing Zagreb III.)
- Tomislav Cuculić (1872–1875)
- Andrija Valušnik (1878–1892), SP
- Pavao Muhić (1878–1881)
- Ante Starčević (1892–1896), SP
- David Starčević (1896–1901), SP/SP-UO/ČSP
- August Harambašić (1901–1906)
- Franko Potočnjak (1906–1908)
- Frano Supilo (1908–1911)
- Franjo Serafin Križ (1911–1918)
- Ivan Krnic (1918)
- sede vacante (1918–1923)

At the 1920 Kingdom of Serbs, Croats and Slovenes Constitutional Assembly election in Modruš-Rijeka County, Delnice voted mainly for the Communist Party.

Results at the polls in Delnice
Year	Station	Voters	Electors	NRS	DSD	KPJ	HPSS	Independent	SS	HSP	HZ
1920	I	630	326	2	21	228	13	6	4	2	50
1920	II	533	273		12	209	9	1	5	4	33

=== Municipal ===
Delnice kotar was subordinated to Modruš-Rijeka County until 1922 when the latter was replaced with Primorje-Krajina Oblast, which was unpopular with most Croats and was as a concession replaced in 1929 with the Sava Banovina.

At the time, Delnice was divided into 9 općine: Brod Moravice, Brod na Kupi, Delnice, Lič, Lokve, Mrkopalj, Skrad, Fužine and Crni Lug.

== Media ==
Radio Gorski Kotar, founded as a state institution in 1969, is the only FM radio station based in Gorski Kotar, although the regionally available Radio Rijeka and Radio Ogulin often also cover Gorski Kotar.

== Notable people ==
Notable people that were born or lived in Delnice include:

- Ivan Robespierre Crnković (1793 – 1897), of the Crnković noble family
- Ivan Cvetko (1804 – 1884), parish priest in Drenova
- Franjo Rački (25 November 1828 – 13 February 1894)
- Fran Pilepić (18 July 1838 – 13 April 1890)
- Ivan Bolf (1856 – 13 March 1929), merchant and businessman
- Milorad Drašković (10 April 1873 – 21 July 1921), Serb politician assassinated in Delnice
- Ivan Krnic (7 April 1878 – 15 November 1937), judge, politician, novelist
- Stjepan Petranović (29 December 1878 – 30 March 1944), priest, author
- Ivan Šubašić (7 May 1892 – 22 March 1955), last Ban of Croatia
- Živko Bolf (4 March 1894 – 7 May 1982), orthodontist, professor
- Alija Alijagić (20 November 1896 – 8 March 1922), assassin
- Slavko Janković (1 January 1897 – 29 June 1971), ethnomusicologist
- Dragutin Domainko (7 March 1899 – 27 January 1978), economist
- Ivan Lenac (6 February 1906 – 24 April 1945)
- Josip Šafar (9 October 1906 – 2 January 1988), forest scientist
- Josip Kajfeš (17 September 1909 – 2 June 1944)
- Branko Pleše (12 January 1915 – 28 March 1980)
- Viktor Bubanj (3 December 1918 – 15 October 1972)
- Zdenko Petranović (8 April 1919 – 21 April 1942)
- Ante Sekulić (16 November 1920 – 18 August 2016), linguist, historian
- Konstantin Milles (1 January 1922 – 6 December 1989), journalist, translator
- Radovan Pavić (30 May 1933 – 4 May 2020), geographer, geostrategist
- Grga Marjanović (1933 – 2009)
- Dubravko Majnarić (4 February 1936 – 13 February 2025), musician
- Zlatko Crnković (27 May 1936 – 14 February 2012), actor
- Alojz Majetić (30 August 1938 –), author
- Drago Carl Herenda (1942 –), veterinarian
- Franjo Smiljanić (1 January 1951 – 28 July 2012)
- Katarina Tomaševski (8 February 1953 – 4 October 2006), law professor

== Climate ==
Since records began in 1981, the highest temperature recorded at the local weather station was 35.0 °C (95.0 °F), on 3 August 2017. The coldest temperature was −25.0 °C (−13.0 °F), on 8 January 1985.

Between 1992 and 2007, the lowest temperature at the COB station was −20.2 °C (−4.4 °F), on 2 March 2005.

A weather station exists there at an elevation of 735 metres (2,411 ft). The minimum recorded temperature for the winter of 2024–2025 was −11.3 °C (11.7 °F), on February 19 and 20.

== Sports ==
=== Bowling ===
Delnice is home to the bowling clubs Goranin and Mladost, who meet at the Goranski sportski centar, founded 1994, The best bowlers of both teams have competed in the 2nd League, while the local individual record is 659, set in 2019 by Bojan Vlakevski.

=== Cycling ===
Beginning in 2013, Delnice is the start and end of the 7 stage 260 kilometres (160 mi) long Cycling Trail of Gorski Kotar (Croatian: Goranska biciklistička transverzala).

The "Gorski Kotar Bike Tour", held annually since 2012, sometimes goes through Delnice, such as in the first leg for 2023.

== Infrastructure ==
Delnice is well connected to numerous local and national destinations by train and bus. Rijeka (Croatia's third largest city) is half an hour away by road.

=== Security ===
The 138th Brigade was stationed in Delnice.

In 1913, there were three gendarmeries in Delnice kotar: one in Delnice itself, one in Brod Moravice and one in Fužine.

=== Education ===
In the school year of 1939–1940, there were 26 schools on the territory of Delnice srez (1 in Delnice plus the Građanska škola and Stručna škola, 7 in Brod na Kupi, 3 in Brod Moravice, 1 in Crni Lug, 2 in Fužine, 1 in Lič, 3 in Lokve, 5 in Mrkopalj, 3 in Skrad), with 59 teachers, of which 57 Catholic and 2 Orthodox; there were 2263 students, of which 2224 Catholic, 37 Orthodox and 2 of an unspecified non-Muslim "Other" faith. 98 students obligated to attend did not, or 4.2% of the obligated population, which by national standards was low.

=== Judiciary ===
In 1875, the kotar court of Delnice, subordinate to the royal court at Zagreb, encompassed an 1870 population of 28,347, being responsible for the općine: Delnice, Lokve, Fužine, Mrkopalj, Ravna Gora, Brod, Skrad, Vrbovsko.

== Tourism ==
The 1.44 kilometres (0.89 mi) long linden avenue on the main street in Delnice was planted in the second half of the 19th century.

The 29,955 square metres (322,430 ft^{2}) Park kralja Tomislava dates to the beginning of the 20th century, renewed under I. Žigman.

The 171 hectares (420 acres) forest park of Japlenski vrh overlooking Delnice was protected in 1953.

Delnice and the surrounding county of Gorski Kotar's pristine nature offer a plethora of outdoor opportunities for an active vacation. Some of the activities include cycling, mountain climbing, rock climbing, running, hiking, cross-country running, skiing, cross-country skiing, snowboarding, camping, kayaking, river rafting and hunting. Delnice has many shops, bars and restaurants.

Mountain guides operate out of Delnice for destinations like Kamenjak (837), the Staza sedam slapova in Buzet, Petrova Gora, Krk, Labin, Vražji prolaz and Zeleni vir, Klek, Snježnik, Risnjak, Preradovićev vrh, the castles in Kostel and Stara Sušica and so on. Delnice organisations also organise rafting on the Kupa and Lake Lokve.

== Selected works ==
- Laloš, Željko (2011). Zrnca delničke duše [Kernels of the Delnice Soul] (in Croatian). Delnice: Grad Delnice. ISBN 978-953-95137-2-4.
- Knežević, Ivica (2010). Prošećimo Delnicama [Let's Walk Through Delnice] (in Croatian). Zagreb: Društvo Goranin. ISBN 978-953-56378-0-6.

== Bibliography ==
- OONF PGO (1945-03-19). "Svećenstvo Gorskog Kotara pristupa JNOf-i". Primorski vjesnik: Glasilo jedinstvene Narodno-oslobodilačke fronte Hrvatskog primorja (in Serbo-Croatian). No. 144. p. 4.
- Trgo, Fabijan, ed. (1964). Zbornik dokumenata i podataka o Narodno-oslobodilačkom ratu Jugoslovenskih naroda. Vol. V, 32.
