= Crni Lug =

Crni Lug, which translates as "Black Grove" from Serbo-Croatian, may refer to the following villages:

- Crni Lug, Croatia, in Primorje-Gorski Kotar County
- Crni Lug, Vranje, Serbia
- Crni Lug, Bosansko Grahovo, Bosnia and Herzegovina
- Carallukë (Crni Lug) near Istog, Kosovo
