= Suhor =

Suhor may refer to:

== Places ==
=== Slovenia ===
- Suhor, Novo Mesto, Novo Mesto
- Suhor, Metlika:

- Dolnji Suhor pri Metliki, Metlika
- Gornji Suhor pri Metliki, Metlika

- Suhor pri Dolenjskih Toplicah, Dolenjske Toplice
- Suhor, Kostel

=== Croatia ===
- Suhor, Croatia, a former village near Delnice

== People ==
- David Suhor (born 1968), American jazz musician and teacher
- Yvonne Suhor (1961-2018), American actress
