= Risnjak National Park =

- Nacionalni park Risnjak (Croatian)
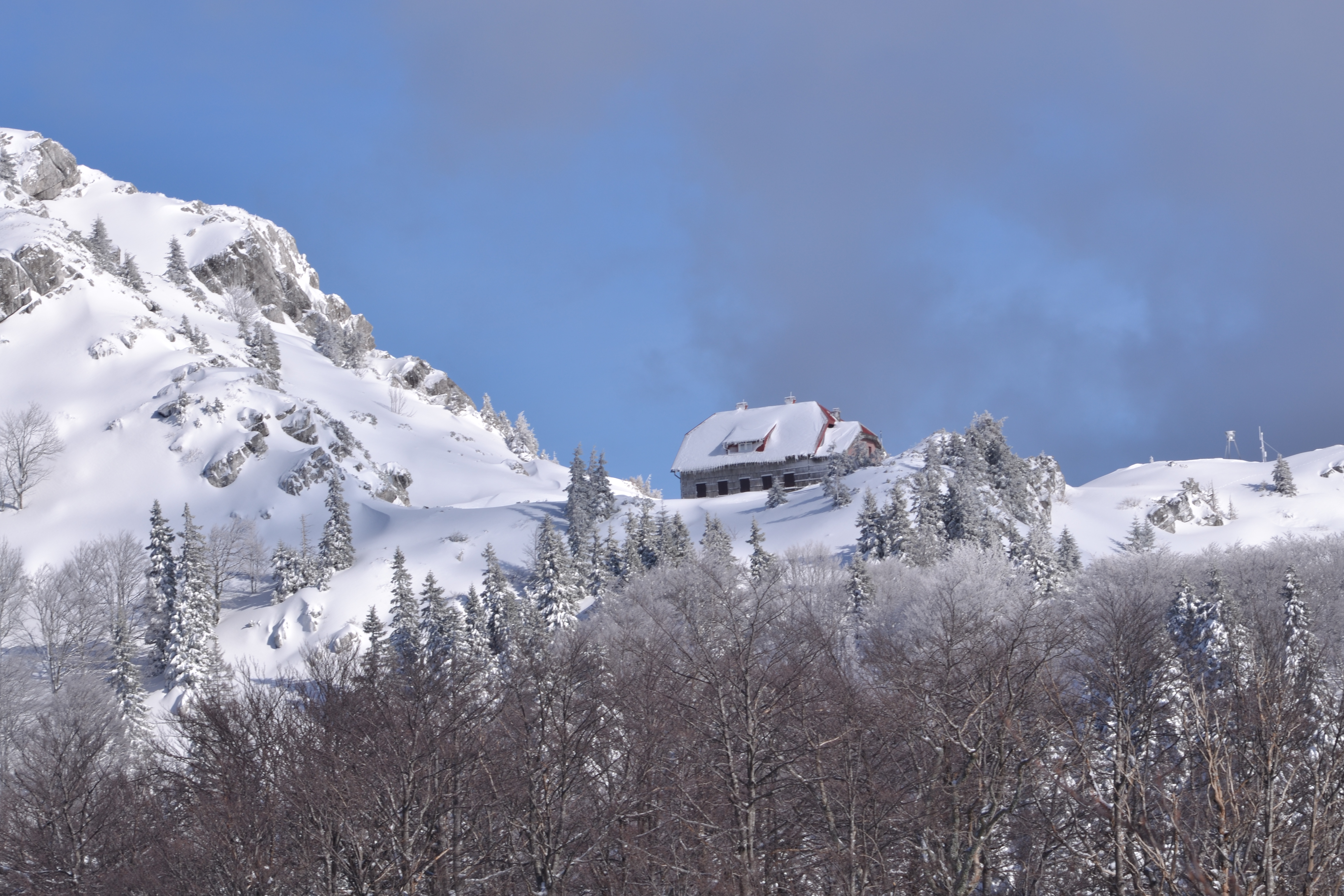
- Mountain lodge on winter

- Location within Croatia
- 45°25′42″N 14°44′42″E
- Location: Primorje-Gorski Kotar County, Croatia

Site notes
- Elevation: 1,528 m (peak)
- Area: 63.5 km^{2}
- Governing body: Risnjak National Park
- Visitors: 16,835 (in 2018)

Protected Natural Value of Croatia
- Official name: Nacionalni park Risnjak
- Designated: 1949

Risnjak National Park (Croatian: Nacionalni park Risnjak) is a national park in Croatia. It is located in Gorski Kotar, the most mountainous and heavily forested region of the country, about 15 km inland from the Adriatic Sea. The park covers an area of 63.5 square kilometers including the central part of Risnjak and Snježnik massif and the source area of the river Kupa. The administration and visitor center of the park are located in Crni Lug, a village on the eastern edge of the park.

== Etymology ==
The name of the massif probably comes from the Croatian word for the lynx, ris. Another interpretation suggests that it comes from the local word risje, which is a name for a type of grass.

== History ==
The first recorded scientific visit was made in 1825 by the Budapest botanist Joseph Standler. Many other botanists visited subsequently. The most prominent 19th century explorer of Risnjak was the botanist Josip Schlosser who wrote numerous publications about Risnjak and its flora. The first organized mountaineering visit was mounted by the Rijeka alpine club, and the first mountain refuge in the area was built in 1932.

In 1949 botanist Ivo Horvat suggested for the first time that the area around Risnjak should be protected. On his advice, the parliament of the then Socialist Republic of Croatia declared 36.00 km^{2} around Risnjak to be a national park. In 1956 the area of the park was reduced to 30.14 km^{2}, of which 21.06 km^{2} were put under stricter protection. Finally, in 1997, the Croatian parliament voted to enlarge of the park to its current size. The areas of Snježnik and Kupa source were added to the park but also for the first time inhabited areas of villages of Razloge, Razloški okrug and Krašćevica.

== Geography ==
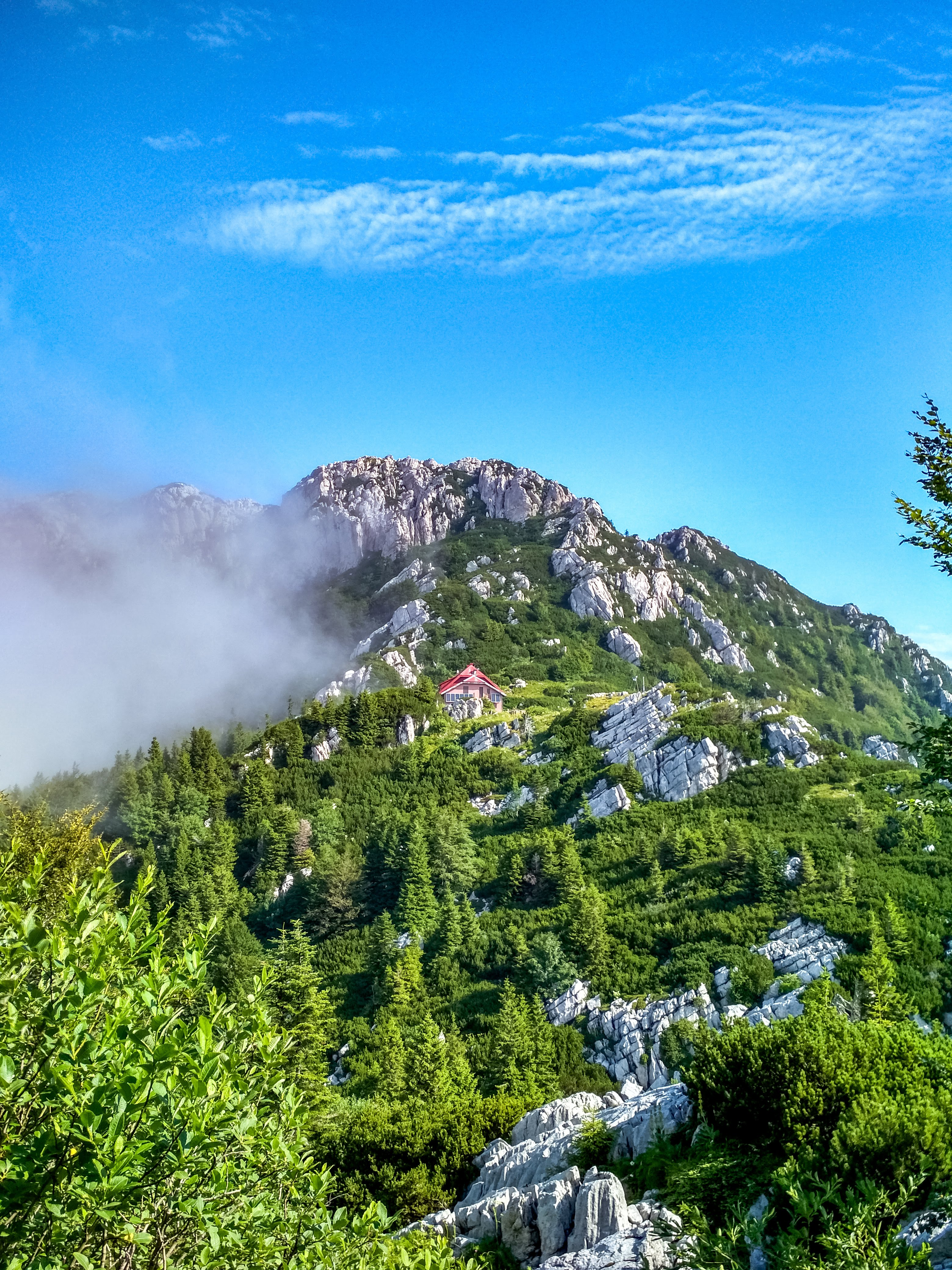
Mountain hut Schlosser on Risnjak

The park is entirely in Primorje-Gorski Kotar county, and is divided between the city of Čabar, the city of Delnice and the municipality of Jelenje. The highest point of the park is Veliki Risnjak (1528 m) and the lowest is the area around the source of the Kupa (313 m). The massif is located on the northern part of the Dinaric Alps, and marks the divide between the Adriatic and Black Sea watersheds.

Like most of the Dinaric Alps, the park is dominated by limestone and dolomite rocks and shows major karst features: ponikve, karren on bare rocks, rock falls, swallow holes, caves and so on. Because the limestone is very porous there are few surface flows of water.

=== Climate ===
Although Risnjak is of only a modest altitude, it is nevertheless a very significant climatic and vegetational barrier between coastal and continental parts of Croatia. Adriatic and continental weather patterns collide here and play a significant role in determining the park's climate. It has pleasantly warm summers and an average temperature of up to 22 °C; springs and autumns are rainy, and the winter is long and snowy. The average year-round temperature at the Risnjak mountain lodge is 2.5 °C with an annual rainfall of 3600 mm, which is amongst the highest in the country, and an average snow depth of between 122 and 448 cm.

Areas within the park called ponikvas experience a microclimate where, because of temperature inversions, the lower regions are colder than those at higher altitudes. In ponikvas the winter snow lasts much longer than elsewhere.

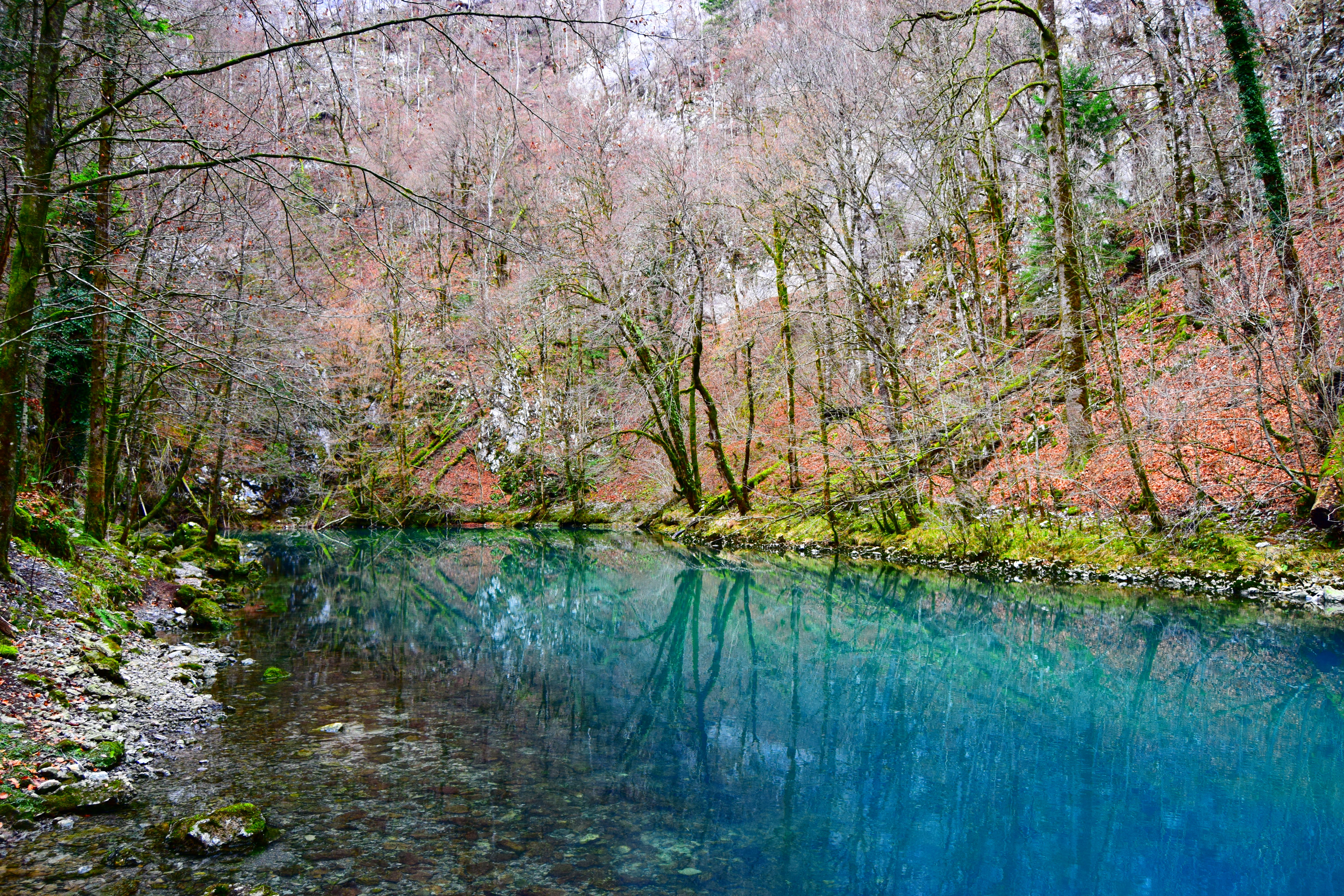
Forest by the Kupa river

=== Flora ===
Although the park occupies only a relatively small area, very diverse types of flora can be found. It marks the point where the coastal and continental vegetation zones meet, as well as combining the Dinaric and Alpine zones. This produces great floral variety across the multiple ecotones found in the park.

Most of the park is covered by a mixture of beech and fir trees growing on limestone and dolomite. Numerous variations characterised by local microclimates and types of soil can also be found. Here one can find single trees of sycamore maple, elm, ash, and sometimes some yew. The beech and fir forest gradually gives way to another large forest zone - the subalpine beech forest with lettuce grass, which grows in areas of the park at heights of between 1200 m and 1400 m above sea level.

The upper border of this ecotone is marked by impenetrable underbrush in form of shrubs creating a unique ecosystem, which has been termed the Fagelatum croaticum subalpinum fruticosu. Above the subalpine beech forest there grows the last, highest forest ecosystem - crooked shrubby pine.

The rocky peak of Risnjak is characterised by some especially interesting flora. The peak is home to a variety of rare and sometimes endangered species such as the edelweiss, black vanilla orchid, mountain milfoil, alpine yellow violet, livelong saxifrage, alpine snowbell, mountain avens and hairy alpine rose.

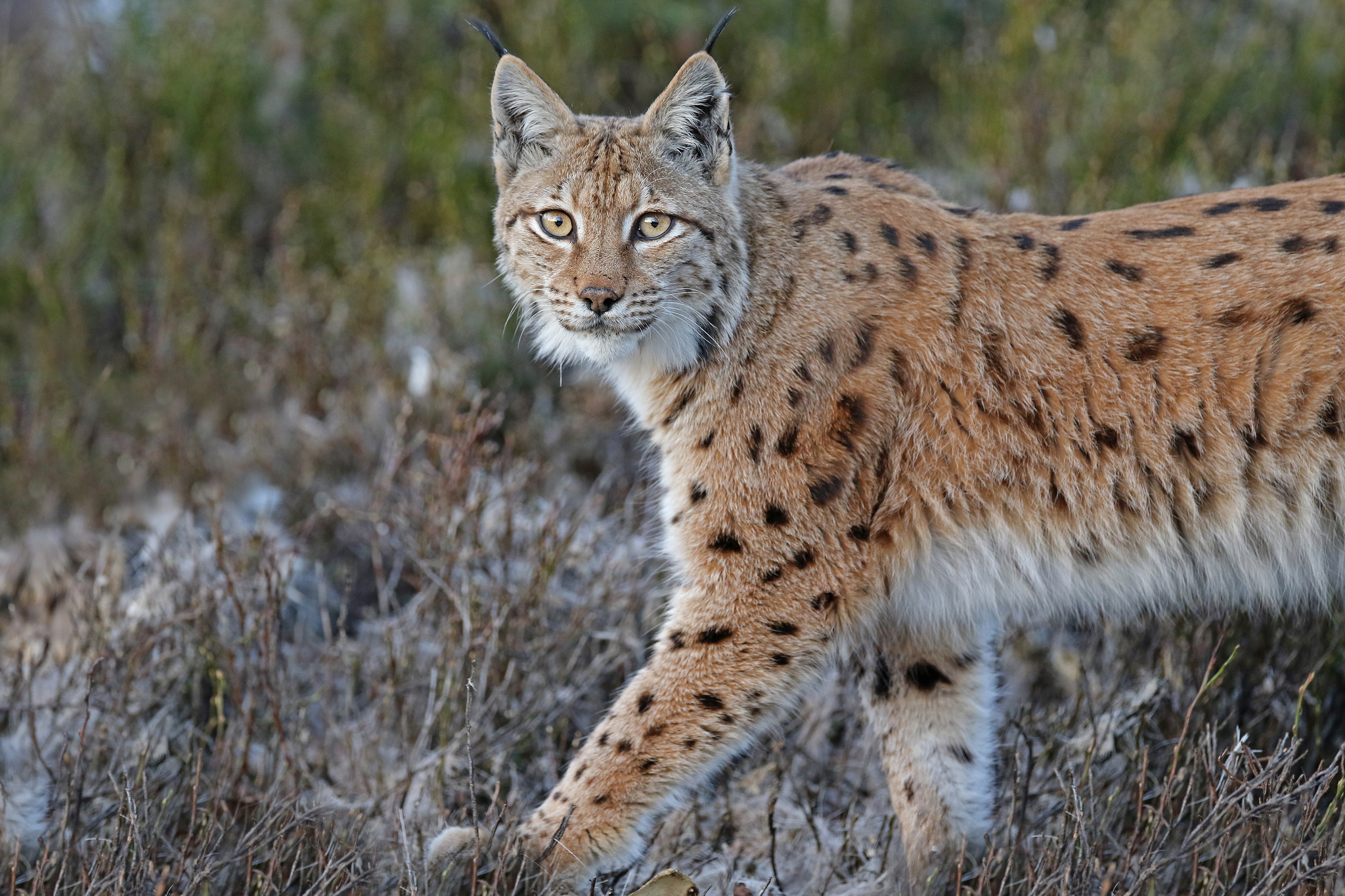
Park is a natural habitat of Eurasian lynx

=== Fauna ===
The fauna is just as diverse as the flora. The park is home to mammals such as the brown bear, red deer, roe deer, chamois, wild boar, wolf, pine marten, stone marten, badger, weasel, squirrel and dormouse. The most important animal used to be the lynx, after which Risnjak got its name. The lynx was exterminated during the 19th century but returned to Risnjak three decades ago, after a successful reintroduction project in neighboring Slovenia. There are also numerous bird species living in Risnjak: capercaillie, hazel grouse, goshawk, eagle owl and several woodpecker species, amongst others. A number of amphibians and reptiles, as well as various insect and snail taxa can also be found.

== Places of interest ==
Due to its closeness to major road connections (motorway Zagreb - Rijeka) and vicinity of major tourist centers on the coastline it is most visited National Park in Croatia.

=== Risnjak ===
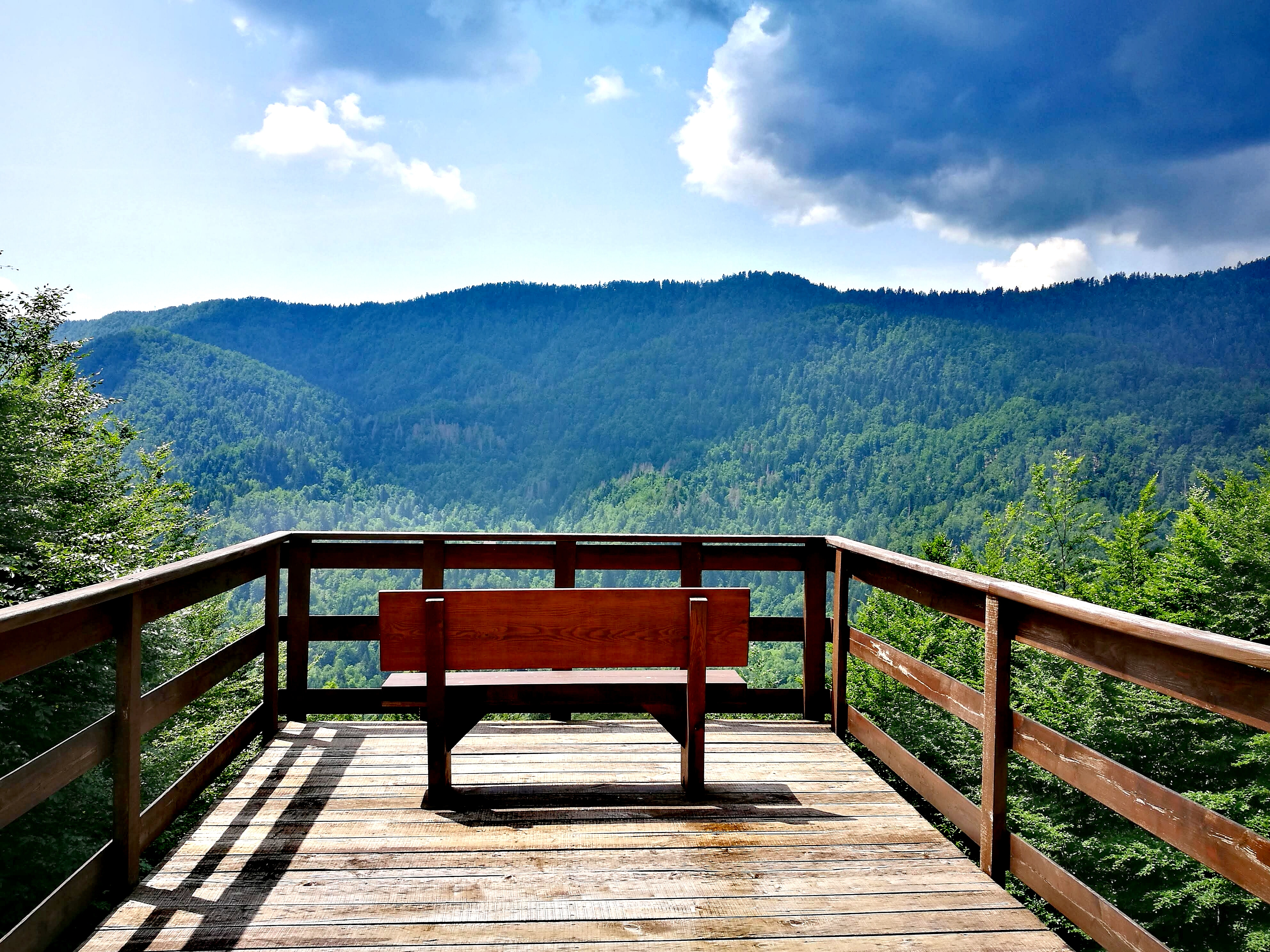
Risnjak Landscape.

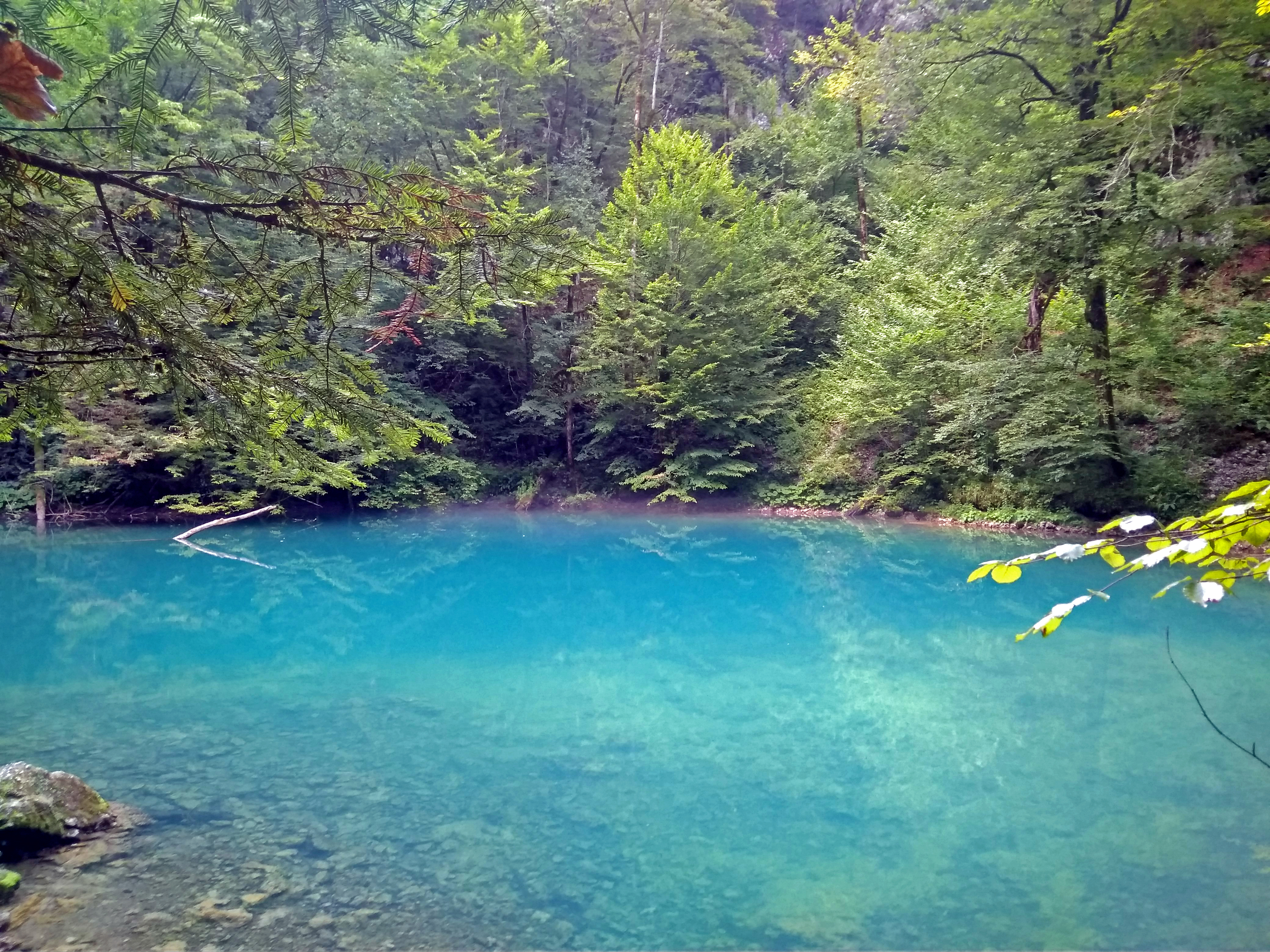
Source of Kupa.

Veliki Risnjak is the highest peak in the park and the second in Gorski kotar next to Bjelolasica. On its southern slope is located the mountain lodge called Šloserov dom, built by Josip Schlosser. The peak can be reached only on foot, from Crni Lug (3 h) or from an unpaved road beginning in Gornje Jelenje (1h).

=== Snježnik ===
Snježnik is the second highest peak in the park at 1506 m. Its name comes from the word for snow - snijeg. The mountain should not be confused with Snežnik, a limestone plateau 20 km to the north-west in Slovenia. On its grassy peak is located a mountain lodge called Albaharijev dom. It is about 1.5 hours' walk from the ski resort of Platak; this has made it the most common place for tour skiing in Croatia.

=== Guslica ===
Guslica is a peak about an hour's walk from Snježnik, with an altitude of 1490 m. It is the site of an abandoned Yugoslav People's Army complex. Since the army left in 1991 the whole place was left to rot, giving it something of the appearance of a ghost town. There have been proposals to renovate the complex to create a mountain refuge, but these have not come to fruition.

=== Educational path Leska ===
This path was created by the park administration 1993. It is a circular walk 4.5 km long, beginning and ending at the visitor center in Crni Lug. The path passes through areas of different vegetation and through many different karstic features.

=== Source of Kupa ===
The river Kupa has its source at the park's lowest point, in an oval pond some 50 m wide. Numerous expeditions have attempted to determine the pond's depth. Results thus far show that the water springs from two separate channels; the narrower channel is 86 m deep while the wider channel is 57 m. The source can be reached by half an hour's walk from the village of Razloge.

=== Wild animal observation in the Lazac meadow ===
The national park maintains an overnight wild animal observation program at the Lazac meadow.

== See also ==
- Kupa river
- Primorje-Gorski Kotar county
- Crni Lug
- List of protected areas of Croatia
