= Zapolje =

Zapolje may refer to:

- Zapolje, Bosnia and Herzegovina, a village near Bratunac
- Zapolje, Croatia, a village near Rešetari
- Zapolje Brodsko, a village near Delnice
