= Požar =

Požar may refer to:

- Požar, Croatia, a village near Delnice
- Hrvoje Požar (1916–1991), Croatian engineer
- Požar, Montenegro, a village in Danilovgrad Municipality
- Požar, Kosovo, a village near Dečani

== See also ==
- Tomáš Požár, Czech footballer
