= Mune =

Mune may refer to:

== Places ==
Two villages are sometimes collectively known as Mune:

- Male Mune, a village in Matulji municipality, Croatia
- Vele Mune, a village in Matulji municipality, Croatia

=== Mills ===
- Grutte Mûne, Broeksterwâld, Friesland, Netherlands
- Hegebeintumer Mûne, Friesland, Netherlands

== People ==
- Ian Mune (born 1941), New Zealand actor, director, and screenwriter
- Muné Tsenpo, 8th century Emperor of Tibet
- Yuma Mune (born 1996), Japanese baseball player

== Other ==
- Mune: Guardian of the Moon, a French animation film

== See also ==
- Motor unit number estimation, abbreviated as MUNE
