= Gornji Okrug =

Settlement in Primorje-Gorski Kotar County, Croatia

- Settlement
- Interactive map of Gornji Okrug
- Location of Gornji Okrug in Croatia
- Coordinates: 45°27′28″N 14°42′47″E
- Country: Croatia
- County: Primorje-Gorski Kotar
- City: Delnice

Area
  - Total: 0.1 km^{2} (0.039 sq mi)

Population (2021)
  - Total: 2
  - Density: 20/km^{2} (52/sq mi)
- Time zone: UTC+1 (CET)
  - Summer (DST): UTC+2 (CEST)
- Postal code: 51300 Delnice

Gornji Okrug is a settlement in the City of Delnice in Croatia. In 2021, its population was 2.

== Demographics ==
Gornji Okrug: Population trends 1857–2021
v

population	25	15	13	14	22	24	18	18	29	9	9	8	8	5	4	2	2
	1857	1869	1880	1890	1900	1910	1921	1931	1948	1953	1961	1971	1981	1991	2001	2011	2021

Sources: Croatian Bureau of Statistics publications
