= Velika Lešnica =

- Village
- Interactive map of Velika Lešnica
- Coordinates: 45°26′29″N 14°50′33″E
- Country: Croatia
- County: Primorje-Gorski Kotar County
- Town: Delnice

Area
  - Total: 6.5 km^{2} (2.5 sq mi)

Population (2021)
  - Total: 4
  - Density: 0.62/km^{2} (1.6/sq mi)
- Time zone: UTC+1 (CET)
  - Summer (DST): UTC+2 (CEST)
- Postal code: 51300 Delnice

Velika Lešnica is a village in Primorje-Gorski Kotar County in Croatia, on the territory of the city of Delnice.

== Demographics ==
Village of Velika Lešnica: Population trends 1857–2021
v

population	129	137	156	138	119	135	108	101	70	65	53	45	35	23	22	16	4
	1857	1869	1880	1890	1900	1910	1921	1931	1948	1953	1961	1971	1981	1991	2001	2011	2021

Sources: Croatian Bureau of Statistics publications

== Climate ==
A weather station exists there at an elevation of 331 metres (1,086 ft). The minimum recorded temperature for the winter of 2024–2025 was −8.8 °C (16.2 °F), on February 20th.
