= Biljevina =

Settlement in Croatia

- settlement
- Interactive map of Biljevina
- Location within Croatia
- Coordinates: 45°27′19″N 14°42′58″E
- Country: Croatia
- County: Primorje-Gorski Kotar
- City: Delnice

Area
  - Total: 0.2 km^{2} (0.077 sq mi)

Population (2021)
  - Total: 3
  - Density: 15/km^{2} (39/sq mi)
- Time zone: UTC+1 (CET)
  - Summer (DST): UTC+2 (CEST)
- Postal code: 51300 Delnice

Biljevina is a settlement in the City of Delnice in Croatia. In 2021, its population was 3.

== Demographics ==
Biljevina: Population trends 1857–2021
v

population	29	21	18	13	11	5	3	2	5	11	11	4	6	5	5	4	3
	1857	1869	1880	1890	1900	1910	1921	1931	1948	1953	1961	1971	1981	1991	2001	2011	2021

Sources: Croatian Bureau of Statistics publications
