= Sedalce =

Settlement in Primorje-Gorski Kotar County, Croatia

- Settlement
- Interactive map of Sedalce
- Location of Sedalce in Croatia
- Coordinates: 45°30′26″N 14°45′44″E
- Country: Croatia
- County: Primorje-Gorski Kotar
- City: Delnice

Area
  - Total: 1.2 km^{2} (0.46 sq mi)

Population (2021)
  - Total: 12
  - Density: 10/km^{2} (26/sq mi)
- Time zone: UTC+1 (CET)
  - Summer (DST): UTC+2 (CEST)
- Postal code: 51300 Delnice
- Area code: +385 (0)1

Sedalce is a settlement in Delnice, Croatia. In 2021, its population was 12.

== Demographics ==
Sedalce: Population trends 1857–2021
v

population	125	105	73	72	82	79	54	67	65	54	37	24	20	24	21	16	12
	1857	1869	1880	1890	1900	1910	1921	1931	1948	1953	1961	1971	1981	1991	2001	2011	2021

Sources: Croatian Bureau of Statistics publications
