= Donja Krašićevica =

Settlement in Primorje-Gorski Kotar County, Croatia

- Settlement
- Interactive map of Donja Krašićevica
- Location of Donja Krašićevica in Croatia
- Coordinates: 45°28′26″N 14°42′00″E
- Country: Croatia
- County: Primorje-Gorski Kotar
- City: Delnice

Area
  - Total: 0.2 km^{2} (0.077 sq mi)

Population (2021)
  - Total: 0
  - Density: 0.0/km^{2} (0.0/sq mi)
- Time zone: UTC+1 (CET)
  - Summer (DST): UTC+2 (CEST)
- Postal code: 51300 Delnice

Donja Krašićevica is a settlement in the City of Delnice in Croatia. In 2021, its population was 0.

== Demographics ==
Donja Krašićevica: Population trends 1857–2021
v

population	28	35	25	20	28	42	35	49	11	13	18	16	4
	1857	1869	1880	1890	1900	1910	1921	1931	1948	1953	1961	1971	1981	1991	2001	2011	2021

Sources: Croatian Bureau of Statistics publications
