= Leska, Croatia =

Settlement in Croatia

Leska
- settlement
- Interactive map of Leska
- Location within Croatia
- Coordinates: 45°25′01″N 14°40′04″E
- Country: Croatia
- County: Primorje-Gorski Kotar
- City: Delnice

Area
  - Total: 13.9 km^{2} (5.4 sq mi)

Population (2021)
  - Total: 3
  - Density: 0.22/km^{2} (0.56/sq mi)
- Time zone: UTC+1 (CET)
  - Summer (DST): UTC+2 (CEST)
- Postal code: 51300 Delnice

Leska is a settlement in the City of Delnice in Croatia. In 2021, its population was 3.

== Demographics ==
Leska: Population trends 1857–2021
v

population				3	11	13	10	7	12	12	11	4	2		2	3	3
	1857	1869	1880	1890	1900	1910	1921	1931	1948	1953	1961	1971	1981	1991	2001	2011	2021

Sources: Croatian Bureau of Statistics publications

== Bibliography ==
=== Biology ===
- Šašić, Martina; Nahirnić, Ana; Tarmann, Gerhard M. (2016-12-31). "Zygaenidae (Lepidoptera) in the Lepidoptera collections of the Croatian Natural History Museum". Natura Croatica: Periodicum Musei Historiae Naturalis Croatici. 25 (2): 233–248. doi:10.20302/NC.2016.25.19. eISSN 1848-7386.
