= Zamost Brodski =

Settlement in Primorje-Gorski Kotar County, Croatia

- Settlement
- Interactive map of Zamost Brodski
- Location of Zamost Brodski in Croatia
- Coordinates: 45°27′46″N 14°51′39″E
- Country: Croatia
- County: Primorje-Gorski Kotar
- City: Delnice

Area
  - Total: 1.4 km^{2} (0.54 sq mi)

Population (2021)
  - Total: 35
  - Density: 25/km^{2} (65/sq mi)
- Time zone: UTC+1 (CET)
  - Summer (DST): UTC+2 (CEST)
- Postal code: 51300 Delnice

Zamost Brodski is a settlement in the City of Delnice in Croatia. In 2021, its population was 35.

== Demographics ==
Zamost Brodski: Population trends 1857–2021
v

population	49	100	96	96	83	81	77	70	53	73	52	59	57	38	39	36	35
	1857	1869	1880	1890	1900	1910	1921	1931	1948	1953	1961	1971	1981	1991	2001	2011	2021

Sources: Croatian Bureau of Statistics publications
