= Srednja Krašićevica =

Settlement in Primorje-Gorski Kotar County, Croatia

- Settlement
- Interactive map of Srednja Krašićevica
- Location of Srednja Krašićevica in Croatia
- Coordinates: 45°28′21″N 14°41′45″E
- Country: Croatia
- County: Primorje-Gorski Kotar
- City: Delnice

Area
  - Total: 0.5 km^{2} (0.19 sq mi)

Population (2021)
  - Total: 0
  - Density: 0.0/km^{2} (0.0/sq mi)
- Time zone: UTC+1 (CET)
  - Summer (DST): UTC+2 (CEST)
- Postal code: 51300 Delnice

Srednja Krašićevica is a settlement in the City of Delnice in Croatia. In 2021, its population was 0.

== Demographics ==
Srednja Krašićevica: Population trends 1857–2021
v

population	24	32	25	34	28	28	15	17	5	6	5	3	1	1
	1857	1869	1880	1890	1900	1910	1921	1931	1948	1953	1961	1971	1981	1991	2001	2011	2021

Sources: Croatian Bureau of Statistics publications
