= Donji Okrug =

Settlement in Croatia

- settlement
- Interactive map of Donji Okrug
- Location within Croatia
- Coordinates: 45°27′42″N 14°42′30″E
- Country: Croatia
- County: Primorje-Gorski Kotar
- City: Delnice

Area
  - Total: 0.7 km^{2} (0.27 sq mi)

Population (2021)
  - Total: 1
  - Density: 1.4/km^{2} (3.7/sq mi)
- Time zone: UTC+1 (CET)
  - Summer (DST): UTC+2 (CEST)
- Postal code: 51300 Delnice

Donji Okrug is a settlement in the City of Delnice in Croatia. In 2021, its population was 1.

== Demographics ==
Donji Okrug: Population trends 1857–2021
v

population	18	13	19	25	20	23	25	38	22	17	18	16	13	7	3	2	1
	1857	1869	1880	1890	1900	1910	1921	1931	1948	1953	1961	1971	1981	1991	2001	2011	2021

Sources: Croatian Bureau of Statistics publications
