= Mala Lešnica =

Settlement in Primorje-Gorski Kotar County, Croatia

Mala Lešnica Homer
- Settlement
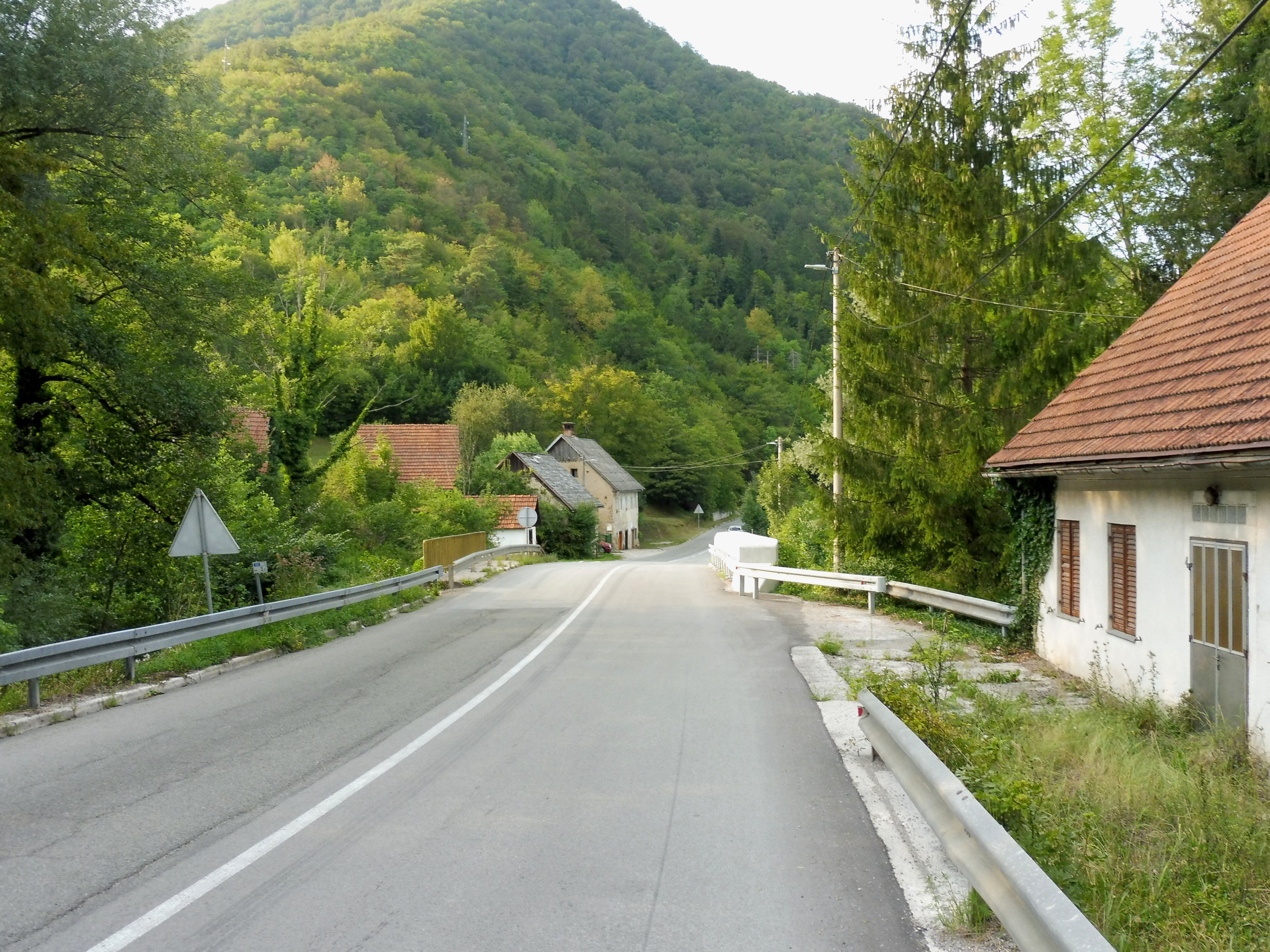
- Interactive map of Mala Lešnica
- Location of Mala Lešnica in Croatia
- Coordinates: 45°26′25″N 14°51′02″E
- Country: Croatia
- County: Primorje-Gorski Kotar
- City: Delnice

Area
  - Total: 0.4 km^{2} (0.15 sq mi)

Population (2021)
  - Total: 7
  - Density: 18/km^{2} (45/sq mi)
- Time zone: UTC+1 (CET)
  - Summer (DST): UTC+2 (CEST)
- Postal code: 51300 Delnice

Mala Lešnica is a settlement in the City of Delnice in Croatia. In 2021, its population was 7.

== Demographics ==
Mala Lešnica: Population trends 1857–2021
v

| population | 52 | 53 | 46 | 46 | 41 | 47 | 45 | 37 | 22 | 18 | 17 | 13 | 9 | 9 | 2 | 8 | 7 |
| | 1857 | 1869 | 1880 | 1890 | 1900 | 1910 | 1921 | 1931 | 1948 | 1953 | 1961 | 1971 | 1981 | 1991 | 2001 | 2011 | 2021 |

Sources: Croatian Bureau of Statistics publications

== Bibliography ==
=== History ===
- Sekulić, Ante (1982-12-21). "Brod na Kupi i njegova župa". Croatica Christiana periodica. 6 (6): 44–72. ISSN 0350-7823.
