= Zelin Crnoluški =

Settlement in Primorje-Gorski Kotar County, Croatia

- Settlement
- Interactive map of Zelin Crnoluški
- Location of Zelin Crnoluški in Croatia
- Coordinates: 45°23′35″N 14°41′00″E
- Country: Croatia
- County: Primorje-Gorski Kotar
- City: Delnice

Area
  - Total: 7.6 km^{2} (2.9 sq mi)

Population (2021)
  - Total: 0
  - Density: 0.0/km^{2} (0.0/sq mi)
- Time zone: UTC+1 (CET)
  - Summer (DST): UTC+2 (CEST)
- Postal code: 51300 Delnice

Zelin Crnoluški is a settlement in the City of Delnice in Croatia. In 2021, its population was 0.

== Demographics ==
Zelin Crnoluški: Population trends 1857–2021
v

population		23	48	52	64	59	53	64	39	30	17	19	10	6
	1857	1869	1880	1890	1900	1910	1921	1931	1948	1953	1961	1971	1981	1991	2001	2011	2021

Sources: Croatian Bureau of Statistics publications

== Sports ==
Beginning in 2013, the 7 stage 260 kilometres (160 mi) long Cycling Trail of Gorski Kotar (Croatian: Goranska biciklistička transverzala) passes by Zelin Crnoluški.
