= Guče Selo =

Settlement in Croatia

- settlement
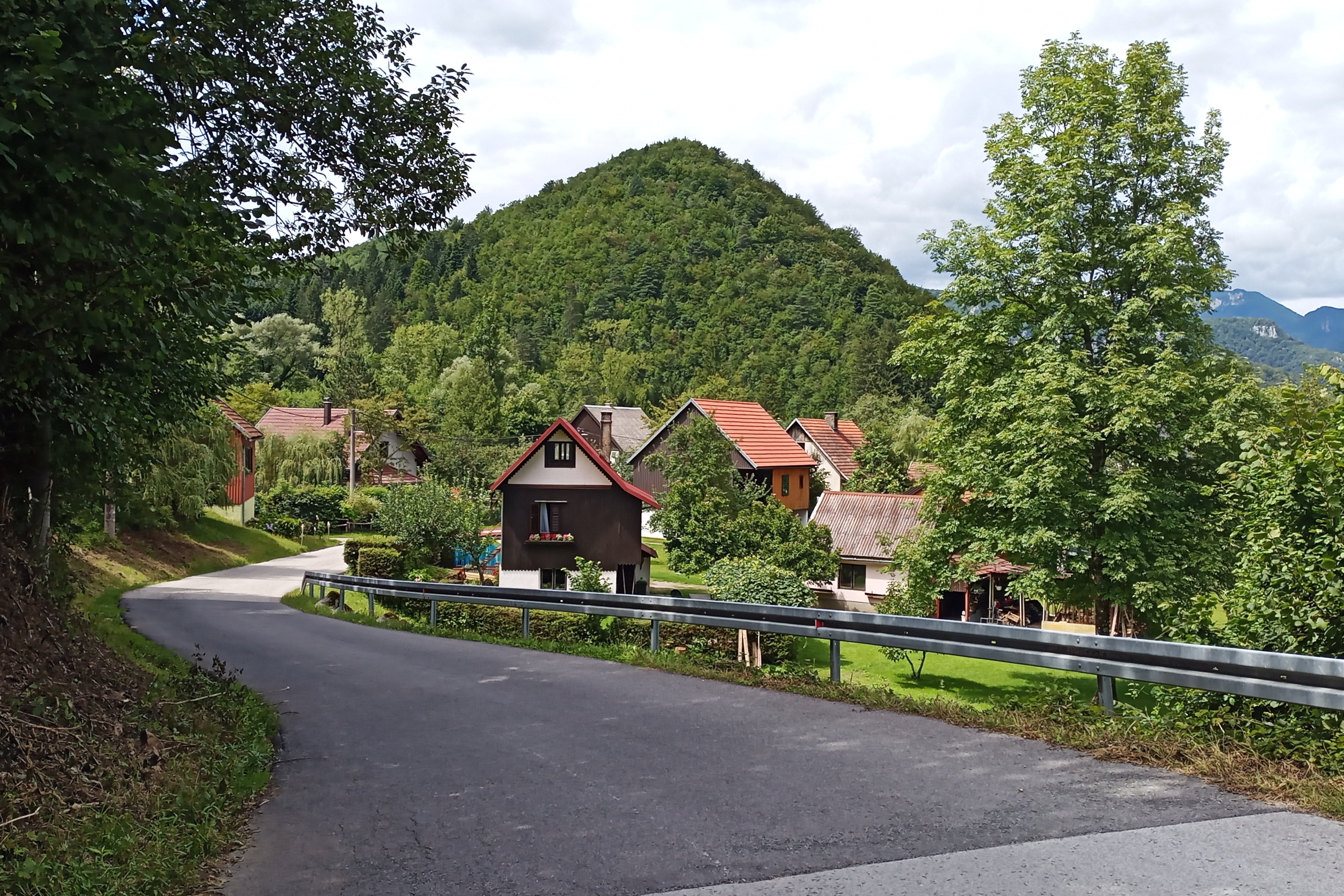
- Interactive map of Guče Selo
- Location within Croatia
- Coordinates: 45°27′54″N 14°48′43″E
- Country: Croatia
- County: Primorje-Gorski Kotar
- City: Delnice

Area
  - Total: 4.1 km^{2} (1.6 sq mi)

Population (2021)
  - Total: 19
  - Density: 4.6/km^{2} (12/sq mi)
- Time zone: UTC+1 (CET)
  - Summer (DST): UTC+2 (CEST)
- Postal code: 51300 Delnice

Guče Selo is a settlement in the City of Delnice in Croatia. In 2021, its population was 19.

== Demographics ==
Guče Selo: Population trends 1857–2021
v

population	107	108	119	146	128	145	99	124	102	90	78	63	52	56	44	27	19
	1857	1869	1880	1890	1900	1910	1921	1931	1948	1953	1961	1971	1981	1991	2001	2011	2021

Sources: Croatian Bureau of Statistics publications

== Sports ==
Beginning in 2013, the 7 stage 260 kilometres (160 mi) long Cycling Trail of Gorski Kotar (Croatian: Goranska biciklistička transverzala) passes through Kuželj.
