= Velika Voda =

Settlement in Primorje-Gorski Kotar County, Croatia

- Settlement
- Interactive map of Velika Voda
- Location of Velika Voda in Croatia
- Coordinates: 45°24′25″N 14°42′05″E
- Country: Croatia
- County: Primorje-Gorski Kotar
- City: Delnice

Area
  - Total: 2.5 km^{2} (0.97 sq mi)

Population (2021)
  - Total: 0
  - Density: 0.0/km^{2} (0.0/sq mi)
- Time zone: UTC+1 (CET)
  - Summer (DST): UTC+2 (CEST)
- Postal code: 51300 Delnice

Velika Voda is a settlement in the City of Delnice in Croatia. In 2021, its population was 0.

== Sports ==
Beginning in 2013, the 7 stage 260 kilometres (160 mi) long Cycling Trail of Gorski Kotar (Croatian: Goranska biciklistička transverzala) passes through Velika Voda.
