= Gašparci =

- Village
- Location within Croatia
- Coordinates: 45°30′22″N 14°46′51″E
- Country: Croatia
- County: Primorje-Gorski Kotar County
- Municipality: Delnice

Area
  - Total: 4.2 km^{2} (1.6 sq mi)

Population (2021)
  - Total: 11
  - Density: 2.6/km^{2} (6.8/sq mi)
- Time zone: UTC+1 (CET)
  - Summer (DST): UTC+2 (CEST)

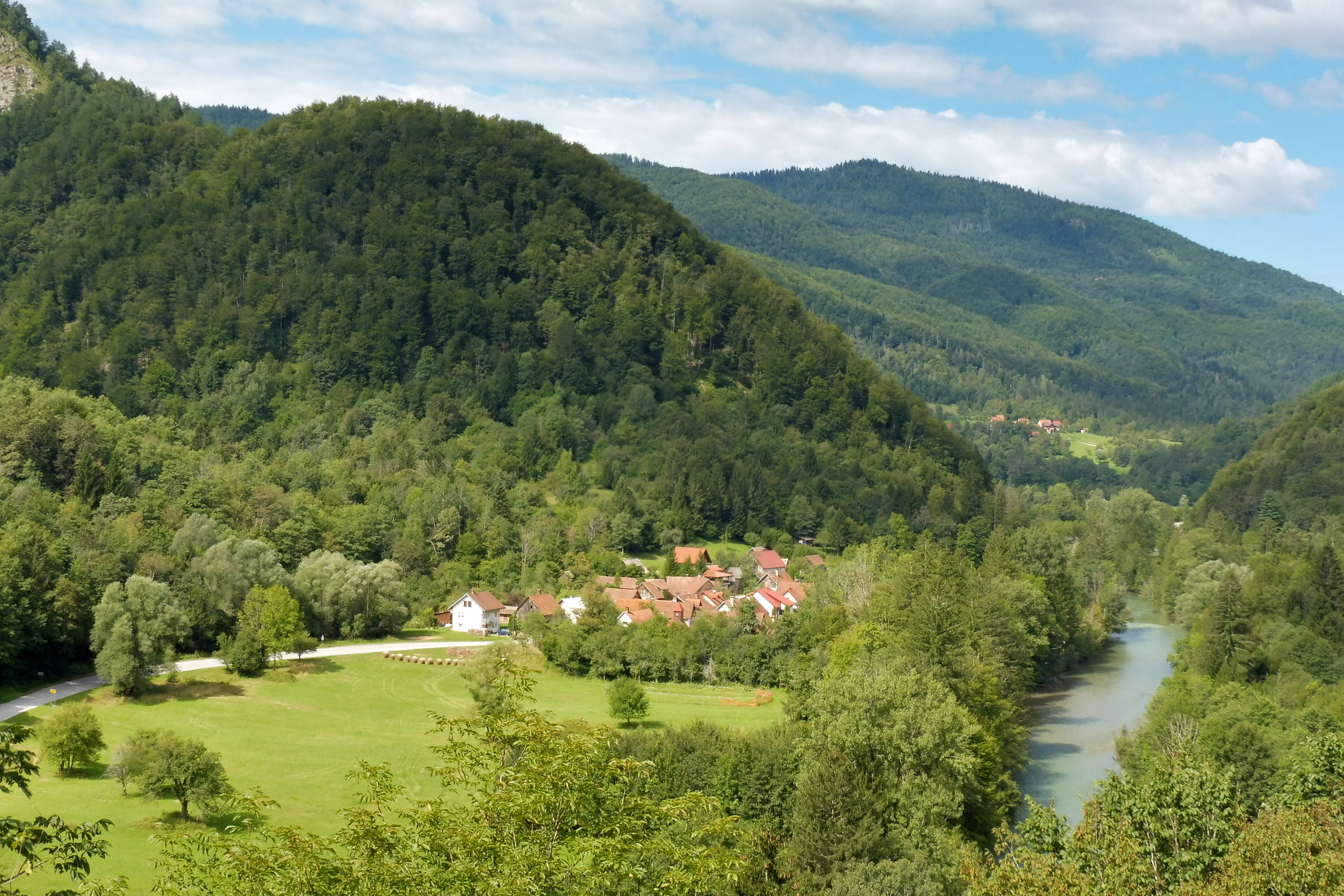
The village of Gašparci and the Kupa/Kolpa river

Gašparci is a village in Croatia, located on the border with Slovenia.

Beginning in 2013, the 7-stage, 260 kilometres (160 mi)-long cycling trail of Gorski Kotar (Croatian: Goranska biciklistička transverzala) passes through Gašparci.
