= Bela Vodica =

Settlement in Croatia

- settlement
- Interactive map of Bela Vodica
- Location within Croatia
- Coordinates: 45°25′07″N 14°41′29″E
- Country: Croatia
- County: Primorje-Gorski Kotar
- City: Delnice

Area
  - Total: 3.7 km^{2} (1.4 sq mi)

Population (2021)
  - Total: 28
  - Density: 7.6/km^{2} (20/sq mi)
- Time zone: UTC+1 (CET)
  - Summer (DST): UTC+2 (CEST)
- Postal code: 51300 Delnice
- Area code: +385 (0)1

Bela Vodica is a settlement in the City of Delnice in Croatia. In 2021, its population was 28.

== History ==
In the 1938–1939 season, Josip Majnarić of Bela Vodica replaced Vladimir Srok as caretaker of Šloserov Dom on Risnjak.

== Demographics ==
Bela Vodica: Population trends 1857–2021
v

population				31	14	19	27	15	41	32	27	27	37	30	31	24	28
	1857	1869	1880	1890	1900	1910	1921	1931	1948	1953	1961	1971	1981	1991	2001	2011	2021

Sources: Croatian Bureau of Statistics publications

== Economy ==
There was a sawmill in Bela Vodica.

== Sports ==
The "Gorski Kotar Bike Tour", held annually since 2012, sometimes goes through Bela Vodica, such as in the second leg for 2023, which started and ended in Bela Vodica.
