= Zakrajc Turkovski =

Settlement in Primorje-Gorski Kotar County, Croatia

Zakrajc Turkovski Zakrajac Turkovski
- Settlement
- Interactive map of Zakrajc Turkovski
- Location of Zakrajc Turkovski in Croatia
- Coordinates: 45°31′25″N 14°43′30″E
- Country: Croatia
- County: Primorje-Gorski Kotar
- City: Delnice

Area
  - Total: 1.7 km^{2} (0.66 sq mi)

Population (2021)
  - Total: 0
  - Density: 0.0/km^{2} (0.0/sq mi)
- Time zone: UTC+1 (CET)
  - Summer (DST): UTC+2 (CEST)
- Postal code: 51300 Delnice

Zakrajc Turkovski is a settlement in the City of Delnice in Croatia. In 2021, its population was 0.

== Demographics ==
Zakrajc Turkovski: Population trends 1857–2021
v

population	129	103	82	93	75	74	61	80	99	81	53	36	17	6	2	2
	1857	1869	1880	1890	1900	1910	1921	1931	1948	1953	1961	1971	1981	1991	2001	2011	2021

Sources: Croatian Bureau of Statistics publications
