= Gornja Krašićevica =

Settlement in Croatia

- settlement
- Interactive map of Gornja Krašićevica
- Location within Croatia
- Coordinates: 45°28′17″N 14°41′49″E
- Country: Croatia
- County: Primorje-Gorski Kotar
- City: Delnice

Area
  - Total: 0.4 km^{2} (0.15 sq mi)

Population (2021)
  - Total: 3
  - Density: 7.5/km^{2} (19/sq mi)
- Time zone: UTC+1 (CET)
  - Summer (DST): UTC+2 (CEST)
- Postal code: 51300 Delnice

Gornja Krašićevica is a settlement in the City of Delnice in Croatia. In 2021, its population was 3.

== Demographics ==
Gornja Krašićevica: Population trends 1857–2021
v

population	43	47	38	45	38	43	31	38	12	11	10	9	9	5	5	2	3
	1857	1869	1880	1890	1900	1910	1921	1931	1948	1953	1961	1971	1981	1991	2001	2011	2021

Sources: Croatian Bureau of Statistics publications
