= Donje Tihovo =

Settlement in Croatia

- settlement
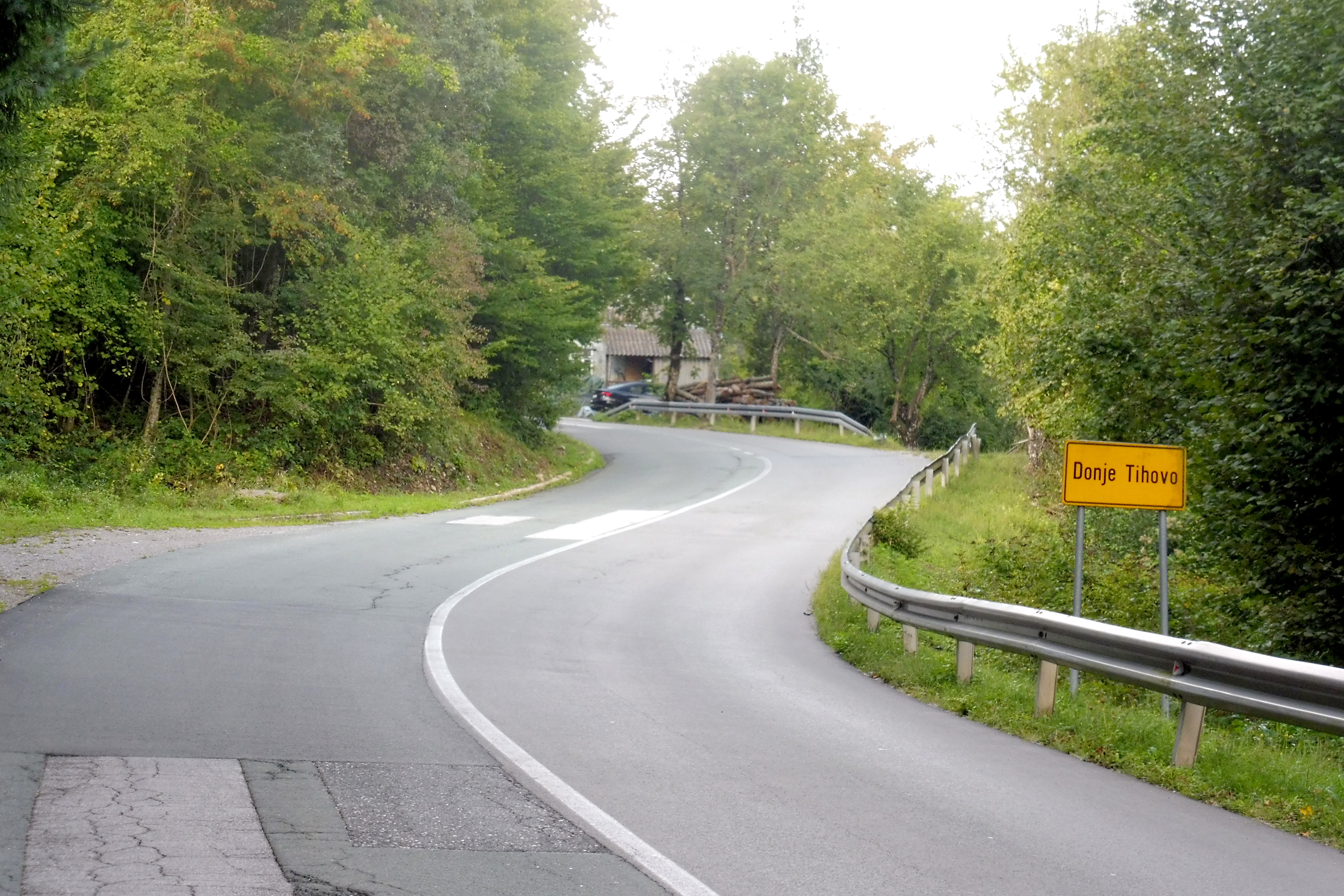
- Interactive map of Donje Tihovo
- Location within Croatia
- Coordinates: 45°25′59″N 14°50′47″E
- Country: Croatia
- County: Primorje-Gorski Kotar
- City: Delnice

Area
  - Total: 0.7 km^{2} (0.27 sq mi)

Population (2021)
  - Total: 4
  - Density: 5.7/km^{2} (15/sq mi)
- Time zone: UTC+1 (CET)
  - Summer (DST): UTC+2 (CEST)
- Postal code: 51300 Delnice

Donje Tihovo is a settlement in the City of Delnice in Croatia. In 2021, its population was 4.

== Demographics ==
Donje Tihovo: Population trends 1857–2021
v

population	27	49	33	36	38	37	32	39	20	20	21	13	11	11	8	5	4
	1857	1869	1880	1890	1900	1910	1921	1931	1948	1953	1961	1971	1981	1991	2001	2011	2021

Sources: Croatian Bureau of Statistics publications
