= Crnković family =

Croatian noble family

Crnković
- Country: Kingdom of Croatia (within Habsburg monarchy)
- Founder: Petar Crnković

The Crnković family is a Croatian noble family with its roots in the district of Gorski kotar.

== History ==
The first written document that mentions the name "Crnković" dates from 1429, from the village of Zavrsji in the county of Brod Moravice. The document is a church testimonial of the marriage between Petar Crnković (1411–1452) and Marija Borelli on 2/3 1429.

In 1635, Ivan Crnković (1611–1672), captain of the Frankopan Guard married Klara Frankopan (1618–1669), the daughter of Petar Dimitri Frankopan (brother of Fran Krsto Frankopan). The Frankopan dynasty, together with the Zrinski dynasty dominated Croatian history (they were the two most prominent families in Croatia from the 14th to the 17th century). In the year of 1636, Ivan Crnković was promoted to chief commandant of the Frankopan Guard and the Crnković family acquired lordship status. The first Crnković coat of arms dates from 1637.

In 1663, Fran Krsto Frankopan donated a fortified estate in the vicinity of Velike Lašče. This estate is in Crnković possession until 1798, when Petar Nikola Crnković (1752–1810) burned down his own estate as a supporting gesture towards the French Revolution.

Ivan Juraj Crnković (1748–1812), brother of Petar Nikola, moved 1779 to France, under the name Jean de Noir. Twelve years later most of his family were executed during the French Revolution. He escaped to Italy with his wife, under the name de Niro, but returned to France when Napoleon came to power. He died in the Napoleonic campaign on Russia. His French wife, Marie Louise de Noir (born de Toulange) moved to Croatia and lived in Zagreb until her death in 1845.

Antun Stjepan Crnković (1782–1848) (son of Petar Nikola Crnković), the chief commissar of Zagreb acquired the title of Count for the Crnković family from the emperor Francis II (for ending the uprising in Zagreb 1833). In 1842, the Crnković coat of arms was changed, designed in a national–romantic manner.

Ivan Stjepan Crnković(1785–1857) (son of Petar Nikola Crnković) was in 1815 the associate consul of the Habsburg monarchy in London. He married in 1820 Lady Mary of Selborne (the widow of Lord Thomas of Selborne (18th–19th century)). That branch of the Crnković family still exists in England.

The third son of Petar Nikola Crnković, Ivan Robespierre Crnković (1793–1847) bought an estate near the town of Delnice. This estate was in Crnković possession until 1945, when it was burned to the ground by partisan forces.

The son of Antun Stjepan Crnković, Tomislav Nikola Crnković (1810–1880) settled down on an estate near the town of Lokve. Today, there is still a number of Crnkovićs that live in the vicinity of Lokve near Delnice. There is also a Crnković cluster in the town of Đakovo. In the early 20th century, several Crnković moved to Canada, the United States and Zimbabwe. There are direct and indirect descendants registered under "Czernkovich","Crnkovich" or "Cinkovich" in United States and other parts of the world.

== Sources ==
- Gothaisches genealogisches Taschenbuch der freiherrlichen Haeuser auf das Jahr 1834, Seite 171-172;
- Adelslexikon, Band III G-Har, Jg. 1952, Seite 232
- Neues allgemeines deutsches Adels-lexicon, Ernst Heinrich Kneschke, 1863
- Genealogisches Handbuch des Adels Bd. 28 (1964) - Adelslexikon Bd. 2 S233.

== See also ==
- History of Croatia
