= Gornji Ložac =

Settlement in Croatia

- settlement
- Interactive map of Gornji Ložac
- Location within Croatia
- Coordinates: 45°31′28″N 14°44′14″E
- Country: Croatia
- County: Primorje-Gorski Kotar
- City: Delnice

Area
  - Total: 1.1 km^{2} (0.42 sq mi)

Population (2021)
  - Total: 5
  - Density: 4.5/km^{2} (12/sq mi)
- Time zone: UTC+1 (CET)
  - Summer (DST): UTC+2 (CEST)
- Postal code: 51300 Delnice

Gornji Ložac is a settlement in the City of Delnice in Croatia. In 2021, its population was 5.

== Demographics ==
Gornji Ložac: Population trends 1857–2021
v

population	31	38	28	20	29	32	22	34	42	32	21	17	18	11	13	10	5
	1857	1869	1880	1890	1900	1910	1921	1931	1948	1953	1961	1971	1981	1991	2001	2011	2021

Sources: Croatian Bureau of Statistics publications
