= Razloge =

Settlement in Primorje-Gorski Kotar County, Croatia

- Settlement
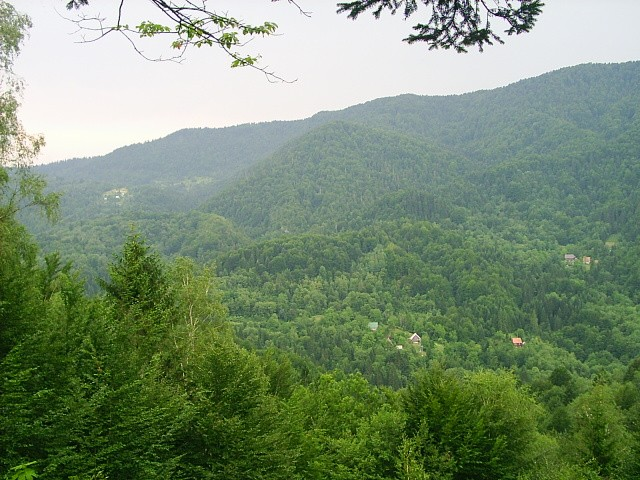
- Gorski kotar near Razloge church, Croatia
- Interactive map of Razloge
- Location of Razloge in Croatia
- Coordinates: 45°29′04″N 14°42′07″E
- Country: Croatia
- County: Primorje-Gorski Kotar
- City: Delnice

Area
  - Total: 5.9 km^{2} (2.3 sq mi)

Population (2021)
  - Total: 5
  - Density: 0.85/km^{2} (2.2/sq mi)
- Time zone: UTC+1 (CET)
  - Summer (DST): UTC+2 (CEST)
- Postal code: 51300 Delnice

Razloge is a settlement in the City of Delnice in Croatia. In 2021, its population was 5.

== History ==
A 22 December 1939 decision as part of agrarian reforms by Ban Šubašić to confiscate the local forest property of the Thurn and Taxis family, Kálmán Ghyczy and Nikola Petrović resulted in a legal dispute known as the Thurn and Taxis Affair, in part because of the relative status of the family and in part because of the proximity to the Italian border.

== Demographics ==
Razloge: Population trends 1857–2021
v

population	195	211	156	181	208	203	186	281	67	68	80	68	42	28	10	8	5
	1857	1869	1880	1890	1900	1910	1921	1931	1948	1953	1961	1971	1981	1991	2001	2011	2021

Sources: Croatian Bureau of Statistics publications

== Bibliography ==
- Prusac, Stjepan (2023-09-26) [defended 2023-09-25]. Posjedi obitelji Thurn Taxis nakon 1918. godine [Thurn Taxis Estates in Croatia after First World War] (Thesis) (in Croatian). Zagreb: Filozofski fakultet Sveučilišta u Zagrebu.
- Banska vlast Banovine Hrvatske (1940b). "Gospodarska prosvjeta i banovinska dobra". Godišnjak banske vlasti Banovine Hrvatske. Vol. 1. pp. 89–96.
