= Raskrižje Tihovo =

Settlement in Primorje-Gorski Kotar County, Croatia

- Settlement
- Interactive map of Raskrižje Tihovo
- Location of Raskrižje Tihovo in Croatia
- Coordinates: 45°25′26″N 14°49′34″E
- Country: Croatia
- County: Primorje-Gorski Kotar
- City: Delnice

Area
  - Total: 0.6 km^{2} (0.23 sq mi)

Population (2021)
  - Total: 3
  - Density: 5.0/km^{2} (13/sq mi)
- Time zone: UTC+1 (CET)
  - Summer (DST): UTC+2 (CEST)
- Postal code: 51300 Delnice

Raskrižje Tihovo is a settlement in the City of Delnice in Croatia. In 2021, its population was 3.

== Demographics ==
Raskrižje Tihovo: Population trends 1857–2021
v

population	57	62	56	50	61	67	79	57	52	49	39	25	15	16	5	7	3
	1857	1869	1880	1890	1900	1910	1921	1931	1948	1953	1961	1971	1981	1991	2001	2011	2021

Sources: Croatian Bureau of Statistics publications
