= Podgora Turkovska =

Settlement in Primorje-Gorski Kotar County, Croatia

- Settlement
- Interactive map of Podgora Turkovska
- Location of Podgora Turkovska in Croatia
- Coordinates: 45°30′57″N 14°43′24″E
- Country: Croatia
- County: Primorje-Gorski Kotar
- City: Delnice

Area
  - Total: 3.7 km^{2} (1.4 sq mi)

Population (2021)
  - Total: 3
  - Density: 0.81/km^{2} (2.1/sq mi)
- Time zone: UTC+1 (CET)
  - Summer (DST): UTC+2 (CEST)
- Postal code: 51300 Delnice

Podgora Turkovska is a settlement in the City of Delnice in Croatia. In 2021, its population was 3.

== Demographics ==
Podgora Turkovska: Population trends 1857–2021
v

population	114	123	101	113	81	109	82	93	71	72	77	56	36	13	10	8	3
	1857	1869	1880	1890	1900	1910	1921	1931	1948	1953	1961	1971	1981	1991	2001	2011	2021

Sources: Croatian Bureau of Statistics publications
