= Krivac =

Settlement in Croatia

- settlement
- Interactive map of Krivac
- Location within Croatia
- Coordinates: 45°27′22″N 14°51′13″E
- Country: Croatia
- County: Primorje-Gorski Kotar
- City: Delnice

Area
  - Total: 1.8 km^{2} (0.69 sq mi)

Population (2021)
  - Total: 18
  - Density: 10/km^{2} (26/sq mi)
- Time zone: UTC+1 (CET)
  - Summer (DST): UTC+2 (CEST)
- Postal code: 51300 Delnice

Krivac is a settlement in the City of Delnice in Croatia. In 2021, its population was 18.

== Demographics ==
Krivac: Population trends 1857–2021
v

| population | 123 | 99 | 75 | 82 | 60 | 72 | 64 | 58 | 58 | 66 | 61 | 54 | 52 | 44 | 28 | 23 | 18 |
| | 1857 | 1869 | 1880 | 1890 | 1900 | 1910 | 1921 | 1931 | 1948 | 1953 | 1961 | 1971 | 1981 | 1991 | 2001 | 2011 | 2021 |

Sources: Croatian Bureau of Statistics publications
