= Malo Selo, Croatia =

Settlement in Primorje-Gorski Kotar County, Croatia

Malo Selo
- Settlement
- Interactive map of Malo Selo
- Location of Malo Selo in Croatia
- Coordinates: 45°25′53″N 14°42′21″E
- Country: Croatia
- County: Primorje-Gorski Kotar
- City: Delnice

Area
  - Total: 22.5 km^{2} (8.7 sq mi)

Population (2021)
  - Total: 40
  - Density: 1.8/km^{2} (4.6/sq mi)
- Time zone: UTC+1 (CET)
  - Summer (DST): UTC+2 (CEST)
- Postal code: 51300 Delnice

Malo Selo is a settlement in the City of Delnice in Croatia. In 2021, its population was 40.

== Demographics ==
Malo Selo: Population trends 1857–2021
v

population	231	225	214	308	257	229	202	182	156	189	173	134	112	104	79	62	40
	1857	1869	1880	1890	1900	1910	1921	1931	1948	1953	1961	1971	1981	1991	2001	2011	2021

Sources: Croatian Bureau of Statistics publications

== Sports ==
Beginning in 2013, the 7 stage 260 kilometres (160 mi) long Cycling Trail of Gorski Kotar (Croatian: Goranska biciklistička transverzala) passes through Malo Selo.
