= Ševalj =

Settlement in Primorje-Gorski Kotar County, Croatia

- Settlement
- Interactive map of Ševalj
- Location of Ševalj in Croatia
- Coordinates: 45°27′59″N 14°48′16″E
- Country: Croatia
- County: Primorje-Gorski Kotar
- City: Delnice

Area
  - Total: 0.6 km^{2} (0.23 sq mi)

Population (2021)
  - Total: 1
  - Density: 1.7/km^{2} (4.3/sq mi)
- Time zone: UTC+1 (CET)
  - Summer (DST): UTC+2 (CEST)
- Postal code: 51300 Delnice

Ševalj is a settlement in the City of Delnice in Croatia. In 2021, its population was 1.

== Demographics ==
Ševalj: Population trends 1857–2021
v

population	31	32	29	37	25	29	22	24	33	20	21	14	10	10	3		1
	1857	1869	1880	1890	1900	1910	1921	1931	1948	1953	1961	1971	1981	1991	2001	2011	2021

Sources: Croatian Bureau of Statistics publications
