= Vele Mune =

- Location of Vele Mune in Croatia
- Coordinates: 45°27′33″N 14°09′59″E
- Country: Croatia
- County: Primorje-Gorski Kotar County
- Municipality: Matulji

Area
  - Total: 17.3 km^{2} (6.7 sq mi)
- Elevation: 642 m (2,106 ft)

Population (2021)
  - Total: 119
  - Density: 6.88/km^{2} (17.8/sq mi)
- Time zone: UTC+1 (CET)
  - Summer (DST): UTC+2 (CEST)
- Postal code: 51212

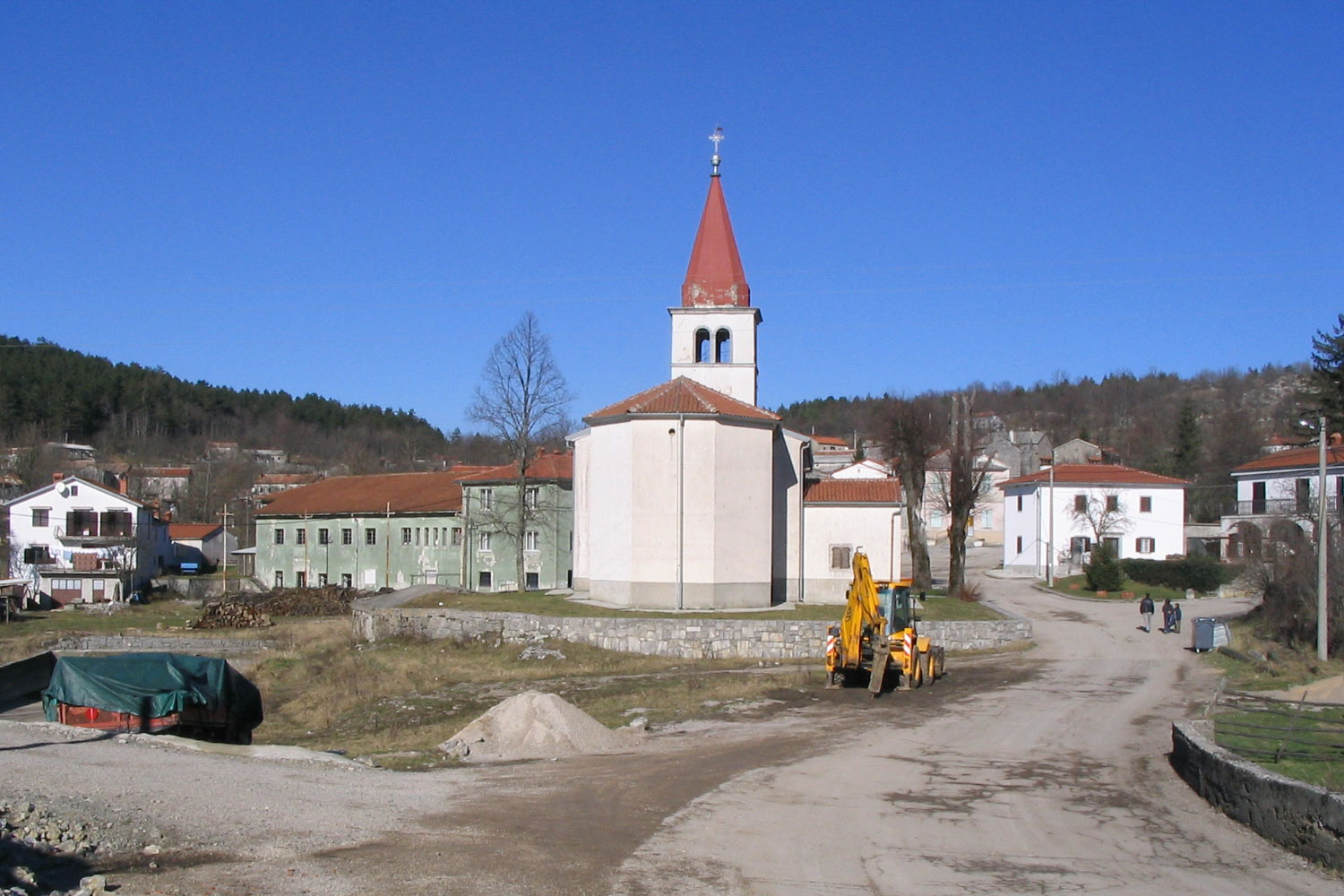
The village of Vele Mune, Croatia

Vele Mune (Italian: Mune Grande) is a village in the Primorje-Gorski Kotar County, in the western part of Croatia. Administratively it belongs to the municipality of Matulji.

== Population ==
Population number according to the census
1857	1869	1880	1890	1900	1910	1921	1931	1948	1953	1961	1971	1981	1991	2001	2011
647	733	751	728	770	714	699	587	405	375	276	294	159	150	133	122

== See also ==
- Male Mune
