= Male Mune =

- Location of Male Mune in Croatia
- Coordinates: 45°27′31″N 14°09′24″E
- Country: Croatia
- County: Primorje-Gorski Kotar County
- Municipality: Matulji

Area
  - Total: 17.7 km^{2} (6.8 sq mi)
- Elevation: 651 m (2,136 ft)

Population (2021)
  - Total: 101
  - Density: 5.71/km^{2} (14.8/sq mi)
- Time zone: UTC+1 (CET)
  - Summer (DST): UTC+2 (CEST)
- Postal code: 51212

Male Mune (Italian: Mune Piccolo) is a village in Primorje-Gorski Kotar County, in the western part of Croatia. Administratively, it belongs to the municipality of Matulji.

== Population ==
Population number according to the census
1857	1869	1880	1890	1900	1910	1921	1931	1948	1953	1961	1971	1981	1991	2001	2011
462	513	483	504	529	497	515	460	418	359	276	238	180	123	131	103

== See also ==
- Vele Mune
