= Zapolje Brodsko =

Settlement in Primorje-Gorski Kotar County, Croatia

- Settlement
- Interactive map of Zapolje Brodsko
- Location of Zapolje Brodsko in Croatia
- Coordinates: 45°27′39″N 14°50′21″E
- Country: Croatia
- County: Primorje-Gorski Kotar
- City: Delnice

Area
  - Total: 0.2 km^{2} (0.077 sq mi)

Population (2021)
  - Total: 12
  - Density: 60/km^{2} (160/sq mi)
- Time zone: UTC+1 (CET)
  - Summer (DST): UTC+2 (CEST)
- Postal code: 51300 Delnice

Zapolje Brodsko is a settlement in the City of Delnice in Croatia. In 2021, its population was 12.

== Demographics ==
Zapolje Brodsko: Population trends 1857–2021
v

population								19	27	13	29	22	42	77	29	34	12
	1857	1869	1880	1890	1900	1910	1921	1931	1948	1953	1961	1971	1981	1991	2001	2011	2021

Sources: Croatian Bureau of Statistics publications
