= Zagolik =

- Village
- Location within Croatia
- Coordinates: 45°29′N 14°47′E
- Country: Croatia

Area
  - Total: 2.9 km^{2} (1.1 sq mi)

Population (2021)
  - Total: 1
  - Density: 0.34/km^{2} (0.89/sq mi)
- Time zone: UTC+1 (CET)
  - Summer (DST): UTC+2 (CEST)

Zagolik is an uninhabited settlement in Croatia.
