= Crni Lug, Vranje =

Village in Serbia

Crni Lug Александровац (Serbian)
- Village (Selo)
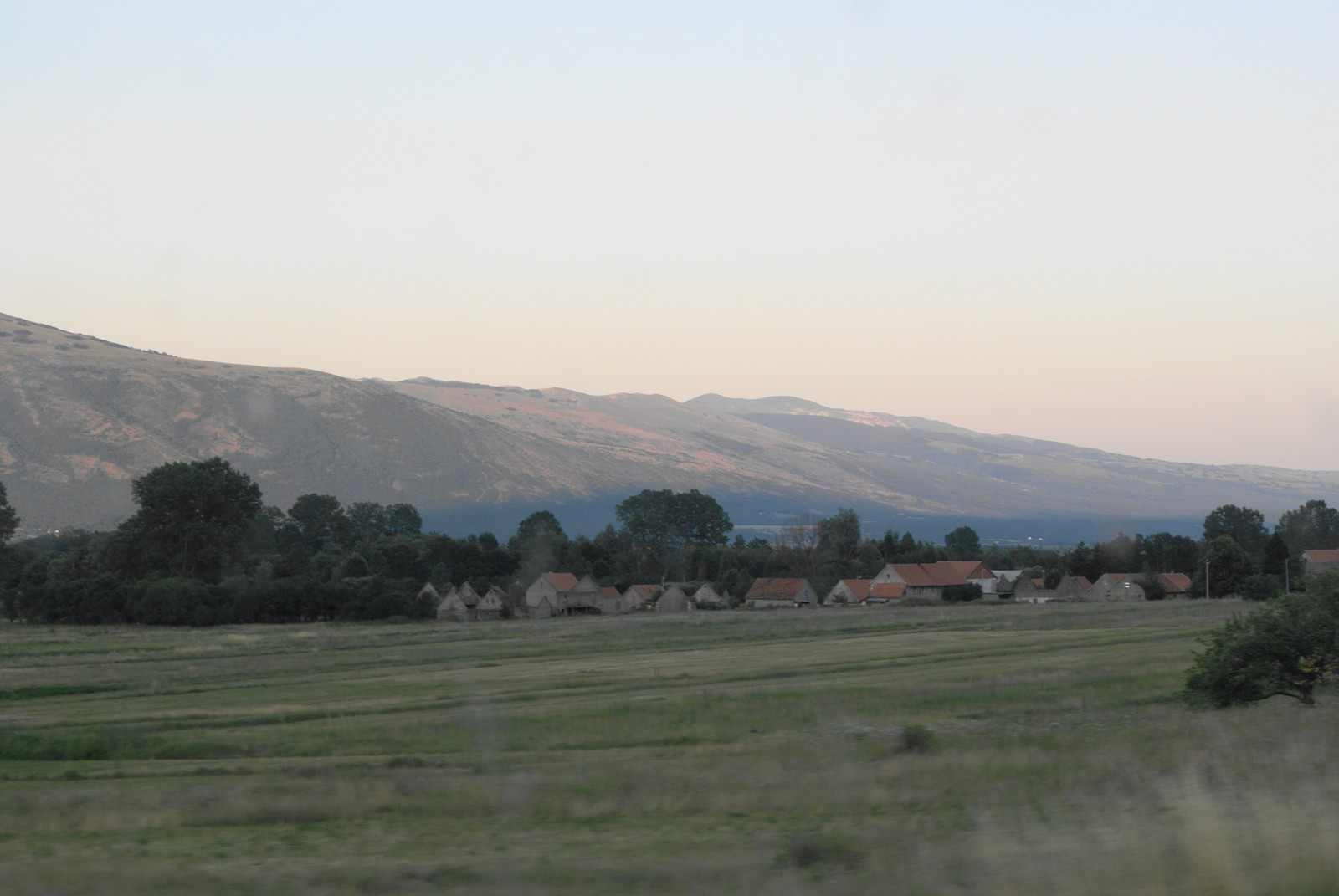
- Crni Lug, Vranje

- Location within Serbia
- Country: Serbia
- Region: Southern and Eastern Serbia
- District: Pčinja
- Municipality: Vranje

Population (2011)
  - Total: 249
- Time zone: UTC+1 (CET)
  - Summer (DST): UTC+2 (CEST)

Crni Lug (Serbian Cyrillic: Црни Луг) is a Serbian village situated in Vranje, Pčinja District. As of 2011, it had a population of 249.
