= Gornji Suhor pri Metliki =

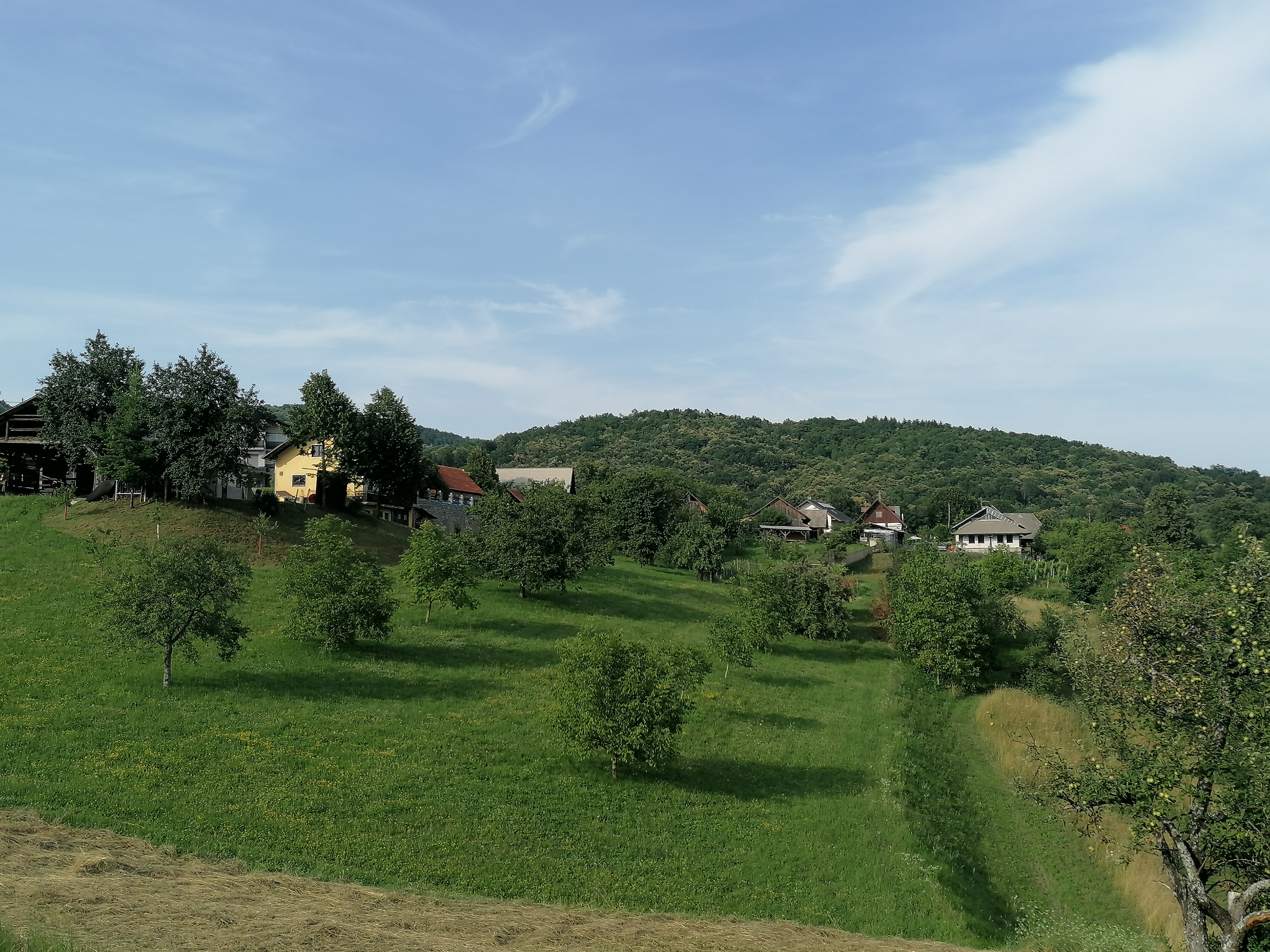

- Location in Slovenia
- Coordinates: 45°41′34.56″N 15°16′22.24″E
- Country: Slovenia
- Traditional region: White Carniola
- Statistical region: Southeast Slovenia
- Municipality: Metlika

Area
  - Total: 1.37 km^{2} (0.53 sq mi)
- Elevation: 375.6 m (1,232 ft)

Population (2002)
  - Total: 90
- Postal code: 8331

Gornji Suhor pri Metliki (pronounced [ˈɡoːɾnji ˈsuːxɔɾ pɾi mɛˈtliːki]; German: Obersuchor bei Möttling) is a settlement in the Municipality of Metlika in the White Carniola area of southeastern Slovenia, right on the border with Croatia. The entire area is part of the traditional region of Lower Carniola and is now included in the Southeast Slovenia Statistical Region.

== Name ==
The name of the settlement was changed from Gornji Suhor to Gornji Suhor pri Metliki in 1953. The name literally means 'upper Suhor near Metlike', distinguishing the settlement from neighboring Dolnji Suhor pri Metliki (literally, 'lower Suhor near Metlike'). The settlement was attested in written sources in 1477 as Suchar (and as Gornÿ Zwhor in 1593, and Ober Süchor in 1610). The name Suhor is derived from the adjective suh 'dry'. This most likely refers to a dry creek rather than reference to a hypocorism. The settlement was known as Obersuchor bei Möttling in German in the past.

== History ==
In 1610, the village had eight farms and it belonged to the Dominion of Metlika. During the Second World War, after the Italian base in Dolnji Suhor pri Metliki was destroyed, the Partisans set up a regional committee and a shoe-making workshop in Gornji Suhor pri Metliki because of its more secluded location. The commands of various Partisan units also bivouacked in the settlement. Water mains were installed in the village in 1956.
