= Risnjak =

Mountain in Gorski Kotar, Croatia

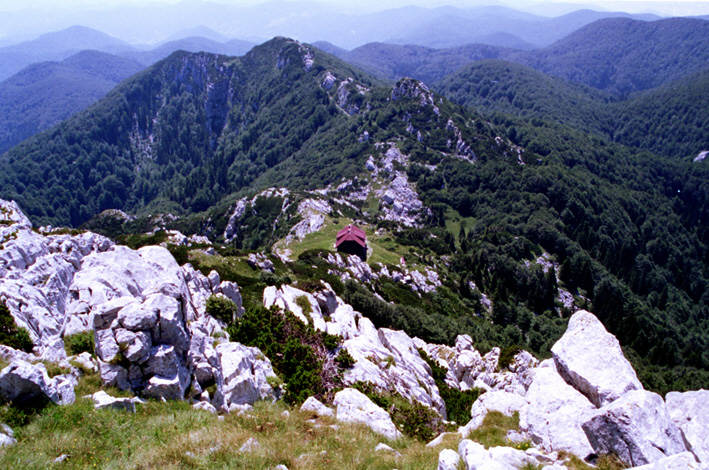
- View at the Schlosser lodge from Veliki Risnjak

Highest point
- Elevation: 1,528 m (5,013 ft)
- Coordinates: 45°25′42″N 14°44′42″E

Geography
- Location within Croatia
- Location: Gorski kotar, Croatia
- Parent range: Dinaric Alps

Climbing
- Easiest route: from Gornje Jelenje (about 1 hour)

Risnjak is a mountain in the Risnjak National Park, in Gorski Kotar, Croatia. It belongs to the Dinaric Alps mountain range. The name of the massif probably comes from ris, the Croatian word for lynx. Another interpretation suggests that it comes from the local word risje, which is a name for a type of grass.

The vegetation is very diverse. Thirty different plant communities have been recorded, of which the most common are beech and fir forests (Fagetum illyricum abietotosum) which go up to 1240 m and then are replaced by sub-alpine beeches (Fagetum croaticum subalpinum). The highest vegetation is a belt of mountain pine (Pinetum mughi croaticum). The fauna is also diverse, but has been less well researched. There are particularly many species of birds and mammals, including several types of chamois, while since 1974 the area has once again been inhabited by the ris (lynx).

The highest peak of Risnjak mountain is "Risnjak" or Veliki Risnjak at 1528 m.a.s.l. (the latter name means "Big Risnjak"), and it is also the highest peak in the Risnjak National Park, and the second in Gorski kotar next to Bjelolasica. On its southern slope is located the mountain lodge called Šloserov dom, built by Josip Schlosser. The peak can be reached only on foot, from Crni Lug (3 h) or from an unpaved road beginning in Gornje Jelenje (1 h).

The highest peaks of Risnjak mountain are: Veliki Risnjak (1528 m), Sjeverni Mali Risnjak (1434 m) and Južni Mali Risnjak (1448 m).

== History ==
On 9 July 1899, a new trail to Mali Risnjak by alpinist Moravec was completed.

== Mountain huts ==
In the 1935–1936 season, the Šloserov dom mountain hut at 1,420 metres (4,660 ft) in elevation, open year round, saw 738 visitors, including 2 Italian, 2 German and 1 Romanian citizen. It was renovated from August to October 1935. In the 1936–1937 season, when caretaker Malnar was retired and replaced with its former caretaker Vladimir Srok, it saw 751 visitors, including 10 Italian, 3 German, 1 Austrian and 1 French citizens. In the 1937–1938 season, under Srok, it saw 538 visitors, including 1 French citizen. In the 1938–1939 season, with Josip Majnarić of Bela Vodica replacing Srok, it saw 519 visitors, including 14 Bulgarian and 1 Czechoslovak citizens. It saw 357 visitors in the 1939–1940 season. Renovations were carried out by master Janež of Gerovo from July to October 1940, while Danica Šapić took over from Majnarić as caretaker.

== See also ==
- Risnjak National Park
- List of mountains in Croatia

== Bibliography ==
=== General ===
- Leksikografski zavod Miroslav Krleža (2013–2024). "Risnjak". Hrvatska enciklopedija (online ed.). Archived from the original on 2023-12-28.

=== Biology ===
- Šašić, Martina; Nahirnić, Ana; Tarmann, Gerhard M. (2016-12-31). "Zygaenidae (Lepidoptera) in the Lepidoptera collections of the Croatian Natural History Museum". Natura Croatica: Periodicum Musei Historiae Naturalis Croatici. 25 (2): 233–248. doi:10.20302/NC.2016.25.19. eISSN 1848-7386.

=== Tourism ===
- Hirc, Dragutin (1898) [written 1898-02-08]. "Risnjak i Mrzla vodica". Gorski kotar: slike, opisi i putopisi. Illustrated by Václav Lev Anderle. Zagreb: 🖶 Lavoslav Hartman (Kugli i Deutsch). pp. 30–48. Republished as Hirc, Dragutin (1993) [written 1898-02-08]. "Risnjak i Mrzla vodica". Gorski kotar: slike, opisi i putopisi. Illustrated by Václav Lev Anderle. Rijeka: 🖶 Tiskara Rijeka. pp. 30–48. ISBN 953-158-004-9.

=== Alpinism ===
- Poljak, Željko (February 1959). "Risnjak i Snježnik". Kazalo za "Hrvatski planinar" i "Naše planine" 1898—1958 (PDF). Naše planine. Vol. XI. pp. 10–11. ISSN 0354-0650.
