= Požar, Croatia =

Settlement in Primorje-Gorski Kotar County, Croatia

Požar
- Settlement
- Interactive map of Požar
- Location of Požar in Croatia
- Coordinates: 45°30′44″N 14°43′49″E
- Country: Croatia
- County: Primorje-Gorski Kotar
- City: Delnice

Area
  - Total: 1.7 km^{2} (0.66 sq mi)

Population (2021)
  - Total: 4
  - Density: 2.4/km^{2} (6.1/sq mi)
- Time zone: UTC+1 (CET)
  - Summer (DST): UTC+2 (CEST)
- Postal code: 51300 Delnice

Požar is a settlement in the City of Delnice in Croatia. In 2021, its population was 4.

== Demographics ==
Požar: Population trends 1857–2021
v

population	148	156	96	111	87	117	96	86	107	104	94	56	53	23	17	8	4
	1857	1869	1880	1890	1900	1910	1921	1931	1948	1953	1961	1971	1981	1991	2001	2011	2021

Sources: Croatian Bureau of Statistics publications
