= Crni Lug, Croatia =

Crni Lug
- Village
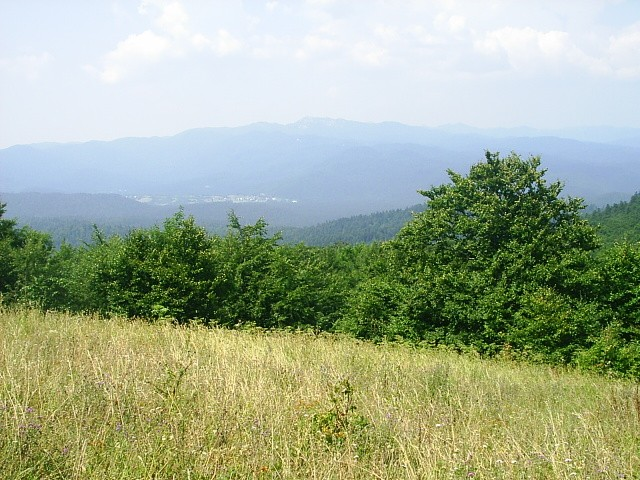
- Risnjak and Crni Lug hills seen from Veliki Drgomalj, Croatia
- Interactive map of Crni Lug
- Coordinates: 45°25′07″N 14°42′18″E
- Country: Croatia
- County: Primorje-Gorski Kotar County
- Town: Delnice

Area
  - Total: 9.6 km^{2} (3.7 sq mi)

Population (2021)
  - Total: 209
  - Density: 22/km^{2} (56/sq mi)
- Time zone: UTC+1 (CET)
  - Summer (DST): UTC+2 (CEST)

Crni Lug is a village in Primorje-Gorski Kotar County in Croatia, on the territory of the city of Delnice. It is connected by the D32 highway.

== History ==
Crni Lug was and is a common starting point for the ascent of Veliki Risnjak. Around the turn of the century, two local inns competed for alpinists. That of Mije Štimac was noted to be more expensive than that of Mate Tijan.

=== Kingdom of Yugoslavia ===
A 22 December 1939 decision as part of agrarian reforms by Ban Šubašić to confiscate the local forest property of the Thurn and Taxis family, Kálmán Ghyczy and Nikola Petrović resulted in a legal dispute known as the Thurn and Taxis Affair, in part because of the relative status of the family and in part because of the proximity to the Italian border.

=== WWII ===
At the behest of Dušan Rašković, Franjo Čurin parish priest of Crni Lug and others gathered in Delnice signed a document recognising the JNOF on 21 February 1945, selecting a delegation to represent the priesthood before their authority.

=== Recent ===
Crni Lug was hit by the 2014 Dinaric ice storm. From 31 January to 2 February, while S and SW geostrophic wind dominated, freezing rain fell on Gorski Kotar, glazing the entire region. It wrecked roofs, power lines an forests, causing power loss for about 14,000 households in Gorski Kotar, or about 80% of its population. It took about 10 days to restore essential infrastructure to the region, and within months electricity was back in most of its former range, but at a cost of about 84.4 million HRK to HEP. At the time it was the largest peacetime damage since its Secession from Yugoslavia, even without counting the forestry losses. The Šumarija Crni Lug lost 48% of its wood mass. Clearing blocked forestry roads and forest paths would take years, and thanks to the declining population some were never cleared.

On 12 December 2017, a severe wind hit the area, blocking traffic along the Ž5032 road.

== Climate ==
Since records began in 2003, the highest temperature recorded at the local weather station was 35.0 °C (95.0 °F), on 22 August 2011. The coldest temperature was −27.0 °C (−16.6 °F), on both 10 February and 3 March 2005.

== Demographics ==
In 1895, the obćina of Crni Lug (court at Crni Lug), with an area of 59 square kilometres (23 mi^{2}), belonged to the kotar of Delnice (Delnice court and electoral district) in the županija of Modruš-Rieka (Ogulin court and financial board). There were 151 houses, with a population of 966 (the lowest in Delnice kotar). Its 5 villages and 3 hamlets were encompassed for taxation purposes by a single porezna obćina, under the Delnice office.

Town of Crni Lug: Population trends 1857–2021
v

population	534	602	570	535	529	483	443	481	474	493	457	377	342	322	291	253	209
	1857	1869	1880	1890	1900	1910	1921	1931	1948	1953	1961	1971	1981	1991	2001	2011	2021

Note:Includes Bela Vodica and Leska from 1857 to 1880. Includes Šibrlička from 1857 to 1948. Sources: Croatian Bureau of Statistics publications

=== National ===
At the 1920 Kingdom of Serbs, Croats and Slovenes Constitutional Assembly election in Modruš-Rijeka County, Crni Lug voted mainly for the Agrarian Party, the Croatian Union and the Communist Party.

Results at the poll in Crni Lug
Year	Voters	Electors	NRS	DSD	KPJ	HPSS	Independent	SS	HSP	HZ
1920	189	142	3	9	20	9	8	49	7	37

== Sports ==
Beginning in 2013, the 7 stage 260 kilometres (160 mi) long Cycling Trail of Gorski Kotar (Croatian: Goranska biciklistička transverzala) passes through Crni Lug, where the fifth stage ends and the sixth stage begins.

== Notable people ==
- Jakov Crnković, Seljački savez candidate for Skupština representative in the 1920 election

== Bibliography ==
- OONF PGO (1945-03-19). "Svećenstvo Gorskog Kotara pristupa JNOf-i". Primorski vjesnik: Glasilo jedinstvene Narodno-oslobodilačke fronte Hrvatskog primorja (in Serbo-Croatian). No. 144. p. 4.
