= Tuk =

Tuk or TUK may refer to:

== Places ==
=== Croatia ===
- Tuk, Bjelovar-Bilogora County, a village near Rovišće
- Tuk, Vrbovsko, a village near Vrbovsko, Primorje-Gorski Kotar County
- Tuk Vojni, a village near Mrkopalj, Primorje-Gorski Kotar County
- Tuk Mrkopaljski, a village near Mrkopalj

=== Other countries ===
- Tuk, Netherlands, a village
- Tuktoyaktuk, commonly known as Tuk, a hamlet in the Northwest Territories, Canada
- Turkmenistan (UNDP country code)

== Other uses ==
- Turbat International Airport (IATA code), Balochistan, Pakistan
- Turkmen language (ISO 639-2 code)
- Tuk band, a kind of Barbadian musical ensemble that plays tuk music
- Liev Tuk (fl. 1960s–1970s), Cambodian singer
- Tuk Jakova (1914–1959), Albanian politician
- Tuk, fictional character from the Avatar franchise

== See also ==
- Tuk Tuk, a motorized rickshaw
- Tuck (disambiguation)
- Tuks (disambiguation)
