= Brestova Draga =

- Interactive map of Brestova Draga
- Location within Croatia
- Coordinates: 45°19′28″N 14°47′32″E
- Country: Croatia
- County: Primorje-Gorski Kotar
- Municipality: Mrkopalj

Area
  - Total: 9.6 km^{2} (3.7 sq mi)

Population (2021)
  - Total: 47
  - Density: 4.9/km^{2} (13/sq mi)
- Time zone: UTC+1 (CET)
  - Summer (DST): UTC+2 (CEST)
- Postal code: 51300 Delnice
- Area code: +385 51

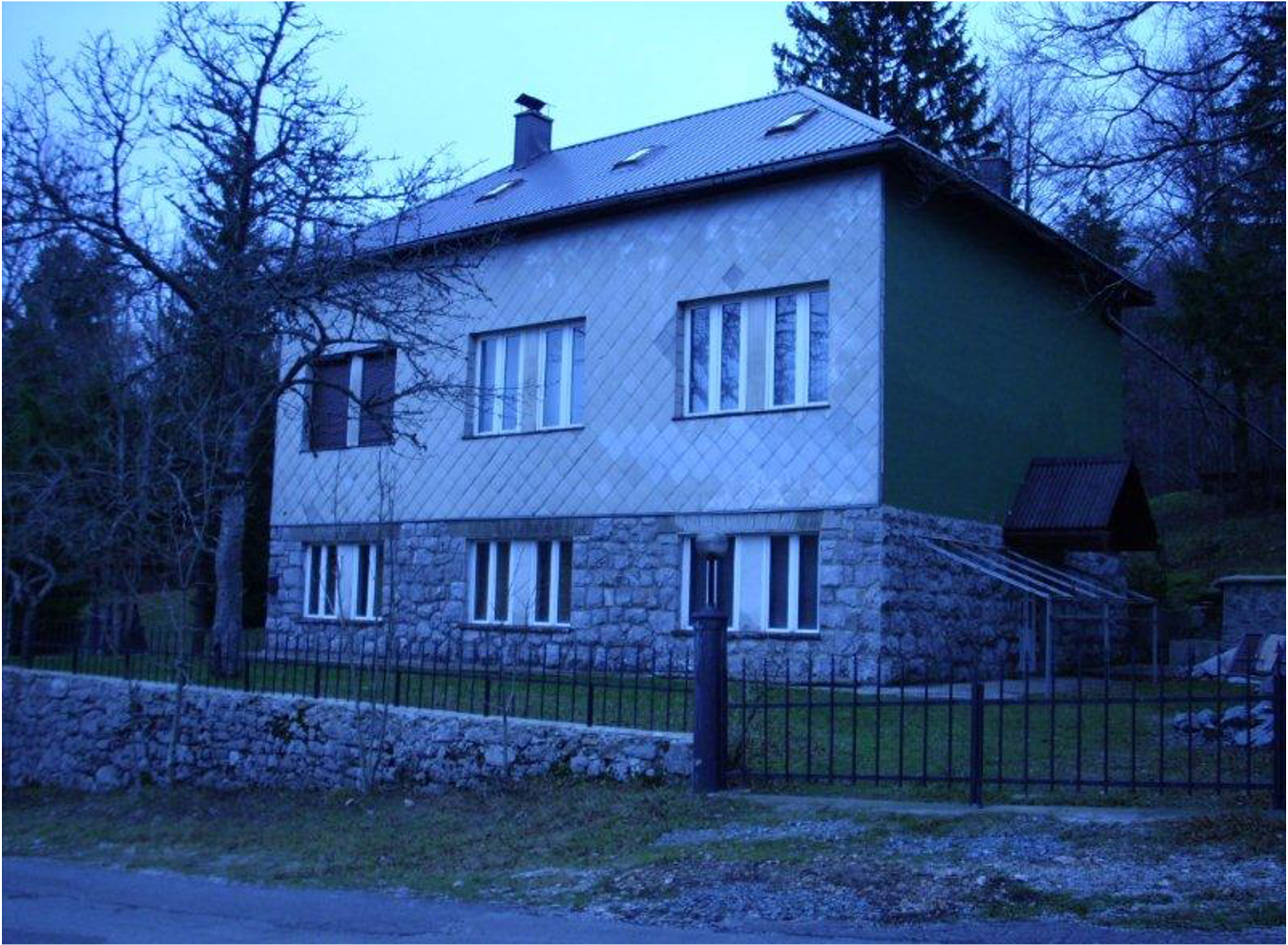
School in Brestova Draga

Brestova Draga is a village in Mrkopalj municipality, Primorje-Gorski Kotar County, in western Croatia. According to the 2021 census, it has a population of 47.

== Geography ==
Situated in the mountainous and forested Gorski Kotar region, nearby natural attractions include the Risnjak National Park and Park šuma Golubinjak.

== History ==
Previous to the territorial reorganization of the Treaty of Trianon in 1920, Brestova Draga was administratively a part of the Delnice municipality of Modruš-Rijeka County.

== Demographics ==
Brestova Draga: Population trends 1857–2021
v

population	197	167	158	171	200	198	167	225	166	166	163	120	94	79	55	53	47
	1857	1869	1880	1890	1900	1910	1921	1931	1948	1953	1961	1971	1981	1991	2001	2011	2021

Sources: Croatian Bureau of Statistics publications

== Sports ==
Beginning in 2013, the 7 stage 260 kilometres (160 mi) long Cycling Trail of Gorski Kotar (Croatian: Goranska biciklistička transverzala) passes through Brestova Draga.

The "Gorski Kotar Bike Tour", held annually since 2012, sometimes goes through Brestova Draga, such as in the first leg for 2023.
