= Begovo Razdolje =

- Interactive map of Begovo Razdolje
- Location within Croatia
- Coordinates: 45°18′19″N 14°54′5″E
- Country: Croatia
- County: Primorje-Gorski Kotar
- Municipality: Mrkopalj

Area
  - Total: 52.2 km^{2} (20.2 sq mi)
- Elevation: 1,060 m (3,480 ft)

Population (2021)
  - Total: 36
  - Density: 0.69/km^{2} (1.8/sq mi)
- Time zone: UTC+1 (CET)
  - Summer (DST): UTC+2 (CEST)

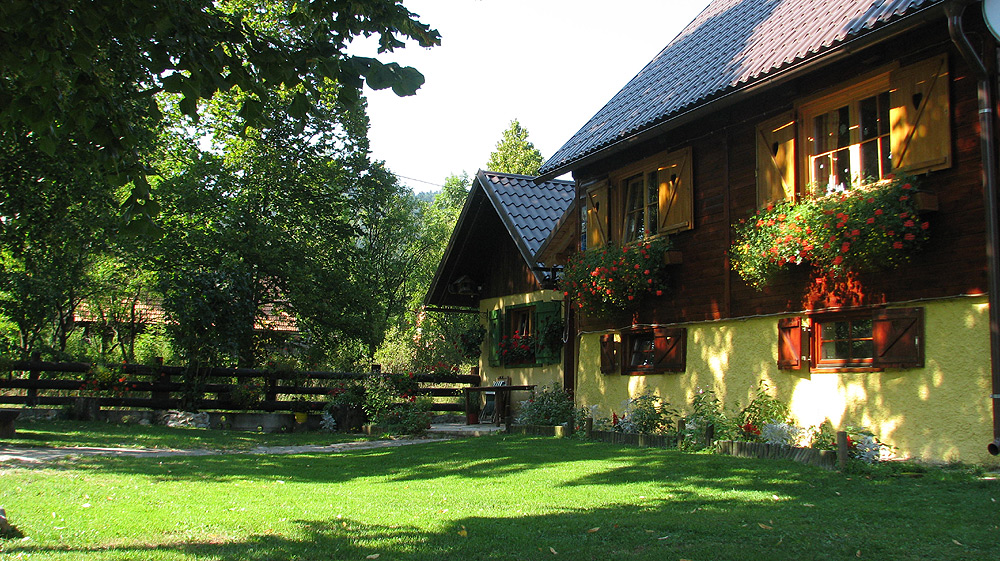
Courtyard

Begovo Razdolje (Croatian pronunciation: [bɛ̂ɡɔʋɔ rǎːzdɔːʎɛ]) is a village in Mrkopalj municipality, Primorje-Gorski Kotar County, in western Croatia. At 1,060 m (3,478 ft), it is the settlement with the highest elevation in Croatia.

Begovo Razdolje has a population of 48 (as of 2011), mostly elderly people. The villagers, traditionally oriented towards forestry and hunting, are increasingly turning to livestock farming and tourism in recent decades.

== History ==
On 30 November 2011, 36 centimetres (14 in) of snow fell in 12 hours.

On 8 December 2012, 63 centimetres (25 in) of snow fell in 24 hours for a cumulative depth of 118 centimetres (46 in). On 14 January 2013, 58 centimetres (23 in) of snow fell in 24 hours. On 23 February, 30 centimetres (12 in) of snow fell in 48 hours for a cumulative depth of 195 centimetres (77 in).

On 9 February 2015, 155 centimetres (61 in) of snow fell in 12 hours in Begovo Razdolje.

== Climate ==
Between 2003 and 2008, the highest temperature recorded at the local weather station was 30.0 °C (86.0 °F), on 26 June 2006. The coldest temperature was −24.7 °C (−12.5 °F), on 8 February 2005.

== Attractions ==
The 37,800 square metres (407,000 ft^{2}) park of Matić-poljana nearby was designed by Zdenko Sila in 1969 in memory of the 13th Partisan Division.

== Sports ==
The "Gorski Kotar Bike Tour", held annually since 2012, sometimes goes through Begovo Razdolje, such as in the second leg for 2022 and the second leg for 2024.

== Bibliography ==
=== Biology ===
- Šašić, Martina; Nahirnić, Ana; Tarmann, Gerhard M. (2016-12-31). "Zygaenidae (Lepidoptera) in the Lepidoptera collections of the Croatian Natural History Museum". Natura Croatica: Periodicum Musei Historiae Naturalis Croatici. 25 (2): 233–248. doi:10.20302/NC.2016.25.19. eISSN 1848-7386.

=== Linguistics ===
- Brabec, Ivan (1966). "Mješoviti govori na sjevernoj periferiji hrvatskosrpskog jezika". Ljetopis Jugoslavenske akademije znanosti i umjetnosti. 77: 421–425. ISSN 0373-9902.
