= Sunger =

- Village
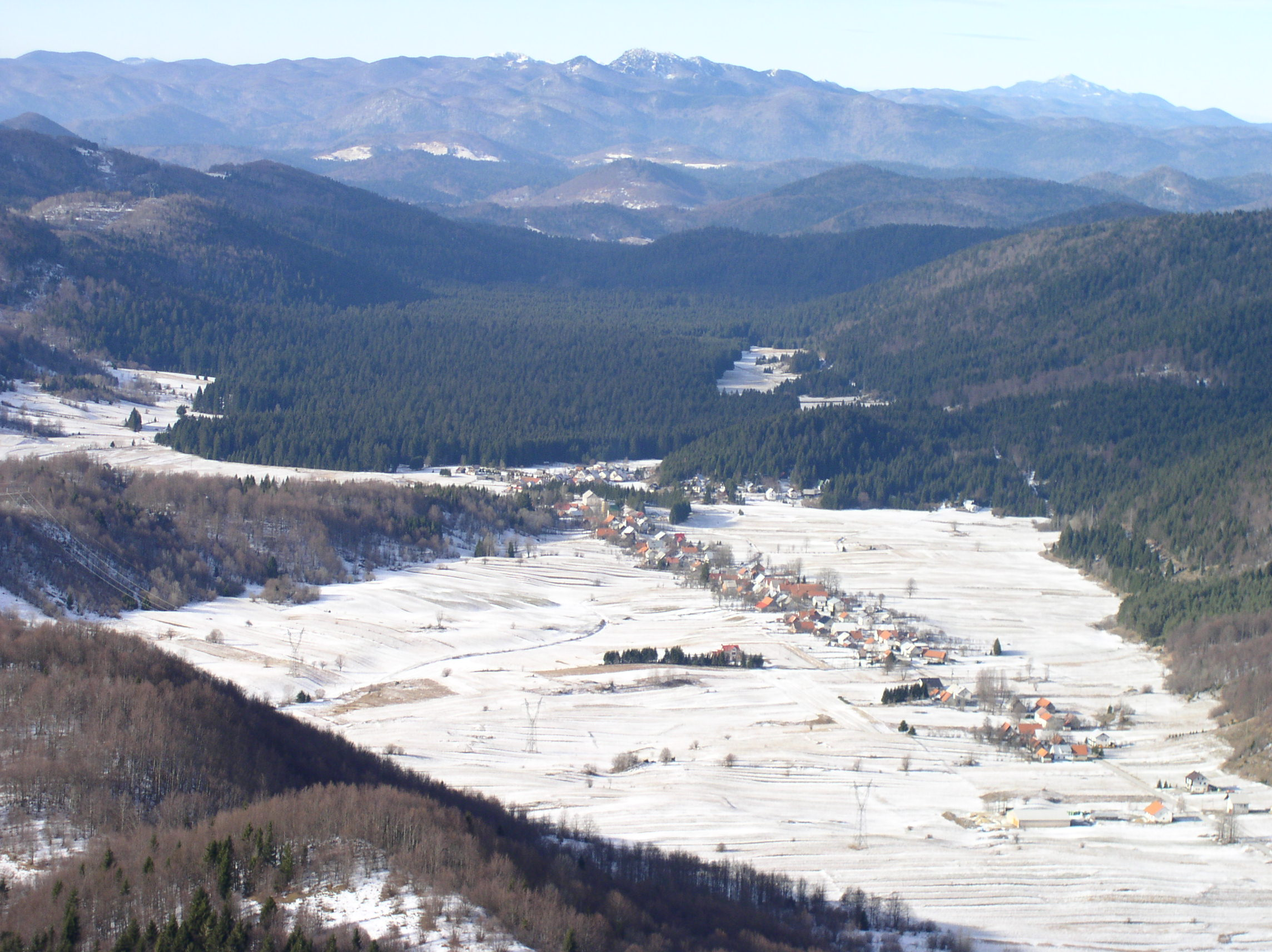
- Sunger in Sungerska kotlina

- Location within Croatia
- Coordinates: 45.323065°N 14.819684°E
- Country: Croatia
- County: Primorje-Gorski Kotar County
- City: Mrkopalj

Area
  - Total: 14.3 km^{2} (5.5 sq mi)

Population (2021)
  - Total: 262
  - Density: 18.3/km^{2} (47.5/sq mi)
- Time zone: UTC+1 (CET)
  - Summer (DST): UTC+2 (CEST)
- Postal code: 51326
- Area code: +385 051

Sunger is a village in Croatia, in the Mrkopalj municipality, in Primorje-Gorski Kotar County.

== History ==
The volunteer fire department DVD Sunger was founded in 1906, and is today part of the VZ općine Fužine. Its current commander is Mladen Tomić.

=== WWII ===
The Italians withdrew from Mrkopalj on 15 March 1942, on the same day as Mrkopalj and Ravna Gora. The Italians did not leave those towns along the railway, which they fortified with barbed wire.

On 5 July in Sunger, a Croatian soldier killed an Italian soldier by stabbing him 7 times with a knife.

=== Recent ===
Around 20:30 on 11 July 2010, firefighters were called to the house of a family in Sunger. The JVP Delnice, DVD Sunger and DVD Mrkopalj responded, putting the fire out at 23:30, but not before the house had burned down.

Nedeljko Kosanović of Gomirje managed to capture on camera a wolf carrying its prey in its mouth near the sawmill in Sunger. In late June 2011, four Eurasian brown bears attacked a herd of cattle. In August 2011, a pack of wolves attacked and killed an adult Cervus elaphus individual near the first houses in the middle of Sunger, shortly after which a faun found shelter from the wolves in a resident's yard.

In the evening of 3 May 2018, a car hit a pole in Sunger, leaving the driver in need of medical attention.

== Demographics ==
Village of Sunger: Population trends 1857–2021
v

| population | 665 | 606 | 651 | 705 | 706 | 609 | 482 | 485 | 577 | 518 | 467 | 464 | 434 | 387 | 333 | 326 | 262 |
| | 1857 | 1869 | 1880 | 1890 | 1900 | 1910 | 1921 | 1931 | 1948 | 1953 | 1961 | 1971 | 1981 | 1991 | 2001 | 2011 | 2021 |

Note:"Sungeri" until 1948. Sources: Croatian Bureau of Statistics publications

== Sports ==
Beginning in 2013, the 7 stage 260 kilometres (160 mi) long Cycling Trail of Gorski Kotar (Croatian: Goranska biciklistička transverzala) passes through Sunger.

== Gallery ==
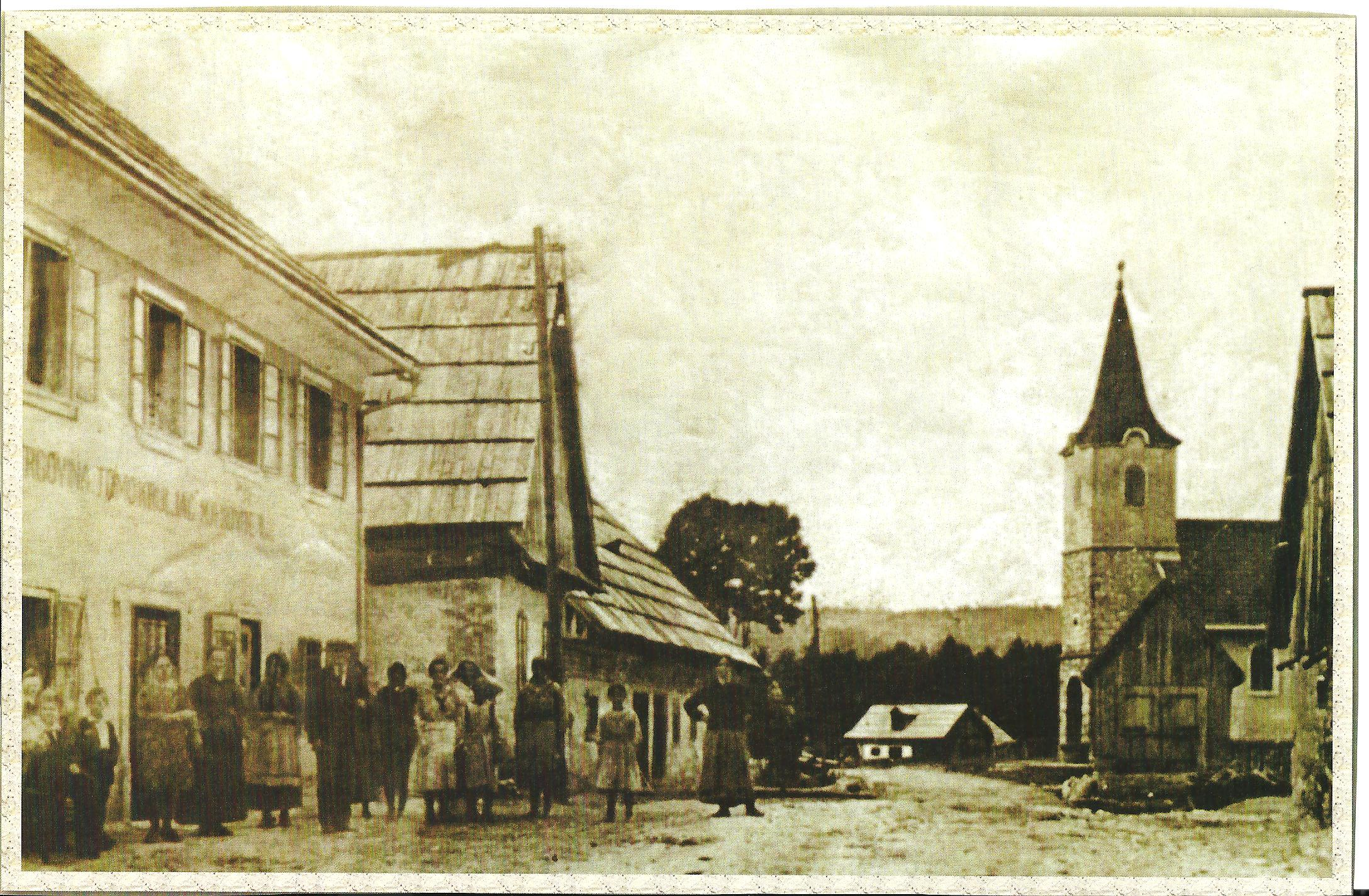
Old postcard of centre

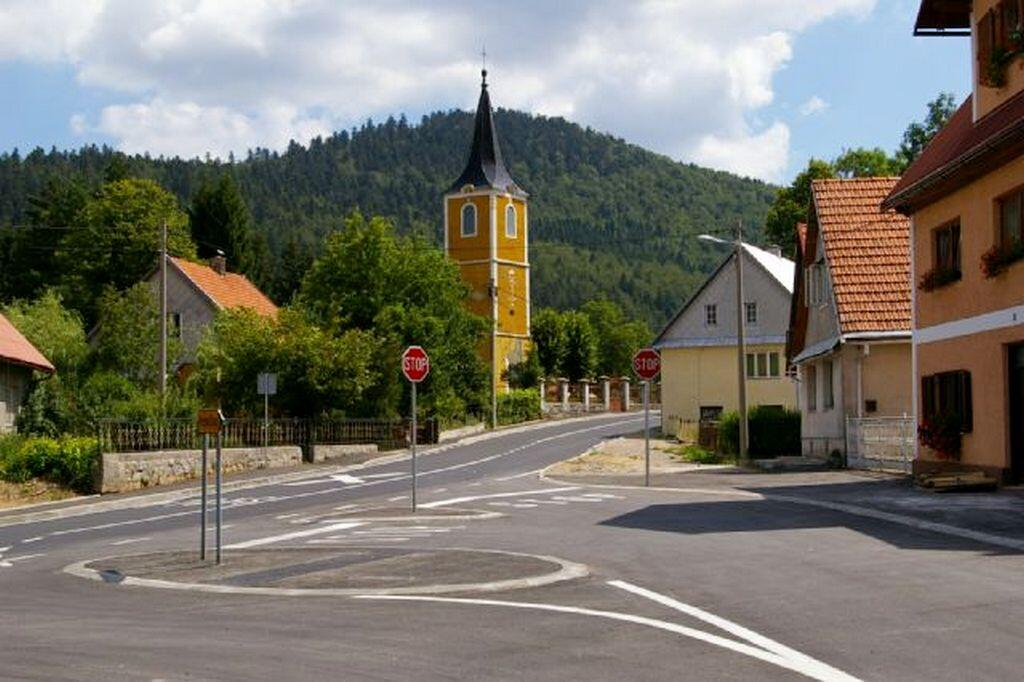
Centre today

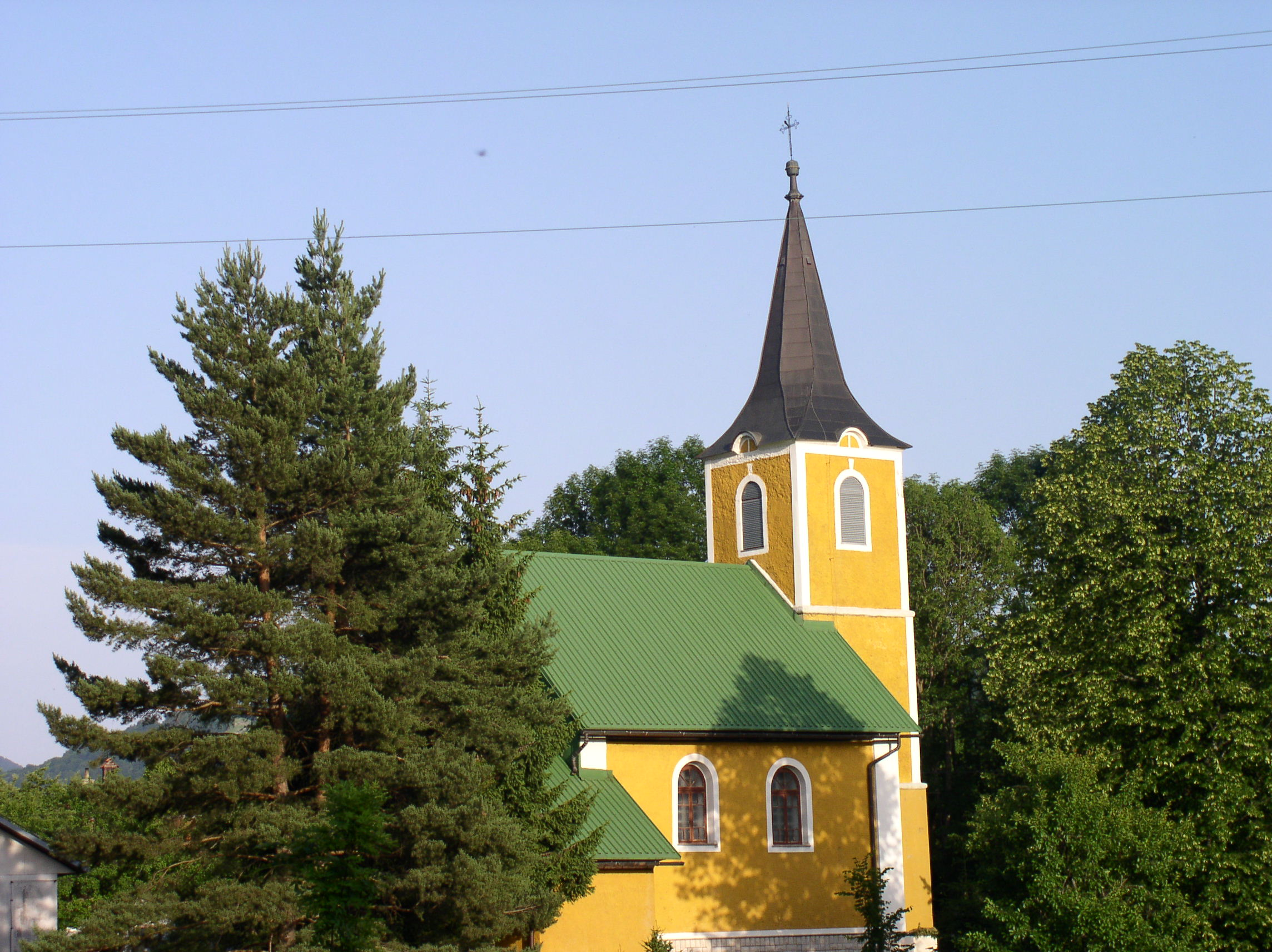
Sv. Ćirila i Metoda church

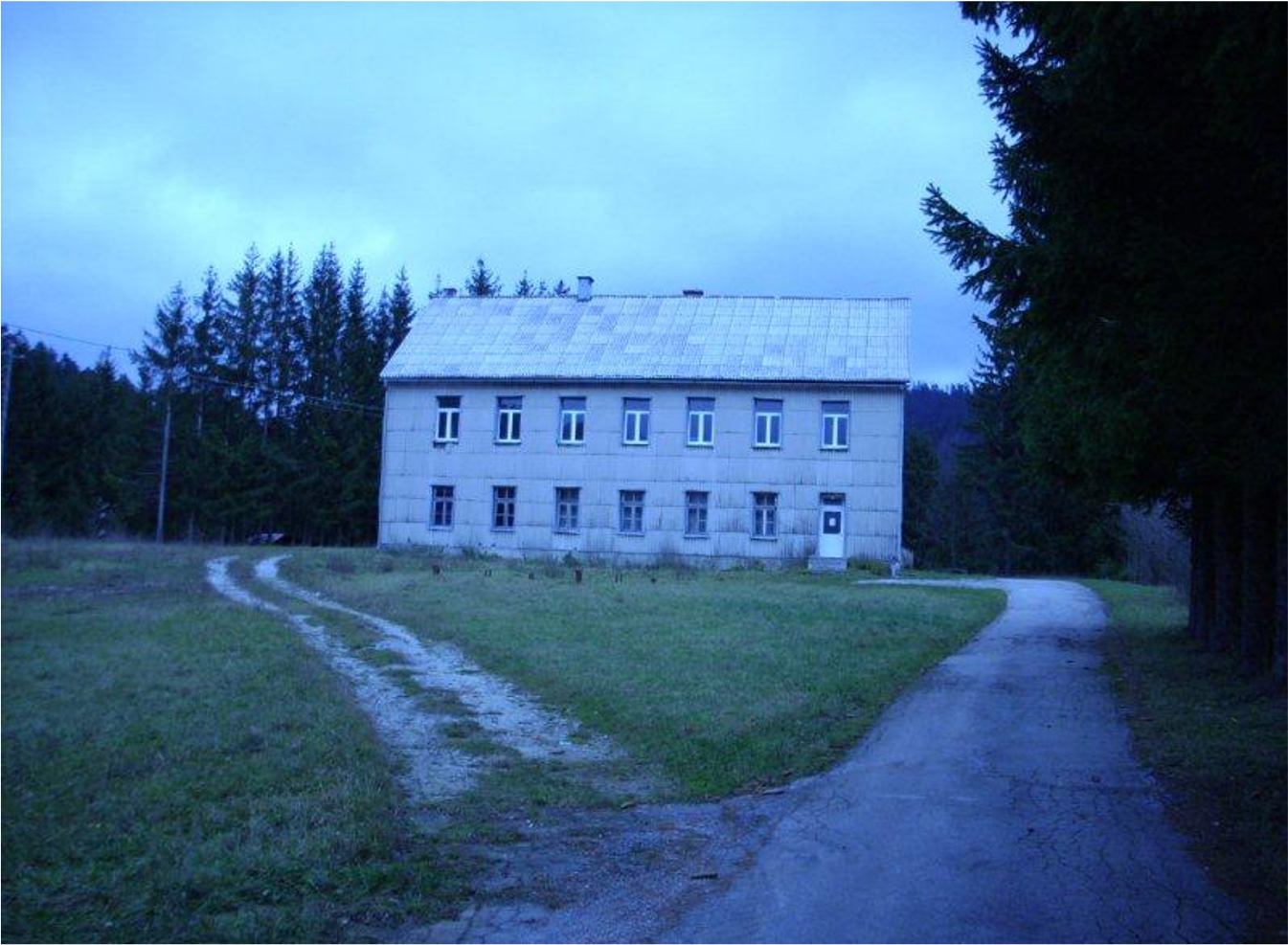
School in Sunger

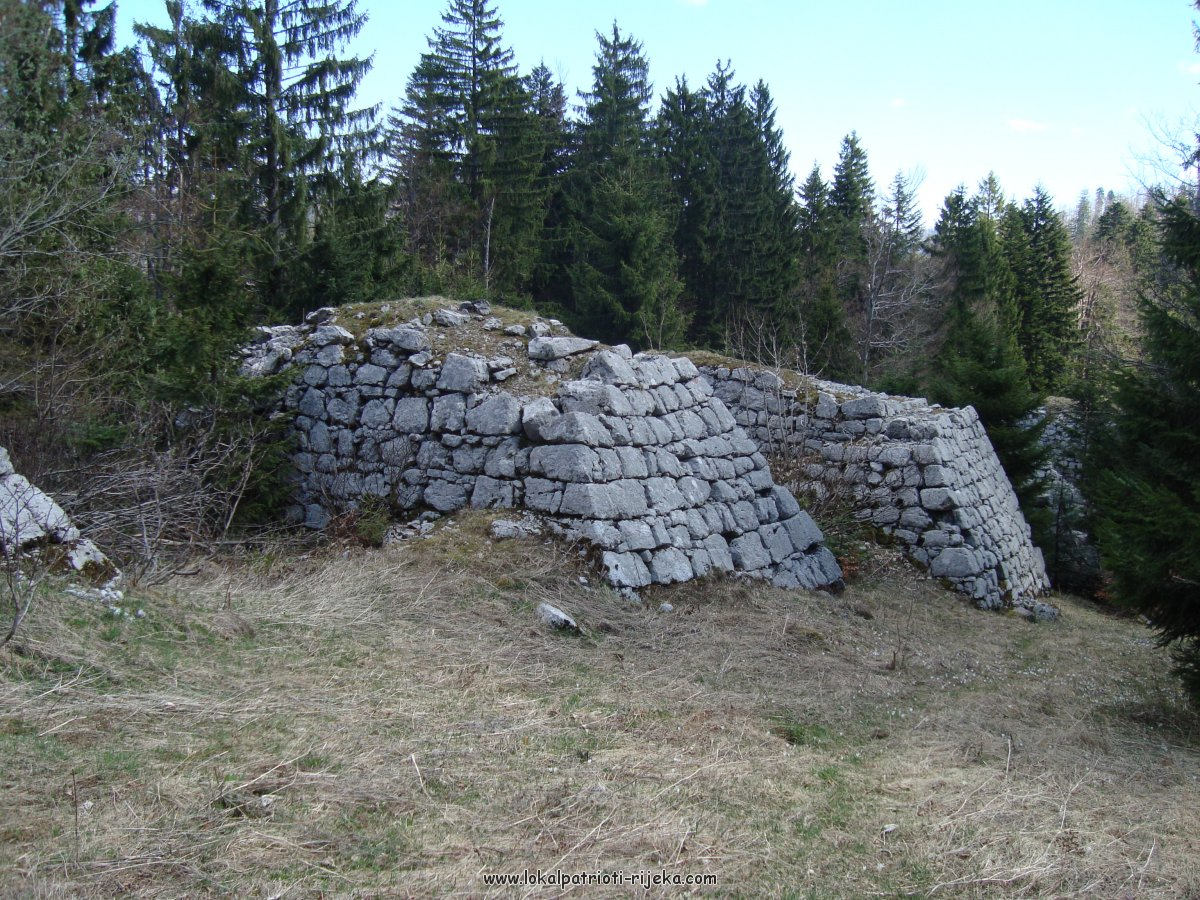
Karolina overpass

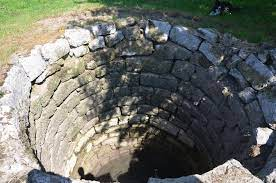
Well along the Karolina
