= Tuk Mrkopaljski =

- Village
- Location within Croatia
- Coordinates: 45.302845°N 14.876854°E
- Country: Croatia
- County: Primorje-Gorski Kotar County
- City: Mrkopalj

Area
  - Total: 13.1 km^{2} (5.1 sq mi)

Population (2021)
  - Total: 1
  - Density: 0.076/km^{2} (0.20/sq mi)
- Time zone: UTC+1 (CET)
  - Summer (DST): UTC+2 (CEST)
- Postal code: 51326
- Area code: +385 051

Tuk Mrkopaljski is a village in Croatia, in the Mrkopalj municipality, in Primorje-Gorski Kotar County.

== Demographics ==
Village of Tuk Mrkopaljski: Population trends 1857–2021
v

population	39	36	42	55	91	71	52	62	51	52	35	26	16	7	3	4	1
	1857	1869	1880	1890	1900	1910	1921	1931	1948	1953	1961	1971	1981	1991	2001	2011	2021

Note:Simply "Tuk" until 1900. Sources: Croatian Bureau of Statistics publications

== Attractions ==
The 37,800 square metres (407,000 ft^{2}) park of Matić-poljana nearby was designed by Zdenko Sila in 1969 in memory of the 13th Partisan Division.

== Sports ==
The "Gorski Kotar Bike Tour", held annually since 2012, sometimes goes through Tuk Mrkopaljski, such as in the second leg for 2024.
