= Tuks =

Tuks may refer to:

- Tuks Senganga, South African rapper
- a colloquial name for the University of Pretoria

== See also ==
- Tuk (disambiguation)
