= List of prefects of Primorje-Gorski Kotar County =

This is a list of prefects of Primorje-Gorski Kotar County.

== Prefects of Primorje-Gorski Kotar County (1993–present) ==
Croatian Social Liberal Party (HSLS)
Croatian Democratic Union (HDZ)
Alliance of Primorje-Gorski Kotar (PGS)
Social Democratic Party of Croatia (SDP)

No.	Portrait	Name (Born–Died)	Term of Office		Party
1		Josip Roje (1931–2019)	4 May 1993	5 June 1997	HSLS
		Josip Roje (1931–2019)	4 May 1993	5 June 1997	HDZ
—		Zlatko Pavelić (1939–); Commissioner	1997	29 January 1998	
2		Milivoj Brozina (1946–)	29 January 1998	5 July 2001	PGS
3		Zlatko Komadina (1958–)	5 July 2001	23 December 2011	SDP
—		Vidoje Vujić (1951–); Acting Prefect	23 December 2011	3 June 2013	SDP
(3)		Zlatko Komadina (1958–)	3 June 2013	June 2025	SDP
4		Ivica Lukanović (1969–)	6 June 2025	Incumbent	SDP

== See also ==
- Primorje-Gorski Kotar County
- List of county prefects of Croatia
