= Mrkopalj =

- Municipality
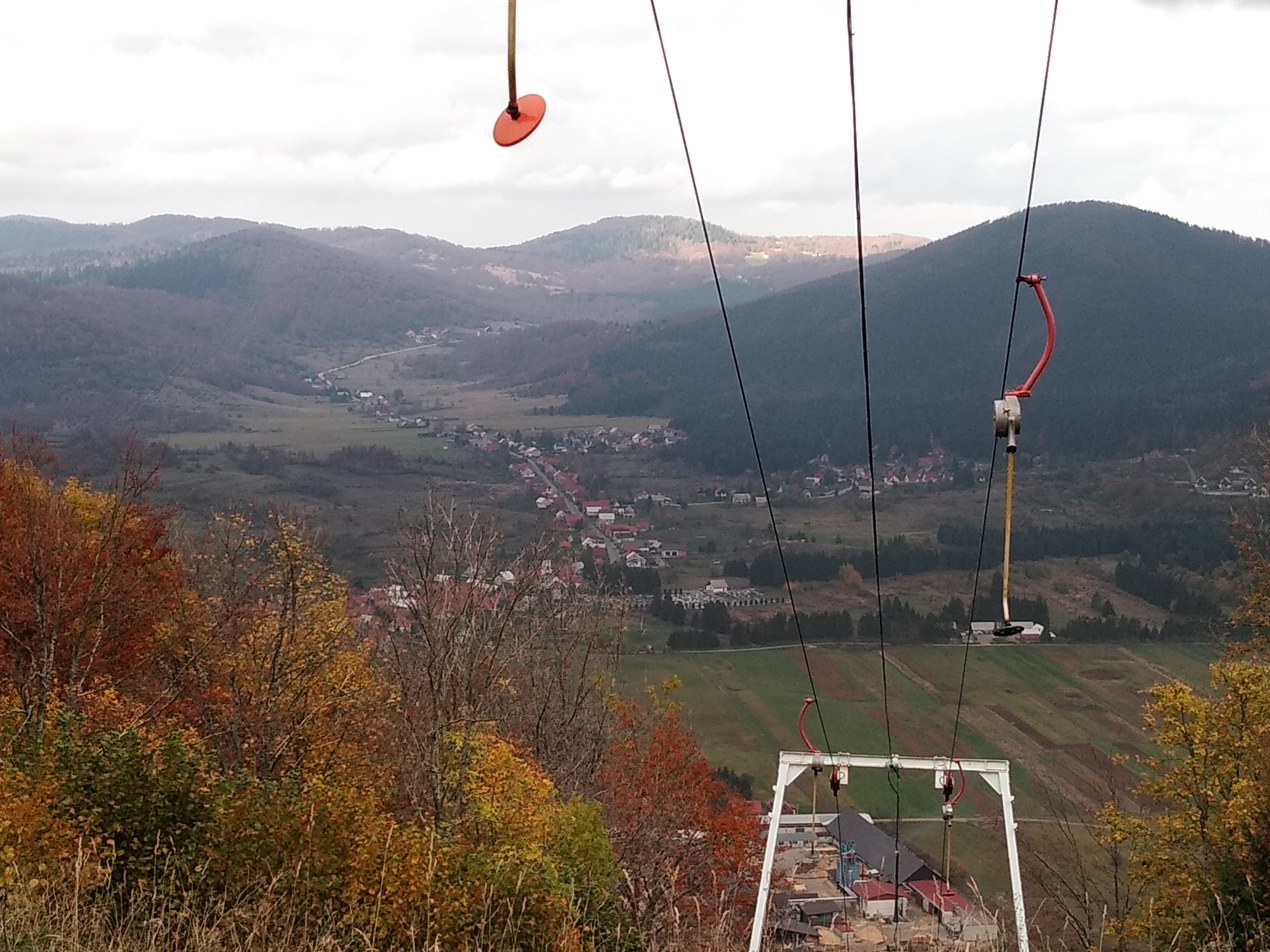
- Mrkopalj from Čelimbaša

- Location of Mrkopalj in Croatia
- Coordinates: 45°19′N 14°51′E
- Country: Croatia
- County: Primorje-Gorski Kotar County

Area
  - Municipality: 156.3 km^{2} (60.3 sq mi)
  - Urban: 42.3 km^{2} (16.3 sq mi)

Population (2021)
  - Municipality: 924
  - Density: 5.91/km^{2} (15.3/sq mi)
  - Urban: 557
  - Urban density: 13.2/km^{2} (34.1/sq mi)
- Website: mrkopalj.hr

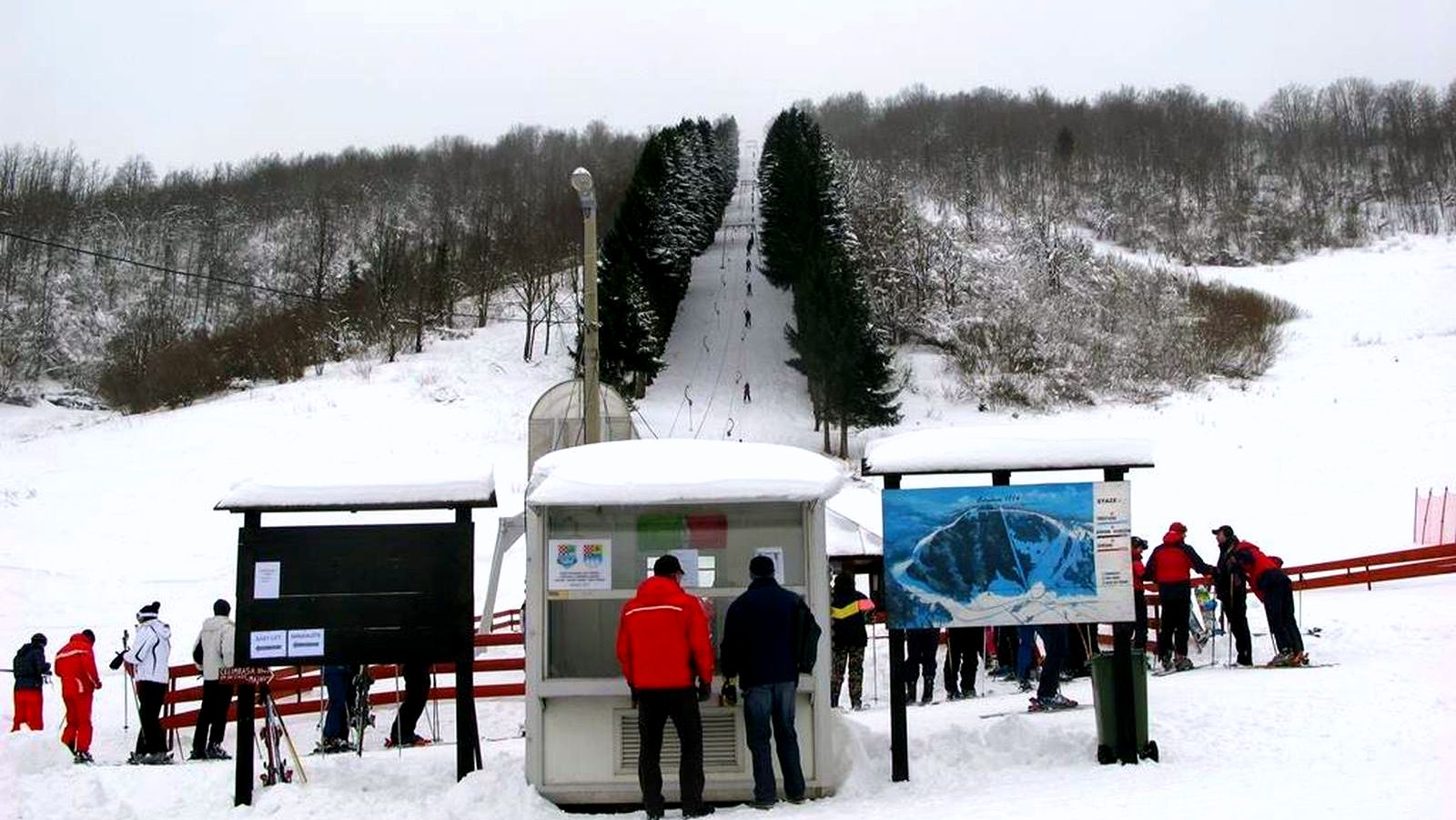
Čelimbaša ski resort

Mrkopalj (pronounced [mř̩kɔpaʎ]) is a village and a municipality in the mountainous part of Croatia in the region of Gorski Kotar, located south-east of Delnice and some 50 km east of Rijeka and 831 meters above sea level.

== History ==
On 14 February 1776, the Severin County was created by Maria Theresa, named after Severin, with Karlovac as its capital, although county assemblies were sometimes held in Mrkopalj or Rijeka. It was created after a 1765 decree called for the restoration of the ancient Vinodol County. It was abolished on 20 March 1786 by Joseph II.

The volunteer fire department DVD Mrkopalj was founded in 1898, and is today part of the VZ općine Fužine. Its current commander is Emil Vlahović.

=== Kingdom of Yugoslavia ===
The winter of 1931–1932 was particularly harsh in Čabar and surrounding areas. The lack of livestock feed caused a sharp decrease in livestock price. In the spring, a lack of supplies threatened to collapse the resale and even financial sectors locally. On 30 April 20, the emergency Law on the Protection of Farmers (Serbian: Zakon o zaštiti zemljoradnika) came into force, which prevented forcible sale of farmland until 20 October.

=== WWII ===
==== 1941 ====
On 11 April 1941, the new NDH authorities made Mrkopalj-born Lovro Sušić, a Frankist, administrator of the kotar of Ogulin.

When Ante Pavelić arrived in Delnice on 13 April 1941, he was awaited by a small group of Frankists. Along with Ravna Gora and Vrbovsko, Mrkopalj was one of the only places in Gorski Kotar that already had Ustaše. They asked Pavelić for assistance against some Royal Yugoslav Army soldiers who were in the hills nearby, and received from Pavelić a number of Ustaše in response. More concretely, a large group of Yugoslav soldiers had been retreating from the Italian border through Jelenje, Lokve, Mrkopalj and Jasenak. Upon entering Mrkopalj, they were met by a Croat force belonging to Mačekova zaštita, but the Yugoslav soldiers refused to disarm.

During the mass arrests of late May and early June, the Ustaša administration of Delnice kotar was more tolerant of Serbs than in the neighbouring Vrbovsko and Ogulin kotars. Tuk Vojni was the only Serbian village in Delnice kotar. The Ustaše had a list of 15 prominent Serbs in Tuk that they needed to arrest, but thanks to JRZ members of Mrkopalj and the notary (Note: "bilježniku Peri Sinku") they were not jailed.

On 9 June, Lovro Sušić, by that time Minister of People's Economy, wrote to in Hrvatski narod, "We don't want a bloody cleansing," (Croatian: Nećemo krvavog čišćenja) but "the Serbs must move" (Croatian: Srbi moraju seliti).

==== 1942 ====
The Italians withdrew from Mrkopalj on 15 March 1942, on the same day as Sunger and Ravna Gora. The Italians did not leave those towns along the railway, which they fortified with barbed wire.

On 20 March 1942, the Partisans entered and took Mrkopalj.

In May 1942, following the success of arming Serbs to form auxiliary chete in Moravice, Gomirje and Lička Jesenica, the Italian army decided to form similar armed groups from among the Croats of Mrkopalj and Ravna Gora.

==== 1945 ====
At the behest of Dušan Rašković, Ivan Butorac deacon of the Brod deaconate and parish priest of Mrkopalj and others gathered in Delnice signed a document recognising the JNOF on 21 February 1945, selecting a delegation to represent the priesthood before their authority. Butorac was chosen as the religious delegate of Gorski Kotar to the JNOF.

=== Recent ===
On 10 March 2009 at around 4:15, a bread delivery driver noticed the house of 77 year old Bogumir Starčević was on fire. He loudly banged on his door to wake him up. Starčević immediately ran outside and called the fire department. DVD Mrkopalj, DVD Sunger, DVD Delnice and JVP Delnice responded, but the fire was exceptionally strong and they could not put it out until long after the house had burned down, at 9:20.

From 31 January to 2 February 2014, while S and SW geostrophic wind dominated, freezing rain fell on Gorski Kotar, glazing the entire region. It wrecked roofs, power lines and forests, causing power loss for about 14,000 households in Gorski Kotar, or about 80% of its population. It took about 10 days to restore essential infrastructure to the region, and within months electricity was back in most of its former range, but at a cost of about 84.4 million HRK to HEP. At the time it was the largest peacetime damage since its Secession from Yugoslavia, even without counting the forestry losses. The Šumarija Mrkopalj lost 6% of its wood mass. Clearing blocked forestry roads and forest paths would take years, and thanks to the declining population some were never cleared.

== Climate ==
A weather station exists there at an elevation of 825 metres (2,707 ft), although under a shelter that compromises the applicability to surroundings. The minimum recorded temperature for the winter of 2024–2025 was −16.2 °C (2.8 °F), on February 20.

== Demographics ==
In 1870, Mrkopalj općina, in Delnice podžupanija, had 391 houses, with a population of 2718. Its 3 villages were divided into 2 porezne obćine for taxation purposes. Mrkopalj had its own parish.

In 1895, the obćina of Mrkopalj (court at Mrkopalj), with an area of 156 square kilometres (60 mi^{2}), belonged to the kotar of Delnice (Delnice court and electoral district) in the županija of Modruš-Rieka (Ogulin court and financial board). There were 650 houses, with a population of 3628. Its 5 villages and 1 hamlet were divided for taxation purposes into 3 porezne obćine, under the Delnice office. Mrkopalj had the only statistical market in the kotar.

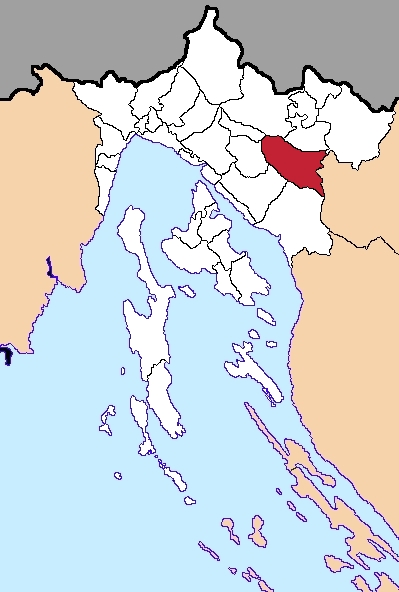
Municipality map

In the 2011 census, the municipality had 1,214 inhabitants, in the following settlements:

Municipality of Mrkopalj: Population trends 1857–2021
v

population	3427	3321	3607	3637	3790	3583	2931	3168	3007	3046	2650	2352	2002	1823	1407	1214	924
	1857	1869	1880	1890	1900	1910	1921	1931	1948	1953	1961	1971	1981	1991	2001	2011	2021

Note:Originated from the old općina Delnice. Sources: Croatian Bureau of Statistics publications
Village of Mrkopalj: Population trends 1857–2021
v

population	2065	1909	2063	2052	2030	2001	1631	1732	1700	1823	1590	1450	1222	1196	923	755	557
	1857	1869	1880	1890	1900	1910	1921	1931	1948	1953	1961	1971	1981	1991	2001	2011	2021

Sources: Croatian Bureau of Statistics publications

=== Villages ===
- Begovo Razdolje, population ▼36
- Brestova Draga, population ▼47
- Mrkopalj, population ▼557
- Sunger, population ▼262
- Tuk Mrkopaljski, population ▼1
- Tuk Vojni, population ▼21

In the 2011 census, over 98% of the population were Croats.

== Economy ==
There was a sawmill in Mrkopalj.

== Governance ==
=== National ===
At the 1920 Kingdom of Serbs, Croats and Slovenes Constitutional Assembly election in Modruš-Rijeka County, Mrkopalj voted mainly for the Croatian People's Peasant Party.

Results at the poll in Mrkopalj
Year	Voters	Electors	NRS	DSD	KPJ	HPSS	Independent	SS	HSP	HZ
1920	793	593	0	46	13	487	5	2	6	34

=== Local ===
Representatives of the Mrkopalj market town at the Croatian Parliament:

- Tomislav Cuculić (1848, 1861–1865) (Note: Together with Vrbovsko and Ravna Gora, but in 1861 it was soon decided to separate the three so by-elections were held and Cuculić remained representative only Mrkopalj.)
- Ante Starčević (1865), (Note: Simultaneously representing Zagreb III.) SP
- Mijo Mance (1865)

=== Judiciary ===
In 1875, the kotar court of Delnice encompassed a population of 28,347, being responsible for the općine: Delnice, Lokve, Fužine, Mrkopalj, Ravna Gora, Brod, Skrad, Vrbovsko.

== Industry ==
Mrkopalj was once a relatively important trading town in the Gorski Kotar highlands, where timber and sheep are the main resources.

Mountain snow sports are popular.

== Coat of arms ==
Emperor Joseph II granted the coat of arms and the status of a free royal market town in 1785. The grant of arms is similar in style with others granted in the period, including the aquarel picture of the coat of arms within a ring containing the inscription (thus making it a seal) and set in a baroque scene with mountains, angel broquate covers, coats of arms of selected Habsburg lands.

The shield is party per fess chief per pale: first chequy gules and argent, second or a lamb passant below a fir tree vert trunked proper issuant from a base also vert, and third azure five cliff spikes argent. The modern community adopted (around 1995) the same coat of arms in a modernized artistic rendition as required by regulations.

The decision on adoption of the coat of arms for Mrkopalj, and the flag was adopted on 12 March 1998 and this was issued in the official gazette in May 1998: Odluka o grbu i zastavi Opcine Mrkopalj, 12.03.1998, Službene novine Primorsko-goranske županije, br. 11/98, 29. svibnja 1998.

The flag is dark blue with the coat of arms bordered yellow in the middle.

== Sports ==
Beginning in 2013, the 7 stage 260 kilometres (160 mi) long Cycling Trail of Gorski Kotar (Croatian: Goranska biciklistička transverzala) passes through Mrkopalj.

The "Gorski Kotar Bike Tour", held annually since 2012, sometimes goes through Mrkopalj, such as in the second leg for 2022 and the second leg for 2024.

== Infrastructure ==
The forestry offices of Delnice srez were in Mrkopalj and Fužine.

== Notable residents ==
- Lovro Sušić, Ustaša politician
- Jakov Fak, Olympic biathlete
- Nada Birko, Olympic cross-country skier

== In popular culture ==
American author Jennifer Wilson's 2011 non-fiction book, Running Away to Home: Our Family's Journey to Croatia in Search of Who We Are, Where We Came From, and What Really Matters, takes place in Mrkopalj. She and her husband and two children spent seven months in the village, to reconnect to her immigrant maternal grandparents' relatives and culture.

== Gallery ==
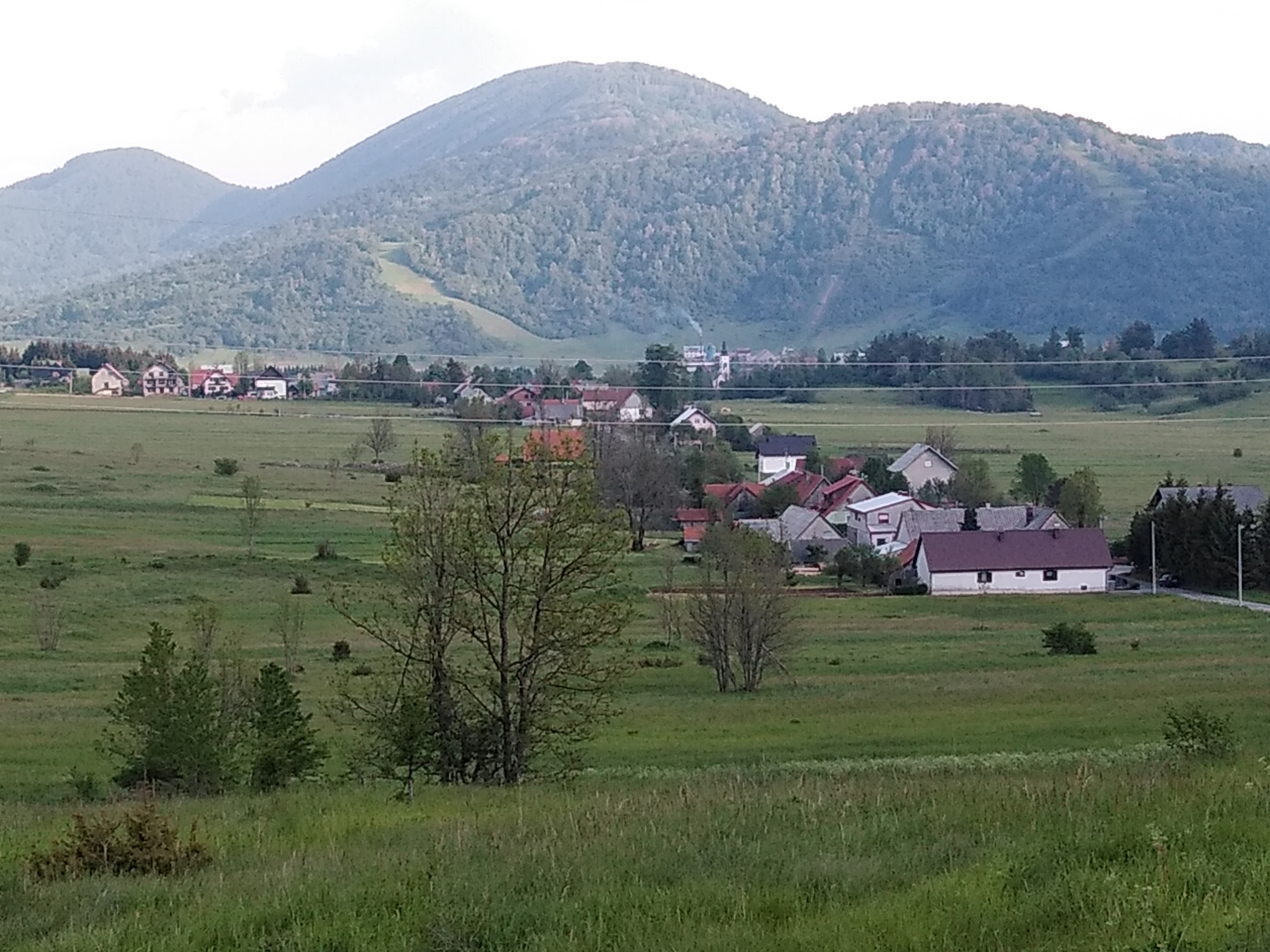
Viewed from Kosa

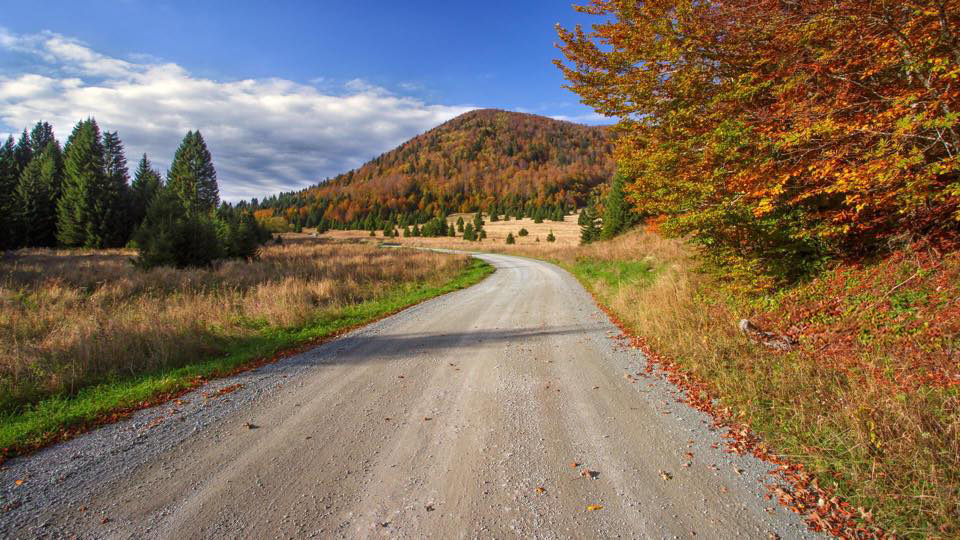
Gravel road

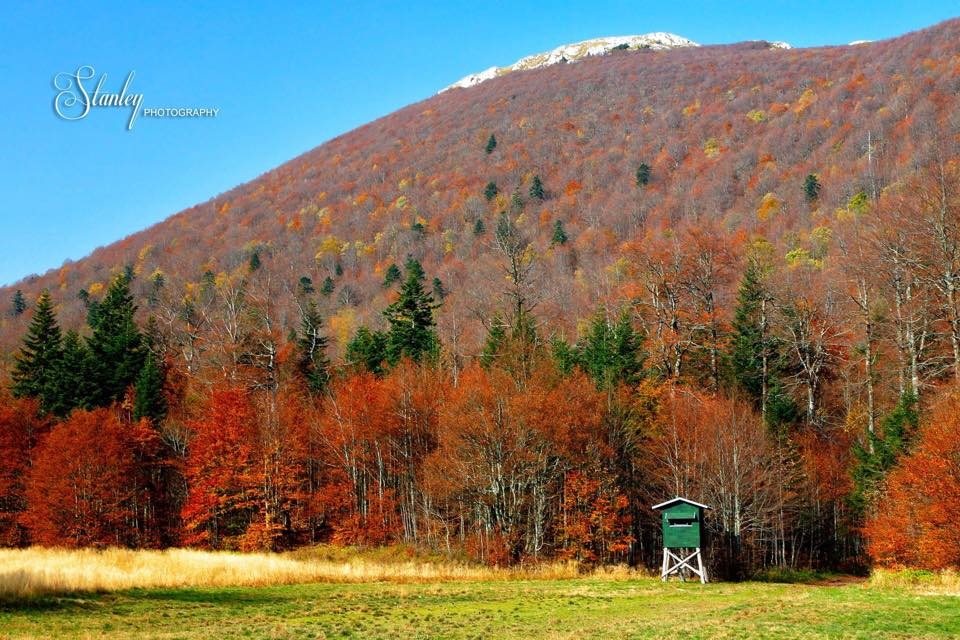
Near Matić poljana

== Bibliography ==
- OONF PGO (1945-03-19). "Svećenstvo Gorskog Kotara pristupa JNOf-i". Primorski vjesnik: Glasilo jedinstvene Narodno-oslobodilačke fronte Hrvatskog primorja (in Serbo-Croatian). No. 144. p. 4.
