= Tuk Vojni =

- Village
- Location within Croatia
- Coordinates: 45.297381°N 14.881361°E
- Country: Croatia
- County: Primorje-Gorski Kotar County
- City: Mrkopalj

Area
  - Total: 24.8 km^{2} (9.6 sq mi)

Population (2021)
  - Total: 21
  - Density: 0.85/km^{2} (2.2/sq mi)
- Time zone: UTC+1 (CET)
  - Summer (DST): UTC+2 (CEST)
- Postal code: 51300

Tuk Vojni or Vojni Tuk is a village in Croatia, in the Mrkopalj municipality, in Primorje-Gorski Kotar County.

== History ==
During the mass arrests of late May and early June, the Ustaša administration of Delnice kotar was more tolerant of Serbs than in the neighbouring Vrbovsko and Ogulin kotars. Tuk Vojni was the only Serbian village in Delnice kotar. The Ustaše had a list of 15 prominent Serbs in Tuk that they needed to arrest, but thanks to JRZ members of Mrkopalj and the notary (Note: "bilježniku Peri Sinku") they were not jailed.

== Climate ==
A weather station exists there at an elevation of 875 metres (2,871 ft). The minimum recorded temperature for the winter of 2024–2025 was −16.0 °C (3.2 °F), on February 20.

On 1 December 2023, 292 millimetres (11.5 in) of rain fell in a 24 hour period.

== Demographics ==
Village of Tuk Vojni: Population trends 1857–2021
v

population	173	258	303	293	361	349	247	288	178	182	147	112	100	56	45	28	21
	1857	1869	1880	1890	1900	1910	1921	1931	1948	1953	1961	1971	1981	1991	2001	2011	2021

Note:Simply "Tuk" until 1890. Sources: Croatian Bureau of Statistics publications

== Sports ==
The "Gorski Kotar Bike Tour", held annually since 2012, sometimes goes through Tuk Vojni, such as in the second leg for 2024.
