= 13th Division (Yugoslav Partisans) =

13th Primorsko-Goranska Division
- Flag of Democratic Federal Yugoslavia (used by the Partisans)
- Active: 1943–1945
- Country: Democratic Federal Yugoslavia
- Branch: Yugoslav Partisan Army
- Type: Infantry
- Size: 1,986 (upon formation)
- Part of: 11th Corps
- Engagements: World War II in Yugoslavia

Commanders
- Notable commanders: Veljko Kovačević

The 13th Primorsko-Goranska (Note: "Primorsko" part of the name refers to Croatian Littoral, while "Goranska" part refers to Gorski Kotar) Assault Division (Serbo-Croatian Latin: Trinaesta primorsko-goranska udarna divizija) was a Yugoslav Partisan division formed in Brinje on 19 April 1943. On the day of its formation it consisted of 1,986 soldiers in two brigades: the 6th and 14th Primorsko-Goranska Brigades. Commander of the brigade was Veljko Kovačević while its political commissar was Josip Skočilić. The division mostly operated in the regions of Croatian Littoral and Gorski Kotar. In January 1944, the division became part of the 11th Corps. By the end of the war the division grew in size to around 5,600 soldiers.
