= Gorski Kotar =

Mountain range in Croatia

Coordinates: 45°28′33″N 14°34′34″E

- Geographic region^{a}
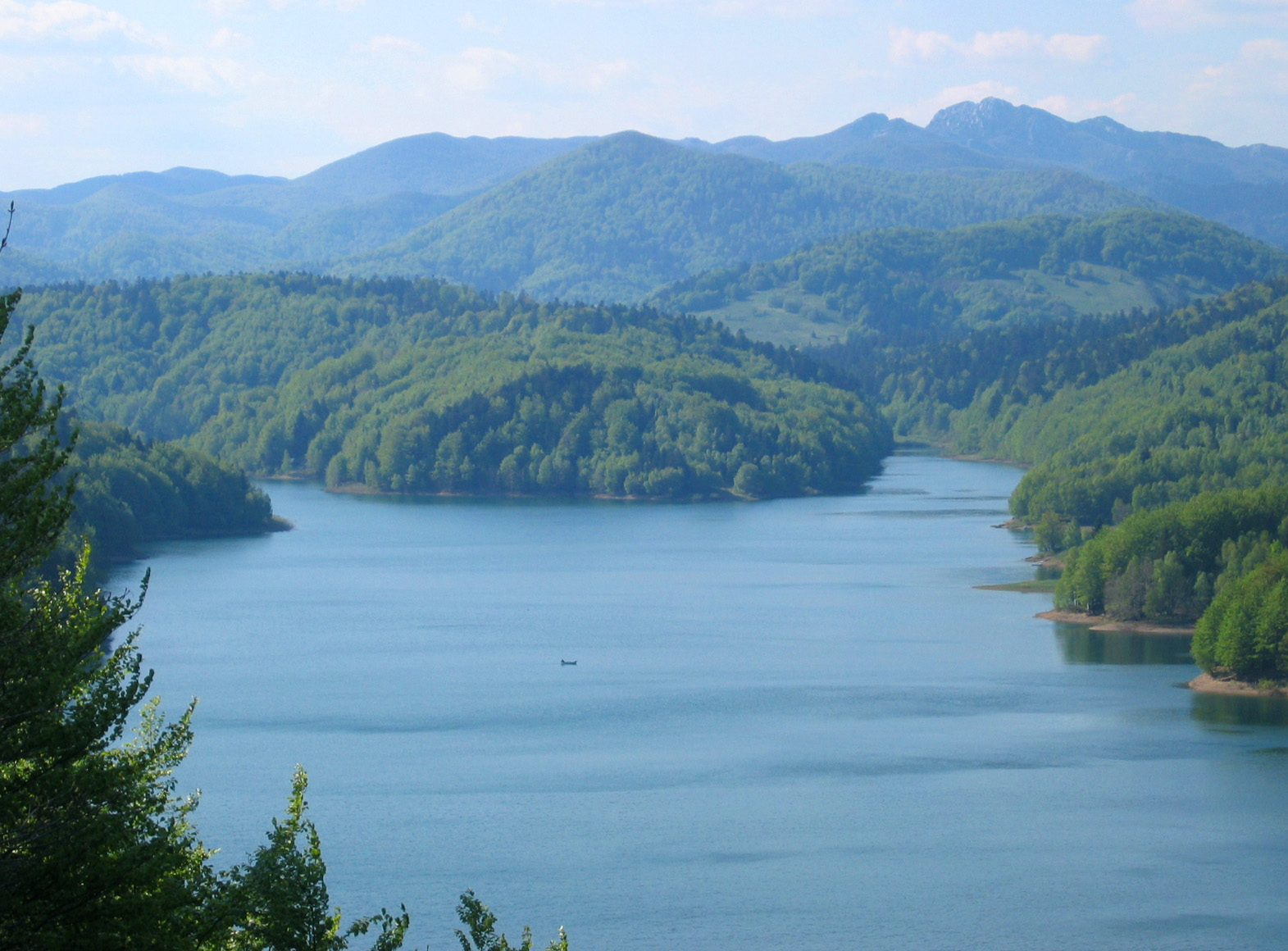
- Lake Lokve in Gorski Kotar, Mt. Risnjak in the distance.
- Etymology: Croatian: gorski kotar, lit. 'mountainous district'
- Map of Gorski Kotar within Croatia.
- Country: Croatia
- Largest town: Delnice

Area^{b}
  - Total: 1,275 km^{2} (492 sq mi)

Population (2001)^{c}
  - Total: 26,120
  - Density: 20.49/km^{2} (53.06/sq mi)
- ^{a} Gorski Kotar is not designated as an official region, it is a geographic region only.

Gorski Kotar (Croatian pronunciation: [ɡǒrski kôtaːr]) (Note: Croatian: Gorski kotar, Slovene: Gorski kotar; German: Bergland, German pronunciation: [ˈbɛɾɡlant]; Italian: Montanaro, Italian pronunciation: [montaˈnaro]; English: 'Highlands', 'Hills District') is the mountainous region in Croatia between Karlovac and Rijeka. Because 63% of its surface is forested it is popularly called the green lungs of Croatia or Croatian Switzerland. The European route E65, which connects Budapest and Zagreb with the Adriatic Port of Rijeka, passes through the region.

== Geography ==
The region is divided between Primorje-Gorski Kotar County and Karlovac County. The majority of the region lies in Primorje-Gorski Kotar County including the cities of Delnice, Čabar, Vrbovsko; and the municipalities of Mrkopalj, Ravna Gora, Skrad, Brod na Kupi, Fužine and Lokve. The part of the region that is in Karlovac County contains the municipality of Bosiljevo and part of the city of Ogulin. With a population of 4454, Delnice is the largest city of the region and its center. Other centers with populations of more than 1,000 are Vrbovsko (1,900) and Ravna Gora (1,900). Begovo Razdolje, the highest town in Croatia, is located in Gorski Kotar at an altitude of 1,076 metres (3,530 ft).

Geomorphically, Gorski Kotar is on the karstic plateau about 35 kilometres (22 mi) and has an average altitude of 800 metres (2,600 ft). The highest point is Bjelolasica at 1,534 metres (5,033 ft), followed by Risnjak at 1,528 metres (5,013 ft). The plateau is a climatic barrier between the littoral and continental parts of the country. The border with the Kvarner region is defined by the divide between the drainage basins of the Black Sea and of the Adriatic Sea. Its southern border with Lika is not clearly defined but most scholars consider it to be the Jasenak–Novi Vinodolski road and people of Jasenak consider themselves to be somewhere between Gorski Kotar and Lika. To the north, the Kupa River is the border between Gorski Kotar and Slovenia's White Carniola region.

== History ==
The first known inhabitants of the Gorski Kotar was the Illyrian tribe of the Iapodes, who lived in the area from the 9th century BC on. They were later subjugated by the Romans, who built lines of fortification from Grobnik to Prezid. In the 6th century, the Croats began to settle the area, but hereafter the history of Gorski Kotar is obscure until the 12th century when the noble family Frankopans began to rule much of Gorski Kotar. The Frankopans initiated the first wave of settlement in the 14th century, first colonizing the eastern part of the Gorski Kotar, making their stronghold at Bosiljevo.

In the 15th century, due to the Ottoman intrusions, the geopolitical significance of the Gorski Kotar increased. This led to a new wave of settlement and the creation of defensive fortifications, which in turn led to the development of more important towns in the region. After a short period of insecurity, settlement renewed at the end of the 16th century, when many Ottoman exiles and refugees (mostly Shtokavian-speaking, and many Vlach Orthodox Christians) came to this region. They settled along the border with the Ottoman Empire: in Gomirje, Vrbovsko, Dobra, Moravice, Stari Laz, Sušica, Mrkopalj, and Lič. From the mid-17th century until the beginning of the 18th century, the most developed part of the region was the area around Čabar, where the Zrinskis had control over iron mines and metallurgic manufacturing. Čabar and its surroundings were settled by a Slovene population from Carniola and Chakavian from Kvarner. After the failed Zrinski-Frankopan plot their properties were confiscated and shared among many other nobles, whereupon the local population was exploited with increased severity.

The most intense period of settlement began in the 18th century with the 1732 opening of the Karolina road, which linked Karlovac and Bakar. Most immigrants were from Kvarner but Czechs, Slovenes and descendants of Ottoman exiles also came. After the road opened, economic activity in the region flourished, especially kirijašenje - the transportation of goods from the interior to the Adriatic (those engaged in this form of transportation were referred to locally as 'kirci'). The most developed center in this period was Ravna Gora. In 1777 by decree of Maria Theresia, all of the Gorski Kotar was incorporated into the county of Severin.

During the Napoleonic wars, the Gorski Kotar was part of France's Illyrian Provinces. The French built between 1803 and 1809 a newer, wider road Lujziana named after Napoleon's second wife Marie Louise, which connected Karlovac and Rijeka and led to more development of Gorski Kotar, and Delnice became the most developed center in the region. It linked Rijeka with Karlovac through Grobničko polje, Kamenjak, Gornje Jelenje, Lokve, Delnice, Skrad, Stubica, Severin na Kupi, and Netretić.[1] The length of the Louisiana road was 18 Austrian miles (1 mile = 7.585 km). It was about 6 m wide. It was the shortest route between Rijeka and Karlovac, and was one of the most modern roads in the empire. With the building of the Lujzijana, the Karolina road became less important. The road is still in use.

After the war, Gorski Kotar was again under the Habsburg monarchy, and in 1873, the first railway in the region was built. However, this decreased dependence on kirijašenje and an economic crisis ensued that forced many to leave the region. In 1886, a new administrative division was made and all of the Gorski Kotar was incorporated into Rijeka county.

After the First World War, the Gorski Kotar was part of the Kingdom of Serbs, Croats and Slovenes.

On 21 July 1921 Alija Alijagić, a member of the communist organization Crvena Pravda, shot the Minister of the Interior Milorad Drašković in Delnice. Although Milorad Drašković was a staunch anti-communist, and enacted several pieces of anti-communist legislation, the Communist Party of Yugoslavia condemned the act. Nevertheless, this inspired the King to make a 'law concerning protection of the state' that made the communist party illegal.

During the Second World War, the Gorski Kotar was divided between Italy and the Independent State of Croatia. Citizens of the Gorski Kotar participated greatly in the anti-fascist struggle, and several popular post-war TV series were made about Gorski Kotar's resistance efforts, Kapelski kresovi being one.

In the 1990s, construction of the Zagreb – Rijeka motorway was resumed, part of it having already been built in 1973 (Zagreb – Karlovac and Rijeka – Oštrovica), and in 1997 Delnice was connected to Rijeka. In 2004 the motorway was finished by connecting the two directions of motorway in Vrbovsko. The motorway is now known as A6 and it was upgraded to the full two-lane format in 2008.

Gorski Kotar was hit by the 2014 Dinaric ice storm. From 31 January to 2 February, freezing rain fell on Gorski Kotar, glazing the entire region. Initially, Cyclone Ilija (2014) was believed to be the cause. But later investigation showed S and SW geostrophic wind dominated at the time. It wrecked roofs, power lines an forests, causing power loss for about 14,000 households in Gorski Kotar, or about 80% of its population. It took about 10 days to restore essential infrastructure to the region, and within months electricity was back in most of its former range, but at a cost of about 84.4 million HRK to HEP. At the time it was the largest peacetime damage since its Secession from Yugoslavia, even without counting the forestry losses. The hardest hit was the area of the Šumarija Rijeka, which lost 60% of its wood mass. Clearing blocked forestry roads and forest paths would take years, and thanks to the declining population some were never cleared.

== Population ==
The inhabitants of Gorski Kotar are known as Gorani. The population density of Gorski Kotar is low, but the highest in Mountainous Croatia. As of 2023, 18,442 people were living in an area of about 1,273 square kilometers, which is about 14.5 people per square kilometer. Linguistically, the region is very diverse; in a relatively small area, all three Croatian dialects can be heard. The local Chakavian dialect has been described by linguists as having been partially "Kajkavianized".
