= Primorje-Gorski Kotar County =

County in western Croatia

Coordinates: 45.454°N 14.594°E

Primorje-Gorski Kotar County Primorsko-goranska županija (Croatian)
- County
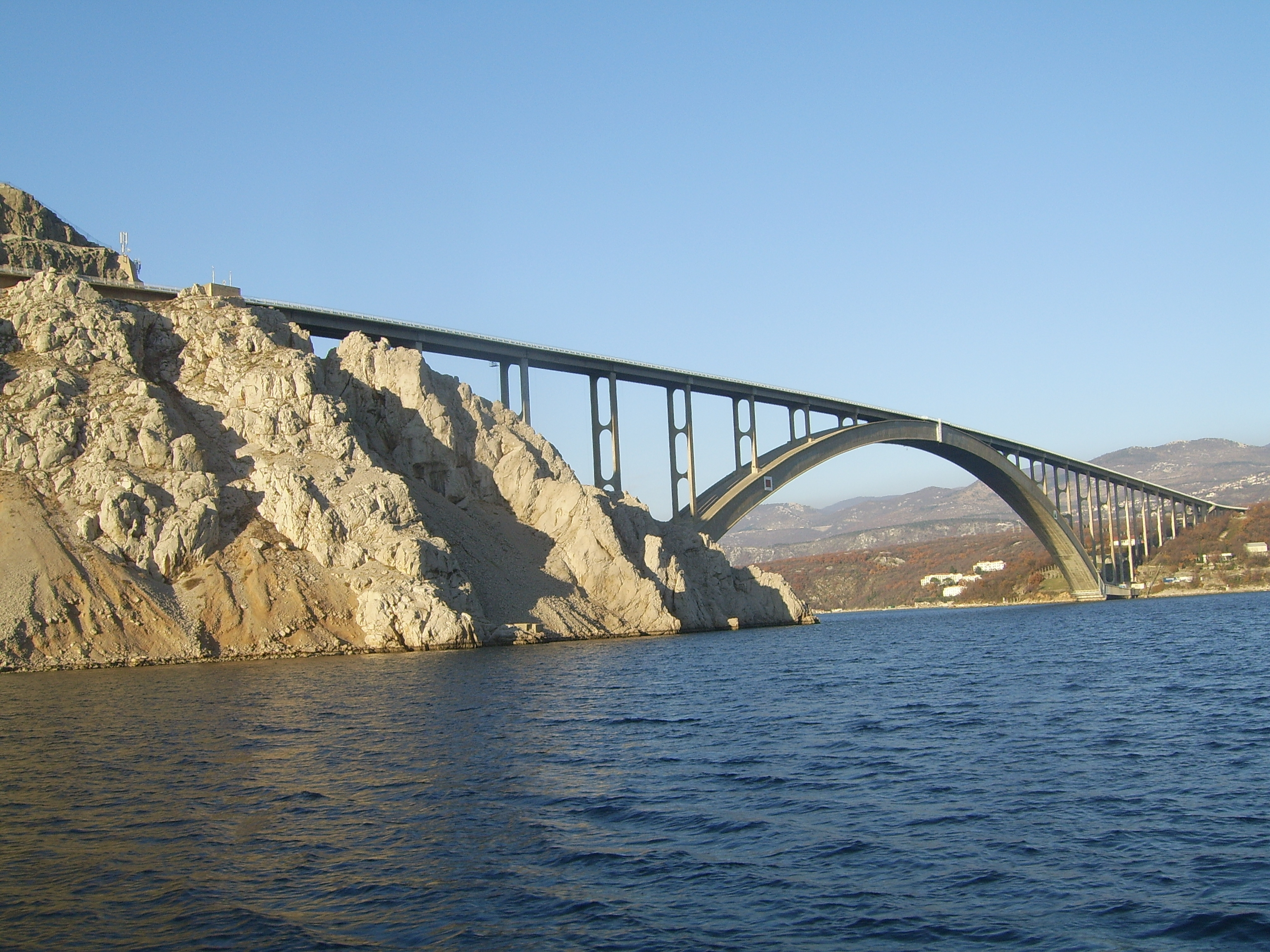
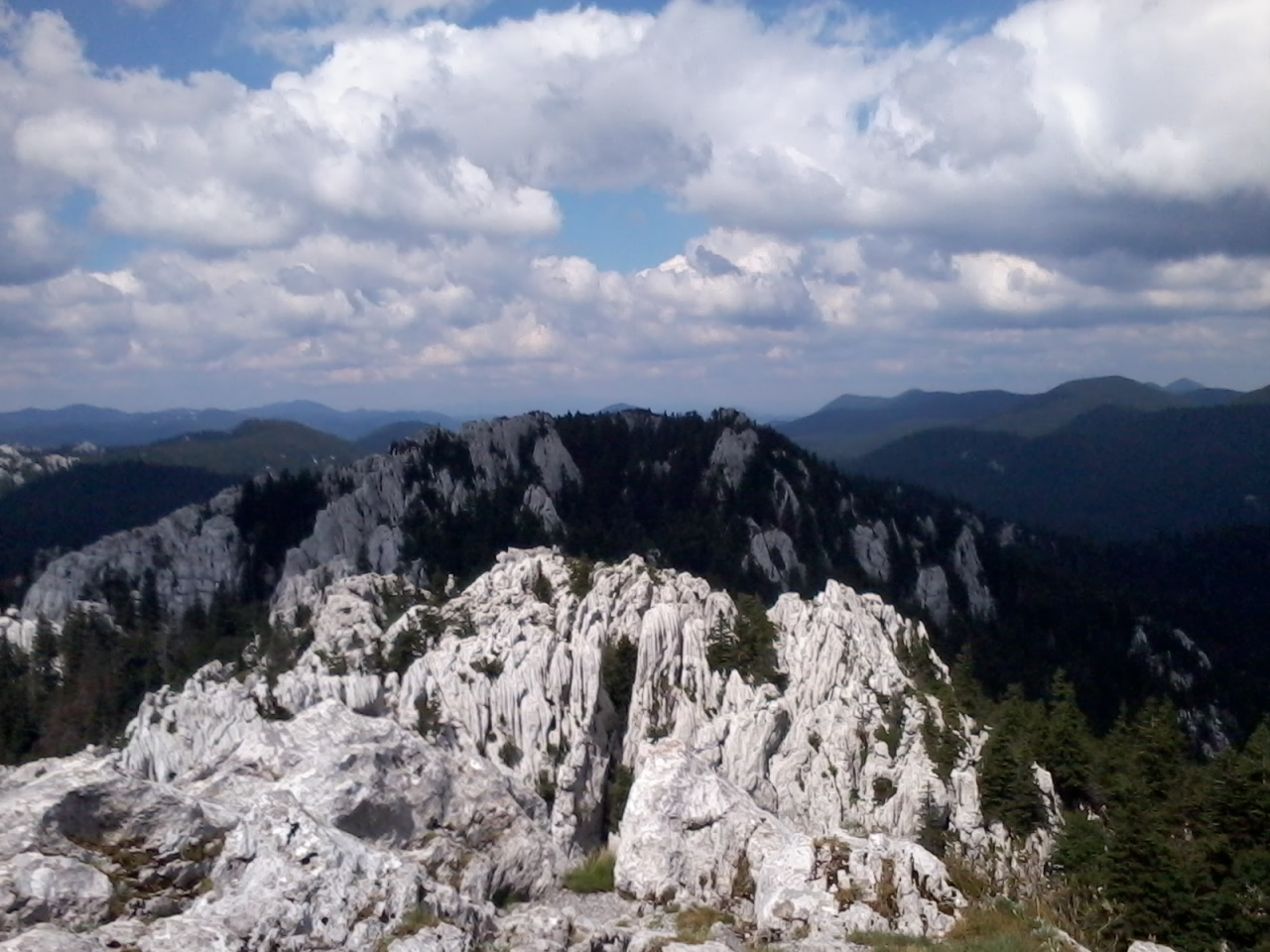
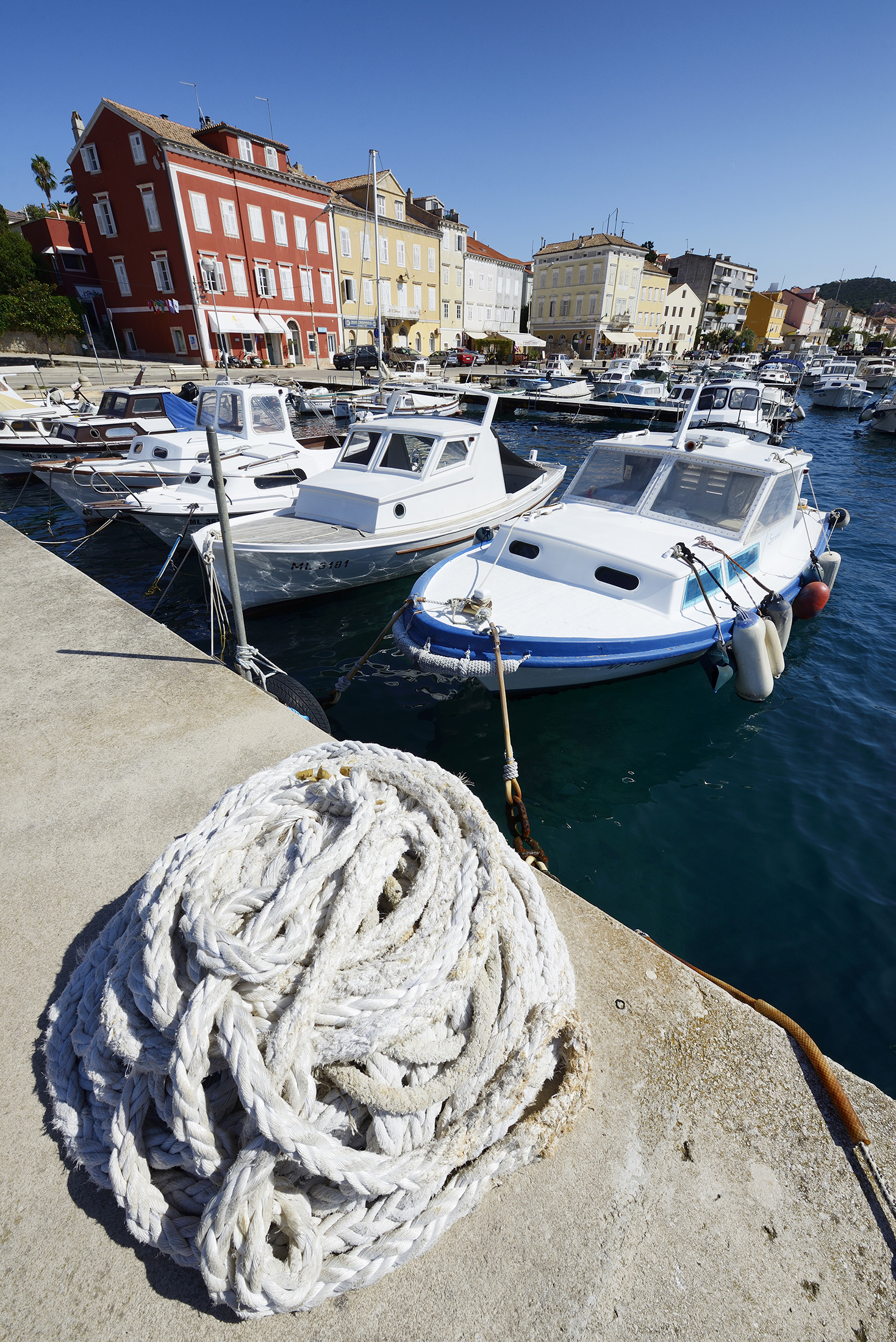
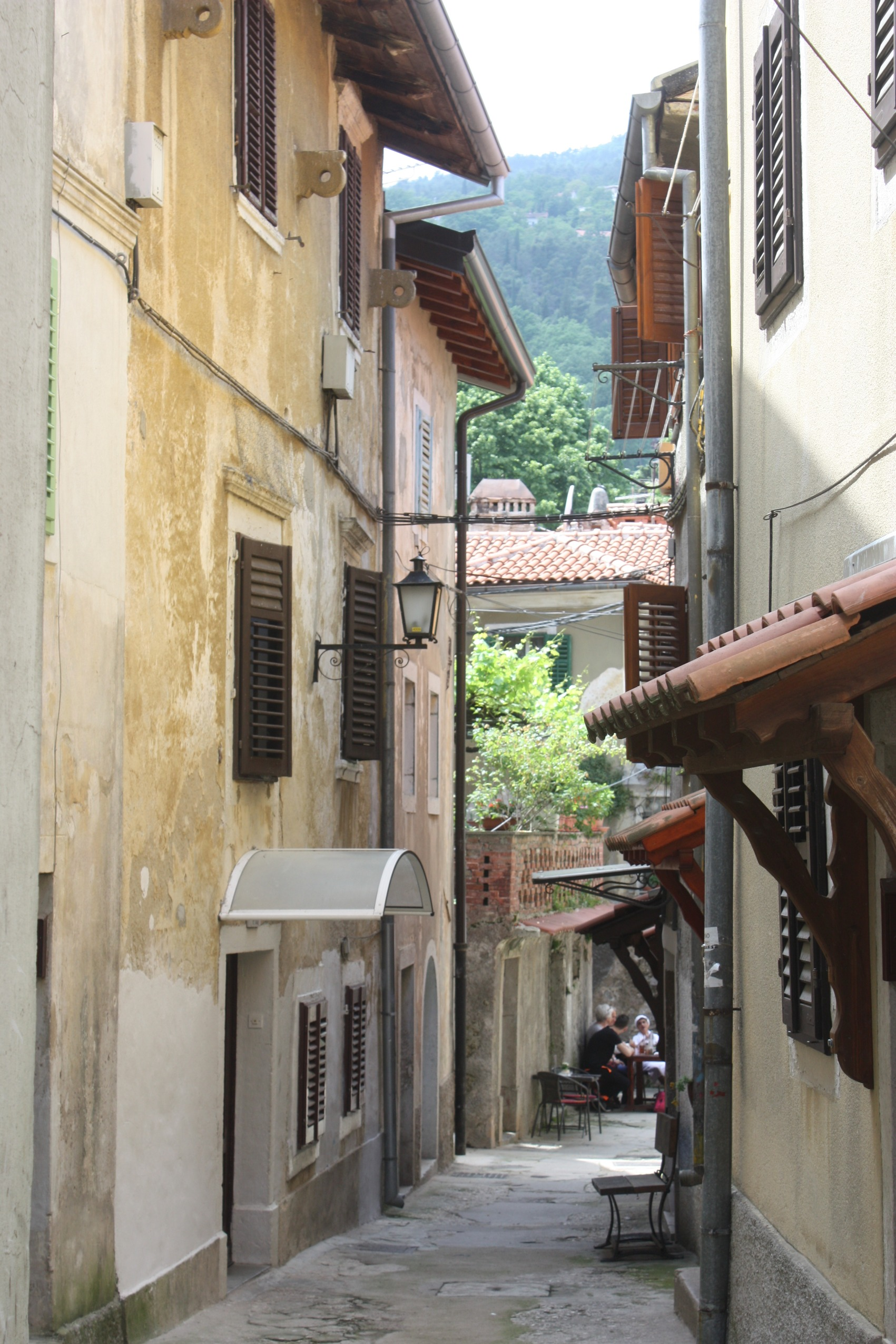
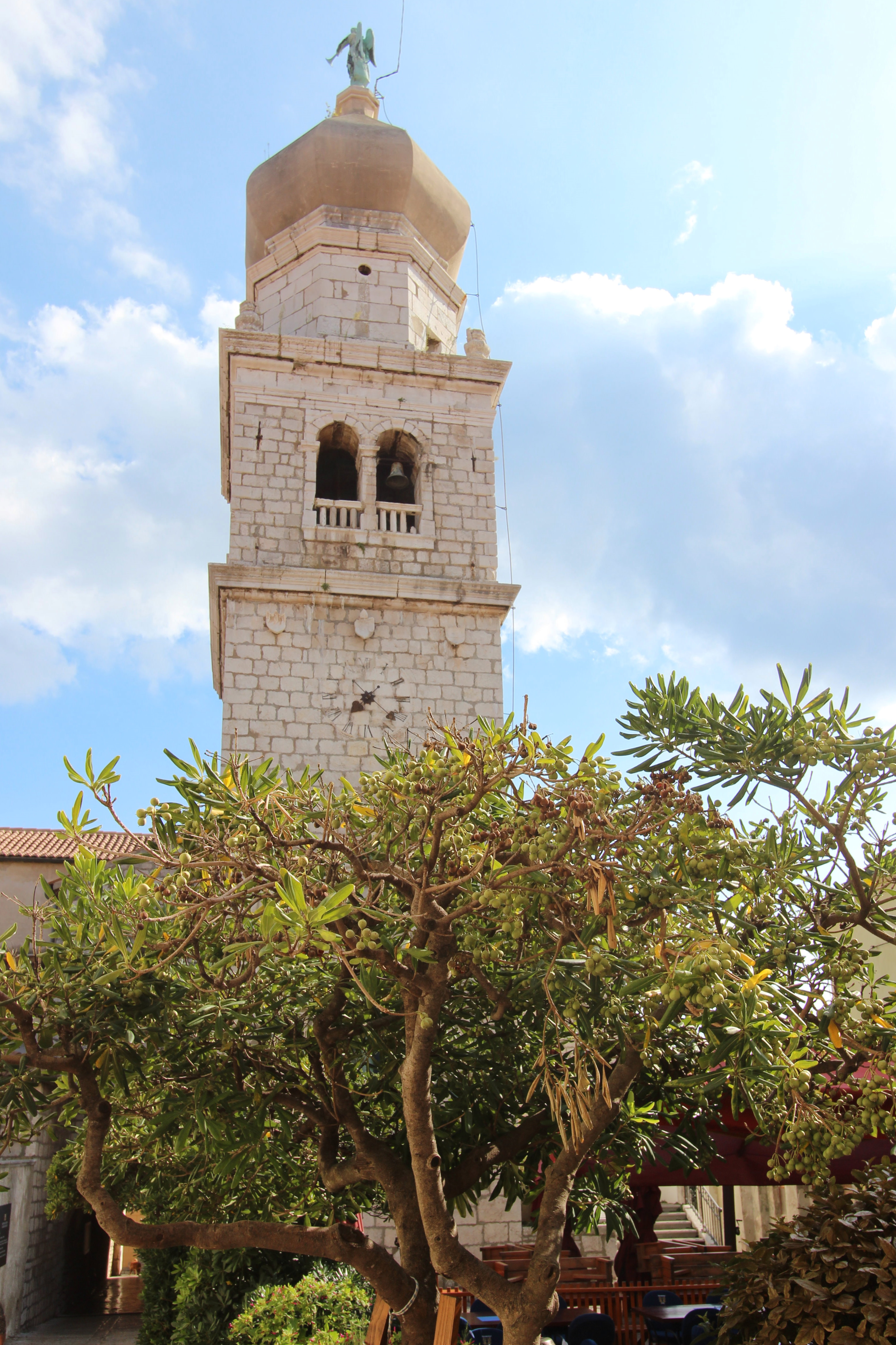
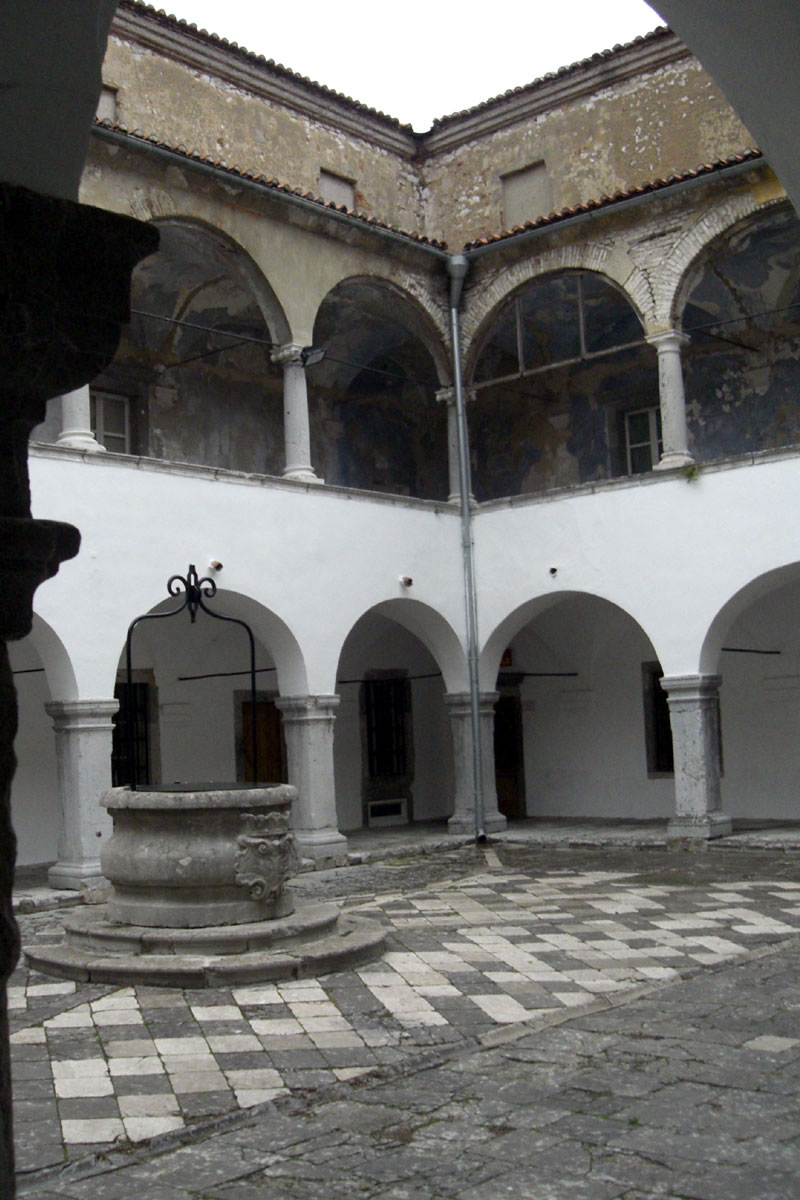
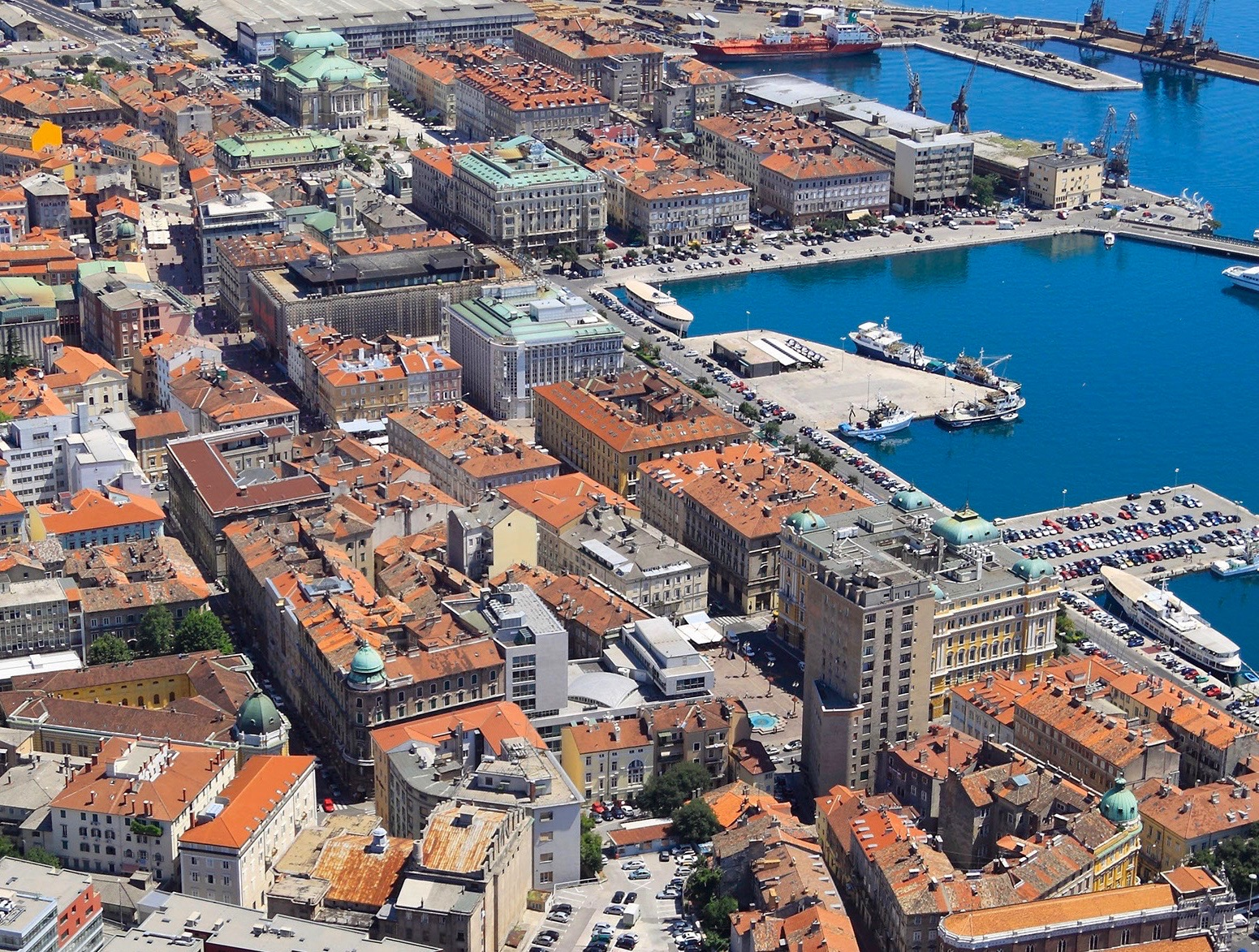
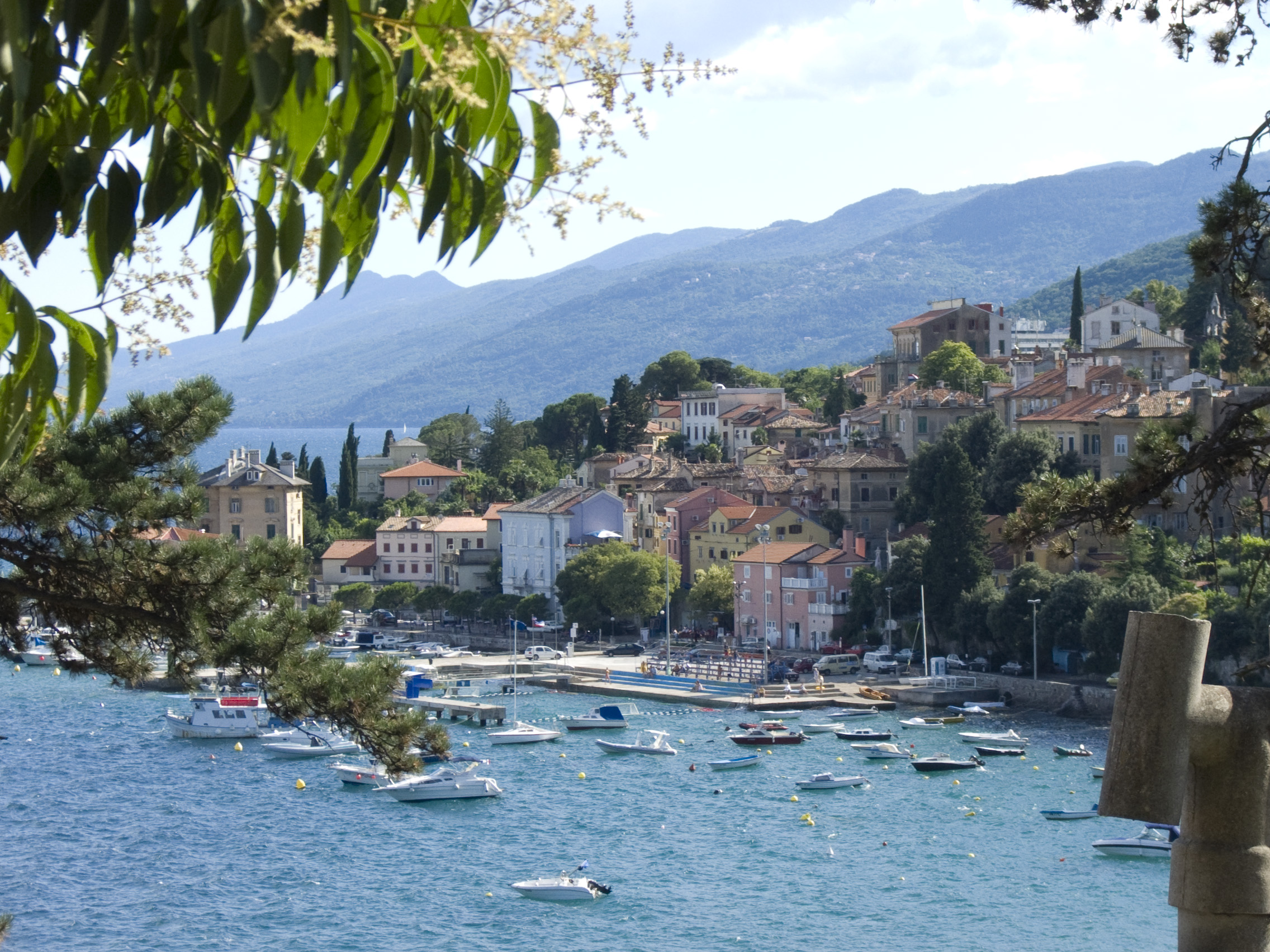
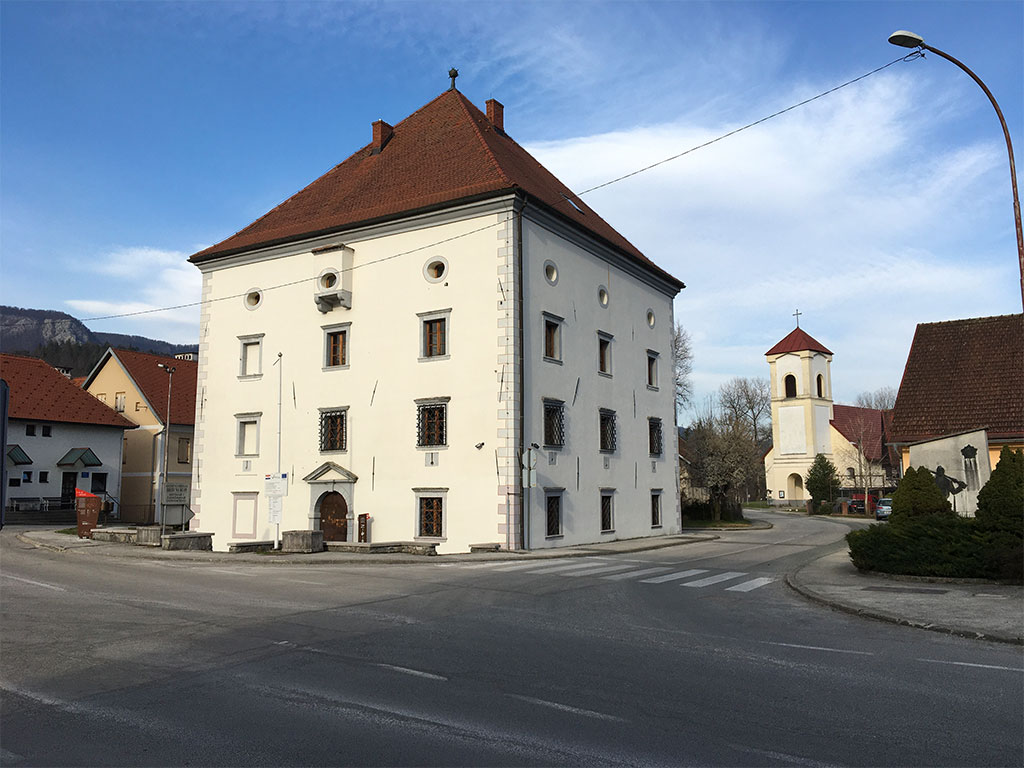
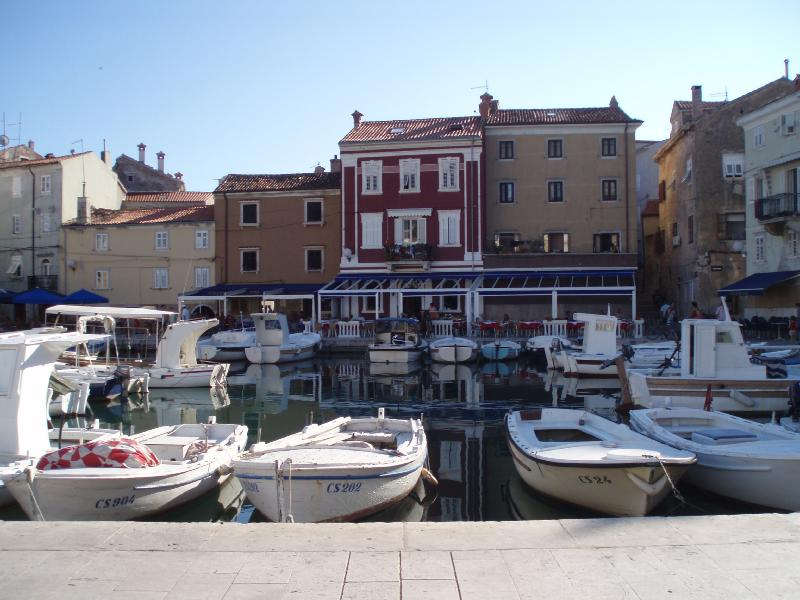

- Flag Coat of arms

- Primorje – Gorski Kotar County within Croatia
- Country: Croatia
- County seat: Rijeka

Government
  - Župan (Prefect): Ivica Lukanović (SDP)
  - County Council: 41 members: SDP, PGS, IDS, HSU, HSS (17); HDZ, HSLS (12); AM, Alternativa, UNIJA (5); Independents (3); MOST (2); Možemo!, ORaH (2)

Area
  - Total: 3,588 km^{2} (1,385 sq mi)

Population (2021)
  - Total: 266,183
  - Density: 74.19/km^{2} (192.1/sq mi)
- Area code: 051
- ISO 3166 code: HR-08
- HDI (2022): 0.906 very high · 2nd
- Website: www.pgz.hr

Primorje – Gorski Kotar County (Croatian: Primorsko-goranska županija, pronounced [prǐːmorsko-ɡǒranskaː ʒupǎnija]) is a county in west Croatia, most of it based in the historical and cultural region called Croatia proper and some of it in Istria, including the Bay of Kvarner, the surrounding Northern Croatian Littoral, and the mountainous region of Gorski Kotar. Its center is Rijeka. The county's population was 296,195 at the 2011 census.

The county includes the island territories of Krk, Cres, Lošinj and Rab. It borders Slovenia.

The county is divided:

- City of Rijeka (county seat)
- Town of Bakar
- Town of Cres
- Town of Crikvenica
- Town of Čabar
- Town of Delnice
- Town of Kastav
- Town of Kraljevica
- Town of Krk
- Town of Mali Lošinj
- Town of Novi Vinodolski
- Town of Opatija
- Town of Rab
- Town of Vrbovsko
- Municipality of Baška
- Municipality of Brod Moravice
- Municipality of Čavle
- Municipality of Dobrinj
- Municipality of Fužine
- Municipality of Jelenje
- Municipality of Klana
- Municipality of Kostrena
- Municipality of Lokve
- Municipality of Lopar
- Municipality of Lovran
- Municipality of Malinska-Dubašnica
- Municipality of Matulji
- Municipality of Mošćenička Draga
- Municipality of Mrkopalj
- Municipality of Omišalj
- Municipality of Punat
- Municipality of Ravna Gora
- Municipality of Skrad
- Municipality of Vinodol
- Municipality of Viškovo
- Municipality of Vrbnik

== Demographics ==
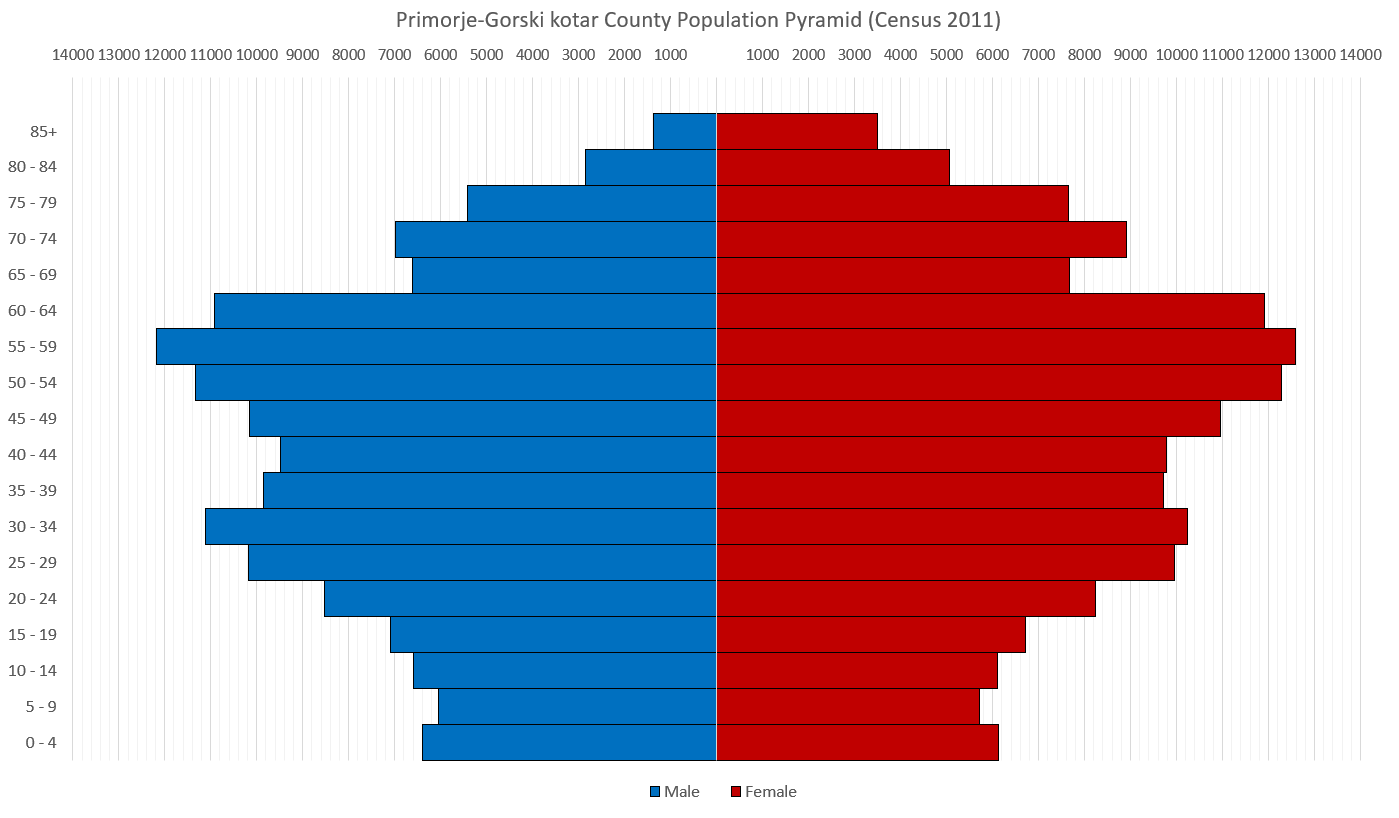
Population pyramid of Primorje – Gorski Kotar County per 2011 Census

Historical populations of Primorje – Gorski Kotar County

| Year | Pop. | ±% |
|---|---|---|
| 1857 | 165,503 | — |
| 1869 | 173,038 | +4.6% |
| 1880 | 179,246 | +3.6% |
| 1890 | 198,934 | +11.0% |
| 1900 | 217,653 | +9.4% |
| 1910 | 239,354 | +10.0% |
| 1921 | 223,640 | −6.6% |
| 1931 | 237,748 | +6.3% |
| 1948 | 207,635 | −12.7% |

| Year | Pop. | ±% |
|---|---|---|
| 1953 | 216,781 | +4.4% |
| 1961 | 240,621 | +11.0% |
| 1971 | 270,660 | +12.5% |
| 1981 | 304,038 | +12.3% |
| 1991 | 323,130 | +6.3% |
| 2001 | 305,505 | −5.5% |
| 2011 | 296,195 | −3.0% |
| 2021 | 266,183 | −10.1% |

Source: Naselja i stanovništvo Republike Hrvatske 1857–2001, Croatian Bureau of Statistics, Zagreb, 2005

According to the 2011 census, Primorje – Gorski Kotar County has a population of 296,195.

Primorje – Gorski Kotar County: Population trends 1857–2021
v

| population | 165503 | 173038 | 179246 | 198934 | 217653 | 239354 | 223640 | 237748 | 207635 | 216781 | 240621 | 270660 | 304038 | 323130 | 305505 | 296195 | 266183 |
| | 1857 | 1869 | 1880 | 1890 | 1900 | 1910 | 1921 | 1931 | 1948 | 1953 | 1961 | 1971 | 1981 | 1991 | 2001 | 2011 | 2021 |

Sources: Croatian Bureau of Statistics publications

Ethnic Croats make up the majority with 86.3% of the population, followed by Serbs at 5.0% and Italians 1,16%.

== County government ==
The current Prefect of Primorje-Gorski Kotar County is Ivica Lukanović (SDP), who was elected to the position in 2025, succeeding Zlatko Komadina.

The county assembly is composed of 44 representatives from the following political groups (as of 2025):

- elected on the SDP–PGS–IDS–HSS–RI list (15)
  - Social Democratic Party of Croatia (SDP): 8
  - Alliance of Primorje-Gorski Kotar (PGS): 4
  - Istrian Democratic Assembly (IDS), Croatian Peasant Party (HSS), List for Rijeka (RI): 3
- elected on the HDZ–HSLS–HDS–HNS list (11)
  - Croatian Democratic Union (HDZ), Croatian Social Liberal Party (HSLS)
- elected on the AM–UNIJA–CENTAR–HSU–FOKUS–ALTERNATIVA list (9)
  - Youth Action (AM): 3
  - Union of Kvarner (UNIJA): 3
  - Alternativa 101 (ALTERNATIVA), Croatian Party of Pensioners (HSU): 3
- elected on the MOST-DOMiNO-HSP-HS-BUZ list (3)
  - The Bridge (Most), Croatian Party of Rights (HSP): 2
  - Croatian People's Party (HNS): 1 (Note: elected as independent)
- elected on the Možemo! list (3)
  - We Can! (Možemo!)
- elected in the Serb national minority member by-election (1)
  - Independent Democratic Serb Party (SDSS)

== Protected areas ==
- Risnjak National Park
- Učka

== Gallery ==
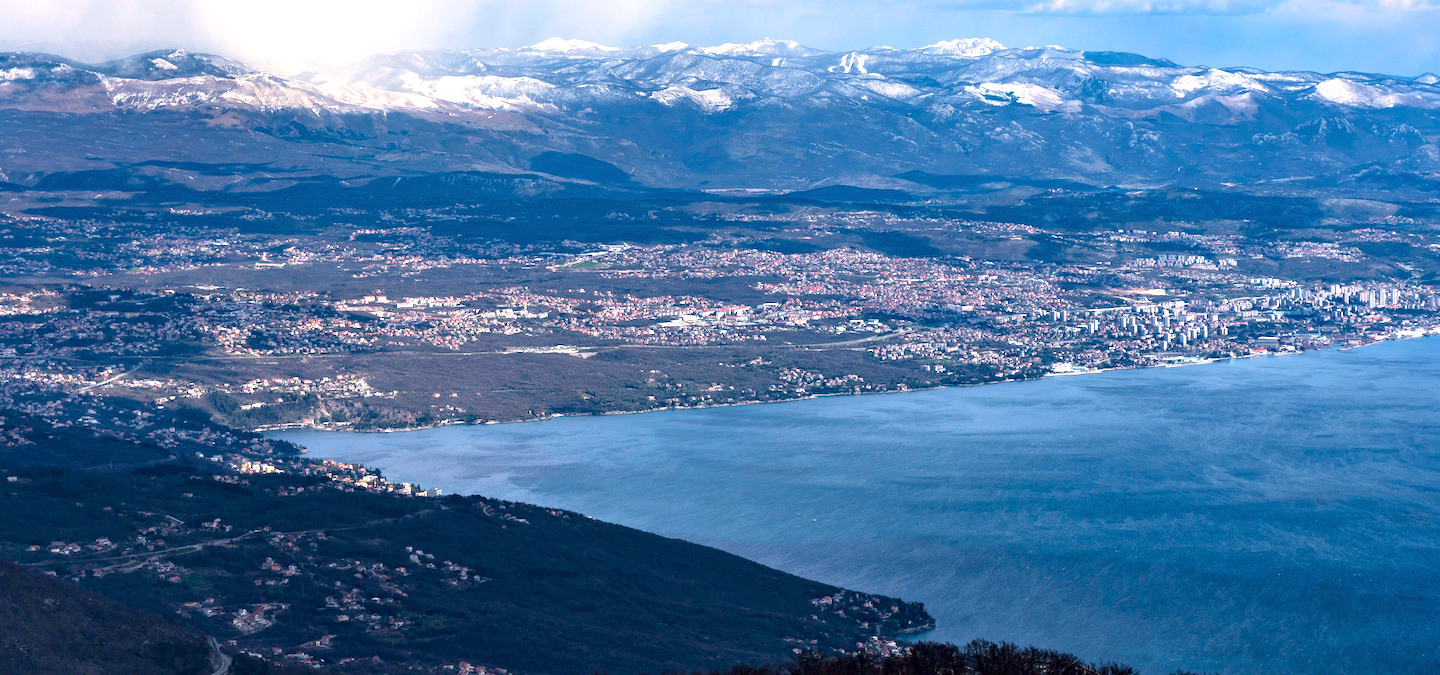
Rijeka Bay with the Adriatic Sea and Gorski Kotar mountains

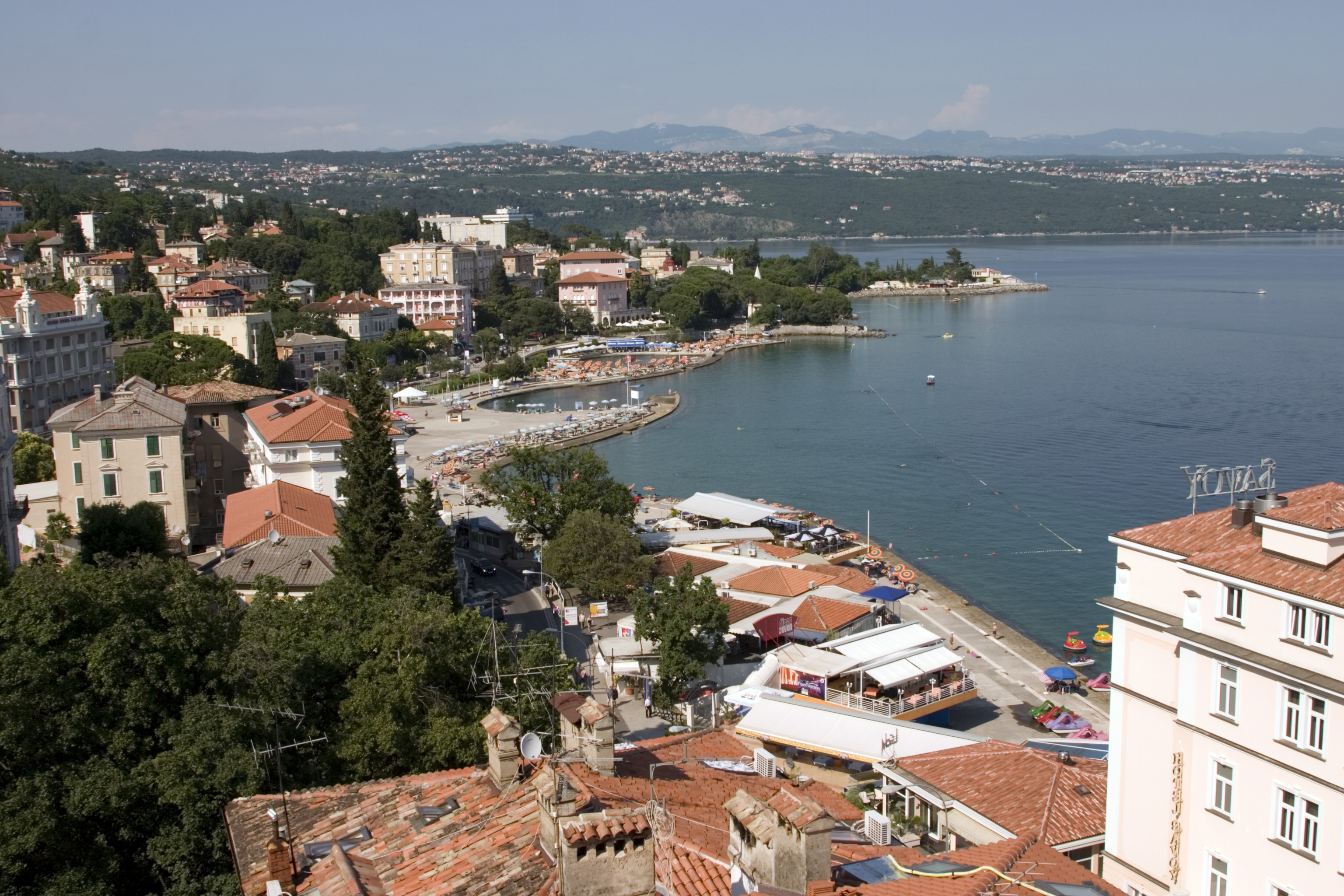
Opatija

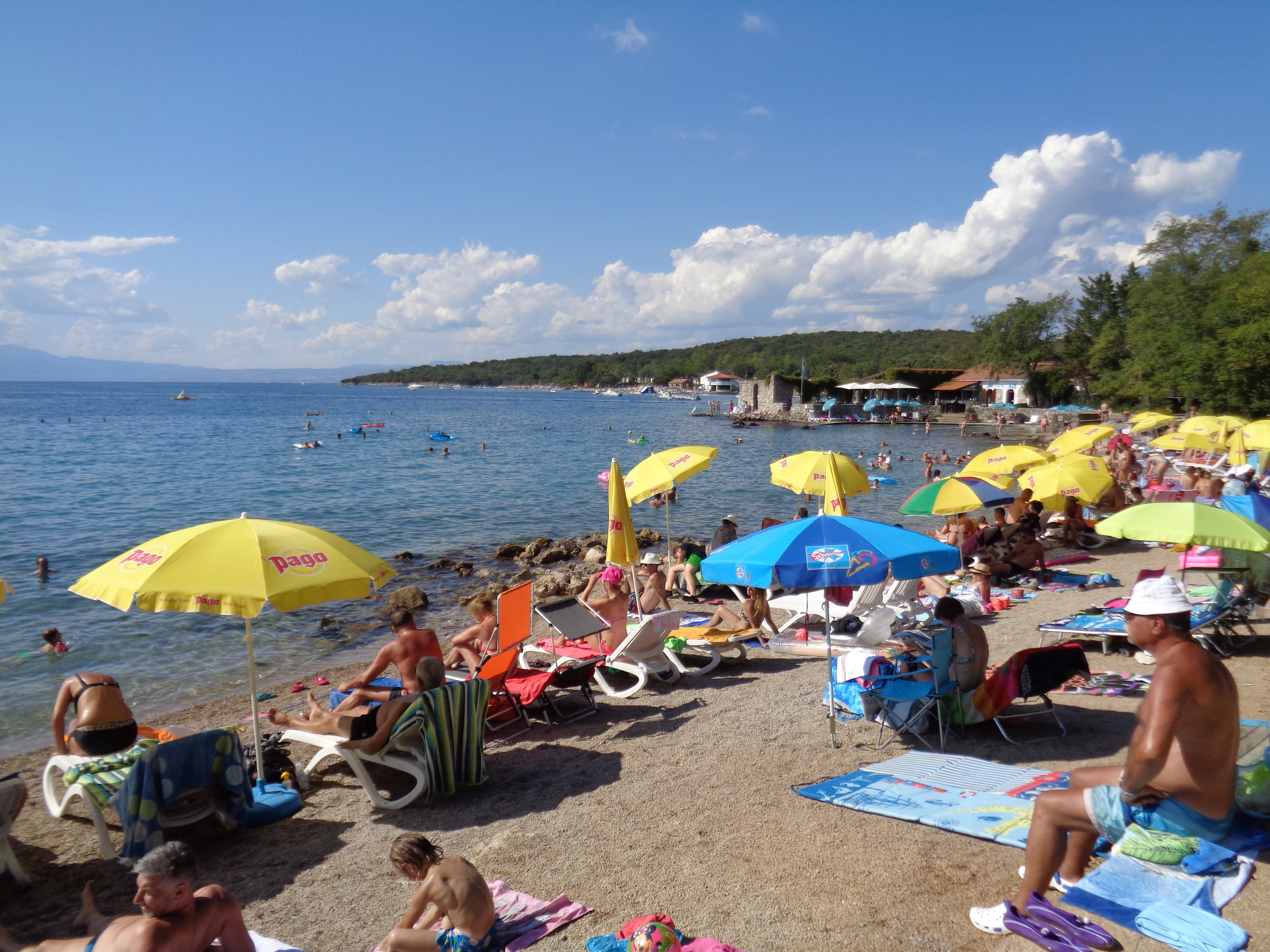
Njivice Beach, Omišalj

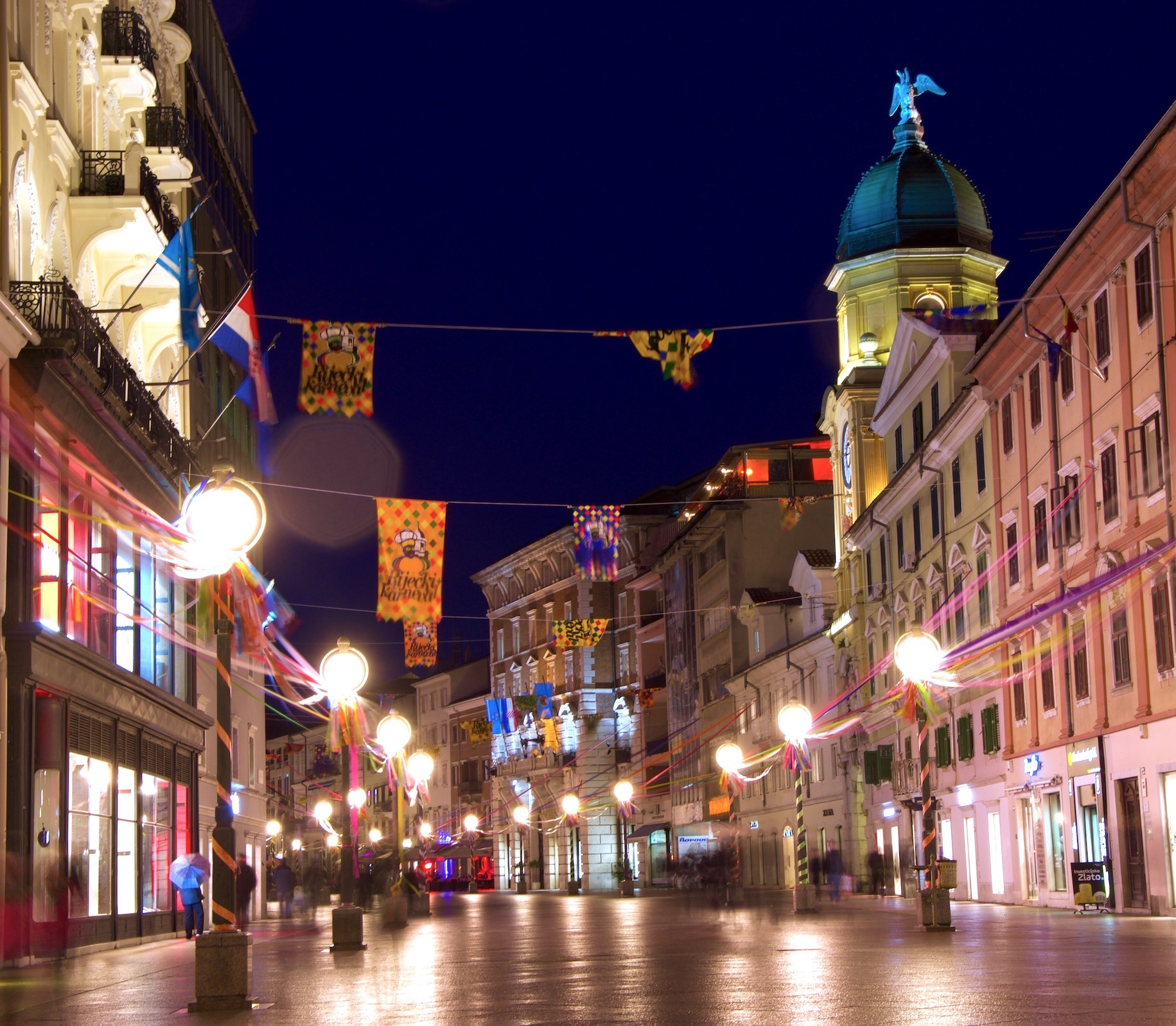
Rijeka

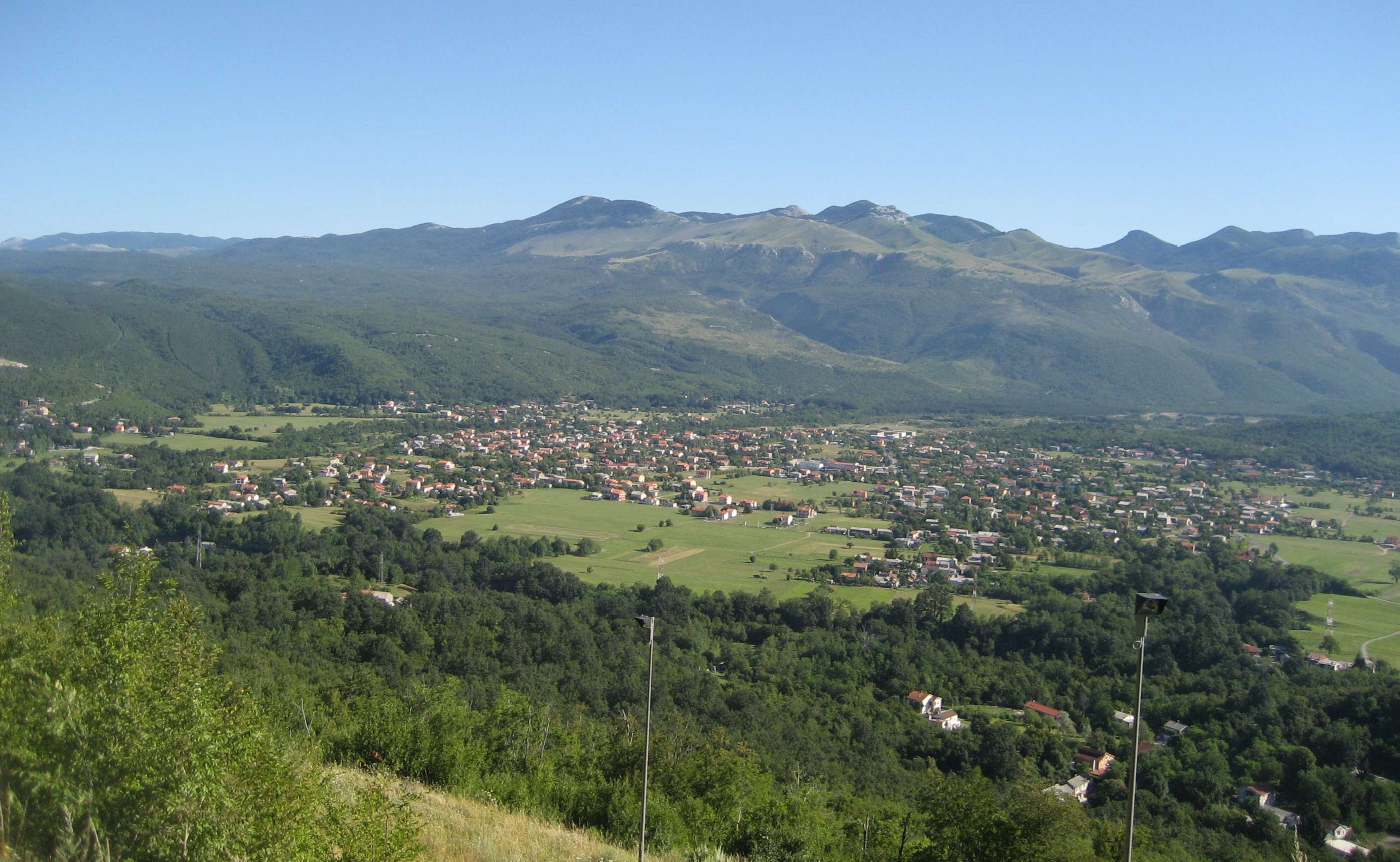
Dražice village, Jelenje

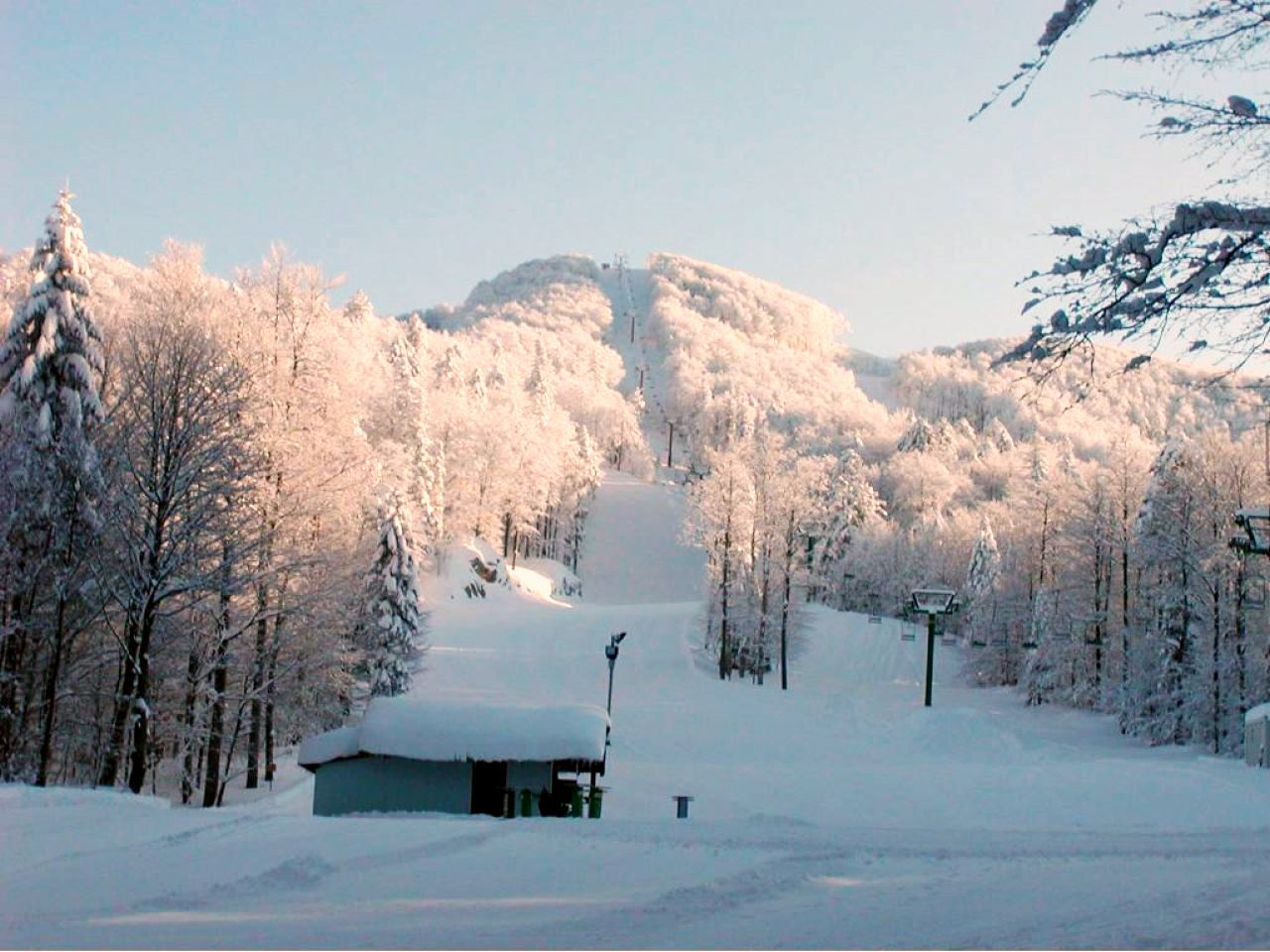
Platak

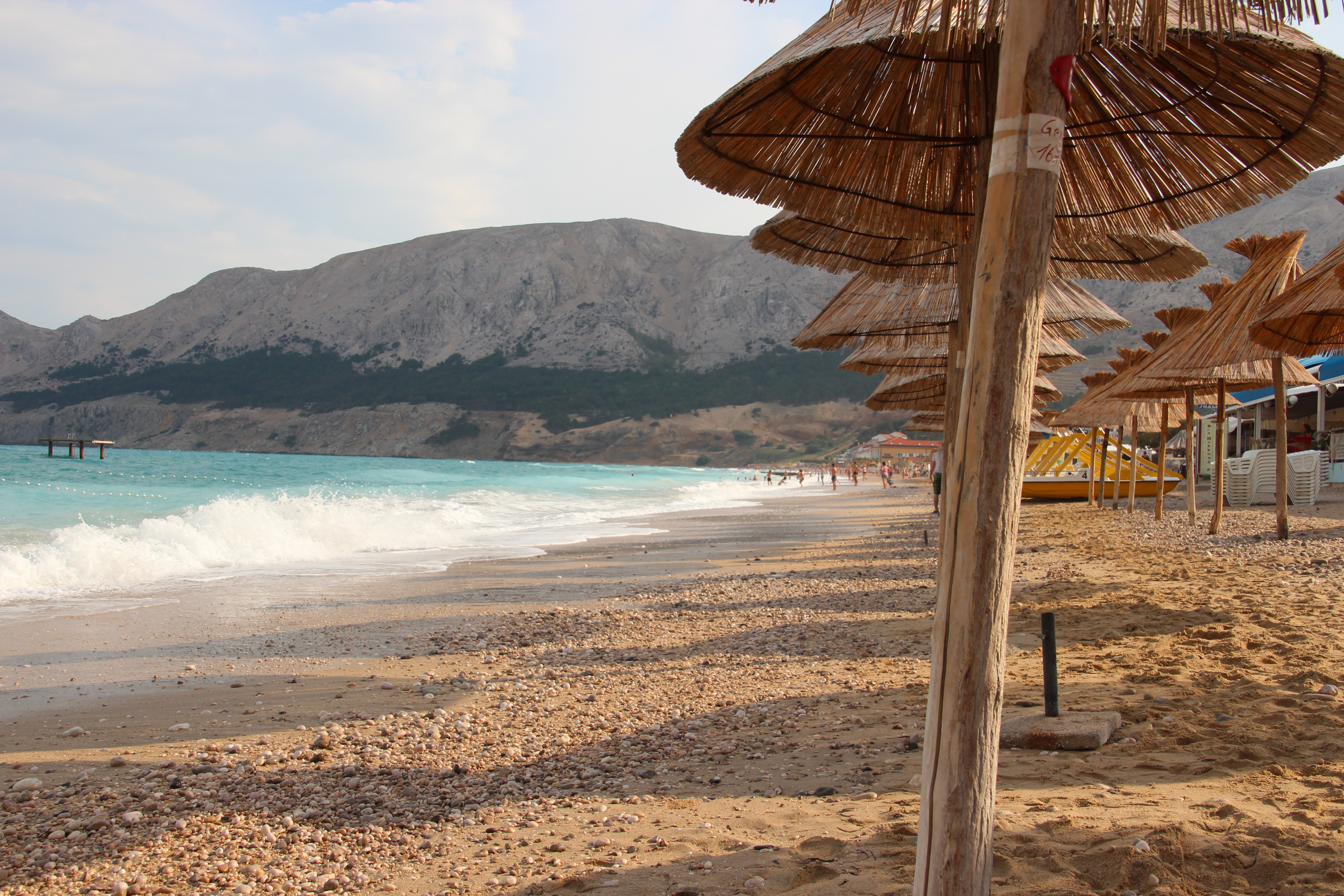
Baška

== See also ==
- Modruš-Rijeka County of the Kingdom of Croatia-Slavonia
