= Čabranka dialect =

Slovene dialect spoken around Brod na Kupi

- ˈČebranšku naˈrẹːčje
- Pronunciation: [ˈt͡ʃɛbɾanʃku naˈɾeːt͡ʃjɛ]
- Native to: Slovenia
- Region: Northern Lower Carniola
- Ethnicity: Slovenes
- Language family: Indo-European: Balto-Slavic; Slavic; South Slavic; Western South Slavic; Slovene; Lower Carniolan dialect group; Čabranka dialect
- Dialects: Bajtarji microdialects; Gebarji microdialects; Dragarji microdialects

Language codes
- ISO 639-3: –
- Čabranka dialect

The Čabranka dialect (Slovene: čabranško narečje [t͡ʃaˈbɾaːnʃkɔ naˈɾeːt͡ʃjɛ], čebranško narečje), also known in Croatian literature as western microdialects of the Western Goran subdialect (Serbo-Croatian: zapadni goranski poddijalekt, zapadni gorskokotarski poddijalekt, Slovene: zahodni goranski govori, zahodni gorskokotarski govori), is a dialect spoken along the Upper Kupa Valley and in Gorski Kotar in Slovenia and Croatia. The dialect originates from Alpine Slavic, a predecessor of modern Slovene, but speakers living in Croatia self-identify as speaking Croatian. The dialect borders the Lower Carniolan dialect to the north, the Mixed Kočevje subdialects to the northeast, the Kostel dialect to the southeast, the Eastern Goran dialect to the south, and various Chakavian dialects to the southwest and west. The dialect belongs to the Lower Carniolan dialect group, and it evolved from the Lower Carniolan dialect base. Until recently, the Čabranka dialect was considered to be part of the Kostel dialect, but it was later discovered that both dialects had evolved differently but are in the process of becoming more similar to each other. Despite the new name, it is still often referred to as the Western Kostel microdialects.

== Geographical distribution ==
The Čabranka dialect is mainly spoken in Croatia; however, the northeastern part crosses the border between Croatia and Slovenia. The area extends from Babno Polje and Lazec in the north along the Gotenica Mountains (Goteniška gora) to Mirtoviči and Gašparci in the east. It extends south to Delnice and extends west to Gorski Kotar. Notable settlements include Babno Polje, Lazec, Novi Kot, Draga, and Osilnica in Slovenia, as well as Prezid, Kozji Vrh, Gorači, Čabar, Crni Lazi, Tršće, Plešce, Vode, Gerovo, Mali Lazi, and Crni Lug in Croatia.

== Accentual changes ==
The Čabranka dialect lost the difference between high- and low-pitched accent on both long and short vowels, which are still differentiated, but in the process of merging in the Čabar, Hrvatsko, and Bosljiva Loka microdialects. It also underwent five accentual changes that are not found in all Slovene dialects: the *ženȁ → *žèna, *məglȁ → *mə̀gla, *sěnȏ / *prosȏ → *sě̀no / *pròso, *visȍk → vìsok, and *kováč → *kòvač accent shifts. Some Bajtarji microdialects have also undergone the *ropotȁt → *ròpotat accent shift. The northwesternmost microdialects of Babno Polje and Prezid have also undergone the shift *gospodár → *gòspodar in a few words. Newly accented vowels have usually been majorly reduced, and akanye is common.

== Phonology ==
Monophthongization of vowels is present; however in contrast to the Kostel dialect, diphthongs are still present:

- Non-final *ě̀ and *ě̄ diphthongized into ẹːi̯, which later monophthongized to ẹː or ėː in some microdialects.
- The vowel *ō is rarely pronounced as a diphthong; it mostly simplified into ọː, ȯː, or u.
- Non-final *è and ē, as well as non-final *ę̀ and ę̄, are pronounced as a diphthong only in the northernmost and southernmost microdialects; elsewhere it monophthongized into ẹː or iː.
- Similarly, non-final *ò and ǫ̀, as well as ǭ, are pronounced as a diphthong only in the Babno Polje and Delnice dialects; elsewhere it monophthongized into ọː or ȯː.
- Newly stressed *e and *o after the *ženȁ → *žèna shift mostly remained a diphthong i̯eː and u̯oː, or simplified into eː and oː, respectively.
- Non-final *ə̀ and *ə̄ turned into aː.
- Non-final *à and *ā turned into aː almost everywhere.
- Non-final *ì and *ī became either long or short i.
- Non-final *ù and *ū became either long or short u or even ü.
- Non-final *l̥̀ and *l̥̄ mostly evolved into ọːu̯ or u.
- Non-final *r̥̀ and r̥̄ mostly evolved into ər.

Akanye is also common, as well as e-akanye in the prefix ne-. Ukanye is also present, turning word-final o into ȯ or u. Unstressed *u is often reduced into ü or i. Unstressed *ə evolved into e̥, ọ, ə, or a.

Word-finally and before consonants, *l almost everywhere turned into u̯ or u. Shvapanye (*l → u̯ before central and back consonants) is also common, but not before *u. Palatal *ĺ mostly depalatalized. Palatal *ń depalatalized at the beginning of a word. Final *m turned into *n. Alpine Slovene *w evolved into many different sounds:

- Before a non-voiced (rarely also voiced) non-sonorant, it became f.
- Prothetic v appeared before u at the beginning of a word.
- Prothetic u̯ appeared before o at the beginning of a word.
- The cluster zv- simplified into zg-.
- Southern microdialects simplified *u̯m- into *xm-.
- It disappeared at the beginning of a word if followed by d, s, z, or p.

The sonorant j appears at the beginning of words that start with i and sometimes in between a vowel and a consonant. Some microdialects pronounce tl-/tn- as kl-/kn-. The consonant *x is also often simplified into f or š.

== Morphology ==
Dual forms have been fully replaced by plural endings in declension; verbs have archaic dual forms. The infinitive was replaced by the supine, and the pluperfect is still in use. The imperative can be alternatively formed with pojdi + infinitive, or dajmo + infinitive for the first person plural.

== Further division ==
The Čabranka dialect is further divided into three groups: the Bajtarji, Dragarji, and Gebarji microdialects. The Dragarji microdialects lack shvapanye and are the smallest group, spoken in Lazec, Srednja Vas pri Dragi, Trava, and Čabar. These speakers are thought to have moved here from inner Slovenia. The Bajtarji microdialects have undergone the most vowel reduction; akanye is very common, as well as the shifts *xiša → šiša, *žejən → *žejgən, etc. This group covers the largest area, from Babno Polje in the north to Gerovo and Osilnica in the south. South of the Bajtarji microdialects are the Gebarji microdialects, which have not undergone as much vowel reduction; akanye is only present in pretonic syllables.

== Bibliography ==
- Gostenčnik, Januška (2019). "Slovenski jezik ob Čabranki, zgornji Kolpi in v Gorskem kotarju". Slovenski jezik in njegovi sosedje (PDF). Zveza društev Slavistično društvo Slovenije. pp. 165–174. ISBN 978-961-6715-29-4.
- Gostenčnik, Januška (2018). Krajevni govori ob Čabranki in zgornji Kolpi. Založba ZRC. ISBN 978-961-05-0081-0.
- Smole, Marko (2010). "Govori ob Čabranki in zgornji Kolpi". Digitalna enciklopedija naravne in kulturne dediščine na Slovenskem. Archived from the original on 2011-12-01.
- Ramovš, Fran (1935). Historična gramatika slovenskega jezika [Historical grammar of the Sloene language]. VII. Dialekti (in Slovenian). Ljubljana: Znanstveno društvo za humanistične vede v Ljubljani.

=== Morphology ===
- Rigler, Elena (2018-09-26). Tvorba umanjenica u govoru Tršća (Thesis). Rijeka: Sveučilište u Rijeci, Filozofski fakultet (published 2020-07-24).
- Malnar Jurišić, Marija (2017-09-01). "Iz morfologije govora Tršća". Hrvatski dijalektološki zbornik. 21 (21): 203–216. doi:10.21857/m3v76tzgwy. eISSN 2459-4849.
- Arh, Branka, ed. (1998). Tršće. Zagreb. ISBN 953976520X. Includes a grammar by Gabrijela Polović.
- Lipovec, Albinca (1979–1980). "Verbalizirana pritrdilnica (nikalnica) v govoru Babnega Polja". Jezik in slovstvo. 25 (7/8) (published 1980): 209–213. ISSN 0021-6933.

=== Phonology ===
- Gostenčnik, Januška (2013). "Fonološki opis grada Gerovo (prema zapisu Božidara Finke)". Slavia Centralis. 6 (1): 38–58. ISSN 2385-8753.
- Malnar, Marija (2013-05-24) [received 2012-09-05]. "Fonologija govora Tršća u Gorskom kotaru". Jezikoslovlje. 14 (1): 101–128. eISSN 1848-9001.
- Malnar, Marija (2012). Fonološki opis čabarskih govora na frazeološkom korpusu (Thesis). Zagreb: Sveučilište u Zagrebu, Filozofski fakultet.
- Malnar, Marija (2009-04-21). Fonologija crnoluškoga govora (Thesis). Rijeka: Sveučilište u Rijeci, Filozofski fakultet.
- Malnar, Marija (2005-10-12). Fonetsko-fonološki i morfološki opis tršćanskog govora (Thesis). Zagreb: Sveučilište u Zagrebu, Filozofski fakultet.
- Małecki, Mieczysław (1929). Cakawizm z uwzględnieniem zjawisk podobnych. Prace Komisji Językowej Polskiej Akademii Umiejętności. Vol. 14. Translated as Małecki, Mieczysław (2007). "Cakavizam i njemu slične pojave". Čakavske studije Mieczysława Małeckoga. Translated by Kryżan-Stanojević, Barbara; Nosić, Milan. Maveda. pp. 5–89. ISBN 978-953-7029-06-7.
  - Review: Lisac, Josip (2007-11-30). "ČAKAVSKE STUDIJE MIECZYSŁAWA MAŁECKOGA (Mieczysław Małecki: ČAKAVSKE STUDIJE, Maveda, Rijeka, 2007.)". Čakavska rič: Polugodišnjak za proučavanje čakavske riječi. 35 (2): 431–432. ISSN 0350-7831.

=== Lexicology ===
- Malnar, Slavko (2020). Idrijsko–cerkljansko-čabranski primerjalni slovar. Matica hrvatska, Ogranak Matice hrvatske u Čabru. ISBN 978-953-7541-67-5.
- Malnar, Slavko (2014). Rječnik govora čabarskog kraja (2nd ed.). Matica hrvatska. ISBN 978-953-7541-40-8.
  - Review: Mueller, Jakob (2022) [published 2014]. "Slavko Malnar, RJEČNIK GOVORA ČABARSKOG KRAJA: Iz osvrta Jakoba Muellera".
- Nosić, Milan (2013). Goranska prezimena. Maveda. ISBN 9789537029319.
- Malnar, Slavko (2011). Hišna imena in vzdevki v župniji Tršće. Svet slovenske narodne manjšine Primorsko-goranske županije. ISBN 9789535665311.
- Malnar, Marija (2011-12-15). "Somatska frazeologija čabarskih govora". Rasprave: Časopis Instituta za hrvatski jezik i jezikoslovlje. 37 (1): 101–119. ISSN 1849-0379.
- Malnar, Slavko (2008). Rječnik govora čabarskog kraja (1st ed.). Matica hrvatska, Ogranak u Čabru. ISBN 978-953-7541-08-8.
- Malnar, Slavko (2002). Pamejnek: Govor u čabarskom kraju (PDF). Čavle. ISBN 953-97510-7-1. Tirage: 400.
- Lisac, Josip (1989-03-13). "Problem obrađenosti leksika goranskih govora". Hrvatski dijalektološki zbornik (8): 61–68. ISSN 0439-691X.
- Mlakar-Piken, Bogdan; Pavlin-Štanfol, Josip (1978). "Prezidanskohrvatski rječnik". Lizdaj. No. 6. Second edition prepared by Bogdan Mlakar.
  - Review: Lisac, Josip (2007-11-30). "Goranska dijalektalna leksikografija". Čakavska rič: Polugodišnjak za proučavanje čakavske riječi. 35 (2): 405–410. ISSN 0350-7831.

=== Phraseology ===
- Malnar, Marija; Vukša Nahod, Perina (2015). "O čovjeku ukratko - konceptualna analiza frazema čabarskih govora". Jezikoslovni Zapiski. 21 (1): 121–136. eISSN 1581-1255.
- Malnar Jurišić, Marija (2014). "Ukratko o frazeologiji govora Tršća". Goranski zbornik. Vol. 2. pp. 180–187. ISBN 978-953-7453-05-3. ISBN 978-953-7541-45-3
- Malnar, Marija; Muhvič, Tanja (2013). "Somatska frazeologija kostelskega in goranskega narečja". Phraseology in Interlingual and Intercultural Contact. Mednarodna Založba Oddelka za Slovanske Jezike in Književnosti, Filozofska Fakulteta. pp. 301–316. ISBN 978-961-6930-03-1.
- Malnar, Marija (2011). "Poredbeni frazemi u čabarskim govorima". Filologija (57) (published 2012-03-13): 155–173. eISSN 1848-8919.
- Malnar, Marija; Menac-Mihalić, Mira (2011) [presented 2009-04]. "Novo u tršćanskoj frazeologiji". 1. Međimurski filološki dani. pp. 33–39. ISBN 978-953-7210-48-9.
- Malnar, Marija (2011). "Iz frazeologije čabarskih govora". Kajkavski u povijesnom i sadašnjem obzorju. pp. 173–179. ISBN 978-953-7832-06-3.

=== Dialectal literature ===
- Skok, Joža, ed. (1999). Rieči sa zviranjka: antologija moderne kajkavske lirike 20. stoljeća. Tipex. ISBN 953-6022-30-3.
  - Review: Begović, Sead (2016). "Rieči sa zviranjka: antologija moderne kajkavske lirike 20. stoljeća / [priredio] Joža Skok; ilustracije Ivan Lacković Croata. Zagreb, 1999.". Joža Skok: prilozi povijesti hrvatske kajkavske i dječje književnosti. pp. 199–200. ISBN 978-953-8020-53-7.
- Primc, Jože (1997). Okamneli mož (in druge zgodbe iz Zgornje Kolpske doline). Kmečki glas. ISBN 961-203-127-4.
- Pochobradsky, Zlatko (1980). Bejle gauob.
- Medved, J. (1924–1925). "Bilješke iz čabarskog kraja". Nastavni vjesnik. 33 (published 1925): 310–315.

=== Conservation ===
- Buneta, Sara (2022-06-30). Zavičajni govor Čabra u odgojnom radu s djecom predškolske dobi (Thesis). Rijeka: Sveučilište u Rijeci, Učiteljski fakultet.
- Smole, Marko (2013). "Ohranjanje in predstavitev lokalnih govorov na čezmejnem območju v dolini zgornje Kolpe in Čabranke". Glasnik Slovenskega etnološkega društva. 53 (34): 110–112. eISSN 2536-4324.
- Malnar, Slavko (2011). "Očuvanje lokalnoga govora na području Čabra". Kajkavski u povijesnom i sadašnjem obzorju. pp. 181–185. ISBN 978-953-7832-06-3.

=== Subdialects ===
- Gostenčnik, Januška (2016-12-06). "Krajevni govori od Babnega Polja do Bosljive Loke". Slavistična revija. 64 (3): 341–363. eISSN 1855-7570.
- Gostenčnik, Januška (2014). "Primerjava govorov Babnega Polja in Ravnic v luči starejših in mlajših slovenskih jezikovnih sprememb". Jezikoslovni Zapiski. 20 (2): 25–46. eISSN 1581-1255.
- Raušel, Sanja (2000-02-28). Mjesni govor Gerova (Thesis). Rijeka: Sveučilište u Rijeci, Filozofski fakultet.
- Strohal, Rudolf (1903). "Osobine današnjega delničkoga narječja". Rad Jugoslavenske akademije znanosti i umjetnosti: Razredi historičko-filologički i filosofičko-juridički. 60 (153): 115–208. ISSN 1333-6037.

=== Evolutionary ===
- Gostenčnik, Januška (2020). "Kostelsko narečje dolenjske narečne skupine" (PDF). Zbornik Slavističnega društva Slovenije. 30: 137–148. ISSN 1408-3043.
- Šekli, Matej (2018). "Topologija lingvogenez slovanskih jezikov". In Legan Ravnikar, Andreja (ed.). Collection Linguistica et philologica (in Slovenian). Translated by Plotnikova, Anastasija. Ljubljana: Znanstvenoraziskovalni center SAZU. ISBN 978-961-05-0137-4.
- Malnar, Marija (2013-08-19). "Sjeverni dio gorskokotarske kajkavštine nekad i danas". Hrvatski dijalektološki zbornik. 18: 47–59. eISSN 2459-4849.
- Malnar Jurišić, Marija; Vukša Nahod, Perina (2012). "Postoje li čakavski elementi u fonologiji čabarskih govora". Peti hrvatski slavistički kongres: zbornik radova. Filozofski Fakultet. pp. 319–328. ISBN 978-953-6104-83-3.
- Lisac, Josip (1997) [received 1999-05-15]. "Povijesna podloga goranskoga dijalekatnog stanja". Radovi Filozofskog fakulteta u Zadru, razdio filoloških znanosti. 36(26) (11) (published 1999): 51–61. ISSN 0352-6712. Reprinted as Lisac, Josip (2003). "Povijesna podloga goranskoga dijalekatnog stanja". Zbornik Stjepanu Antoljaku u čast. Hrvatski državni arhiv. pp. 137–148. ISBN 953-6005-56-5.
