= D305 road =

Road in Croatia

D305 state road

Route information
- Length: 4.9 km (3.0 mi)

Major junctions
- From: Čabar
- To: D32 in Parg

Location
- Country: Croatia
- Counties: Primorje-Gorski Kotar
- Major cities: Čabar

Highway system
- Highways in Croatia

D305 is a state road in Gorski Kotar region of Croatia connecting Čabar to D32 state road leading to Delnice, and the A6 motorway Delnice interchange. The road is 4.9 km (3.0 mi) long.

The road, as well as all other state roads in Croatia, is managed and maintained by Hrvatske ceste, state owned company.

== History ==
On 12 December 2017, a severe wind hit the D305, blocking traffic along it.

== Road junctions and populated areas ==
D305 junctions/populated areas
| Type | Slip roads/Notes |
| | Čabar; Ž5031 to Plešce, Zamost and Hrvatsko. L58001 to Gornji Žagar. The eastern terminus of the road. |
| | Tropeti |
| | Parg; D32 to Prezid border crossing to Slovenia (to the north) and to Delnice (to the south). The western terminus of the road. |
