= D32 road (Croatia) =

Road in Croatia

D32 state road

Route information
- Length: 49.7 km (30.9 mi)

Major junctions
- From: Prezid border crossing to Slovenia
- D305 in Parg
- To: D3 in Delnice

Location
- Country: Croatia
- Counties: Primorje-Gorski Kotar
- Major cities: Delnice

Highway system
- Highways in Croatia

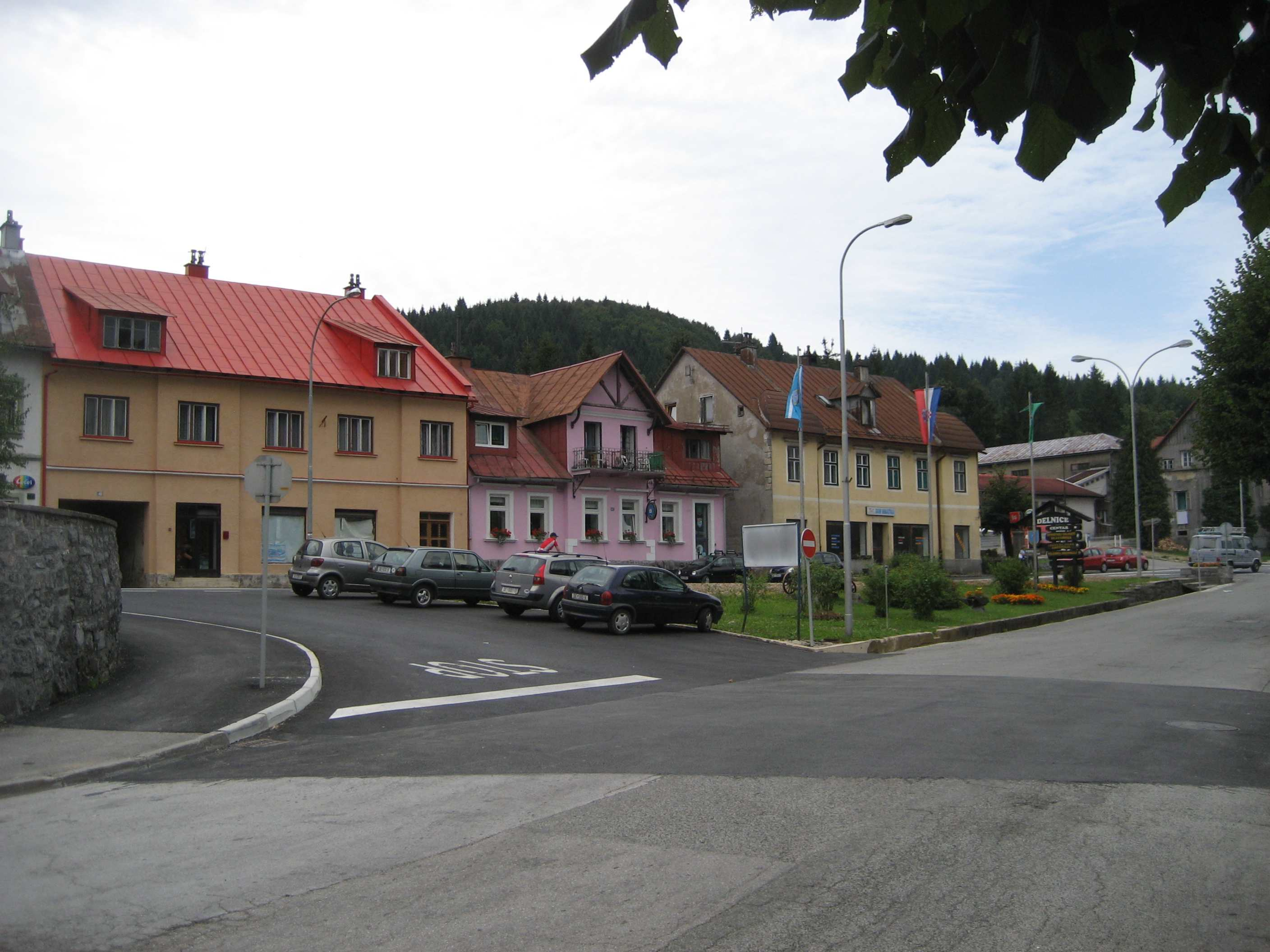
Delnice, at the southern terminus of the D32 road

D32 is a state road in Gorski Kotar region of Croatia connecting Prezid and nearby border crossing to Slovenia to D3 state road in Delnice, and the road also serves as a connecting road to the A6 motorway as it terminates near Delnice interchange. The road is 49.7 km (30.9 mi) long.

The road, as well as all other state roads in Croatia, is managed and maintained by Hrvatske ceste, state owned company.

== History ==
On 12 December 2017, a severe wind hit the D32, blocking traffic along it.

== Traffic volume ==
Traffic is regularly counted and reported by Hrvatske ceste, operator of the road. Substantial variations between annual (AADT) and summer (ASDT) traffic volumes are attributed to the fact that the road serves as an approach to the Croatian A6 motorway carrying considerable tourist traffic.

D32 traffic volume
Road	Counting site	AADT	ASDT	Notes
D32	1701 Prezid	695	872	Between the border crossing and the D305 junction.
D32	1702 Smrečje	700	847	Adjacent to the Ž5185 junction.
D32	2903 Crni Lug	575	703	Between the Ž5032 and the D3 junctions.

== Road junctions and populated areas ==
D32 junctions/populated areas
Type	Slip roads/Notes
	Prezid border crossing to Slovenia. Slovenian route 213 to Cerknica, Slovenia. The northern terminus of the road.
	Prezid
	Kozji Vrh
	Gorači
	Parg; D305 to Čabar.
	Brinjeva Draga
	Makov Hrib
	Tršće
	Prhci
	Smrečje
	Mali Lug; Ž5185 to Zamost.
	Gerovo
	Gerovski Kraj
	Malo Selo
	Crni Lug; Ž5032 to Gornje Jelenje (D3).
	Delnice; D3 to A6 motorway Delnice interchange and Rijeka (to the west) and to Karlovac (to the east). The southern terminus of the road.
