= Prezid =

Prezid may refer to:

- Prezid, Slovenia, a village in Slovenia
- Prezid, Croatia, a village in Croatia
