= Smrečje =

Smrečje may refer to:

- Smrečje, Croatia, a village near Čabar, Croatia
- Smrečje, Vrhnika, a settlement in the Municipality of Vrhnika, Slovenia
- Smrečje v Črni, a settlement in the Municipality of Kamnik, Slovenia
