= Lautari =

Lautari may refer to:

- Lăutari, Romanian Romani musicians
- Lautari, Croatia, a village near Čabar
