= Makov Hrib =

Coordinates: 45°35′N 14°38′E

- Village
- Interactive map of Makov Hrib
- Country: Croatia
- County: Primorje-Gorski Kotar County
- Municipality: Čabar

Area
  - Total: 0.9 km^{2} (0.35 sq mi)

Population (2021)
  - Total: 89
  - Density: 99/km^{2} (260/sq mi)
- Time zone: UTC+1 (CET)
  - Summer (DST): UTC+2 (CEST)

Makov Hrib is a Croatian village in Primorje-Gorski Kotar County. The village is connected by the D32 highway.

== Geography ==
It lies above the section of Prhutova Draga called Ponikve.

== Sports ==
Beginning in 2013, the 7 stage 260 kilometres (160 mi) long Cycling Trail of Gorski Kotar (Croatian: Goranska biciklistička transverzala) passes through Makov Hrib.
