= Jerinov Grič =

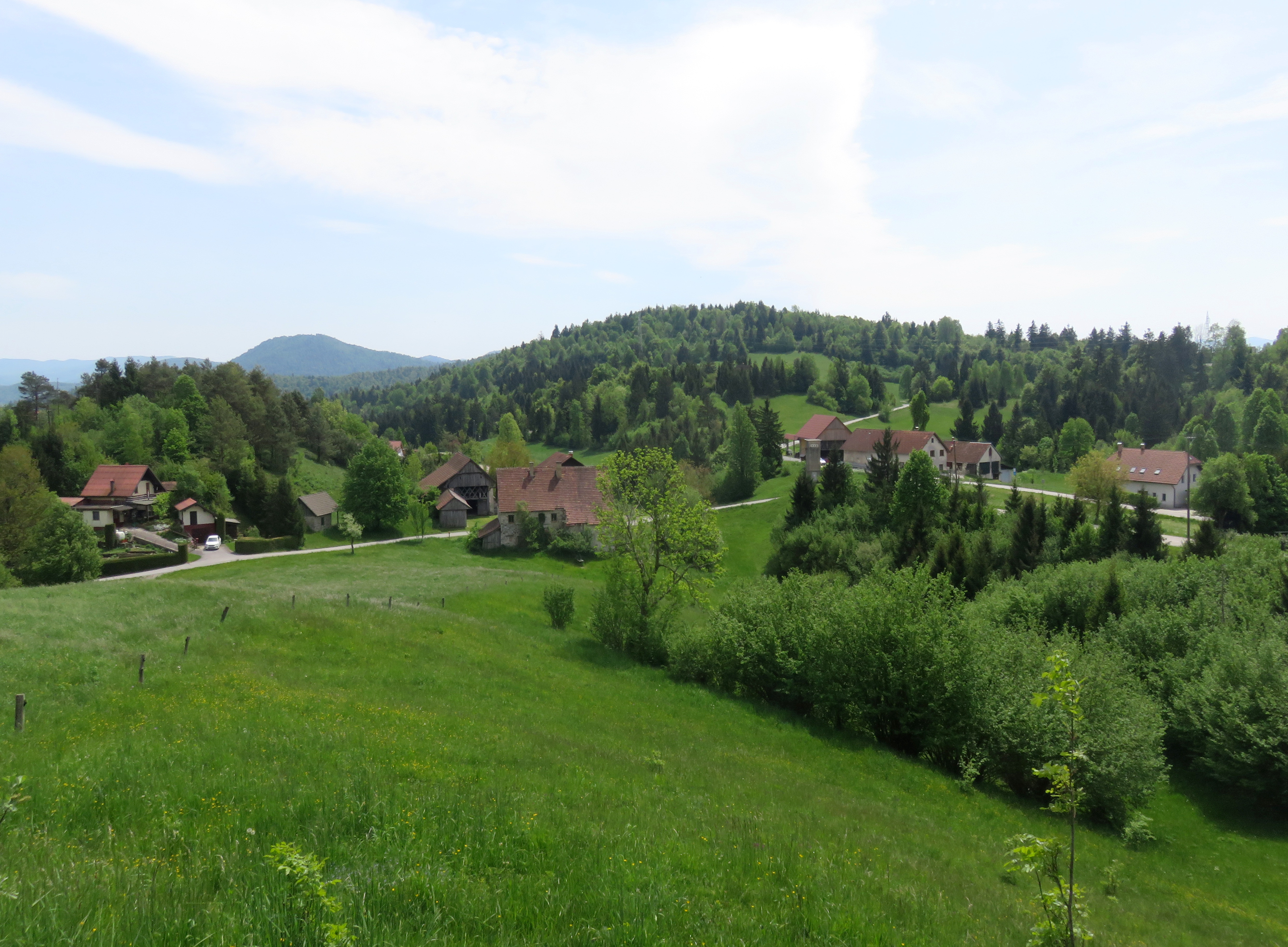

- Location in Slovenia
- Coordinates: 45°57′10.65″N 14°13′44.29″E
- Country: Slovenia
- Traditional region: Inner Carniola
- Statistical region: Central Slovenia
- Municipality: Vrhnika

Area
  - Total: 0.36 km^{2} (0.14 sq mi)
- Elevation: 550.4 m (1,806 ft)

Jerinov Grič (pronounced [jɛˈɾiːnɔu̯ ˈɡɾiːtʃ]) is a small settlement in the hills southwest of Vrhnika in the Inner Carniola region of Slovenia.

== Name ==
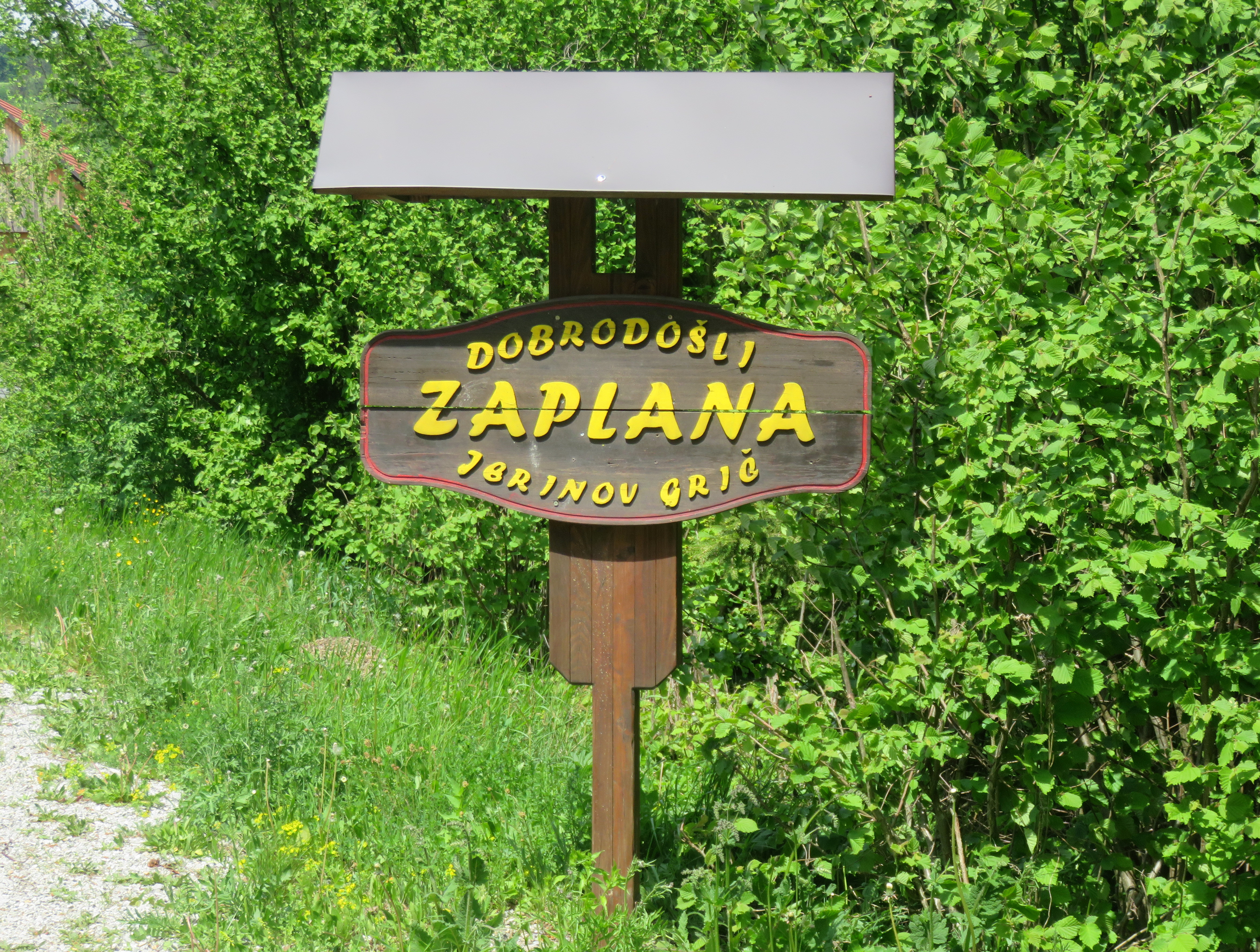
Sign for Jerinov Grič

The name Jerinov Grič literally means 'Jerina's hill'. Jerina is a relatively common surname in Slovenia, and it is most frequently found in central Slovenia.

== History ==
The remnants of a Roman wall are located in Jerinov Grič. The name of the adjacent village of Prezid (literally, 'before the wall') reflects this.

Jerinov Grič was administratively separated from Zaplana in 2002 and made an independent settlement. Further adjustments were made to the boundaries of the settlement in 2016.
