= Mandli =

- Village
- Interactive map of Mandli
- Location within Croatia
- Coordinates: 45.559°N 14.693°E
- Country: Croatia
- County: Primorje-Gorski Kotar County
- City: Čabar

Area
  - Total: 0.4 km^{2} (0.15 sq mi)

Population (2021)
  - Total: 33
  - Density: 82/km^{2} (210/sq mi)
- Time zone: UTC+1 (CET)
  - Summer (DST): UTC+2 (CEST)
- Postal code: 51306 Čabar

Mandli is a village in Croatia, under the town of Čabar, in Primorje-Gorski Kotar County.

== Sports ==
Beginning in 2013, the 7 stage 260 kilometres (160 mi) long Cycling Trail of Gorski Kotar (Croatian: Goranska biciklistička transverzala) passes through Mandli.

== Demographics ==
Village of Mandli: Population trends 1857–2021
v

| population | 100 | 93 | 84 | 82 | 99 | 83 | 92 | 109 | 109 | 99 | 86 | 69 | 48 | 50 | 46 | 39 | 33 |
| | 1857 | 1869 | 1880 | 1890 | 1900 | 1910 | 1921 | 1931 | 1948 | 1953 | 1961 | 1971 | 1981 | 1991 | 2001 | 2011 | 2021 |

Sources: Croatian Bureau of Statistics publications
