= Donji Žagari =

- Village
- Interactive map of Donji Žagari
- Location within Croatia
- Coordinates: 45.566°N 14.693°E
- Country: Croatia
- County: Primorje-Gorski Kotar County
- City: Čabar

Area
  - Total: 1.9 km^{2} (0.73 sq mi)

Population (2021)
  - Total: 11
  - Density: 5.8/km^{2} (15/sq mi)
- Time zone: UTC+1 (CET)
  - Summer (DST): UTC+2 (CEST)
- Postal code: 51306 Čabar

Donji Žagari is a village in Croatia, under the town of Čabar, in Primorje-Gorski Kotar County.

== Sports ==
Beginning in 2013, the 7 stage 260 kilometres (160 mi) long Cycling Trail of Gorski Kotar (Croatian: Goranska biciklistička transverzala) passes below Donji Žagari.

== Demographics ==
Village of Donji Žagari: Population trends 1857–2021
v

population	87	93	64	74	75	76	63	82	63	55	50	47	37	20	14	8	11
	1857	1869	1880	1890	1900	1910	1921	1931	1948	1953	1961	1971	1981	1991	2001	2011	2021

Sources: Croatian Bureau of Statistics publications
