= Tropeti =

Coordinates: 45°35′47″N 14°38′20″E

- Village
- Interactive map of Tropeti
- Country: Croatia
- County: Primorje-Gorski Kotar County
- Town: Čabar

Area
  - Total: 0.9 km^{2} (0.35 sq mi)

Population (2021)
  - Total: 9
  - Density: 10/km^{2} (26/sq mi)
- Time zone: UTC+1 (CET)
  - Summer (DST): UTC+2 (CEST)

Tropeti is a village in Croatia. Administratively, it is part of Primorje-Gorski Kotar County. It is connected by the D305 highway.

== Sports ==
Beginning in 2013, the 7 stage 260 kilometres (160 mi) long Cycling Trail of Gorski Kotar (Croatian: Goranska biciklistička transverzala) passes through Tropeti.
