= Ferbežari =

- Village
- Interactive map of Ferbežari
- Location within Croatia
- Coordinates: 45.569°N 14.621°E
- Country: Croatia
- County: Primorje-Gorski Kotar County
- City: Čabar

Area
  - Total: 0.6 km^{2} (0.23 sq mi)

Population (2021)
  - Total: 30
  - Density: 50/km^{2} (130/sq mi)
- Time zone: UTC+1 (CET)
  - Summer (DST): UTC+2 (CEST)
- Postal code: 51306 Čabar
- Area code: +385 (0)51

Ferbežari or Frbežari is a village in Croatia, under the town of Čabar, in Primorje-Gorski Kotar County.

== Demographics ==
Village of Ferbežari: Population trends 1857–2021
v

population	50	61	45	38	53	54	40	66	62	70	70	60	55	39	28	32	30
	1857	1869	1880	1890	1900	1910	1921	1931	1948	1953	1961	1971	1981	1991	2001	2011	2021

Sources: Croatian Bureau of Statistics publications

== Sports ==
Beginning in 2013, the 7 stage 260 kilometres (160 mi) long Cycling Trail of Gorski Kotar (Croatian: Goranska biciklistička transverzala) passes through Frbežari.
