= Gerovo =

- Village
- Location within Croatia
- Country: Croatia

Area
  - Total: 65.1 km^{2} (25.1 sq mi)

Population (2021)
  - Total: 593
  - Density: 9.11/km^{2} (23.6/sq mi)
- Time zone: UTC+1 (CET)
  - Summer (DST): UTC+2 (CEST)

Gerovo is a Croatian village in Primorje-Gorski Kotar County. It is connected by the D32 highway.

== Geography ==
The NE edge of the karst polje of Gerovo is known as Ponikve because of its dolines.

== History ==
The volunteer fire department DVD Gerovo was founded in 1926, and is today part of the VZ grada Čabra. Its current commander is Robert Pajnić. It was liquidated on 20 January 1939.

The local chapter of the HPS was HPD "Jelenc", which had very low activity for a time until its reconstitution in 1936 under the Josip Turk presidency. In 1937, it had 23 members who participated in expeditions to Risnjak and the source of the Kupa.

Following the Hungarian Revolution of 1956 collapse, SFR Yugoslav communist authorities accepted refugees from the Hungarian People's Republic, settling them to Gerovo, Osijek, Mataruška Banja, and Niška Banja. A total of 1.735 Hungarian refugees were settled in the village.

Gerovo was hit by the 2014 Dinaric ice storm. From 31 January to 2 February 2014, while S and SW geostrophic wind dominated, freezing rain fell on Gorski Kotar, glazing the entire region. It wrecked roofs, power lines an forests, causing power loss for about 14,000 households in Gorski Kotar, or about 80% of its population. It took about 10 days to restore essential infrastructure to the region, and within months electricity was back in most of its former range, but at a cost of about 84.4 million HRK to HEP. At the time it was the largest peacetime damage since its Secession from Yugoslavia, even without counting the forestry losses. The Šumarija Gerovo lost 43% of its wood mass. Clearing blocked forestry roads and forest paths would take years, and thanks to the declining population some were never cleared.

== Demographics ==
In 1870, Gerovo općina, in Delnice podžupanija, had 497 houses, with a population of 3410. Its 41 villages were divided into 3 porezne obćine for taxation purposes. Parishes included Gerovo, Hrib and Plešće.

In 1895, the općina of Gerovo (court at Gerovo), with an area of 126 kilometres (78 mi), belonged to the kotar of Čabar (Čabar court) in the županija of Modruš-Rieka (Ogulin court and financial board). But it was under the electoral district of Delnice. There were 393 houses, with a population of 2166 (the highest in Čabar kotar). Its 23 villages and 11 hamlets were divided for taxation purposes into 2 porezne općine, under the Delnice office.

Town of Gerovo: Population trends 1857–2011
v

population	676	695	563	733	649	835	813	892	681	796	1210	807	840	807	722	689
	1857	1869	1880	1890	1900	1910	1921	1931	1948	1953	1961	1971	1981	1991	2001	2011

Sources:Croatian Bureau of Statistics publications

== Economy ==
There was a sawmill in Gerovo.

== Governance ==
=== National ===
At the 1920 Kingdom of Serbs, Croats and Slovenes Constitutional Assembly election in Modruš-Rijeka County, Gerovo voted mainly for the Croatian People's Peasant Party and to a lesser extent the Democratic Party.

Results at the poll in Gerovo
Year	Voters	Electors	NRS	DSD	KPJ	HPSS	Independent	SS	HSP	HZ
1920	663	293	1	65	9	192	5	3	4	14

== Sports ==
Beginning in 2013, the 7 stage 260 kilometres (160 mi) long Cycling Trail of Gorski Kotar (Croatian: Goranska biciklistička transverzala) passes through Gerovo.

== Infrastructure ==
In 1913, there were two gendarmeries in Čabar kotar: one in Čabar itself and one in Gerovo.

=== Judiciary ===
In 1875, the kotar court of Čabar, subordinate to the royal court at Zagreb, encompassed an 1870 population of 7476, being responsible for the općine: Čabar, Prezid and Gerovo.

== Notable people ==
Notable people that were born or lived in Gerovo include:

- Petar Klepac, legendary figure

== Gallery ==
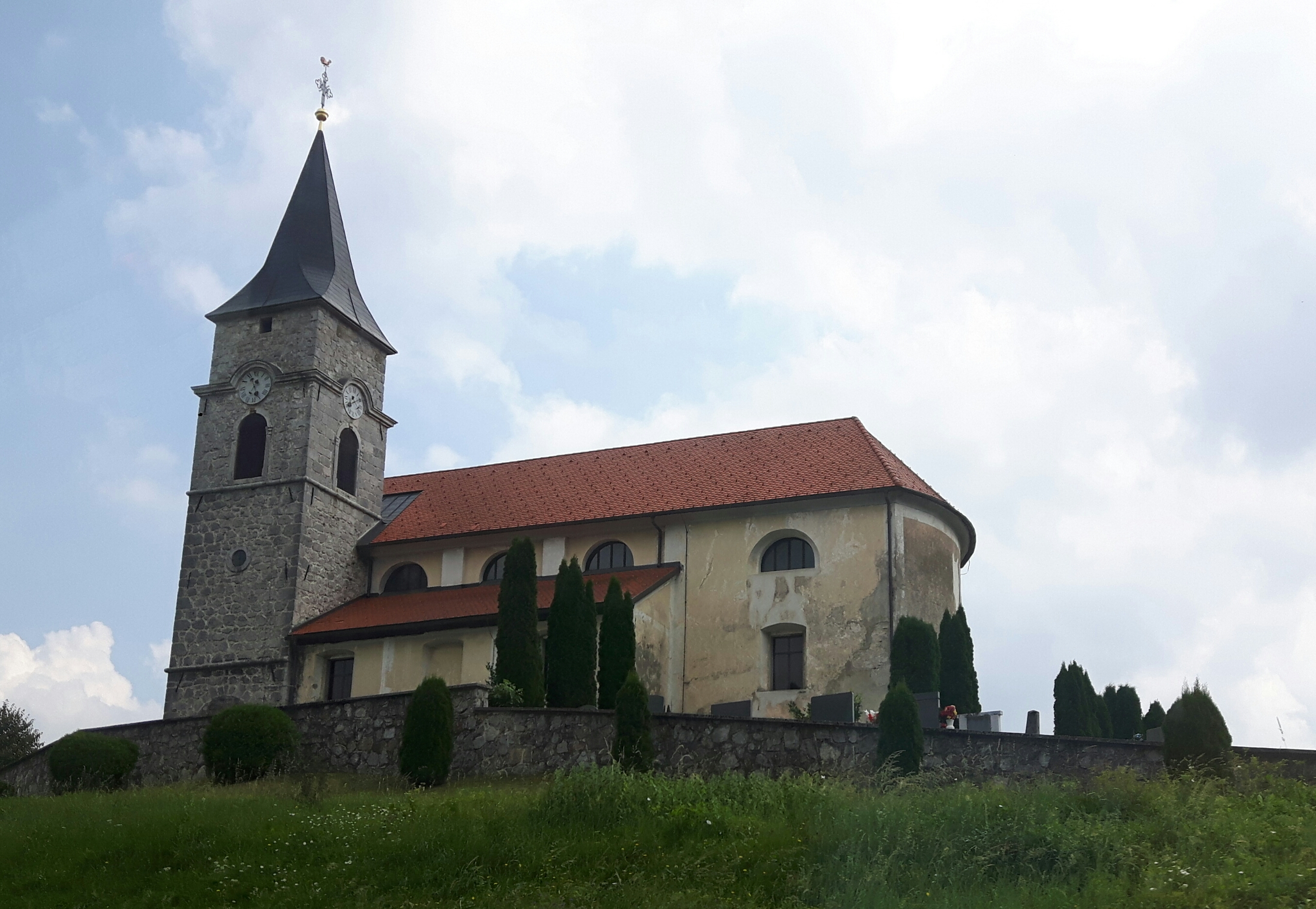
Sv. Hermagora i Fortunata church near Gerovo

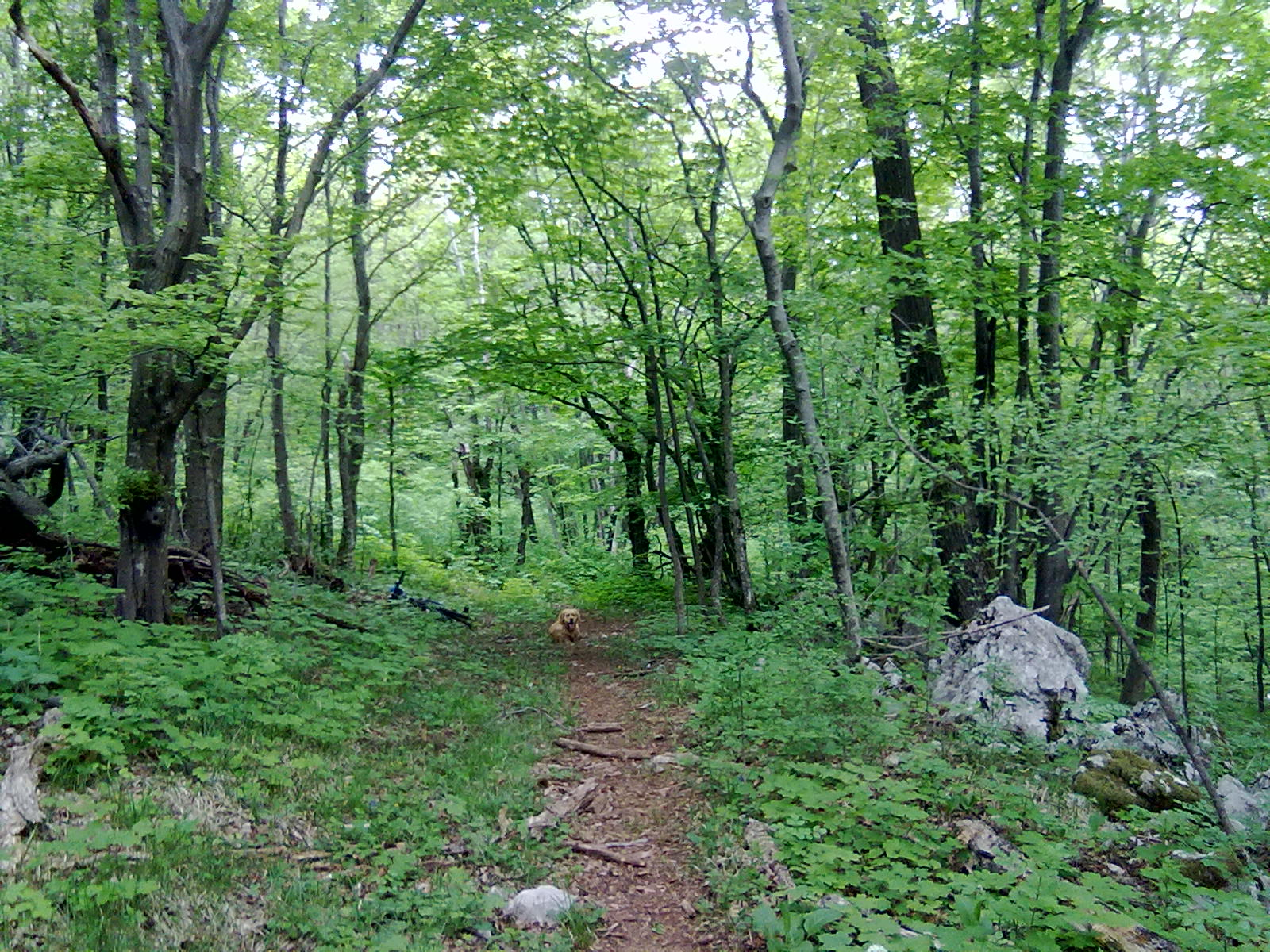
Forest near Gerovo

== History ==
- CKHSGR (1855-03-19) [written 1855-02-16]. "Oglas od strane c. k. hèrv. slav. gruntovnicah ravnateljstva". Carsko kraljevske službene narodne novine (in Serbo-Croatian). Vol. 21, no. 64. p. 190. ISSN 1333-5243.
