= Prhci =

Coordinates: 45°32′49″N 14°38′16″E

- Village
- Interactive map of Prhci
- Country: Croatia
- County: Primorje-Gorski Kotar County
- Town: Čabar

Area
  - Total: 0.5 km^{2} (0.19 sq mi)

Population (2021)
  - Total: 8
  - Density: 16/km^{2} (41/sq mi)
- Time zone: UTC+1 (CET)
  - Summer (DST): UTC+2 (CEST)

Prhci is a village in western Croatia. Administratively, it is part of Primorje-Gorski Kotar County. It is connected by the D32 highway.
