= Brinjeva Draga =

Coordinates: 45°35′26″N 14°37′09″E

- Village
- thumb Flag
- Interactive map of Brinjeva Draga
- Country: Croatia
- County: Primorje-Gorski Kotar County

Area
  - Total: 0.69 sq mi (1.8 km^{2})

Population (2021)
  - Total: 3
  - Density: 4.3/sq mi (1.7/km^{2})
- Time zone: UTC+1 (CET)
  - Summer (DST): UTC+2 (CEST)

Brinjeva Draga is a village in western Croatia (Primorje-Gorski Kotar County). It is connected by the D32 highway.

Croatia
