= Crni Lazi =

- Village
- Interactive map of Crni Lazi
- Location within Croatia
- Coordinates: 45.573°N 14.614°E
- Country: Croatia
- County: Primorje-Gorski Kotar County
- City: Čabar

Area
  - Total: 43.7 km^{2} (16.9 sq mi)

Population (2021)
  - Total: 88
  - Density: 2.0/km^{2} (5.2/sq mi)
- Time zone: UTC+1 (CET)
  - Summer (DST): UTC+2 (CEST)
- Postal code: 51306 Čabar
- Area code: +385 (0)51

Crni Lazi is a village in Croatia, under the town of Čabar, in Primorje-Gorski Kotar County.

== Demographics ==
Village of Crni Lazi: Population trends 1857–2021
v

population	109	104	99	128	142	153	133	172	154	171	171	176	141	132	132	117	88
	1857	1869	1880	1890	1900	1910	1921	1931	1948	1953	1961	1971	1981	1991	2001	2011	2021

Sources: Croatian Bureau of Statistics publications

== Sports ==
Beginning in 2013, the 7 stage 260 kilometres (160 mi) long Cycling Trail of Gorski Kotar (Croatian: Goranska biciklistička transverzala) passes through Crni Lazi.
