= Babno Polje =

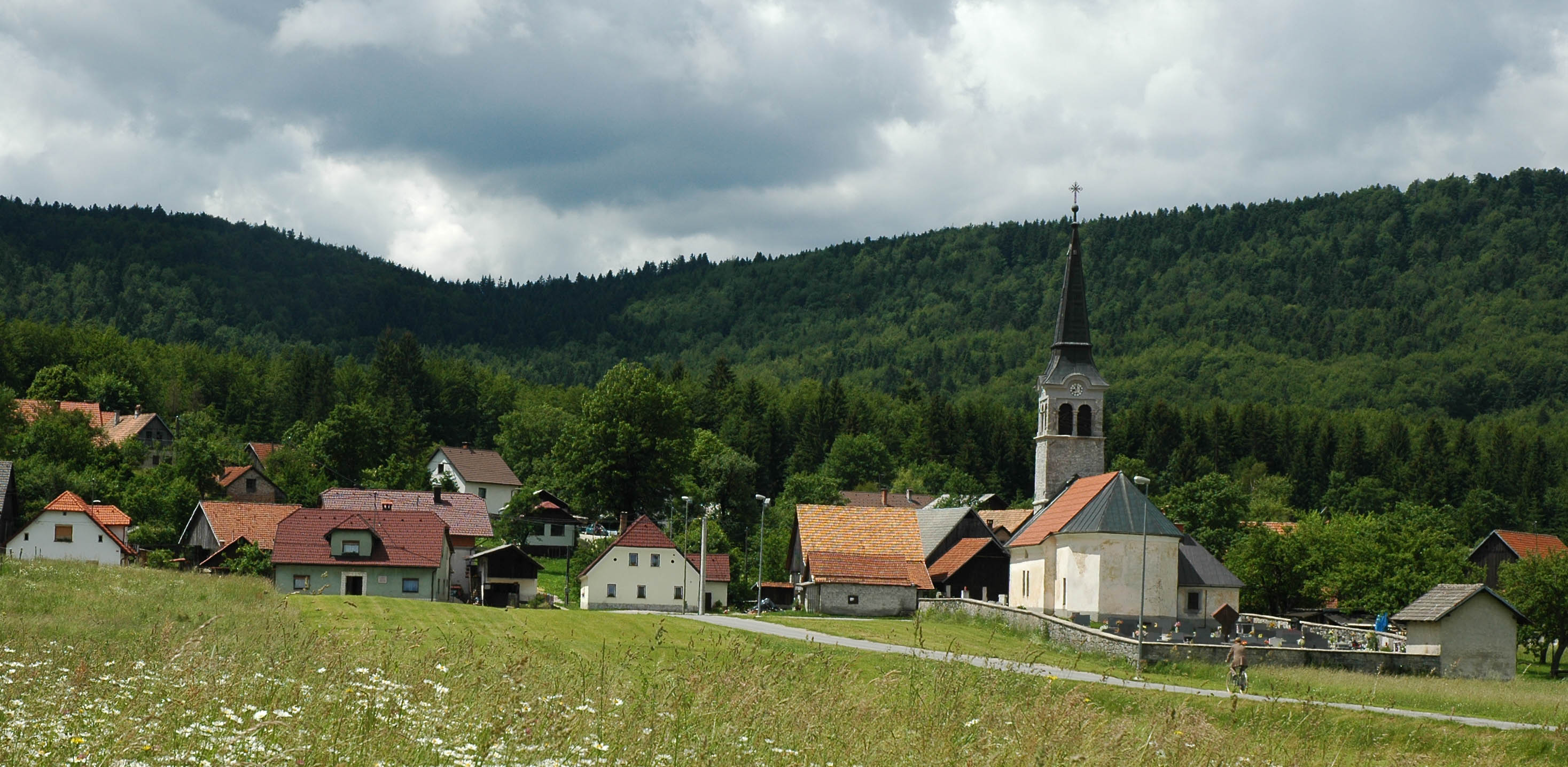
- Babno Polje in summer

- Location in Slovenia
- Coordinates: 45°38′40.19″N 14°32′52.88″E
- Country: Slovenia
- Traditional region: Inner Carniola
- Statistical region: Littoral–Inner Carniola
- Municipality: Loška Dolina

Area
  - Total: 16.4 km^{2} (6.3 sq mi)
- Elevation: 761 m (2,497 ft)

Population (2002)
  - Total: 317

Babno Polje (pronounced [ˈbaːbnɔ ˈpoːljɛ]; in older sources also Babino Polje, German: Babenfeld, Italian: Babinapoglia) is a village in the Municipality of Loška Dolina in the Inner Carniola region of Slovenia, on the border with Croatia.

== Name ==
Babno Polje was attested in historical sources as Pabenfeld in 1402 and Pobenueld in 1449.

== Church ==
The parish church in the settlement is dedicated to Saint Nicholas and belongs to the Ljubljana Archdiocese. It was first mentioned in written documents dating to 1526.

== Climate ==
Statistically, Babno Polje is the coldest inhabited settlement in Slovenia. It holds the record for the lowest officially verified temperature in Slovenia, of −34.5 °C (−30.1 °F), recorded on two separate occasions, 13 Jan 1968 and 15-16 Feb 1956.

Babno Polje has a humid continental climate (Köppen Dfb).

Climate data for Babno Polje, 1991–2020 normals, extremes 1951–2020
Month	Jan	Feb	Mar	Apr	May	Jun	Jul	Aug	Sep	Oct	Nov	Dec	Year
Record high °C (°F)	14.1 (57.4)	17.9 (64.2)	22.8 (73.0)	25.6 (78.1)	30 (86)	34.1 (93.4)	34.6 (94.3)	35.2 (95.4)	30.5 (86.9)	24.4 (75.9)	21.2 (70.2)	15.5 (59.9)	35.2 (95.4)
Mean daily maximum °C (°F)	2.4 (36.3)	4.3 (39.7)	8.6 (47.5)	13.3 (55.9)	17.9 (64.2)	22.1 (71.8)	24.3 (75.7)	24.3 (75.7)	18.6 (65.5)	13.5 (56.3)	7.8 (46.0)	2.8 (37.0)	13.3 (56.0)
Daily mean °C (°F)	−2.4 (27.7)	−1.7 (28.9)	1.8 (35.2)	6.3 (43.3)	11.2 (52.2)	15.3 (59.5)	16.9 (62.4)	16.3 (61.3)	11.3 (52.3)	7.4 (45.3)	3.1 (37.6)	−1.8 (28.8)	7.0 (44.5)
Mean daily minimum °C (°F)	−6.9 (19.6)	−7 (19)	−3.6 (25.5)	0.1 (32.2)	4.4 (39.9)	8.0 (46.4)	9.4 (48.9)	9.4 (48.9)	5.9 (42.6)	2.7 (36.9)	−0.8 (30.6)	−6.1 (21.0)	1.3 (34.3)
Record low °C (°F)	−34.6 (−30.3)	−34.4 (−29.9)	−31.1 (−24.0)	−19.1 (−2.4)	−12.2 (10.0)	−5.6 (21.9)	−1.2 (29.8)	−2 (28)	−7.8 (18.0)	−16.4 (2.5)	−27 (−17)	−29.7 (−21.5)	−34.6 (−30.3)
Average precipitation mm (inches)	101 (4.0)	115 (4.5)	107 (4.2)	115 (4.5)	124 (4.9)	129 (5.1)	106 (4.2)	123 (4.8)	173 (6.8)	200 (7.9)	209 (8.2)	155 (6.1)	1,657 (65.2)
Average snowfall cm (inches)	41 (16)	51 (20)	33 (13)	12 (4.7)	0.1 (0.0)	0 (0)	0 (0)	0 (0)	0 (0)	4 (1.6)	23 (9.1)	47 (19)	211.1 (83.4)
Average extreme snow depth cm (inches)	12 (4.7)	18 (7.1)	10 (3.9)	1 (0.4)	0 (0)	0 (0)	0 (0)	0 (0)	0 (0)	0.2 (0.1)	3 (1.2)	10 (3.9)	18 (7.1)
Average precipitation days (≥ 0.1 mm)	12	12	12	14	15	14	12	11	13	13	15	14	157
Average snowy days (≥ 1 cm)	6	5	4	1	0	0	0	0	0	1	2	5	24
Source: Slovenian Environment Agency (ARSO)
