= Smrečje, Croatia =

Coordinates: 45°32′09″N 14°38′51″E

Smrečje
- Village
- Interactive map of Smrečje
- Country: Croatia
- County: Primorje-Gorski Kotar County
- Čabar: Čabar

Area
  - Total: 4.2 km^{2} (1.6 sq mi)

Population (2011)
  - Total: 64
- Time zone: UTC+1 (CET)
  - Summer (DST): UTC+2 (CEST)

Smrečje is a village in Croatia's Primorje-Gorski Kotar County. It is connected by the D32 highway.

== History ==
On 23 April 2018, a fire burned several buildings down in Smrečje.

== Demographics ==
Village of Smrečje: Population trends 1857–2021
v

| population | 277 | 250 | 184 | 186 | 202 | 180 | 194 | 194 | 170 | 184 | 180 | 161 | 117 | 105 | 83 | 71 | 64 |
| | 1857 | 1869 | 1880 | 1890 | 1900 | 1910 | 1921 | 1931 | 1948 | 1953 | 1961 | 1971 | 1981 | 1991 | 2001 | 2011 | 2021 |

Sources: Croatian Bureau of Statistics publications
