= Prezid, Vrhnika =

Prezid
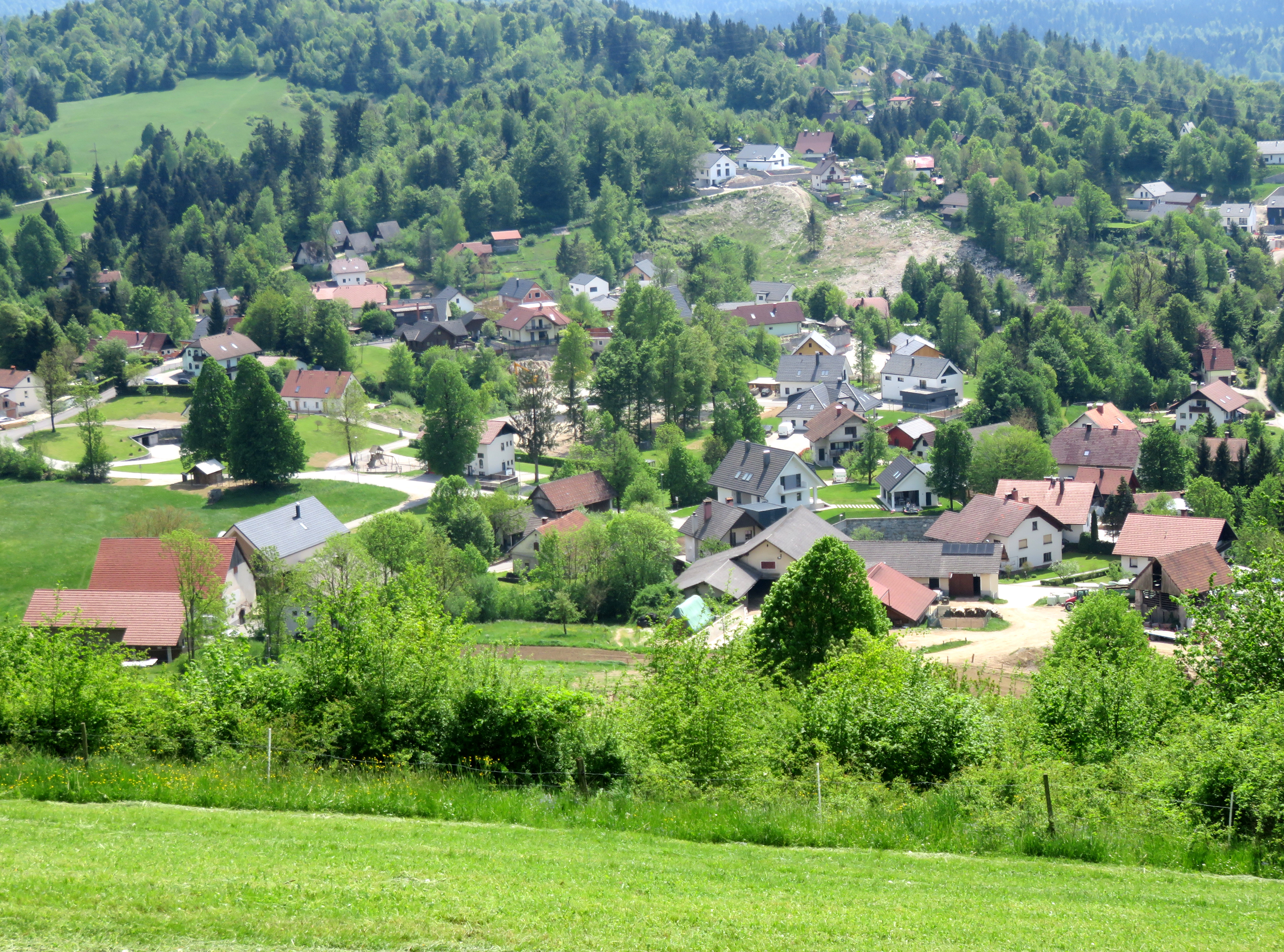

- Location in Slovenia
- Coordinates: 45°57′6.93″N 14°13′21.12″E
- Country: Slovenia
- Traditional region: Inner Carniola
- Statistical region: Central Slovenia
- Municipality: Vrhnika

Area
  - Total: 0.6 km^{2} (0.23 sq mi)
- Elevation: 539.6 m (1,770 ft)

Prezid (pronounced [ˈpɾeːzit]) is a small settlement in the hills north of Logatec in the Inner Carniola region of Slovenia. It belongs to the Municipality of Vrhnika.

== Name ==
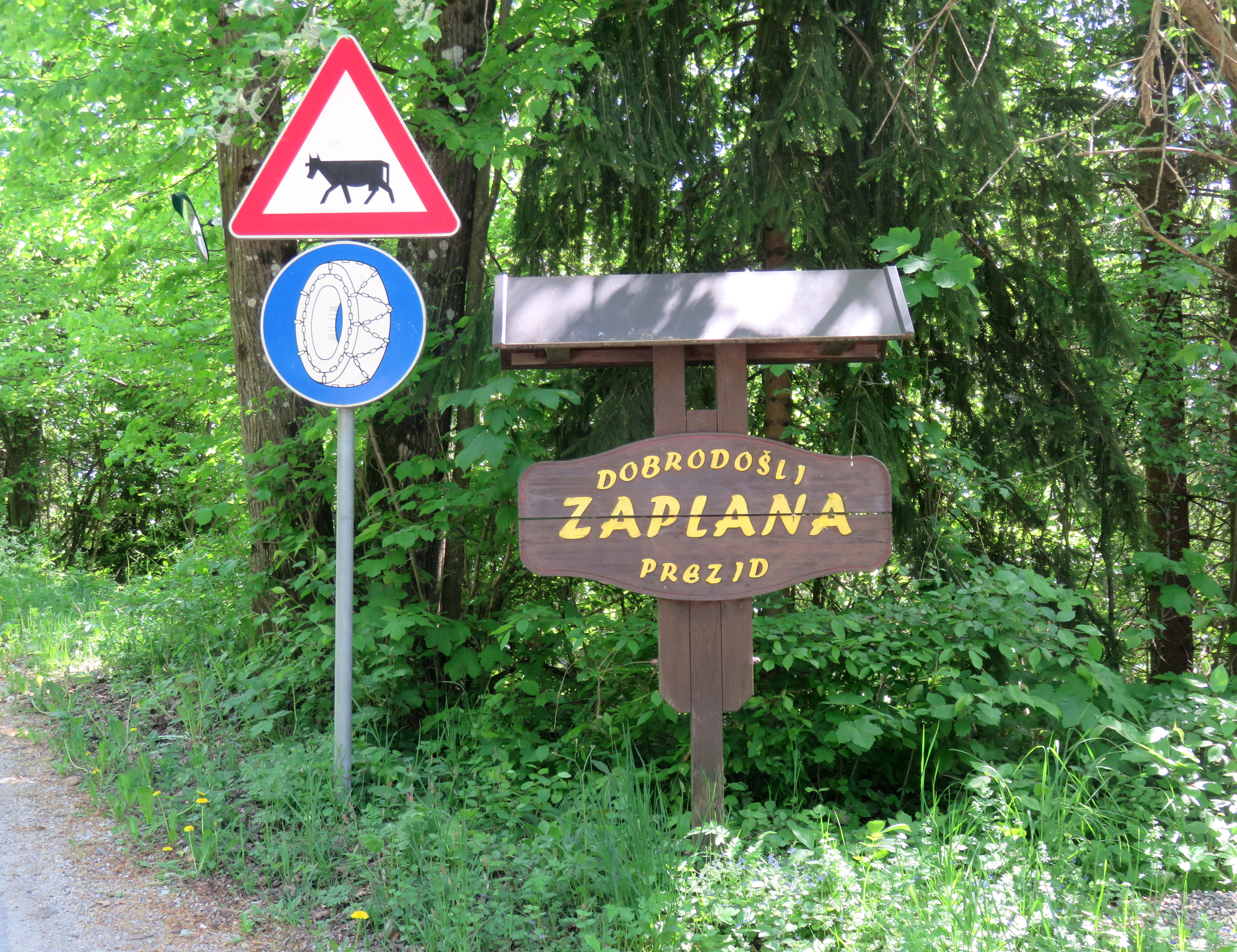
Sign for Prezid

The name Prezid literally means 'before the wall', referring to the remnants of a Roman wall located in the neighboring settlement of Jerinov Grič.

== History ==
Prezid was administratively separated from Zaplana in 2002 and made an independent settlement. Further adjustments were made to the boundaries of the settlement in 2016.

== Gallery ==
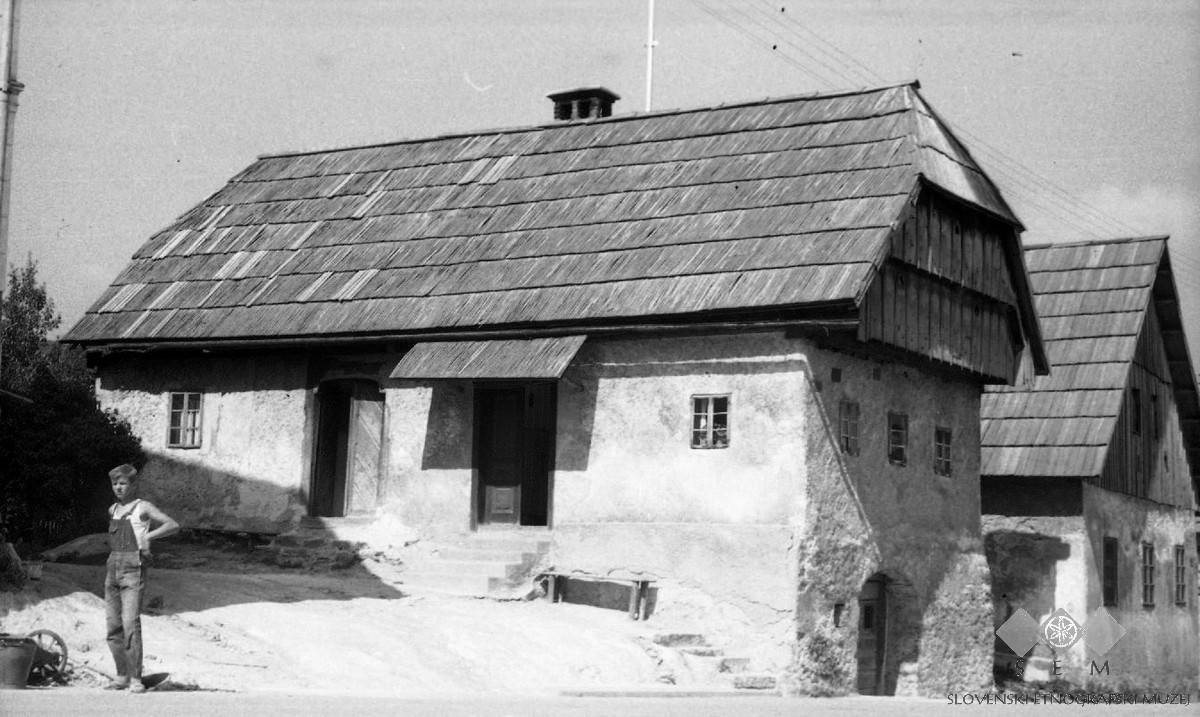
Houses in August 1962

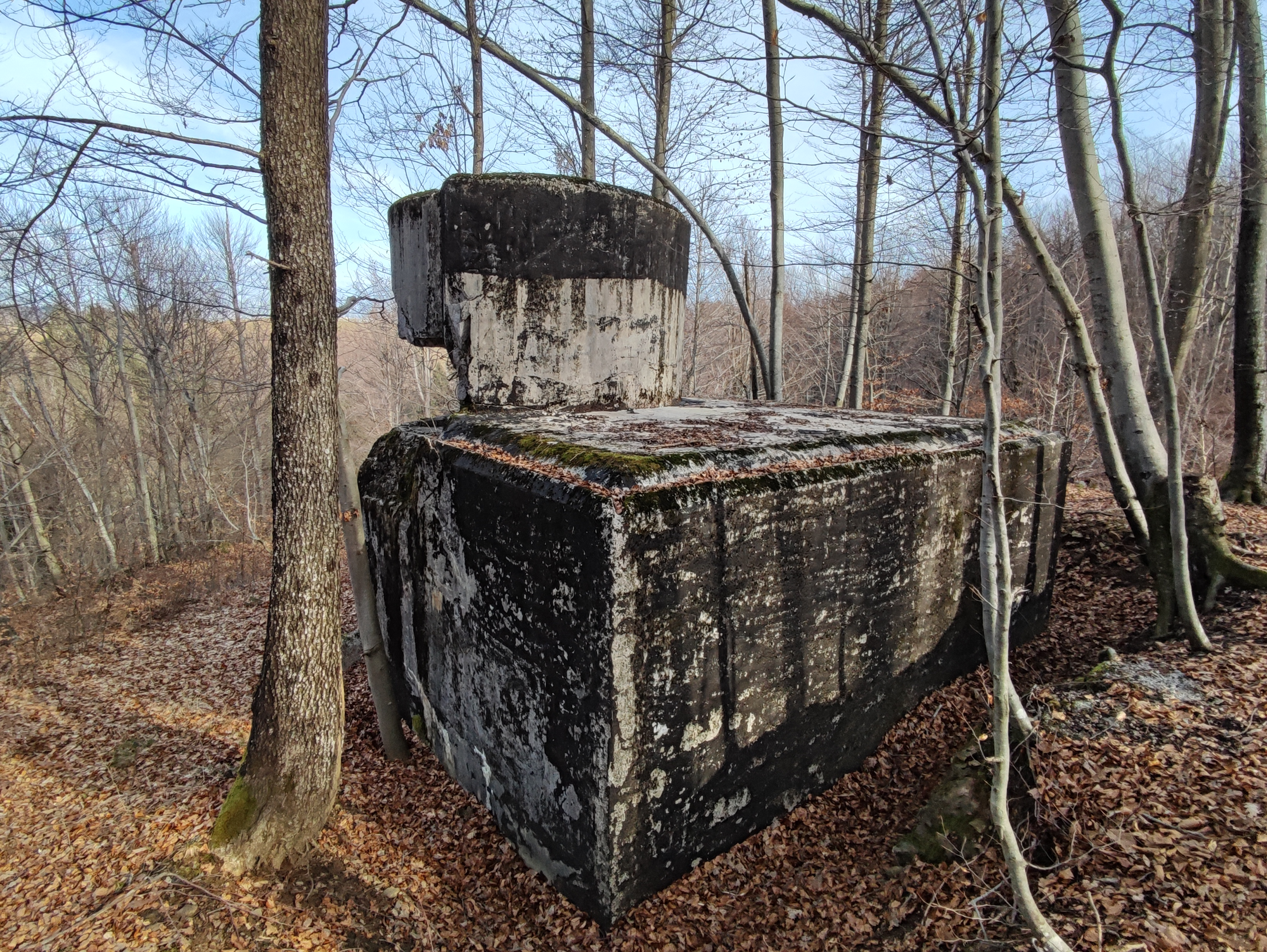
Rupnik Line bunker

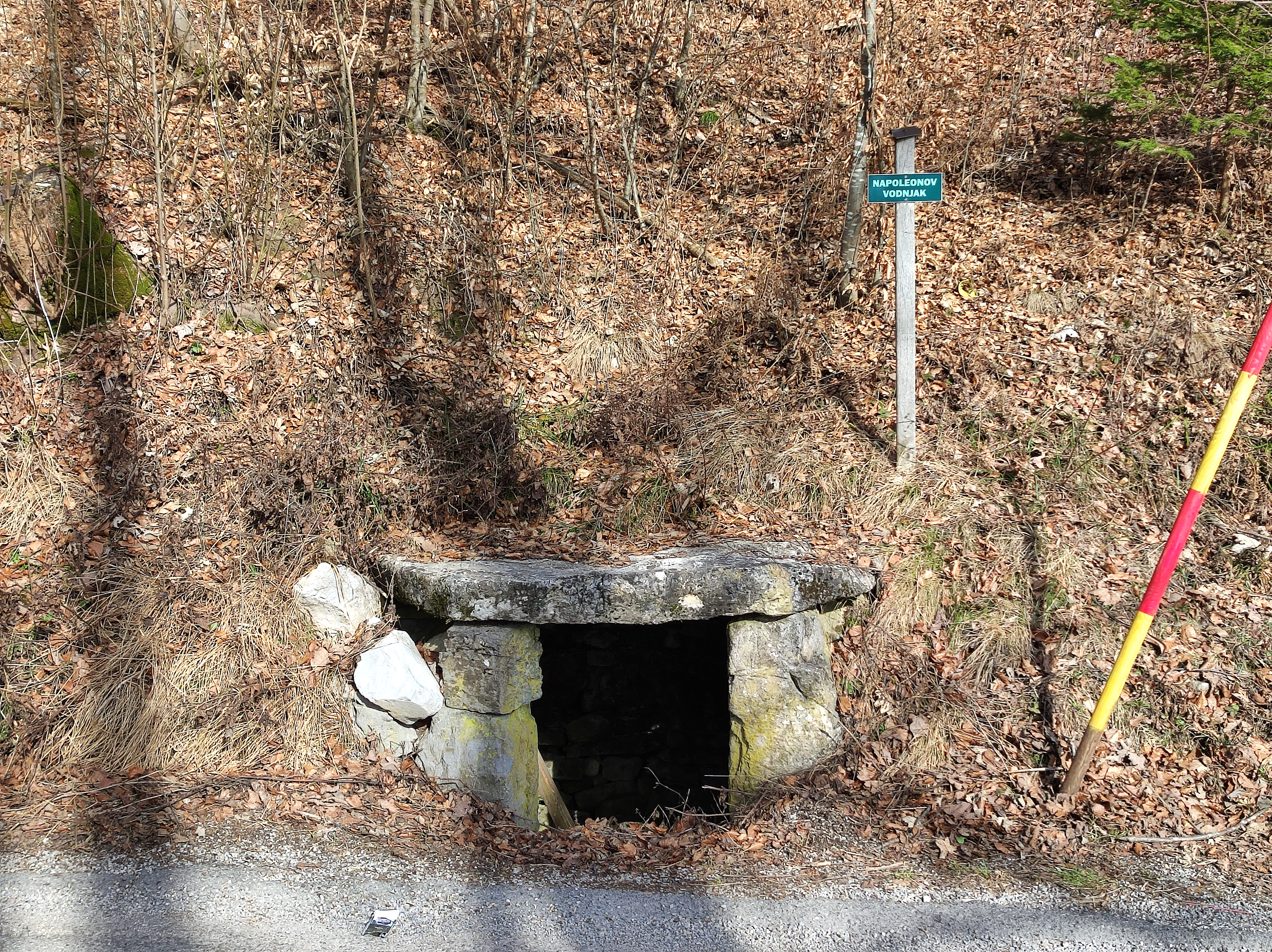
Napoleon's Well (Napoleonov vodnjak)
