= Čabar =

- Town
- Grad Čabar; Town of Čabar
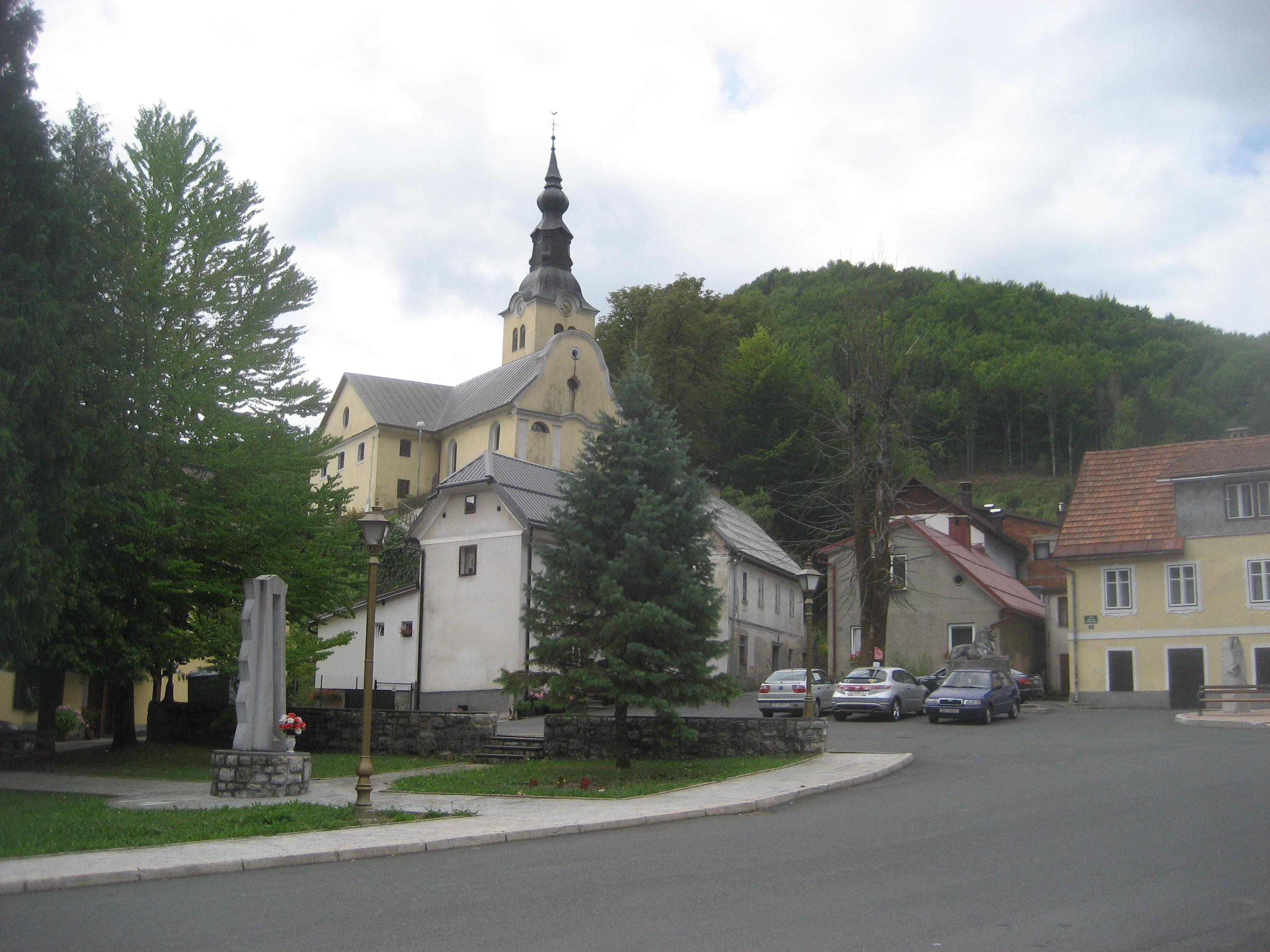
- Čabar town center
- Interactive map of Čabar
- Location of Čabar in Croatia
- Coordinates: 45.596°N 14.647°E
- Country: Croatia
- Region: Mountainous Croatia (Gorski Kotar)
- County: Primorje-Gorski Kotar County

Government
  - Mayor: Antonio Dražović (Independent)

Area
  - Town: 279.9 km^{2} (108.1 sq mi)
  - Urban: 0.6 km^{2} (0.23 sq mi)

Population (2021)
  - Town: 3,226
  - Density: 11.53/km^{2} (29.85/sq mi)
  - Urban: 325
  - Urban density: 540/km^{2} (1,400/sq mi)
- Time zone: UTC+1 (CET)
  - Summer (DST): UTC+2 (CEST)
- Postal code: 51306
- Area code: 051
- Vehicle registration: DE
- Website: cabar.hr

Čabar is a town in Primorje-Gorski Kotar County in western Croatia.

== Name ==
Čabar is known as Čeber in the local dialect. The name is believed to derive from the Illyrian word ziaber 'clearing'.

== History ==
Čabar was first mentioned in 1642 in an urbarium of Petar Zrinski. Due to its vicinity to mining sites in the area, the Zrinski family established a lead smelter, which prompted economic development and immigration of workers, primarily from Carniola.

In the late 19th and early 20th centuries, Čabar was a district capital in the Modruš-Rijeka County of the Kingdom of Croatia-Slavonia.

On 21 February 1852 by a decree of the Ban of Croatia and Slavonia, Josip Jelačić, a Chamber of Commerce and Industry (Croatian: Trgovačko-obrtna komora) was to be founded in Rijeka with jurisdiction over Čabar. It was founded, and began to function on the 11th of March that year.

In late 1899, the local chapter of the HPS, HPD "Rudnik", was founded on the initiative of the Ghyczy de Csubar family. It had to be refounded under president A. Cividini in late 1935. In 1935, the Mirko Župan presidency began on 12 October 1935, succeeding Dr. Muhvić. In 1935, it had 47 members. Under Župan, "Rudnik" opened its own library. Membership rose to 55 in 1937. Membership rose to 56 in 1938.

The volunteer fire department DVD Čabar was founded on 1909 by Fran Vidović, Slavko Brovet, Fran Plivelić, Fran Knafe, Josip Repinc and Vilim Turk. The first firefighter house (Croatian: vatrogasni dom) was opened in 1936, and a new one was opened in 1969. It is the seat of the VZ Čabar, founded in 1969, which oversees the volunteer fire departments of nearby towns.

Past commanders of the VZ Čabar and JVP Grada Čabar: (Note: PVJ Grada Čabar until 1993)

1. Livio Andlar (1994–2005)
2. Slavko Žagar

Past commanders of the DVD Čabar:

1. Ivica Troha

=== WWI ===
In September 1914, the epidemic of an undetermined disease led Austria to prohibit the import of swine from Čabar kotar.

=== Kingdom of Yugoslavia ===
In 1930, an HKD Napredak branch was founded in Čabar. It was responsible for a 1000 dinar high school stipend that school year.

The winter of 1931–1932 was particularly harsh in Čabar and surrounding areas. The lack of livestock feed caused a sharp decrease in livestock price. In the spring, a lack of supplies threatened to collapse the resale and even financial sectors locally. On 30 April 20, the emergency Law on the Protection of Farmers (Serbian: Zakon o zaštiti zemljoradnika) came into force, which prevented forcible sale of farmland until 20 October.

A 22 December 1939 decision as part of agrarian reforms by Ban Šubašić to confiscate the forest property in Čabar and surroundings of the Thurn and Taxis family, Kálmán Ghyczy and Nikola Petrović resulted in a legal dispute known as the Thurn and Taxis Affair, in part because of the relative status of the family and in part because of the proximity to the Italian border.

=== WWII ===
==== 1941 ====
By the end of June 1941, HKD Napredak was no longer allowed to hold plays, celebrations or similar manifestations thanks to a general law. Many of its members were mobilised. The Čabar branch stopped working altogether when Italy annexed it in May.

==== 1945 ====
At the behest of Dušan Rašković, Vladimir Kraljić deacon of the Čabar deaconate and parish priest of Čabar and others gathered in Delnice signed a document recognising the JNOF on 21 February 1945, selecting a delegation to represent the priesthood before their authority.

=== Recent ===
Čabar was hit by the 2014 Dinaric ice storm. From 31 January to 2 February, while S and SW geostrophic wind dominated, freezing rain fell on Gorski Kotar, glazing the entire region. It wrecked roofs, power lines and forests, causing power loss for about 14,000 households in Gorski Kotar, or about 80% of its population. It took about 10 days to restore essential infrastructure to the region, and within months electricity was back in most of its former range, but at a cost of about 84.4 million HRK to HEP. At the time it was the largest peacetime damage since its Secession from Yugoslavia, even without counting the forestry losses. Clearing blocked forestry roads and forest paths would take years, and thanks to the declining population some were never cleared. All three main power lines in Fužine were severed, leaving Čabar without electricity.

== Demographics ==
In 1870, Čabar općina, in Delnice podžupanija, had 324 houses, with a population of 2415. Its 19 villages were divided into 2 porezne obćine for taxation purposes. Parishes included Čabar and Trstje.

In 1890, the općina of Čabar (court at Čabar), with an area of 111 square kilometres (43 mi^{2}), belonged to the kotar of Čabar (Čabar court) in the županija of Modruš-Rieka (Ogulin court and financial board). But it was under the electoral district of Delnice. There were 361 houses, with a population of 2161. Its 19 villages and 2 hamlets were divided for taxation purposes into 2 porezne obćine, under the Delnice office. In the 284 square kilometres (110 mi^{2}) Delnice kotar, there were a total of 1183 houses, with a population of 6848. Its 59 villages and 14 hamlets were divided into 6 porezne obćine. The kotar had no markets. Čabar kotar was divided into 4 općine. Besides itself: Gerovo, Plešce, Prezid.

In 1910, the court of Čabar encompassed an area of 284 square kilometres (110 mi^{2}), with a population of 7,632 (smallest under Ogulin high court). Čabar had its own cadastral jurisdiction, but its business court was in Ogulin.

There are 3226 inhabitants (census 2012), in the following settlements:

- Bazli, population 4 ▼
- Brinjeva Draga, population 3 ▼
- Crni Lazi, population 88 ▼
- Čabar, population 325 ▼
- Donji Žagari, population 11 ▼
- Fažonci, population 0
- Ferbežari, population 30 ▼
- Gerovo, population 593 ▼
- Gerovski Kraj, population 72 ▼
- Gorači, population 92 ▼
- Gornji Žagari, population 65 ▼
- Hrib, population 85 ▼
- Kamenski Hrib, population 4 ▼
- Kozji Vrh, population 59 ▼
- Kraljev Vrh, population 8 ▼
- Kranjci, population 3 ▼
- Lautari, population 18 ▲
- Lazi, population 46 ▼
- Makov Hrib, population 89 ▼
- Mali Lug, population 62 ▼
- Mandli, population 33 ▼
- Okrivje, population 5 ▲
- Parg, population 76 ▼
- Plešce, population 147 ▲
- Podstene, population 13 ▼
- Požarnica, population 0 ▼
- Prezid, population 648 ▼
- Prhci, population 8 ▼
- Prhutova Draga, population 1 ▼
- Pršleti, population 0
- Ravnice, population 27 ▼
- Selo, population 37 ▼
- Smrečje, population 64 ▼
- Smrekari, population 6 ▼
- Sokoli, population 5 ▼
- Srednja Draga, population 40 ▼
- Tropeti, population 9 ▼
- Tršće, population 280 ▼
- Vode, population 32 ▼
- Vrhovci, population 120 ▼
- Zamost, population 18 ▼

In the same census, 94.6% of the population were Croats, 2.3% Slovenes and 1.1% Serbs.

By early 1919, 728 people had emigrated from Čabar Kotar to the United States and 1427 to other countries.

Town of Čabar: Population trends 1857–2021
v

population	7235	7313	5971	6697	6770	7467	6620	7595	6041	6360	6702	6083	5465	5169	4387	3770	3226
	1857	1869	1880	1890	1900	1910	1921	1931	1948	1953	1961	1971	1981	1991	2001	2011	2021

Note:Formed from the Municipality of Čabar. Sources: Croatian Bureau of Statistics publications
Urbanity of Čabar: Population trends 1857–2021
v

population	293	307	319	351	328	326	277	349	298	427	431	572	628	597	511	412	325
	1857	1869	1880	1890	1900	1910	1921	1931	1948	1953	1961	1971	1981	1991	2001	2011	2021

Note:In 1981 the uninhabited portions of Gornji Žagari and Tropeti were transferred to Čabar. Sources: Croatian Bureau of Statistics publications

== Economy ==
There was a mill in Čabar.

== Governance ==
=== National ===
Representatives of the Čabar kotar at the Sabor and Skupština:

- Ljudevit Karoly (1848) (Note: Representative of Gorski, Čabar and Brodski kotar.)
- Đuro Križanić and Tomislav Padavić (1861)
- Adolfo Veber Tkalčević (1865), SNS
- Ivan Vončina (1868) (Note: Čabar-Brod), NS
- Ljudevit Otto (1868), NUS
- Franjo Rački (1871), NS/NLS/NNS
- David Starčević (1881–1887), SP/SP-UO/ČSP
- Ante Starčević (1887–1892), SP

At the 1920 Kingdom of Serbs, Croats and Slovenes Constitutional Assembly election in Modruš-Rijeka County, Čabar voted mainly for the HPSS.

Results at the poll in Čabar
Year	Voters	Electors	NRS	DSD	KPJ	HPSS	Independent	SS	HSP	HZ
1920	768	288	4	25	8	212		4	2	33

=== Municipal ===
Čabar kotar was subordinated to Modruš-Rijeka County until 1922 when the latter was replaced with Primorje-Krajina Oblast, which was unpopular with most Croats and was as a concession replaced in 1929 with the Sava Banovina.

At the time, Čabar was divided into 4 općine: Gerovo, Plešce, Čabar and Prezid.

== Twin towns ==
Čabar is twinned with:

- Pula, Croatia (since 1974)

== Culture ==
=== Cuisine ===
The society Plodovi gorja Gorskog kotara (Note: Official website) organises "Pear days" (Croatian: Dani krušaka) in Čabar.

== Sports ==
Beginning in 2013, the 7 stage 260 kilometres (160 mi) long Cycling Trail of Gorski Kotar (Croatian: Goranska biciklistička transverzala) passes through Vahtari and Čabar.

== Infrastructure ==
=== Security ===
In 1913, there were two gendarmeries in Čabar kotar: one in Čabar itself and one in Gerovo.

=== Education ===
In the school year of 1939–1940, there were 17 schools on the territory of Čabar srez (3 in Čabar, 5 in Draga, 3 in Gerovo, 3 in Osilnica, 1 in Plešce, 2 in Prezid), with 34 teachers, of which 32 Catholic and 2 Orthodox; there were 1518 students, of which 1515 Catholic and 3 Orthodox. 43 students obligated to attend did not, or 2.7% of the obligated population, which by national standards was very low.

=== Judiciary ===
In 1875, the kotar court of Čabar, subordinate to the royal court at Zagreb, encompassed an 1870 population of 7476, being responsible for the općine: Čabar, Prezid and Gerovo.

== Attractions ==
The original Čabar linden (Croatian: Čabarska lipa) dated to the 17th century, but had to be replanted in 1943 and then again on 30 April 2016.

The 196 square metres (2,110 ft^{2}) PP sa spomenikom borcima NOB-a u Čabru was built in 1959.

The 200 square metres (2,200 ft^{2}) PP u središtu Čabra sa spomenikom hrvatskim braniteljima was built in 1999, designed by N. Kvas.

The 100 metres (330 ft) long Kalvarija in Čabar dates to the 18th century, and was protected in 1981.

The 724 square metres (7,790 ft^{2}) school garden was started in the second half of the 20th century and remains unprotected.

== Infrastructure ==
In the 1930s, the daily bus route from Delnice left at 6:00 and arrived at 8.00, passing through Brod na Kupi and Zamost.

== Notable people ==
- Franciska Poje (1837 – 1892), Sisters of Mercy nun
- Edo Šlajmer (1864 – 1935), surgeon
- Dušan Klepac (1917 – 2006), forest scientist

== Gallery ==
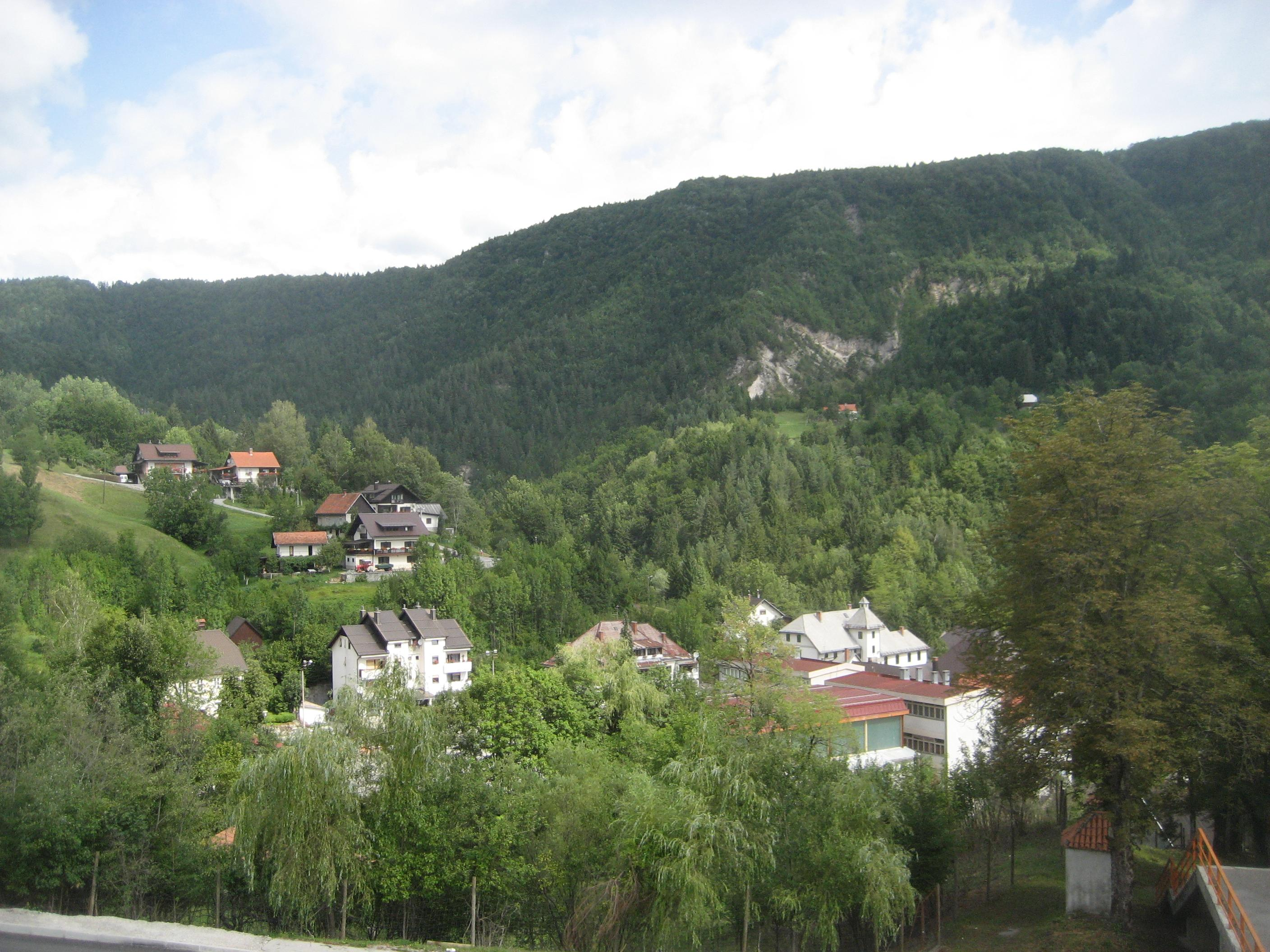
Čabar from above

== Bibliography ==
- OONF PGO (1945-03-19). "Svećenstvo Gorskog Kotara pristupa JNOf-i". Primorski vjesnik: Glasilo jedinstvene Narodno-oslobodilačke fronte Hrvatskog primorja (in Serbo-Croatian). No. 144. p. 4.
