= Parg =

Coordinates: 45°35′42″N 14°37′22″E

- Village
- Interactive map of Parg
- Country: Croatia
- County: Primorje-Gorski Kotar County
- Municipality: Čabar

Area
  - Total: 2.3 km^{2} (0.89 sq mi)

Population (2021)
  - Total: 76
  - Density: 33/km^{2} (86/sq mi)
- Time zone: UTC+1 (CET)
  - Summer (DST): UTC+2 (CEST)

Parg is a village in the western part of Croatia. Located in Primorje-Gorski Kotar County, it is connected by the D32 highway.

== History ==
On 27 December 2023 at 11:56 the ŽVOC Rijeka received a call about a house fire in Parg, Štimci. The fire was caused by a gas explosion that injured the owner and a woman. It was put out at 12:55 by DVD Čabar.

== Climate ==
Parg has a cool and wet humid continental climate (Dfb) due to its geographical position in the Gorski kotar region of Croatia, facing the Adriatic Sea. It's much cooler than either the coast or inland Croatia because of its elevation of 863 m above sea level.

Since records began in 1951, the highest temperature recorded at the local weather station was 35.6 °C (96.1 °F), on 4 August 2017. The coldest temperature was −23.2 °C (−9.8 °F), on 10 February 1956.

Climate data for Parg (1971–2000, extremes 1950–2014)
Month	Jan	Feb	Mar	Apr	May	Jun	Jul	Aug	Sep	Oct	Nov	Dec	Year
Record high °C (°F)	17.8 (64.0)	18.4 (65.1)	22.1 (71.8)	26.0 (78.8)	28.3 (82.9)	31.2 (88.2)	33.5 (92.3)	33.5 (92.3)	29.1 (84.4)	25.9 (78.6)	21.7 (71.1)	17.1 (62.8)	33.5 (92.3)
Mean daily maximum °C (°F)	2.2 (36.0)	3.5 (38.3)	7.2 (45.0)	11.0 (51.8)	16.4 (61.5)	19.5 (67.1)	22.3 (72.1)	22.1 (71.8)	17.8 (64.0)	12.3 (54.1)	6.4 (43.5)	3.4 (38.1)	12.0 (53.6)
Daily mean °C (°F)	−1.3 (29.7)	−0.7 (30.7)	2.3 (36.1)	5.8 (42.4)	11.0 (51.8)	14.0 (57.2)	16.5 (61.7)	16.0 (60.8)	12.3 (54.1)	7.8 (46.0)	2.8 (37.0)	−0.1 (31.8)	7.2 (45.0)
Mean daily minimum °C (°F)	−4.7 (23.5)	−4.3 (24.3)	−1.9 (28.6)	1.4 (34.5)	6.0 (42.8)	8.7 (47.7)	10.8 (51.4)	10.7 (51.3)	7.8 (46.0)	4.1 (39.4)	−0.5 (31.1)	−3.3 (26.1)	2.9 (37.2)
Record low °C (°F)	−21.7 (−7.1)	−23.2 (−9.8)	−18.9 (−2.0)	−10.2 (13.6)	−5.0 (23.0)	−2.2 (28.0)	2.2 (36.0)	0.9 (33.6)	−2.1 (28.2)	−7.0 (19.4)	−13.4 (7.9)	−17.4 (0.7)	−21.7 (−7.1)
Average precipitation mm (inches)	119.5 (4.70)	113.5 (4.47)	129.1 (5.08)	141.1 (5.56)	138.5 (5.45)	158.3 (6.23)	118.9 (4.68)	134.2 (5.28)	180.8 (7.12)	230.9 (9.09)	213.5 (8.41)	162.7 (6.41)	1,840.9 (72.48)
Average precipitation days (≥ 0.1 mm)	13.8	12.9	14.4	15.9	16.3	16.7	12.8	11.9	12.4	14.6	14.2	14.7	170.5
Average snowy days (≥ 1.0 cm)	22.9	20.4	17.9	6.8	0.4	0.0	0.0	0.0	0.1	0.8	9.7	20.7	99.7
Average relative humidity (%)	82.8	79.9	76.8	76.0	76.0	77.1	75.3	77.7	81.9	84.0	84.9	84.3	79.7
Mean monthly sunshine hours	77.5	96.1	127.1	132.0	182.9	180.0	235.6	229.4	168.0	114.7	78.0	71.3	1,692.6
Percentage possible sunshine	31	37	38	36	44	43	55	58	48	37	30	29	42
Source: Croatian Meteorological and Hydrological Service

== Sports ==
Beginning in 2013, the 7 stage 260 kilometres (160 mi) long Cycling Trail of Gorski Kotar (Croatian: Goranska biciklistička transverzala) passes through Parg.
