= Gorači =

Coordinates: 45°36′N 14°37′E

- Village
- Interactive map of Gorači
- Country: Croatia

Area
  - Total: 12.0 km^{2} (4.6 sq mi)

Population (2021)
  - Total: 92
  - Density: 7.7/km^{2} (20/sq mi)
- Time zone: UTC+1 (CET)
  - Summer (DST): UTC+2 (CEST)

Gorači is a village in the western part of Croatia. Administratively, it is part of Primorje-Gorski Kotar County. The village is connected by the D32 highway.
