= Kozji Vrh =

Coordinates: 45°37′N 14°35′E

- Village
- Interactive map of Kozji Vrh
- Country: Croatia
- County: Primorje-Gorski Kotar County

Area
  - Total: 2.0 km^{2} (0.77 sq mi)

Population (2021)
  - Total: 59
  - Density: 30/km^{2} (76/sq mi)
- Time zone: UTC+1 (CET)
  - Summer (DST): UTC+2 (CEST)

Kozji Vrh is a village in Croatia's Primorje-Gorski Kotar County. The village is connected by the D32 highway.
