= Tršće, Croatia =

Tršće
- Village
- Interactive map of Tršće
- Location within Croatia
- Coordinates: 45.565°N 14.63°E
- Country: Croatia
- County: Primorje-Gorski Kotar County
- City: Čabar

Area
  - Total: 1.7 km^{2} (0.66 sq mi)
- Elevation: 824 m (2,703 ft)

Population (2021)
  - Total: 280
  - Density: 160/km^{2} (430/sq mi)
- Time zone: UTC+1 (CET)
  - Summer (DST): UTC+2 (CEST)
- Postal code: 51306 Čabar
- Area code: +385 (0)51

Tršće is a village in Croatia, under the town of Čabar, in Primorje-Gorski Kotar County.

== History ==
The volunteer fire department DVD Tršće was founded on 17 June 1906, and is today part of the VZ grada Čabra. Its current commander is Tomislav Matjašević.

=== WWII ===
At the behest of Dušan Rašković, Jakov Amstodt parish priest of Tršće and others gathered in Delnice signed a document recognising the JNOF on 21 February 1945, selecting a delegation to represent the priesthood before their authority.

=== Recent ===
Tršće was hit by the 2014 Dinaric ice storm. From 31 January to 2 February 2014, while S and SW geostrophic wind dominated, freezing rain fell on Gorski Kotar, glazing the entire region. It wrecked roofs, power lines and forests, causing power loss for about 14,000 households in Gorski Kotar, or about 80% of its population. It took about 10 days to restore essential infrastructure to the region, and within months electricity was back in most of its former range, but at a cost of about 84.4 million HRK to HEP. At the time it was the largest peacetime damage since its Secession from Yugoslavia, even without counting the forestry losses. The Šumarija Tršće lost 34% of its wood mass. Clearing blocked forestry roads and forest paths would take years, and thanks to the declining population some were never cleared.

== Demographics ==
Village of Tršće: Population trends 1857–2021
v

population	211	220	190	213	240	250	245	257	323	331	390	394	415	443	428	342	280
	1857	1869	1880	1890	1900	1910	1921	1931	1948	1953	1961	1971	1981	1991	2001	2011	2021

Sources: Croatian Bureau of Statistics publications

== Sports ==
Beginning in 2013, the 7 stage 260 kilometres (160 mi) long Cycling Trail of Gorski Kotar (Croatian: Goranska biciklistička transverzala) passes through Tršće, where the fourth stage ends and the fifth stage begins.

An annual enduro race takes place at Tršće.

== Bibliography ==
- OONF PGO (1945-03-19). "Svećenstvo Gorskog Kotara pristupa JNOf-i". Primorski vjesnik: Glasilo jedinstvene Narodno-oslobodilačke fronte Hrvatskog primorja (in Serbo-Croatian). No. 144. p. 4.
