= Zamost =

Coordinates: 45°32′N 14°41′E

- Village
- Interactive map of Zamost
- Country: Croatia
- County: Primorje-Gorski Kotar County
- Municipality: Čabar

Area
  - Total: 0.5 km^{2} (0.19 sq mi)

Population (2021)
  - Total: 18
  - Density: 36/km^{2} (93/sq mi)
- Time zone: UTC+1 (CET)
  - Summer (DST): UTC+2 (CEST)

Zamost is a Croatian village in Primorje-Gorski Kotar County.

== Sports ==
Beginning in 2013, the 7 stage 260 kilometres (160 mi) long Cycling Trail of Gorski Kotar (Croatian: Goranska biciklistička transverzala) passes through Zamost.

== Notable people ==
Notable people that were born or lived in Zamost include:

- Anka Žagar, poet
