= Prezid, Croatia =

Coordinates: 45°38′N 14°35′E

Prezid
- Village
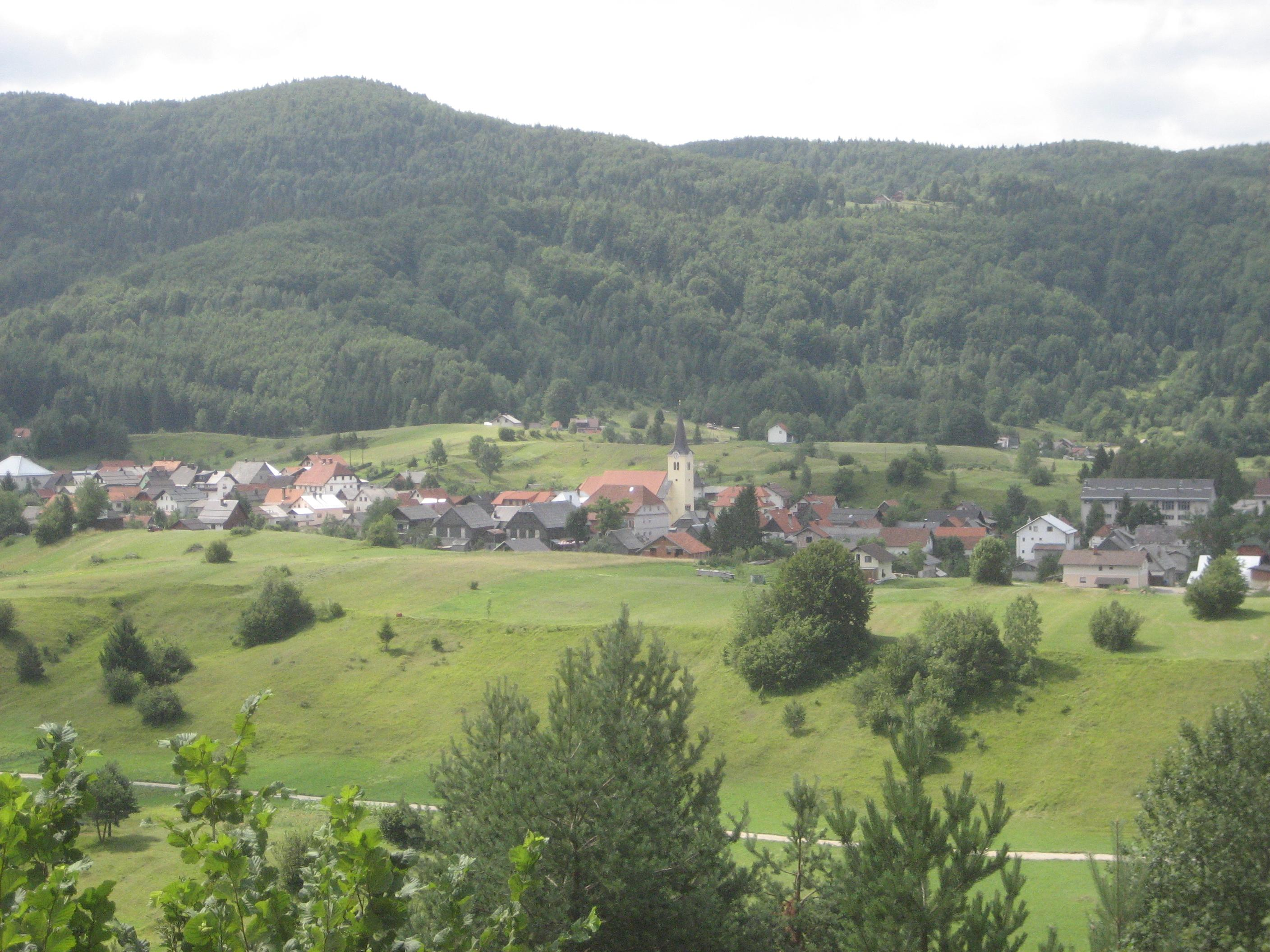
- View of Prezid, Croatia
- Interactive map of Prezid
- Country: Croatia
- County: Primorje-Gorski Kotar County

Area
  - Total: 13.5 km^{2} (5.2 sq mi)

Population (2021)
  - Total: 648
  - Density: 48.0/km^{2} (124/sq mi)
- Time zone: UTC+1 (CET)
  - Summer (DST): UTC+2 (CEST)

Prezid is a Croatian village in Primorje-Gorski Kotar County. It is connected by the D32 highway.

== History ==
The volunteer fire department DVD Prezid was founded on 21 May 1886, and is today part of the VZ grada Čabra. Its current commander is Petar Radošević.

Prezid was hit by the 2014 Dinaric ice storm. From 31 January to 2 February 2014, while S and SW geostrophic wind dominated, freezing rain fell on Gorski Kotar, glazing the entire region. It wrecked roofs, power lines and forests, causing power loss for about 14,000 households in Gorski Kotar, or about 80% of its population. It took about 10 days to restore essential infrastructure to the region, and within months electricity was back in most of its former range, but at a cost of about 84.4 million HRK to HEP. At the time it was the largest peacetime damage since its Secession from Yugoslavia, even without counting the forestry losses. The Šumarija Prezid lost 34% of its wood mass. Clearing blocked forestry roads and forest paths would take years, and thanks to the declining population some were never cleared.

== Demographics ==
In 1870, Prezid općina, in Delnice podžupanija, had 215 houses, with a population of 1651 (lowest in the podžupanija). Its 8 villages were encompassed by a single porezna obćina for taxation purposes. All were in Prezid parish.

In 1895, the općina of Prezid (court at Prezid), with an area of 31 kilometres (19 mi), belonged to the kotar of Čabar (Čabar court) in the županija of Modruš-Rieka (Ogulin court and financial board). But it was under the electoral district of Delnice. There were 250 houses, with a population of 1856. Its 8 villages were encompassed for taxation purposes by a single porezna općina, under the Delnice office.

Town of Prezid: Population trends 1857–2021
v

population	1017	1207	1083	1186	1143	1210	931	1024	977	917	927	963	1000	1021	877	740	648
	1857	1869	1880	1890	1900	1910	1921	1931	1948	1953	1961	1971	1981	1991	2001	2011	2021

Note:Expanded in 2001 with the addition of Zbitke. Sources: Croatian Bureau of Statistics publications

== Dialect ==
Dialect levelling is active, and preservation efforts are sporadic. Beginning in 2022, a dialectal competition and literature festival for children was introduced, Goranski Cukrac, to be held annually throughout Gorski Kotar for the purpose of motivation and practice. It was held again in 2023. In 2024 it was held again, with Prezid winning the competition.

== Economy ==
There was a sawmill in Prezid, and another on Milanov Vrh.

== Governance ==
=== National ===
At the 1920 Kingdom of Serbs, Croats and Slovenes Constitutional Assembly election in Modruš-Rijeka County, Prezid voted mainly for the Communist Party of Yugoslavia and to a lesser extent the Democratic Party and Croatian People's Peasant Party.

Results at the poll in Prezid
Year	Voters	Electors	NRS	DSD	KPJ	HPSS	Independent	SS	HSP	HZ
1920	461	160	1	32	50	30	5	8	9	25

== Infrastructure ==
=== Judiciary ===
In 1875, the kotar court of Čabar, subordinate to the royal court at Zagreb, encompassed an 1870 population of 7476, being responsible for the općine: Čabar, Prezid and Gerovo.

== Gallery ==
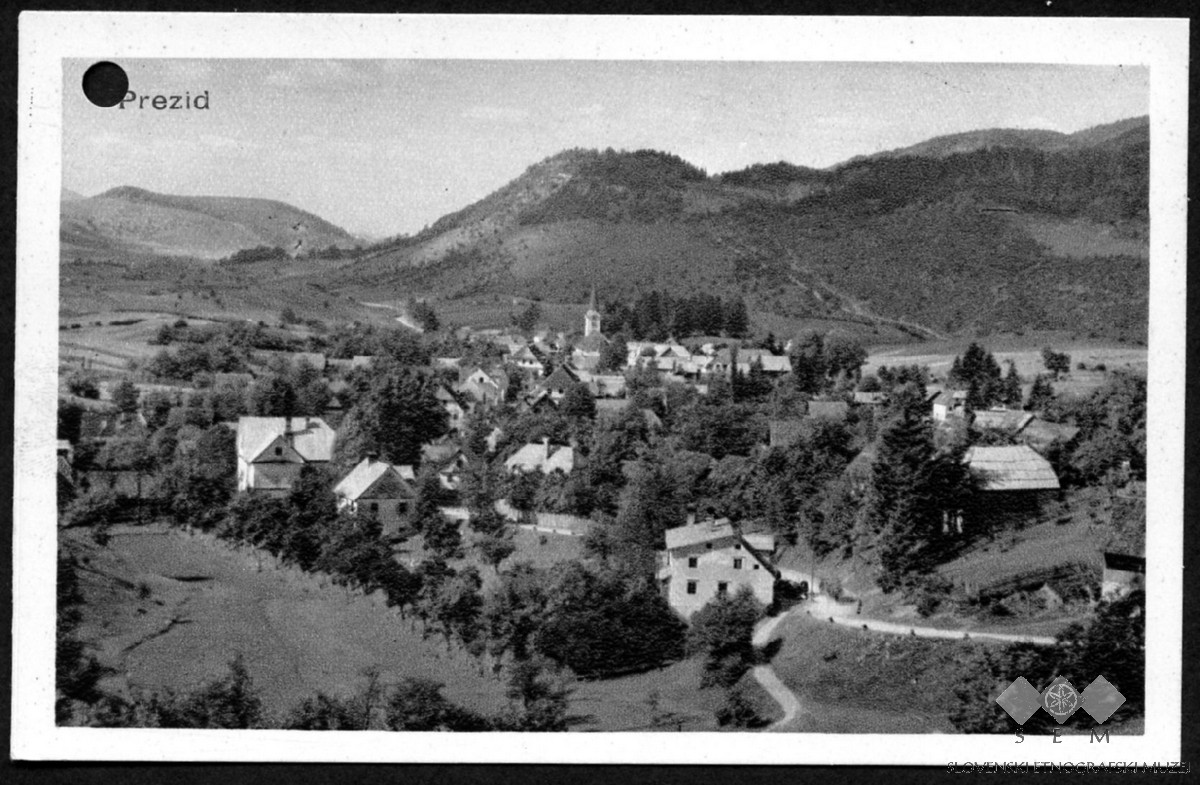
Postcard from 1928-1947.

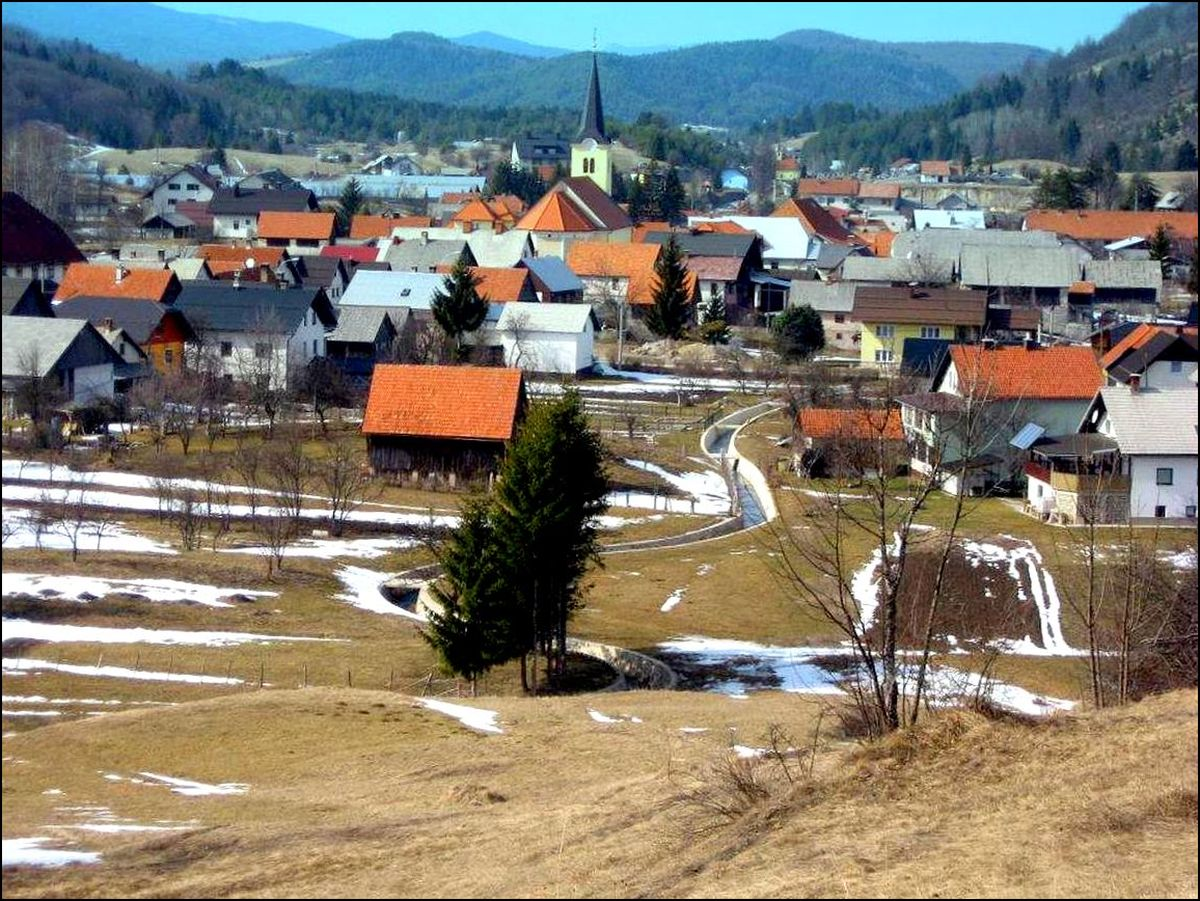
Winter of 2012.
