= Plešce =

- Village
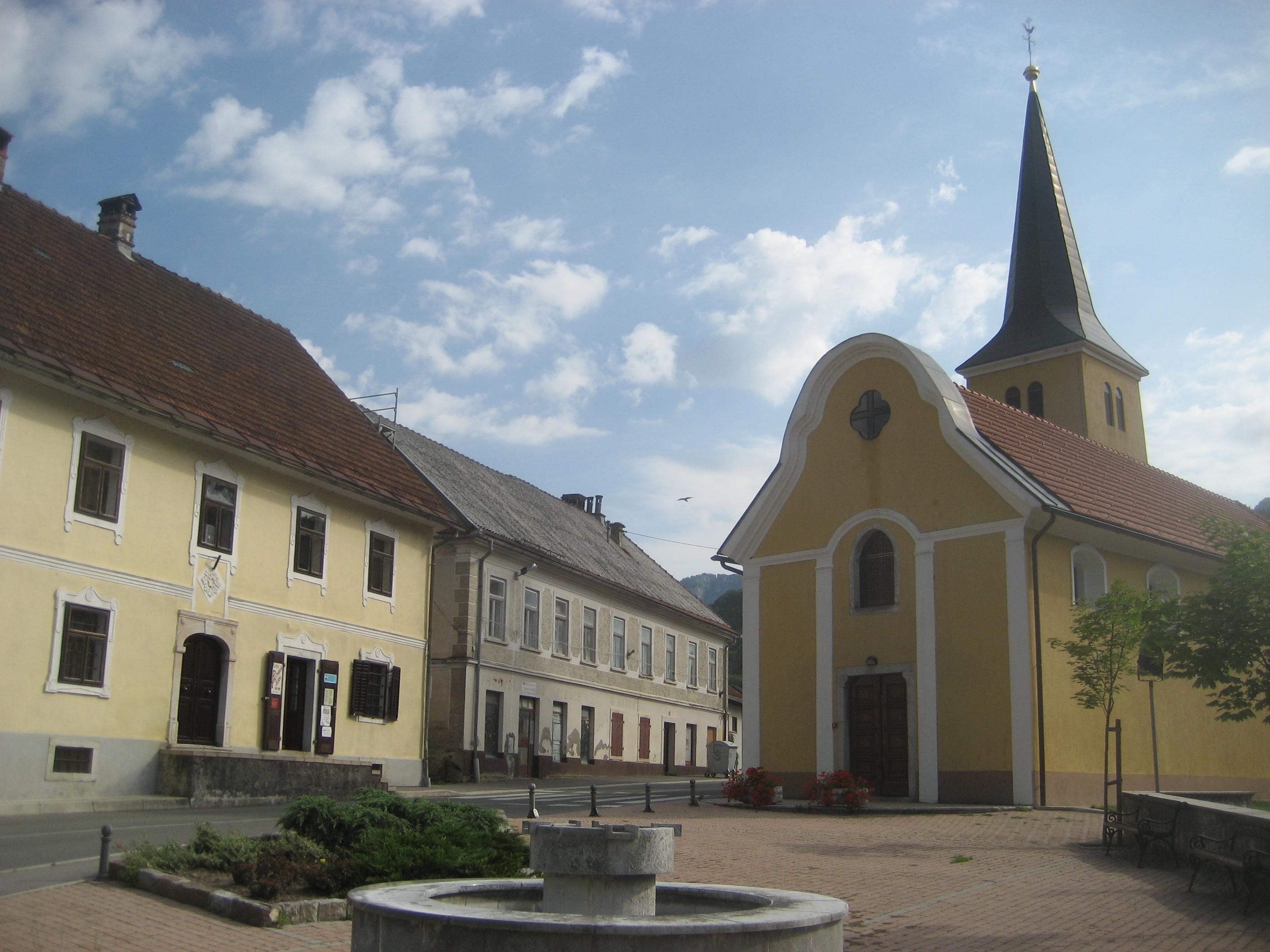
- Plešce

- Location within Croatia
- Coordinates: 45°32′43″N 14°41′6″E
- Country: Croatia
- County: Primorje-Gorski Kotar County
- Municipality: Čabar

Area
  - Total: 0.5 km^{2} (0.19 sq mi)

Population (2021)
  - Total: 147
  - Density: 290/km^{2} (760/sq mi)
- Time zone: UTC+1 (CET)
  - Summer (DST): UTC+2 (CEST)

Plešce is a village in Gorski Kotar region in western Croatia.

== History ==
The volunteer fire department DVD Plešce was founded in 1850, and is today part of the VZ grada Čabra. Its current commander is Venceslav Štimec.

== Demographics ==
In 1895, the općina of Plešce (court at Plešce), with an area of 15 kilometres (9.3 mi), belonged to the kotar of Čabar (Čabar court) in the županija of Modruš-Rieka (Ogulin court and financial board). But it was under the electoral district of Delnice. There were 179 houses, with a population of 935 (the smallest in the županija). Its 9 villages and 1 hamlet were encompassed for taxation purposes by a single porezna općina, under the Delnice office.

Town of Plešce: Population trends 1857–2021
v

population	154	142	161	170	172	183	144	165	158	175	176	164	136	178	159	140	147
	1857	1869	1880	1890	1900	1910	1921	1931	1948	1953	1961	1971	1981	1991	2001	2011	2021

Sources: Croatian Bureau of Statistics publications

== Governance ==
=== National ===
At the 1920 Kingdom of Serbs, Croats and Slovenes Constitutional Assembly election in Modruš-Rijeka County, Plešce voted mainly for the HPSS.

Results at the poll in Plešce
Year	Voters	Electors	NRS	DSD	KPJ	HPSS	Independent	SS	HSP	HZ
1920	295	80		2		62	1	2	1	12

== Sports ==
Beginning in 2013, the 7 stage 260 kilometres (160 mi) long Cycling Trail of Gorski Kotar (Croatian: Goranska biciklistička transverzala) passes through Plešce.

== Attractions ==
The 211 square metres (2,270 ft^{2}) PP park was built in the 1990s, designed by N. Kvas.

== Notable people ==
Notable people that were born or lived in Plešce include:

- Petar Klepac, legendary figure
