= Smash Mouth discography =

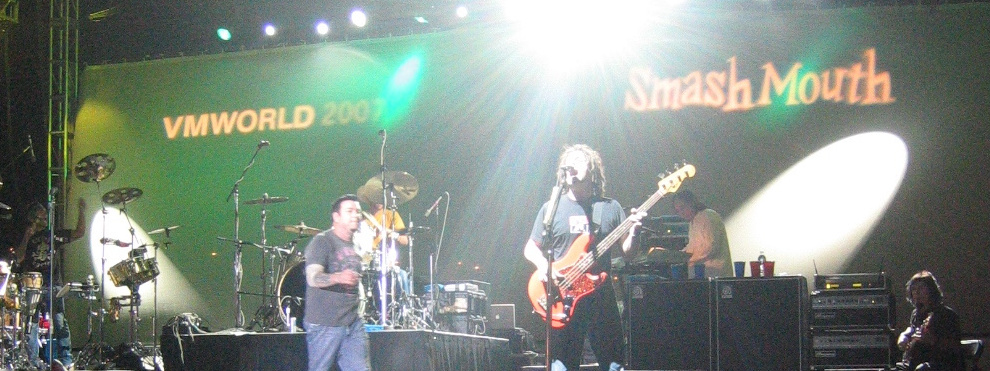
- Smash Mouth at VMworld 2007
- Studio albums: 9
- Compilation albums: 4
- Singles: 19
- Music videos: 13

The discography of Smash Mouth, an American rock band, consists of nine studio albums, four compilation albums, 19 singles and 13 music videos. Their first studio album, Fush Yu Mang, was released in 1997. It peaked at number 19 in the US and was certified platinum two times by the RIAA. A single from the album, "Walkin' on the Sun", peaked at number 1 on the US Adult Top 40 and Alternative Songs charts and at number 3 in Canada. In 1999, Smash Mouth released their second studio album, Astro Lounge. Helped by the singles "Can't Get Enough of You Baby", "All Star", and "Then the Morning Comes", the album peaked at number 6 in the US and was certified platinum three times by the RIAA. "All Star" peaked at number 1 on the US Adult Top 40 chart and also reached the top five on the US Billboard Hot 100, US Alternative Songs, Australia, and Canada charts. "Then the Morning Comes" peaked at number 2 on the US Adult Top 40 and Canada charts.

The band released their self-titled third studio album in 2001. It peaked at number 48 in the US and was certified gold by the RIAA; to date, it is their third and last album to be certified by the RIAA. The single "I'm a Believer" is the last Smash Mouth song to reach the top five of a chart, peaking at number 4 on the US Adult Top 40. Both "All Star" and "I'm a Believer" were featured on the soundtrack for the 2001 film Shrek. Smash Mouth's next studio album, Get the Picture?, was released in 2003. It is their last studio album to chart in the US. In 2005, they released the compilation album All Star Smash Hits and the studio album The Gift of Rock. All Star Smash Hits is their only compilation album to chart in the US. The following year, the band released the studio album Summer Girl, followed by Magic in 2012. In 2023, they released their first studio album in 11 years, Missile Toes, which is their first album with singer Zach Goode. The band released their twelfth studio album, Mercury Comet, in 2026.

== Albums ==
=== Studio albums ===
List of studio albums, with selected chart positions, sales figures and certifications
Title	Album details	Peak chart positions							Sales	Certifications
Title	Album details	US	AUS	CAN	GER	NLD	NZ	UK	Sales	Certifications
Fush Yu Mang	Released: July 8, 1997; Label: Interscope; Formats: CD, cassette, digital download	19	—	23	—	—	42	117		RIAA: 2× Platinum; MC: Platinum
Astro Lounge	Released: June 8, 1999; Label: Interscope; Formats: CD, cassette, digital download	6	29	12	69	85	19	150	US: 3,200,000	RIAA: 3× Platinum; ARIA: Gold; MC: Platinum
Smash Mouth	Released: November 27, 2001; Label: Interscope; Formats: CD, cassette, digital download	48	70	87	—	—	46	—		RIAA: Gold
Get the Picture?	Released: August 5, 2003; Labels: Interscope; Formats: CD, digital download	100	—	—	—	—	—	—	US: 33,143	
The Gift of Rock	Released: December 1, 2005; Label: Beautiful Bomb; Formats: CD, digital download	—	—	—	—	—	—	—		
Summer Girl	Released: September 19, 2006; Label: Beautiful Bomb; Formats: CD, digital download	—	—	—	—	—	—	—		
Magic	Released: September 4, 2012; Label: 429; Formats: CD, digital download	—	—	—	—	—	—	—		
Missile Toes	Released: November 17, 2023; Formats: Digital download, streaming	—	—	—	—	—	—	—		
Mercury Comet	Released: August 12, 2026; Formats: Digital download, streaming	—	—	—	—	—	—	—		
"—" denotes a recording that did not chart or was not released in that territory.

=== Compilation albums ===
List of compilation albums, with selected chart positions
Title	Album details	Peak chart positions
Title	Album details	US
The East Bay Sessions	Released: November 8, 1999; Label: Red Clay; Formats: CD	—
All Star Smash Hits	Released: August 23, 2005; Label: Interscope, UM^{e}; Formats: CD	96
Icon	Released: September 9, 2014; Label: Interscope, UM^{e}; Formats: CD	—
Playlist: The Very Best of Smash Mouth	Released: May 27, 2016; Label: Sony Music; Formats: CD	—
"—" denotes a recording that did not chart or was not released in that territory.

== Singles ==
List of singles, with selected chart positions and certifications, showing year released and album name
Title	Year	Peak chart positions										Certifications	Album
Title	Year	US	US Adult	US Alt.	AUS	CAN	GER	NLD	NZ	SWE	UK	Certifications	Album
"Walkin' on the Sun"	1997	—^{[A]}	1	1	7	3	90	76	27	42	19	ARIA: Platinum; BPI: Silver; RMNZ: Gold	Fush Yu Mang
"Why Can't We Be Friends?"	1997	—	—	28	67	—	—	89	39	29	—		Fush Yu Mang
"The Fonz"	1998	—	—	—	—	—	—	—	—	—	82		Fush Yu Mang
"Can't Get Enough of You Baby"	1998	—^{[B]}	14	30	14	8	—	—	—	—	—	ARIA: Gold	Astro Lounge
"All Star"	1999	4	1	2	4	2	74	57	15	49	24	RIAA: 3× Platinum; ARIA: Platinum; BPI: 2× Platinum; BVMI: Gold; RMNZ: 5× Platinum	Astro Lounge
"Then the Morning Comes"	1999	11	2	26	—	2	—	—	22	—	—		Astro Lounge
"Waste"	2000	—	39	—	—	—	—	—	—	—	—		Astro Lounge
"I'm a Believer"	2001	25	4	—	9	—	94	87	12	—	—	ARIA: Platinum; BPI: Gold; RMNZ: Platinum	Shrek: Music from the Original Motion Picture and Smash Mouth
"Pacific Coast Party"	2001	—^{[C]}	23	—	53	—	—	—	25	—	—		Smash Mouth
"Holiday in My Head"	2002	—	—	—	—	—	—	—	—	—	—		Smash Mouth
"You Are My Number One"	2003	—	25	—	—	—	—	—	—	—	—		Get the Picture?
"Hang On"	2003	—	—	—	—	—	—	—	—	—	—		Get the Picture?
"Always Gets Her Way"	2004	—	—	—	—	—	—	—	—	—	—		Get the Picture?
"Getaway Car"	2005	—	—	—	—	—	—	—	—	—	—		Summer Girl
"Story of My Life"	2006	—	29	—	—	—	—	—	—	—	—		Summer Girl
"So Insane"	2006	—	25	—	—	—	—	—	—	—	—		Summer Girl
"Magic" (featuring J. Dash)	2012	—	—	—	—	—	—	—	—	—	—		Magic
"Mama Don't You Worry"	2013	—	—	—	—	—	—	—	—	—	—		Non-album singles
"Unity" (feat. DMC and Kool Keith)	2018	—	—	—	—	—	—	—	—	—	—		Non-album singles
"Bus Stop"	2019	—	—	—	—	—	—	—	—	—	—		Non-album singles
"Camelot" (with Timmy Trumpet)	2021	—	—	—	—	—	—	—	—	—	—		Non-album singles
"Never Gonna Give You Up"	2022	—	—	—	—	—	—	—	—	—	—		Non-album singles
"4th of July"	2022	—	—	—	—	—	—	—	—	—	—		Non-album singles
"Underground Sun"	2023	—	—	—	—	—	—	—	—	—	—		Non-album singles
"Ride On"	2024	—	—	—	—	—	—	—	—	—	—		Non-album singles
"Sunshine Day"	2024	—	—	—	—	—	—	—	—	—	—		Non-album singles
"Love Me Do"	2024	—	—	—	—	—	—	—	—	—	—		Punk Rock Valentines
"Blinding Lights"	2025	—	—	—	—	—	—	—	—	—	—		Punk Rock Valentines
"Better Believer"	2026	—	—	—	—	—	—	—	—	—	—		Mercury Comet
"Had Enuff"	2026	—	—	—	—	—	—	—	—	—	—		Mercury Comet
"Monsters on My Block"	2026	—	—	—	—	—	—	—	—	—	—		Mercury Comet
"—" denotes a recording that did not chart or was not released in that territory.

== Music videos ==
List of music videos, with directors, showing year released
Title	Year	Director(s)
"Walkin' on the Sun"	1997	McG
"Why Can't We Be Friends?"	1997	McG
"Can't Get Enough of You, Baby"	1998	McG
"All Star"	1999	McG
"Then the Morning Comes"	1999	Scott Marshall, Ramsey Nickell
"Waste"	2000	Chris Hafner
"I'm a Believer"	2001	Scott Marshall
"Pacific Coast Party"	2001	Tryan George
"Your Man"	2001	—N/a
"Holiday in My Head"	2002	Mark Gerard
"You Are My Number One"	2003	Michael John Sarna
"Hang On"	2003	Nick Quested
"Story of My Life"	2006	Nick Harwell
"Bus Stop"	2019	—N/a
"Underground Sun"	2023	—N/a
"Ride On"	2024	Logan Parks

== Notes ==
- A "Walkin' on the Sun" did not enter the Billboard Hot 100, but peaked at number 2 on the Hot 100 Airplay chart.
- B "Can't Get Enough of You, Baby" did not enter the Billboard Hot 100, but peaked at number 27 on the Hot 100 Airplay chart.
- C "Pacific Coast Party" did not enter the Billboard Hot 100, but peaked at number 14 on the Bubbling Under Hot 100 Singles chart, which acts as a 25-song extension to the Hot 100.
