= All Star Smash Hits =

Compilation album by Smash Mouth
- Released: August 23, 2005
- Recorded: 1996–2003
- Length: 61:15
- Label: Interscope
- Producers: Todd Kinnon (uncredited); Eric Valentine; Lyle Workman; Karl Derfler; Smash Mouth

Smash Mouth chronology
| Get the Picture? (2003) | All Star Smash Hits (2005) | The Gift of Rock (2005) |

Professional ratings
Review scores
| Source | Rating |
|---|---|
| Allmusic | 4/5 stars |

All Star Smash Hits is a compilation album by the American rock band Smash Mouth, released on August 23, 2005, by Interscope Records. It includes tracks from their first four albums and non-album material.

== Track listing ==
| No. | Title | Writer(s) | Original album | Length |
|---|---|---|---|---|
| 1. | "All Star" | Greg Camp | Astro Lounge (1999) | 3:20 |
| 2. | "Walkin' on the Sun" | Camp; Kevin Coleman; Paul De Lisle; Steve Harwell | Fush Yu Mang (1997) | 3:26 |
| 3. | "Flo" | Camp; Coleman; De Lisle; Harwell | Fush Yu Mang | 2:11 |
| 4. | "Beer Goggles" | Camp; Coleman; De Lisle; Harwell | Fush Yu Mang | 2:00 |
| 5. | "Why Can't We Be Friends?" | Papa Dee Allen; Harold Ray Brown; B. B. Dickerson; Lonnie Jordan; Charles Miller; Lee Oskar; Howard E. Scott; Jerry Goldstein | Fush Yu Mang | 4:46 |
| 6. | "Diggin' Your Scene" | Camp | Astro Lounge | 3:08 |
| 7. | "Waste" | Camp | Astro Lounge | 3:24 |
| 8. | "Then the Morning Comes" | Camp | Astro Lounge | 3:01 |
| 9. | "Come On, Come On" | Camp; Harwell | Astro Lounge | 2:32 |
| 10. | "Can't Get Enough of You Baby" | Sandy Linzer; Denny Randell | Astro Lounge | 2:31 |
| 11. | "Every Word Means No" | Mitch Easter | Fush Yu Mang | 2:45 |
| 12. | "Better Do It Right" | Camp | Dr. Seuss' How the Grinch Stole Christmas soundtrack (2000) | 3:10 |
| 13. | "Do It Again" | Walter Becker; Donald Fagen | Me, Myself & Irene soundtrack (2000) | 3:55 |
| 14. | "Holiday in My Head" | Camp | Smash Mouth (2001) | 2:40 |
| 15. | "Pacific Coast Party" | De Lisle | Smash Mouth | 2:58 |
| 16. | "I'm a Believer" | Neil Diamond | Smash Mouth | 3:03 |
| 17. | "Ain't No Mystery" | Camp | Austin Powers in Goldmember soundtrack (2002) | 3:56 |
| 18. | "Hang On" | Camp | Get the Picture? (2003) | 2:53 |
| 19. | "Always Gets Her Way" | Camp | Get the Picture? | 3:13 |
| 20. | "Getting Better" | Lennon–McCartney | The Cat in the Hat soundtrack (2003) | 2:23 |
| Total length: | | | | 61:15 |

== Chart performance ==
| Chart (2003) | Peak position |
|---|---|
| US Billboard 200 | 96 |

== Certifications ==
Certifications for All Star Smash Hits
| Region | Certification | Certified units/sales |
|---|---|---|
| New Zealand (RMNZ) | Gold | 7,500^{‡} |
^{‡} Sales+streaming figures based on certification alone.
