= Stephen Wesley =

American singer-songwriter

Stephen Wesley Cobb II
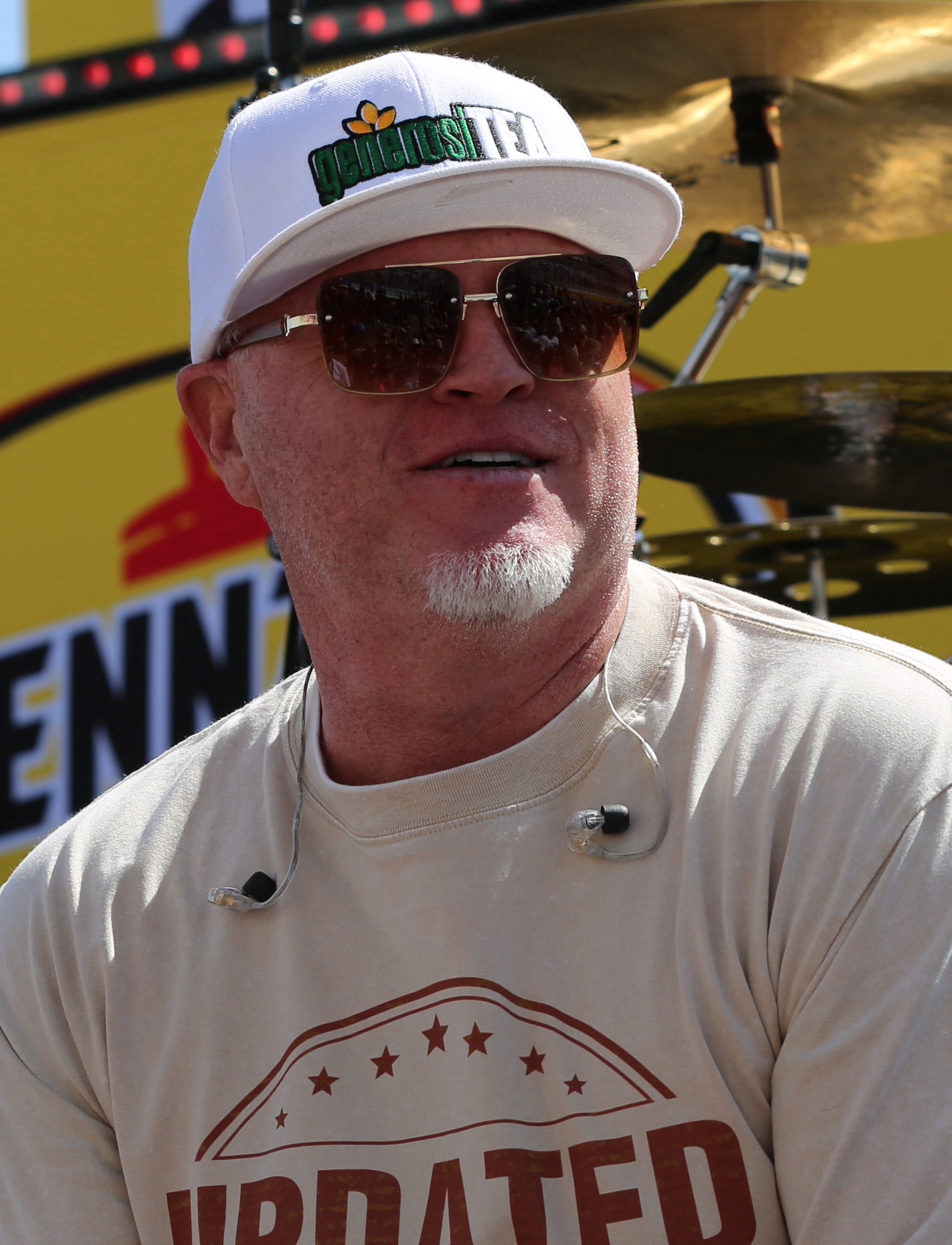
- Wesley at Las Vegas Motor Speedway in 2026
- Born: October 13, 1978 (age 47); Beech Grove, Indiana
- Occupation: Musician
- Website: Stephen Wesley on Facebook

Stephen Wesley (born October 13, 1978), is an American country music singer and songwriter. His notable collaborations include “Cowgirl” featuring Slash of Guns N' Roses, “All Night Long” featuring Steve Harwell of Smash Mouth, “South Shaker” featuring Bubba Sparxxx, and “Rock N Roll” featuring Grammy Award winning rapper T-Pain.

== Background ==
Wesley was born in Beech Grove, Indiana but spent most of his early life in Colorado and Texas.

At eighteen, Wesley found himself in prison with an eight-year sentence. After a chance encounter with the prison chaplain, Wesley discovered his love for music and was given the opportunity to learn the guitar and sing in the prison choir. For over six years, Wesley learned his craft as a musician and performed for inmates and the people of Colorado.

Upon his release from prison, Wesley made it his mission to create music and inspire people through his original songs. He continued this goal for eleven years before connecting with Leon Derrick Youngblood Sr, who immediately believed in Stephen's talent and connected with Kirk Lightburn from Sony music. That resulted in Stephen getting signed to Sony Records EnnEcho Records. This was his first music contract. Leon Derrick Youngblood Sr connected Stephen with his son Super producer "Roccstar" to do a remix of the chart-topping single "Cowgirl" along with the song's co-writer and producer Marc Jordan.

== Musical career ==
=== Cowgirl ===
Wesley released his popular song "Cowgirl" featuring Slash from Guns N' Roses fame as guitarist. The song was co-written and produced by record producer Marc Jordan. Leon Derrick Youngblood Sr was already working with Stephen and Stephen wanted his son Roccstar to produce the record Cowgirls. That was made possible by Leon Derrick Youngblood Sr. Jordan's hip hop infused remix of "Cowgirl" played on radio stations throughout the country and was the number one song in several markets.

=== Welcome to the Whiskey Creek Saloon ===
On July 27, 2015, Wesley released his album "Welcome to the Whiskey Creek Saloon." The album featured collaborations with Steve Harwell of Smash Mouth fame and rapper Bubba Sparxxx.

=== Rock N Roll ===
After a short break, Wesley returned to music, in 2018, releasing "Rock N Roll" with Grammy Award winning rapper T-Pain. Wesley spent almost two years recording the song in different ways. "I think I demoed it four times. The last time, I was so happy because I felt like it was my best work. I immediately texted T-Pain and asked if I could send it to him. I did. I waited about 15 minutes and his reply was, 'This is dope. Let's do it.' I'll never forget it. And the song took on a whole new life when he was done," Wesley said of the collaboration.

=== Break The Light ===
On September 24, 2020, Wesley's song "Break The Light" reached the #39 position on the Billboard Mainstream Top 40 Indicator Chart.
