= Smash Mouth (album) =

Studio album by Smash Mouth
- Released: November 27, 2001
- Recorded: 1999–2001
- Genre: Pop rock
- Length: 42:51
- Label: Interscope
- Producer: Eric Valentine

Smash Mouth chronology
Astro Lounge (1999)	Smash Mouth (2001)	Get the Picture? (2003)

Singles from Smash Mouth
- 1. "I'm a Believer" Released: August 14, 2001; 2. "Pacific Coast Party" Released: November 27, 2001; 3. "Holiday in My Head" Released: February 2002

Smash Mouth is the third studio album by American rock band of the same name. It was released on November 27, 2001, by Interscope Records. It is notable in that it was their first album with new drummer Michael Urbano and its release was delayed a few months due to the death of Steve Harwell's infant son, and the September 11 attacks. The album was eventually certified Gold by the RIAA for sales in excess of 500,000 in the U.S.

Smash Mouth held a contest on their website in the fall of 2000 to name their third album, with the winning suggestion being to self-title the album. Other suggested titles included A Fan Named The Record, The Ups Of The Downs, Sway, Words That End In Amberger, and Better Living Through Gambling. It was released in the fall of 2001 along with the single "Pacific Coast Party".

== Critical reception ==
Professional ratings
Aggregate scores
Source	Rating
Metacritic	67/100
Review scores
Source	Rating
AllMusic	3/5 stars
Blender	3/5 stars
Boston Phoenix	3/4 stars
E! Online	B−
Entertainment Weekly	A−
Maxim	2/5 stars
Melodic	2.5/5 stars
Rolling Stone	3/5 stars
Spin	6/10

Smash Mouth received generally favorable reviews from music critics. At Metacritic, which assigns a normalized rating out of 100 to reviews from mainstream critics, the album received an average score of 67, based on 7 reviews.

Entertainment Weekly writer Tom Sinclair praised the album for Steve Harwell's "real Zen wisdom" vocals and the band's "sunny, goofball approach" to creating "hooks, humor, and high jinks" throughout the track listing. J. D. Considine of Blender wrote that "even though there's nothing new, the album offers enough in the way of big-beat guitar and sing-along choruses to keep Smash Mouth on the charts (and MTV) for another two years." AllMusic's Stephen Thomas Erlewine also found "no new tricks" on the record but felt it was done "sharply, melodically, and happily", especially on the album cuts, concluding that: "If you've grooved on Smash Mouth's singles and want more of the same, this delivers reliably, which may be an unadorned pleasure for some and a guilty one for others."

Sean Richardson of the Boston Phoenix wrote that: "Underneath all the bells and whistles, Harwell shows more lyrical depth than your average family-themed rocker — Smash Mouth aren't meant to be taken too seriously, but they're not easily written off, either." A writer for E! Online critiqued that the record's "Xeroxed batch of overproduced, hyperactive pop songs" was prepared for backyard parties and mass media consumption, but highlighted "Out of Sight" and "Sister Psychic" for hinting that there's "some substance" amidst the "light-as-air pop flightiness". The A.V. Club's Stephen Thompson felt the album lacked the "overdriven polish" of Astro Lounge and noted that the addition of the Monkees' cover smacked of "chart-hungry desperation", but commended the band for being able to "offset[ting] its bald-faced mercenary intentions with a refreshing lack of pretension." David Peisner of Maxim was dumbfounded by the band's ability to make their songs sound "more disposable than the one before it", criticizing the "bouncy melodies and cheery demeanor" for overshadowing the "inconsequential" lyrics.

== Track listing ==
All tracks are written by Greg Camp, except where noted.

No.	Title	Writer(s)	Length
1.	"Holiday in My Head"		2:40
2.	"Your Man"		3:36
3.	"Pacific Coast Party"	Camp; Paul De Lisle	2:58
4.	"She Turns Me On"	Paul Cafaro; Eric Valentine	3:12
5.	"Sister Psychic"		3:16
6.	"Out of Sight"		2:56
7.	"Force Field"		3:49
8.	"Shoes 'n' Hats"		2:48
9.	"Hold You High"		3:01
10.	"The In Set"		3:41
11.	"Disenchanted"		4:16
12.	"Keep It Down"		5:31
13.	"I'm a Believer" (the Monkees cover)	Neil Diamond	3:07
Total length:			42:51

Japanese edition bonus tracks
No.	Title	Writer(s)	Length
14.	"All Star"		3:21
15.	"Walkin' on the Sun"	Camp; De Lisle; Steve Harwell; Kevin Coleman	3:27
16.	"Pacific Coast Party" (Olav Basoski remix)	De Lisle	7:58

Australasia edition bonus tracks
No.	Title	Writer(s)	Length
14.	"All Star"		3:21
15.	"Can't Get Enough of You Baby"	Sandy Linzer; Denny Randell	2:30

== Personnel ==
=== Smash Mouth ===
- Steve Harwell – lead vocals, piano
- Paul De Lisle – bass guitar, backing vocals
- Greg Camp – guitars, backing vocals
- Michael Urbano – drums, programming

Touring members

- Michael Klooster – keyboard
- Mark Cervantes – percussion
- Sam Eigen – guitar

=== Additional personnel ===
- Lewis Castle – trumpet
- Mike Busbee – trombone
- Rich Seinhauser – trombone
- Eric Valentine – producer, engineer, mixer
- David Campbell – string arrangements

== Charts ==
=== Weekly charts ===
Weekly chart performance for Smash Mouth
Chart (2001)	Peak position
Australian Albums (ARIA)	70
New Zealand Albums (RMNZ)	46
US Billboard 200	48

=== Year-end charts ===
Year-end chart performance for Smash Mouth
Chart (2002)	Position
Canadian Alternative Albums (Nielsen SoundScan)	198

== Certifications ==
Certifications for Smash Mouth
Region	Certification	Certified units/sales
United States (RIAA)	Gold	500,000^{^}
^{^} Shipments figures based on certification alone.
