= Get the Picture? (Smash Mouth album) =

Studio album by Smash Mouth
- Released: August 5, 2003
- Recorded: 2002–2003
- Genres: Pop rock; power pop; ska punk
- Length: 36:36
- Label: Interscope
- Producers: Smash Mouth; Karl Derfler

Smash Mouth chronology
Smash Mouth (2001)	Get the Picture? (2003)	All Star Smash Hits (2005)

Singles from Get the Picture?
- 1. "You Are My Number One" Released: October 27, 2003; 2. "Hang On" Released: November 4, 2003; 3. "Always Gets Her Way" Released: January 5, 2004

Professional ratings
Aggregate scores
Source	Rating
Metacritic	61/100
Review scores
Source	Rating
AllMusic	3/5 stars
Blender	4/5 stars
E! Online	D
Entertainment Weekly	B−
Rolling Stone	3/5 stars

Get the Picture? is the fourth studio album by American rock band Smash Mouth. It was released on August 5, 2003 by Interscope Records. The first released single was "You Are My Number One", which was written by Neil Diamond, and featured guest vocals by Ranking Roger.

"Hang On" was also released as a single, and appears in the end credits of the live-action film adaptation of Dr. Seuss' children's book The Cat in the Hat. A music video for the song was also released, designed specifically for the film. The song "Hot" appeared in the films Hot Wheels: World Race and Diary of a Wimpy Kid and an episode of What's New, Scooby Doo?. "You Are My Number One" was used in the season six premiere of the show Charmed.

The art for the album was created by Shag.

== Track listing ==
All tracks are written by Greg Camp, except where noted.

No.	Title	Writer(s)	Length
1.	"Hang On"		2:53
2.	"Always Gets Her Way"		3:12
3.	"You Are My Number One" (featuring Ranking Roger)	Neil Diamond	2:32
4.	"Whole Lotta Love"		3:32
5.	"Space Man"		4:14
6.	"Hot"		2:31
7.	"Looking for a Wall"		3:18
8.	"Seventh Grade Dance"		3:30
9.	"105"		3:31
10.	"Fun"		2:39
11.	"New Planet"	Paul De Lisle, Camp	2:17
12.	"You Are My Number One" (Radio Remix)	Diamond	2:33
Total length:			36:36

UK bonus track
No.	Title	Length
13.	"Get the Picture?"	2:59

== Personnel ==
Smash Mouth

- Steve Harwell – vocals
- Paul De Lisle – bass, backing vocals
- Greg Camp – guitars, backing vocals, additional keyboards and turntables
- Michael Urbano – drums, drum programming

Additional personnel

- Matt Mahaffey, Michael Klooster – additional keyboards
- Ranking Roger – additional toasting, vocals (track 3)

== Chart performance ==
Chart (2003)	Peak position
US Billboard 200	100
