= Getting Better =

- Cover of the Northern Songs sheet music

Song by the Beatles

from the album Sgt. Pepper's Lonely Hearts Club Band
- Released: 26 May 1967
- Recorded: 9–10, 21, 23 March 1967
- Studio: EMI, London
- Genre: Pop rock
- Length: 2:47
- Label: Parlophone
- Songwriter: Lennon–McCartney
- Producer: George Martin

"Getting Better" is a song by the English rock band the Beatles from their 1967 album Sgt. Pepper's Lonely Hearts Club Band. It was written mainly by Paul McCartney, with some of the lyrics written by John Lennon, and credited to the Lennon–McCartney partnership.

== Composition ==
The song has been said to be musically reminiscent of the Beatles' hit single "Penny Lane". It moves forward by way of regular chords, produced by Lennon and George Harrison's electric guitar. George Martin plays Pianet and piano, on the latter bypassing the keyboard and directly striking the strings. These heavily accented and repetitive lines cause the song to sound as if it is based on a drone. Harrison added an Indian tambura part to the final verse, which further accentuates this impact. The sound of the percussion introduced in this section combines with the tambura to create an Indian mood.

McCartney's bassline, in counterpoint to this droning, was described by music critic Ian MacDonald as "dreamy" and "well thought out as a part of the production by McCartney". It was recorded after the main track was completed, as were many of the bass lines on Sgt Pepper's Lonely Hearts Club Band. Starting out in the verse with a pedal on the root note (G) that leaps two octaves, McCartney moves to a marching quarter-note (walking) bass line for the first (and only the first) chorus. In stark contrast, all subsequent choruses are played using a fluid, swing feel, full of anticipated notes that propel the song forward despite the quarter-note droning of the guitar and keyboard.

According to Beatles biographer Hunter Davies and MacDonald, the initial idea for the song's title came from a phrase often spoken by Jimmie Nicol, the group's stand-in drummer for the Australian leg of their 1964 world tour. The title and music suggest optimism, but some of the song's lyrics have a more negative tone. In this sense, it reflects the contrasting personas of the two songwriters. In response to McCartney's line, "It's getting better all the time", Lennon replies, "Can't get no worse!" In a December 1983 interview, McCartney praised this contribution as an example of things he "couldn't ever have done [him]self". In a 1969 interview, Lennon cited "Getting Better" as an example of "pure Beatles" music, whereby, with the four band members developing a song, "we've all written it and we've all turned it into sort of pure Beatle."

In a 1980 interview in Playboy with John Lennon and Yoko Ono, Lennon, when asked about the song, said that the song's lyrics came personally from his own experience abusing women in relationships in the past. He states: "It is a diary form of writing. All that 'I used to be cruel to my woman / I beat her and kept her apart from the things that she loved' was me. I used to be cruel to my woman, and physically – any woman. I was a hitter. I couldn't express myself and I hit. I fought men and I hit women. That is why I am always on about peace, you see. It is the most violent people who go for love and peace. Everything's the opposite. But I sincerely believe in love and peace. I am a violent man who has learned not to be violent and regrets his violence. I will have to be a lot older before I can face in public how I treated women as a youngster."

According to Beatles biographer Hunter Davies, the phrase popped into McCartney's head one day in 1967 while he was walking his sheepdog Martha in Hampstead.

‘Getting Better’ I wrote on my magic Binder, Edwards and Vaughan piano in my music room. It had a lovely tone, that piano, you'd just open the lid and there was such a magic tone, almost out of tune, and of course the way it was painted added to the fun of it all. It's an optimistic song. I often try and get on to optimistic subjects in an effort to cheer myself up and also, realising that other people are going to hear this, to cheer them up too. And this was one of those. The 'angry young man' and all that was John and I filling in the verses about schoolteachers. We shared a lot of feelings against teachers who had punished you too much or who hadn't understood you or who had just been b******s generally.

== Lennon's LSD incident ==
One of the recording sessions for "Getting Better" is infamous for an incident involving Lennon. During the 21 March 1967 session in which producer George Martin added a piano solo to "Lovely Rita", Lennon complained that he did not feel well and could not focus. He had accidentally taken LSD when he meant to take an upper. Unaware of the mistake, Martin took him up to the roof of EMI Studios for some fresh air, and returned to Studio Two where McCartney and Harrison were waiting. They knew why Lennon was not well, and upon hearing where Lennon was, rushed to the roof to retrieve him and prevent a possible accident.

== Personnel ==
According to Ian MacDonald:

- Paul McCartney – double-tracked vocals, bass guitar, handclapping
- John Lennon – backing vocals, rhythm guitar, handclapping
- George Harrison – backing vocals, lead guitar, tambura, handclapping
- Ringo Starr – drums, congas, handclapping
- George Martin – piano, pianet

== Live performances ==
Paul McCartney performed the song live for the first time by any Beatle on his 2002 Driving World Tour. He later reprised the song on his 2003 Back in the World Tour.

== Smash Mouth version ==
American rock band Smash Mouth performed a cover of "Getting Better", minus the bridge about being cruel to his woman, for the soundtrack album to the 2003 children's film The Cat in the Hat. The song was published by Interscope Records. The song was also featured on Smash Mouth's compilation album All Star Smash Hits, released in August 2005.

== Sources ==
- Pollack, Alan W. (31 December 1995). "Notes on "Getting Better"". "Notes on" Series. Archived from the original on 17 April 2012.
- The Beatles (2000). The Beatles Anthology. San Francisco: Chronicle Books. ISBN 0-8118-2684-8.
- Echard, William (2017). Psychedelic Popular Music: A History Through Musical Topic Theory. Bloomington, IN: Indiana University Press. ISBN 978-0-253-02659-0.
- Emerick, Geoff; Massey, Howard (2006). Here, There and Everywhere: My Life Recording the Music of the Beatles. New York: Penguin Books. ISBN 1-59240-179-1.
- Everett, Walter (1999). The Beatles as Musicians: Revolver Through the Anthology. Oxford University Press. ISBN 978-0-19-512941-0.
- Lewisohn, Mark (1988). The Beatles Recording Sessions. New York: Harmony Books. ISBN 0-517-57066-1.
- MacDonald, Ian (2005). Revolution in the Head: The Beatles' Records and the Sixties (Second Revised ed.). London: Pimlico (Rand). ISBN 1-84413-828-3.
- Miles, Barry (1997). Paul McCartney: Many Years From Now. New York: Henry Holt & Company. ISBN 0-8050-5249-6.
- Sheff, David (2000). All We Are Saying: The Last Major Interview with John Lennon and Yoko Ono. New York: St. Martin's Press. ISBN 0-312-25464-4.
- Spitz, Bob (2005). The Beatles: The Biography. Boston: Little, Brown. ISBN 0-316-80352-9.
- Unterberger, Richie (2009). "Review of "Getting Better"".
- Davies, Hunter (1967). "Notes on 'Getting Better'".
