= The Gift of Rock =

Studio album by Smash Mouth
- Released: 2005
- Studios: The Hearse (Berkeley, California); The Club House (New York City); Sound Management Studios (Elsternwick, Victoria, Australia)
- Genres: Alternative rock; Christmas
- Length: 26:25; 26:07 (reissue)
- Label: Beautiful Bomb
- Producers: Greg Camp; Michael Urbano

Smash Mouth chronology
All Star Smash Hits (2005)	The Gift of Rock (2005)	Summer Girl (2006)

The Gift of Rock is the fifth studio album by American rock band Smash Mouth. Released in 2005 through the band’s own Beautiful Bomb Records, the album contains mostly covers of Christmas songs by various artists including Louis Armstrong, Ringo Starr, the Kinks, and the Ramones. It was reissued in 2012 by 429 Records, replacing the original song "Baggage Claim" with the Pretenders' "2000 Miles".

This is the band's first Christmas album, with the second, Missile Toes, being released in November 2023.

== Track listing ==
2005 release
No.	Title	Writer(s)	Original artist	Length
1.	"Father Christmas"	Ray Davies	The Kinks	3:38
2.	"Baggage Claim"	Greg Camp	Smash Mouth	3:31
3.	"Don't Believe in Christmas"	Gerald W. Roslie	The Sonics	1:47
4.	"Christmas (Baby Please Come Home)"	Jeff Barry; Ellie Greenwich; Phil Spector	Darlene Love	3:14
5.	"Zat You, Santa Claus?"	Jack Fox	Louis Armstrong	2:19
6.	"The Christmas Song"	Sune Rose Wagner	Sune Rose Wagner	2:34
7.	"Snoopy's Christmas"	George David Weiss; Hugo & Luigi	The Royal Guardsmen	2:15
8.	"Christmas Ain't Christmas"	Buck Owens	Buck Owens	2:03
9.	"Come On Christmas, Christmas Come On"	Richard Starkey; Mark Hudson; Dean Grakal	Ringo Starr	2:23
10.	"Merry Christmas (I Don't Want to Fight Tonight)"	Jeffrey Hyman	Ramones	2:36
Total length:				26:25

2012 reissue
No.	Title	Writer(s)	Original artist	Length
1.	"Father Christmas"	Davies	The Kinks	3:38
2.	"Don't Believe in Christmas"	Roslie	The Sonics	1:47
3.	"Christmas (Baby Please Come Home)"	Barry; Greenwich; Spector	Darlene Love	3:14
4.	"Zat You, Santa Claus?"	Fox	Armstrong	2:19
5.	"The Christmas Song"	Wagner	Sune Rose Wagner	2:34
6.	"Snoopy's Christmas"	Weiss; Hugo & Luigi	The Royal Guardsmen	2:15
7.	"Christmas Ain't Christmas"	Buck Owens	Owens	2:03
8.	"Come On Christmas, Christmas Come On"	Starkey; Hudson; Grakal	Ringo Starr	2:23
9.	"Merry Christmas (I Don't Want to Fight Tonight)"	Hyman	Ramones	2:36
10.	"2000 Miles"	Christine Hynde	The Pretenders	3:25
Total length:				26:07

== Personnel ==
Smash Mouth

- Steve Harwell – vocals
- Greg Camp – guitars, backing vocals
- Paul De Lisle – bass, backing vocals
- Michael Urbano – drums, percussion

Additional musicians

- Dave Palmer – keyboards
- Sunshine F. Becker, Joey Blake, Vernon Bush, Brian Dyer, Zoe Lynne Ellis, Leah Tysse, Ellen Van Den and James White – choir

=== Production ===
- Greg Camp – producer
- Michael Urbano – producer
- Reto Peter – engineer, mixing
- Michael Rodriguez – engineer
- Brad Kobylczak – additional engineer
- Chris Bellman – mastering at Bernie Grundman Mastering (Hollywood, California)
- Kelly Castro – art direction, design, photography
- Robert Hayes for Sound Management, Inc. – management
