= Smash Mouth =

American rock band

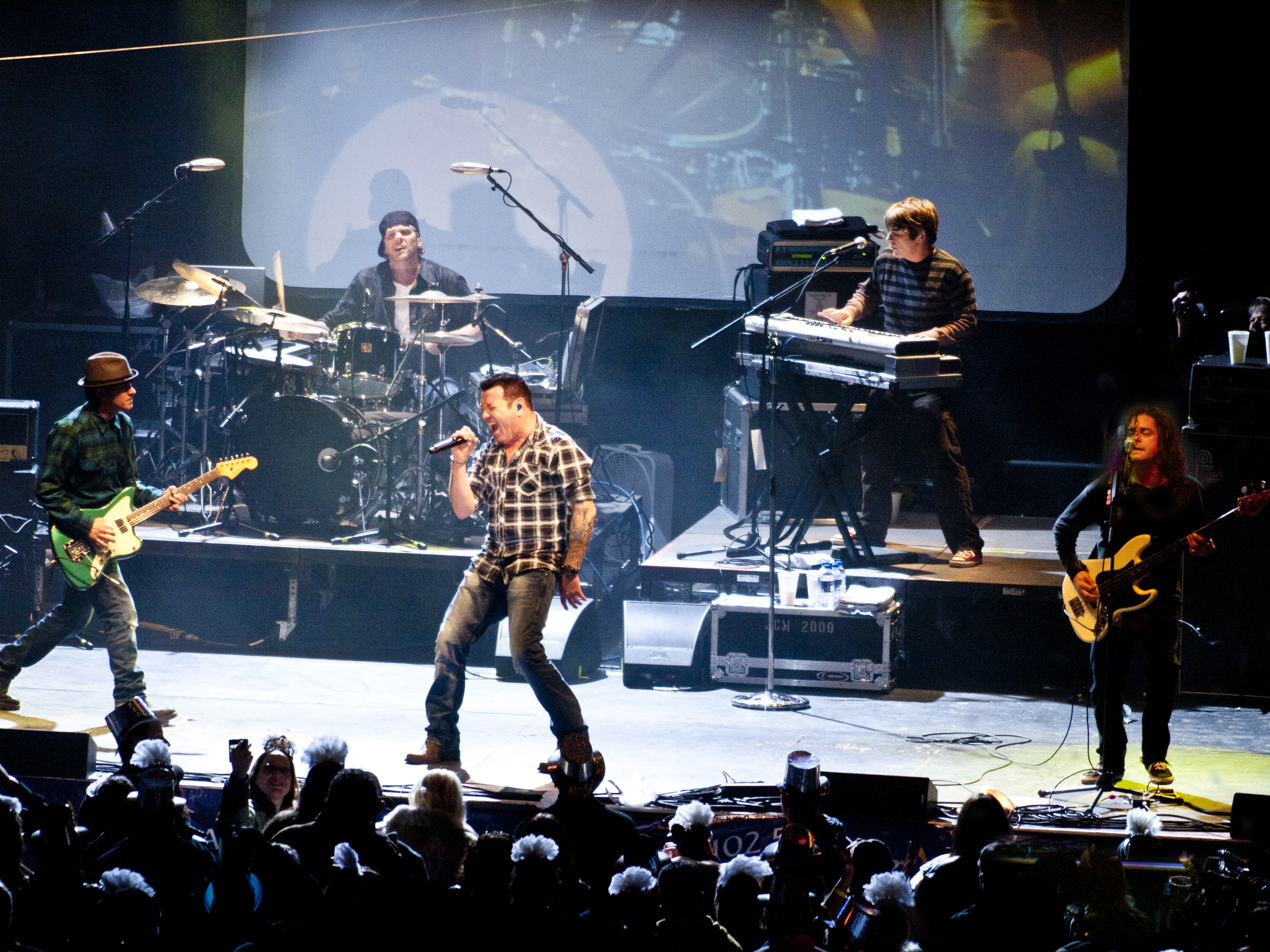
- Smash Mouth performing in 2011

Background information
- Also known as: Smashmouth (1994–1996)
- Origin: San Jose, California, U.S.
- Genres: Alternative rock; power pop; pop rock; ska punk
- Works: Discography
- Years active: 1994–present
- Labels: Interscope; UMG; Beautiful Bomb; 429; Oglio; Warner-Tamerlane; Cleopatra
- Members: Paul De Lisle; Michael Klooster; Randy Cooke; Sean Hurwitz; Zach Goode
- Past members: Steve Harwell; Greg Camp; Kevin Coleman; Michael Urbano; Mitch Marine; Jason Sutter; Leroy Miller; Charlie Paxson; Mike Krompass; Sam Eigen
- Website: smashmouth.com

Smash Mouth is an American rock band from San Jose, California. The band was formed in 1994 and was originally composed of Steve Harwell (lead vocals), Kevin Coleman (drums), Greg Camp (guitar), and Paul De Lisle (bass). Harwell's departure in 2021 left De Lisle as the sole remaining original member. They are known for their songs "Walkin' on the Sun" (1997), "All Star" (1999), and "Then the Morning Comes" (1999), as well as a cover of the Monkees' "I'm a Believer" (2001).

The band adopted retro styles covering several decades of popular music. They have also performed numerous covers of popular songs, including War's "Why Can't We Be Friends?", Rick Astley's "Never Gonna Give You Up", Simple Minds' "Don't You (Forget About Me)", ? & the Mysterians' "Can't Get Enough of You Baby", the Beatles' "Getting Better", Queen's "Under Pressure", House of Pain's "Jump Around", and "I Wan'na Be Like You" from The Jungle Book. They also composed two songs for the South Korean animated film Pororo, The Racing Adventure: "Beside Myself" and "Everything Just Crazy".

The group's debut album Fush Yu Mang has been certified platinum twice by the RIAA and their second album Astro Lounge has since been certified platinum thrice. Their song "All Star" was nominated for a Grammy Award for Best Pop Performance by a Duo or Group with Vocals in 2001.

== History ==
=== 1990–1997: formation and Fush Yu Mang ===
Smash Mouth's roots trace back to 1990 when Steve Harwell and Kevin Coleman met. Smash Mouth was then formed in 1994 by Harwell, who had formerly played in a rap group called F.O.S. (Freedom of Speech). Coleman, who was Harwell's manager, knew guitarist Greg Camp and bassist Paul De Lisle, who had both played in a local punk band, and introduced the three musicians to each other. They began rehearsing together along with Coleman, who played drums. They soon developed into a band, and named themselves Smashmouth, an American football term. During their early years, the band played largely rock music.

The band's first publicity came when a demo of the song "Nervous in the Alley" was played by a San Jose radio station, KOME. Soon after, Interscope Records signed the band, and the group's debut album, Fush Yu Mang, was released in 1997, featuring another member: the keyboardist Michael Klooster. Also, upon signing to Interscope Records, the band changed their name from Smashmouth to Smash Mouth. The album saw commercial success peaking at number 19 on the US Billboard 200 and number 23 in Canada. It was led by the band's first major single "Walkin' on the Sun" which peaked at number 1 on the US Adult Top 40 and Alternative Songs charts and at number 3 in Canada. The singles "The Fonz" and a cover of "Why Can't We Be Friends" from the 1998 Kevin Bacon film Wild Things were also subsequently released. The album has since gone double platinum. During this time the band officially started touring regularly even opening for U2 on their PopMart Tour and got their first television appearance as the musical guest on episode 157 of Oddville, MTV.

=== 1998–2004: rise to fame, Astro Lounge, Smash Mouth, and Get the Picture? ===
The band's second album, Astro Lounge, was released in 1999 and marked a change in direction, as it had less of the previous ska influence and more of a pop sound. It led to more publicity for the band, and ended up being one of the most critically acclaimed albums from the group. It peaked at number 6 on the US Billboard 200, the highest the band has ever charted in the states, and reached the top 20 in both Canada and New Zealand. Supported by the hit single "All Star" (which was featured in several film soundtracks, most notably in Shrek (2001), although the official music video references Mystery Men) the song reached number 4 on both the Billboard hot 100 and Australia it then charted even higher in Canada peaking at number 2. "Then the Morning Comes" was also a hit for the band and peaked a number 11 on the Billboard hot 100. Astro Lounge has since been certified as triple platinum. Due to the rise in popularity Smash Mouth started to perform at more notable events including the 1999 Home Run Derby in July at Fenway Park after the band finished playing, Greg Camp said "Save Fenway Park", referencing plans to demolish the stadium and replace it with a new facility; this elicited boos from the crowd. On September 9, 1999, they performed in pouring rain, as the opening act of the 1999 MTV Video Music Awards. They also made appearances on the Late Show with David Letterman, The Tonight Show with Jay Leno and Late Night with Conan O'Brien.

Also in 1999, The East Bay Sessions was released as a collection of early songs. Shortly after the release of the album, drummer Kevin Coleman left the band due to back problems. He was initially replaced by Michael Urbano, who was quickly replaced by Mitch Marine for the tour supporting Astro Lounge, who was subsequently replaced by Urbano again after the tour.

In 2000 the band was nominated for a for Best Pop Performance by a Duo or Group with Vocals at the 42nd Annual Grammy Awards for the song "All Star".

In 2001, Smash Mouth covered the Monkees' hit song "I'm a Believer". It peaked at number 25 on the Billboard hot 100 and was featured on both the soundtrack for Shrek (along with "All Star") and their self-titled album which was released on November 21, 2001. The album sold fewer copies than the band's earlier works peaking at number 48 on the Billboard 200, but it has since been certified gold. Also in 2001, the group appeared as themselves in the climactic scene of the film Rat Race.

On September 26, 2001, the band appeared on Drew Carey's Back-to-School Rock 'n' Roll Comedy Hour. In 2002 the band played select shows as the opener for NSYNC on their Celebrity Tour.

In 2003, Get the Picture? was released, It is their last studio album to chart in the US. Peaking at number 100 on the Billboard 200. It featured the singles "You Are My Number One", "Hang On" and "Always Gets Her Way". Smash Mouth was dropped from Interscope shortly after the release of Get the Picture?. The songs "Hang On" and their cover of "Getting Better" both appeared on the soundtrack for The Cat in the Hat. That same year, the band performed a cover of the Sherman Brothers song "I Wanna Be Like You" for the animated film The Jungle Book 2. Also in 2003 the band appeared in animated form in the Television show Kim Possible, in the episode "Queen Bee" where their animated counterparts played the song "Come On, Come On".

=== 2005–2011: new label, fluctuating lineup and Summer Girl ===
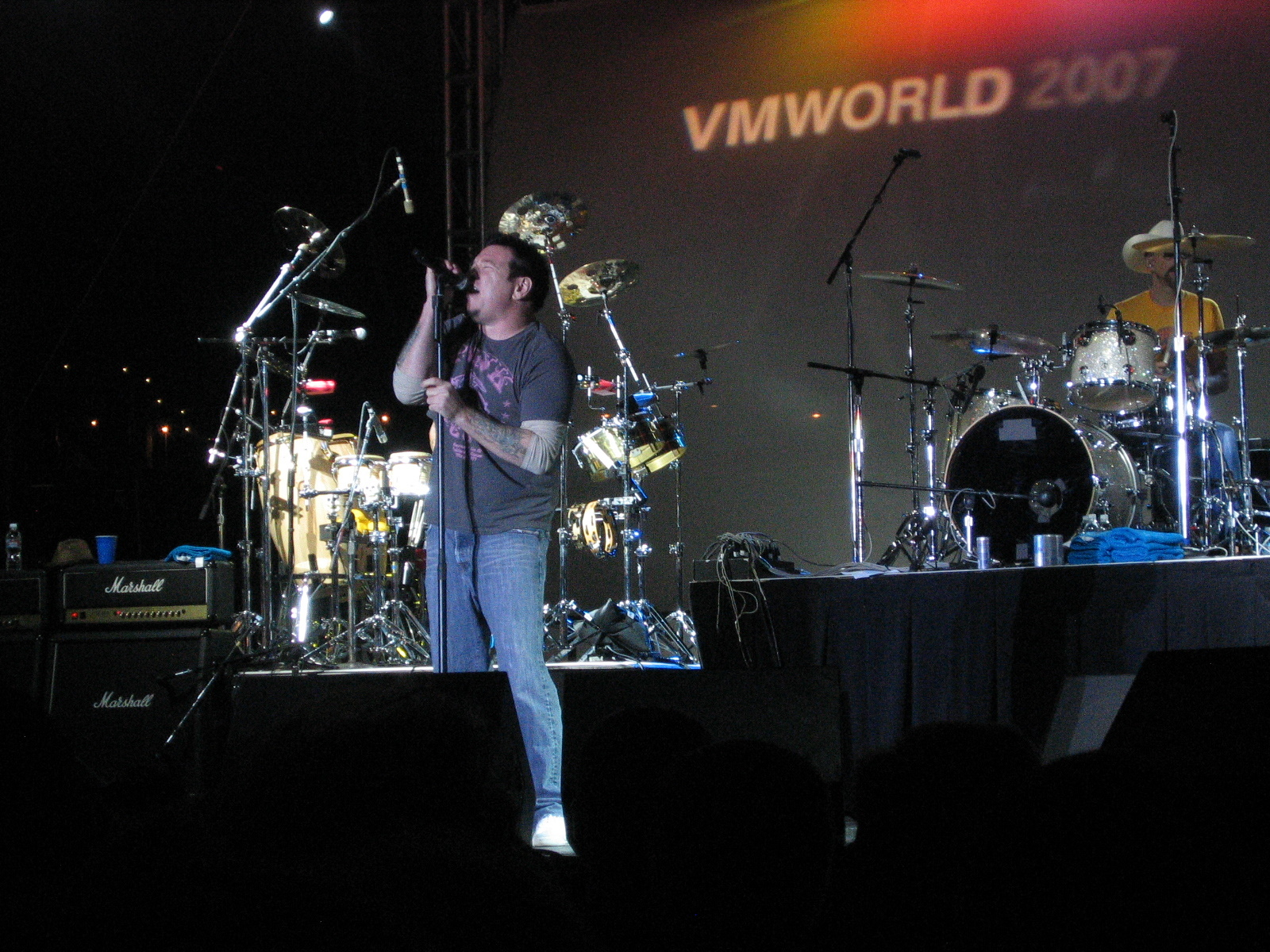
Smash Mouth performing in 2007

Smash Mouth released the greatest hits compilation All Star Smash Hits in 2005. The album contains some more popular songs from previous Smash Mouth albums, as well as songs from soundtrack albums that were not on the band's releases. On certain networks and time slots, the album was advertised as having 18 tracks, including an edited version of "Flo". Smash Mouth played at Gumby's Birthday Celebration in August 2005. That same year the group once again appeared in animated form in an episode of What's New, Scooby-Doo? titled "Reef Grief".

In December 2005, the band released a Christmas album Gift of Rock. It featured covers of Christmas songs by many artists, such as the Kinks and the Ramones, and one original song, "Baggage Claim".

Smash Mouth's fifth studio album, originally to be titled Old Habits, was recorded in 2005 and expected to be released in early 2006. The band had said that the album was much more like the ska punk featured on Fush Yu Mang and The East Bay Sessions. In September 2005, the band performed what was tentatively going to be the album's first single, "Getaway Car", on Last Call with Carson Daly. The album was delayed many times, in the hope of gaining publicity with Harwell's appearance on the reality show The Surreal Life. Smash Mouth returned to the studio intent on improving the record. Old Habits was shelved, replaced by Summer Girl, which included some remixed Old Habits tracks as well as new songs. After being delayed in much the same way Old Habits was for several months, the album was released on September 19, 2006. Smash Mouth let Sony Pictures use much of their music from Summer Girl and other songs for the movie Zoom, whose opening titles credit the film's music to the band.

Before the release of Summer Girl, drummer Michael Urbano left the band without warning on February 14, 2006, due to creative differences. He was initially replaced by former drummer Mitch Marine, and then by Jason Sutter, best known for his work with American Hi-Fi and the Rembrandts. The band released their new album, Summer Girl, later that year. In early 2007, one year after joining the band, Sutter left Smash Mouth to play drums for former Soundgarden and Audioslave frontman Chris Cornell; fill-in drummer Marine returned to Smash Mouth.

Band members changed over the course of several years. Greg Camp left the band in the summer of 2008. Smash Mouth recruited Leroy Miller to play guitar. Leroy left in 2009 and Camp returned to the band, but in 2011 Camp left once again and this time the band recruited Sean Hurwitz. Hurwitz stayed until 2012, and was replaced by Mike Krompass. Later in 2012, Hurwitz returned. In 2009 Mitch Marine left once again and was replaced by Urbano, who left again after only one year in 2010, and was replaced by Marine once again. Marine left yet again after a brief spell in 2010 and was replaced by Randy Cooke. Cooke was briefly replaced by Jason Sutter in 2011, then Charlie Paxson.

In June 2011, a writer at Something Awful offered $20 if the band's lead singer, Steve Harwell, would eat 24 eggs. Others on Twitter began offering additional sums, eventually targeted to various charities. In July 2011, Harwell accepted the challenge if fans could gather pledges of $10,000 for St. Jude Children's Hospital. The fundraising goal was reached in less than a week. A self-styled "reality TV fan", Harwell requested that his friend celebrity chef Guy Fieri prepare the eggs. The event was held at Johnny Garlic's restaurant, in Dublin, California, on October 11, 2011. With about 150 people attending, Harwell was able to finish the eggs with the help of audience members as well as the San Jose Sharks mascot, Sharkie. $15,000 was raised for charity.

On July 17, 2011, Smash Mouth performed live at the Hard Rock Cafe on the Vegas Strip, airing a 60-minute concert simultaneously across the US & Canada on HDNet Television, CBS Radio, and CBS Digital.

=== 2012–2019: Magic, live album and reunion with Camp ===
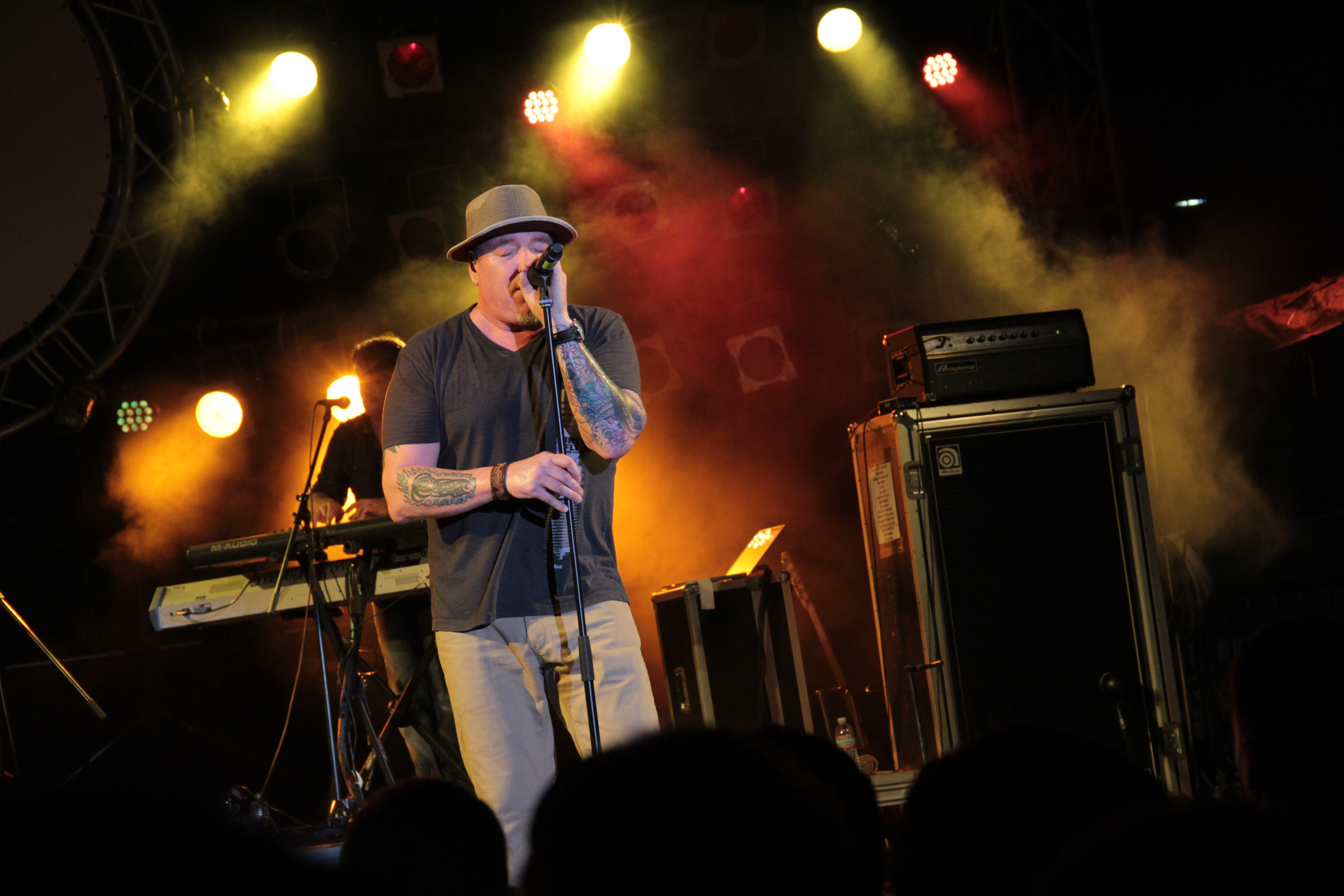
Smash Mouth at Kinser Fest in 2013

After parting ways with Universal Records and signing with 429 Records, Smash Mouth released their sixth studio album titled Magic, on September 4, 2012. The album was primarily produced by new band member Mike Krompass. The first single, also entitled "Magic", debuted on the Billboard Adult Contemporary chart at No. 22. The band spent the rest of 2012 touring behind the new project as well as promoting the release of their musical book of food recipes and things of the like — Recipes from the Road. Cooke temporarily left again toward the end of 2012, replaced by Paxson. In 2013 the band took part in the "Under the Sun" tour with Gin Blossoms and Sugar Ray. Paxson left in July during the tour, and was initially going to be replaced by a returning Cooke; however, he was replaced by Sutter once again. Tod Burr, former drum tech of Def Leppard and drummer of Merle Jagger, came on board in 2012 as drum and keyboard tech of Smash Mouth.

On February 1, 2013, Smash Mouth headlined the AutoNation Coast to Coast rebranding event (which combined all AutoNation dealerships into a single brand) at Wayne Huizenga Park in Fort Lauderdale, Florida with Michela Paige from Season 3 of The Voice. The event also served as a final round in the AutoNation Culture of Caring Contest. They also took part in the first "Under the Sun" tour alongside Sugar Ray, Gin Blossoms, and Vertical Horizon.

On October 6, 2014, Smash Mouth composed two songs for the English version of the South Korean animated film Pororo, The Racing Adventure, including "Beside Myself", and "Everything Just Crazy" which plays at the end credits.

In 2014, Smash Mouth was part of the second "Under the Sun" tour with Uncle Kracker, Blues Traveler, and Sugar Ray.

On June 14, 2015, Smash Mouth performed at the Taste of Fort Collins food festival in Fort Collins, Colorado. Before the encore, in an incident that lasted about three minutes, singer Steve Harwell became angry, yelled profanities at the audience, and left the stage after bread that had been distributed by the festival was thrown in the air and a few pieces were reportedly thrown onto the stage. Harwell later apologized for the incident in an interview with The Herald-Mail. Event organizer Jason Ornstein explained that he asked Harwell if he wanted him to have the DJs make an announcement instructing the crowd not to throw bread but according to Ornstein, Harwell "stormed on [stage] and took matters into his own hands". He continued "It wasn't like anyone was going to be getting hurt by throwing bread up in the air ... We just had to laugh at it, because he just really made a fool of himself." Fort Collins Police Services stated laws prohibiting disorderly conduct, harassment, and "throwing of "missiles", i.e. objects, apply to event attendees.

In May 2016, Smash Mouth released their first live album titled Playlist: The Very Best of Smash Mouth through Sony Music. The recordings were harvested from shows in Rapid City, South Dakota, and Manila.

2016 saw the band gain a new member in Sam Eigen and the return of Cooke. Eigen is a long-time friend of both Steve Harwell and Paul De Lisle, and has played with Alanis Morissette, Janet Jackson, and John Fogerty. He can also be heard playing guitar on several of Harwell's solo recordings over the years.

Smash Mouth performed at the Urbana Sweetcorn Festival on August 28, 2016; Harwell passed out in the middle of the set and was taken to a nearby hospital, but the band continued their set and performed the song without him. Harwell made a full recovery and they continued touring.

Greg Camp rejoined Smash Mouth in early 2018. An acoustic re-recording of Smash Mouth's first album, Fush Yu Mang, funded through PledgeMusic was released in 2018 for the album's 20th anniversary.

On November 1, 2018, Smash Mouth released the single "Unity". It features hip-hop artists Kool Keith and Darryl McDaniels of Run-DMC. They then toured Australia in the same year during November to sell-out crowds around the country, performing a mix of theater, festival, and pub shows. During the Arlie Beach Festival of Music in Queensland, Steve Harwell became ill and had to leave the stage. However, Nicky Bomba, Frankie J Holden, Wilbur Wilde from Melbourne Ska Orchestra, and the remainder of Smash Mouth continued the set without him. Harwell recovered the next day and the Australian tour continued without any further incidents. In 2019, the band released a cover of the Hollies' song, "Bus Stop".

=== 2020–2023: Harwell's departure and death, arrival of Goode and Missile Toes ===
On August 8, 2020, the band performed at the 2020 Sturgis Rally and vocalist Harwell said things such as "fuck that COVID shit" during the performance. A report from the IZA Institute of Labor Economics later cited the event as being a superspreading event.

In October 2021, the band performed at The Big Sip beer and wine festival in Bethel, New York. Harwell appeared to be intoxicated, threatening audience members and performing what looked like a Nazi salute. Following the performance, Harwell announced his retirement due to ongoing health issues. Prior to Harwell's last show, the band was already performing with a substitute singer ostensibly filling in while Harwell dealt with his health issues.

Zach Goode on stage in 2026

In March 2022, it was announced upon Steve Harwell's departure, that the band recruited new lead singer Zach Goode (formerly of Ghoulspoon, Divided By Zero and The Secret Seven). On March 2, 2022, the band released a cover of Rick Astley's song "Never Gonna Give You Up". Smash Mouth released a new single, "4th of July", on July 1, 2022.

On July 28, 2023, the band released "Underground Sun" as a single. The music video was created using AI.

On September 3, 2023, it was announced that Harwell was receiving hospice care and was expected to have only days left to live. Harwell died the next day at his home in Boise, Idaho, surrounded by family and friends, at the age of 56 from liver failure. The band put out an official statement in his tribute "Steve Harwell was a true American Original. A larger than life character who shot up into the sky like a Roman candle. Steve will be remembered for his unwavering focus and impassioned determination to reach the heights of pop stardom."

On November 6, 2023, the band announced their second Christmas album, Missile Toes, which released on November 17. The album consists of 10 songs, six of which are covers of classic Christmas songs, and four of which are originals. Featured artists Susanna Hoffs and Sophie Grey make appearances.

=== 2024–present: Mercury Comet ===
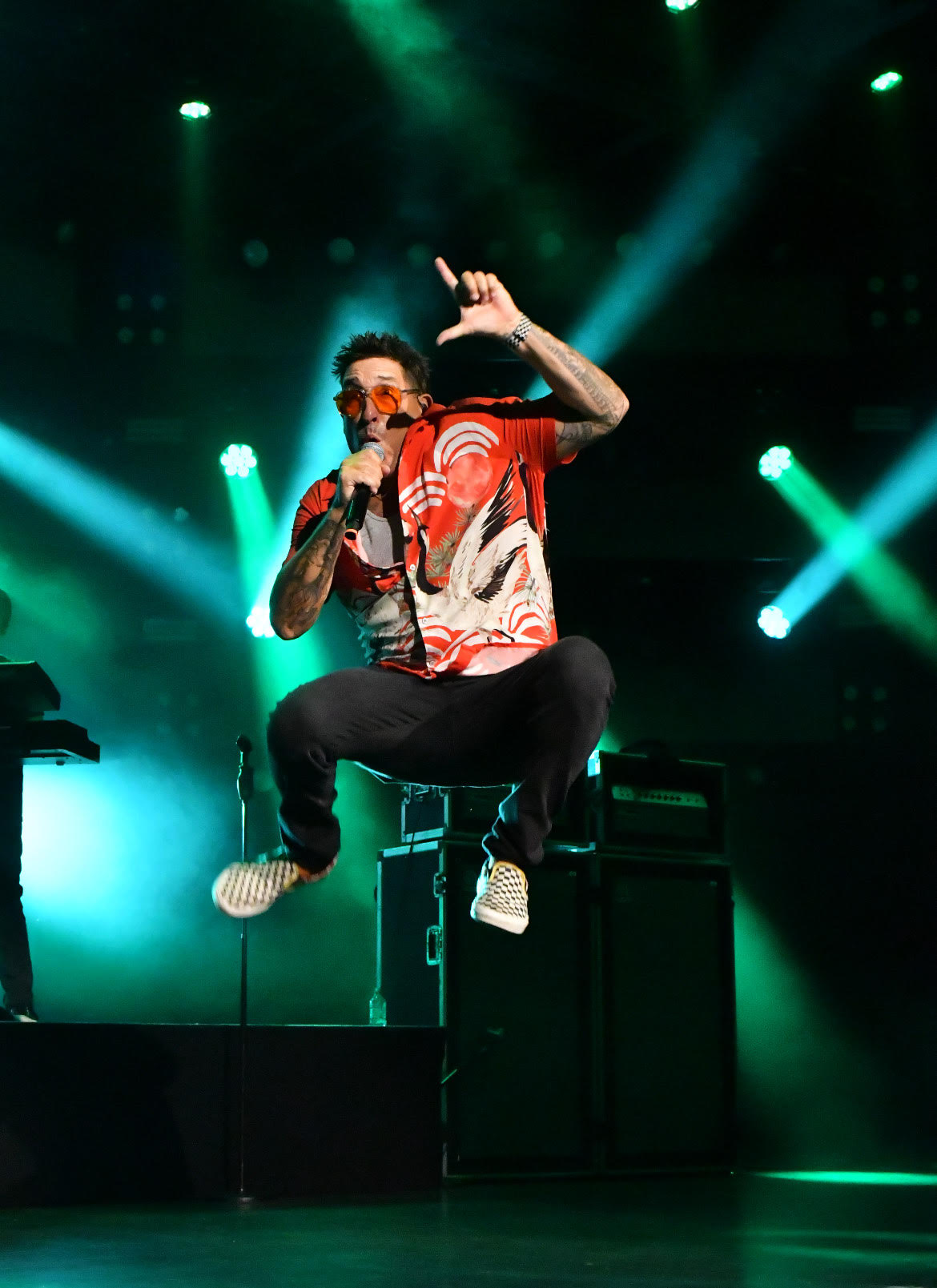
Zach Goode during a show in Orlando, Florida in 2025

On April 12, 2024, Smash Mouth released the single and video "Ride On", and on July 12, the band released a cover of the iconic Brady Bunch song, "Sunshine Day" featuring Greg Brady's actor, Barry Williams. Throughout summer 2024, the band embarked on the Ride On Tour with close to 100 shows, touring everywhere from Alaska to Hawaii with major festival stops in Mexico, Chile, Peru, and Malaysia along the way.

The band joined Cleopatra Records in late 2024, and released a cover of the Beatles' "Love Me Do" in November. On December 4, 2024, the band confirmed a full-length LP under the working title Fush Yu Too was in the works and was to be due by the end of February. Prior to that in March, during the Ride On Tour, the band hinted going back to the studio to record an LP in the same ska style as "Fush Yu Mang". On January 21, 2025, the band released a cover of "Blinding Lights" by the Weeknd, with which the band had received backlash for using AI for the cover art. It was later confirmed that the cover, as well as "Love Me Do", would be included on Cleopatra's compilation album, Punk Rock Valentines, which released on February 7.

On March 3, 2025, the band announced the Mercury Comet Tour. A day later, on March 4, they announced their new LP was titled Mercury Comet and would release in June, before being delayed indefinitely. Much like "Blinding Lights", its initial cover art received backlash for its use of AI. In March 2026, the album was finally announced to be releasing on August 12, 2026. On June 10, 2026, they released "Better Believer" as the lead single for the album.

== Musical style ==
Earlier in their career, Smash Mouth was part of the ska punk scene. After the success of their single, "Walkin' on the Sun", the band began including more elements of psychedelic pop and other retro styles of the 1960s in their compositions. They would ultimately come to be known as a pop rock, power pop and alternative rock band, despite still retaining some elements of their ska and reggae roots.

== Band members ==
Current members

- Paul De Lisle – bass, backing vocals (1994–present), lead vocals (touring 2016, 2026)
- Michael Klooster – keyboards, programming, backing vocals (touring and session 1997–2008; 2008–present)
- Randy Cooke – drums, percussion, backing vocals (2010–2011, 2011–2012, 2013, 2016–2018, 2018–present)
- Sean Hurwitz – guitar, backing vocals (2011–2012, 2012–2016, 2019–present)
- Zach Goode – lead vocals (touring and session 2021–2022; 2022–present)

Touring former members

- Mark Cervantes – percussion, theremin, backing vocals (1999–2008, 2014, 2018)

Touring former substitutes

- Rob Schwartz – guitar, backing vocals (2012)
- Kristian Attard – bass, backing vocals (2017)
- Danny Richardson – guitar (2018)
- Steve Carey – drums, percussion (2020)

Former members

- Steve Harwell – lead vocals, occasional keyboards (1994–2021; died 2023)
- Kevin Coleman – drums, percussion (1994–1999)
- Greg Camp – guitar, backing vocals; occasional keyboards and turntables (1994–2008, 2009–2011, 2018–2019)
- Michael Urbano – drums, percussion (1999, 2000–2006, 2009–2010, 2014, 2018)
- Mitch Marine – drums, percussion (1999–2000, 2006, 2007–2009, 2010)
- Jason Sutter – drums, percussion, backing vocals (2006–2007, 2011, 2013–2016)
- Leroy Miller – guitar, backing vocals (2008–2009)
- Charlie Paxson – drums, percussion, backing vocals (2011, 2012–2013)
- Mike Krompass – guitar, backing vocals, additional keyboards (2012)
- Sam Eigen – guitar, backing vocals (2016–2018)

Touring former guests

- Adam Young – lead vocals, guitar (2011)
- Miles Zuniga – guitar (2013)

Timeline

== Discography ==
- Fush Yu Mang (1997)
- Astro Lounge (1999)
- Smash Mouth (2001)
- Get the Picture? (2003)
- The Gift of Rock (2005)
- Summer Girl (2006)
- Magic (2012)
- Missile Toes (2023)
- Mercury Comet (2026)

== Awards and nominations ==
BMI Pop Awards

Year	Nominee/work	Award	Result	Ref.
2001	"Then the Morning Comes"	Award-Winning Song	Won	

Billboard Music Awards

Year	Nominee/work	Award	Result	Ref.
1998	Smash Mouth	Top Adult Top 40 Artist	Nominated	
1999	"All Star"	Top Hot Top 40 Track	Nominated	
1999	"All Star"	Top Soundtrack Single	Nominated	

Billboard Music Video Awards

Year	Nominee / work	Award	Result	Ref.
1999	"All Star"	Best Pop Clip	Nominated	

Blockbuster Entertainment Awards

Year	Nominee / work	Award	Result	Ref.
2000	Astro Lounge	Favorite Group - Modern Rock	Nominated	

Grammys

Year	Nominee/work	Award	Result
2000	All Star	Best Pop Performance by a Duo or Group with Vocals	Nominated

California Music Awards (Bammie)

Year	Nominee/work	Award	Result
1998	"Walkin' on the Sun"	Best single	Won
2000	Astro Lounge	Outstanding Rock/Pop album	Won
2000	Steve Harwell	Outstanding Male Vocalist	Won

Teen Choice Awards

Year	Nominee/work	Award	Result	Ref.
1999	Smash Mouth	Choice Music Group	Nominated	
1999	Astro Lounge	Choice Music Album	Nominated	
1999	"All Star"	Choice Summer Song	Nominated	
2000	Smash Mouth	Choice Rock Group	Nominated	

Kids Choice Awards

Year	Nominee/work	Award	Result
2000	Smash Mouth	Favorite Band	Won
2000	All Star	Favorite Song	Nominated
2002	Smash Mouth	Favorite Band	Nominated
2002	"I'm a Believer"	Favorite Song	Nominated

Radio Music Awards

Year	Nominee/work	Award	Result
1999	Smash Mouth	Alternative Artist of the Year	Won
2000	Smash Mouth	Artist of the Year (Pop/Alternative Radio)	Nominated
