= Then the Morning Comes =

1999 single by Smash Mouth

Single by Smash Mouth

from the album Astro Lounge
- B-side: "Come On, Come On"; "Radio"
- Released: September 14, 1999
- Length: 3:02
- Label: Interscope
- Songwriters: Greg Camp; Paul Barry
- Producer: Eric Valentine

Smash Mouth singles chronology
"All Star" (1999)	"Then the Morning Comes" (1999)	"Waste" (2000)

Music video
- "Then the Morning Comes" on YouTube

"Then the Morning Comes" is a song by American band Smash Mouth. It was released in September 1999 as the third single from the band's second studio album, Astro Lounge. The song was a successful follow-up to the international hit "All Star" in several nations, peaking at number 11 on the US Billboard Hot 100, number two in Canada, number 17 in Iceland, and number 22 in New Zealand. In 2001 the song won a BMI Pop Award.

== Composition ==
"Then the Morning Comes" is written with the verses and pre-choruses in C minor, the chorus in E♭ major, the bridge in C major, and the break in A minor. The song runs at 116 beats per minute. Like most Smash Mouth songs, the music is played a semitone flat. The song samples the strings refrain from Mantovani's 1967 version of Shirley Bassey's song "Goldfinger", from the James Bond film of the same name.

== Music video ==
The music video was filmed in Santa Cruz, California and was directed by Scott Marshall. In the video, vocalist Steve Harwell keeps having nightmares about seeing a beautiful woman (Stacy Sanches), waking when something embarrassing happens (first a dog urinates on him and the next time he steps in gum) and the woman laughs at him. However, in the last version (in which he is still wearing pyjama pants and slippers), she joins him and he awakens to reveal the two in bed together.

== Charts ==
=== Weekly charts ===
Chart (1999–2000)	Peak position
Canada Top Singles (RPM)	2
Canada Adult Contemporary (RPM)	33
Iceland (Íslenski Listinn Topp 40)	17
New Zealand (Recorded Music NZ)	22
US Billboard Hot 100	11
US Adult Alternative Airplay (Billboard)	12
US Adult Pop Airplay (Billboard)	2
US Alternative Airplay (Billboard)	26
US Pop Airplay (Billboard)	5

=== Year-end charts ===
Chart (1999)	Position
Canada Top Singles (RPM)	88
US Adult Top 40 (Billboard)	88

Chart (2000)	Position
US Billboard Hot 100	48
US Adult Top 40 (Billboard)	3
US Mainstream Top 40 (Billboard)	33

== Release history ==
Region	Date	Format(s)	Label(s)	Ref.
United States	September 14, 1999	Alternative radio	Interscope	
United States	October 4, 1999	Hot adult contemporary; modern adult contemporary radio	Interscope	
United States	October 5, 1999	Contemporary hit radio	Interscope	
New Zealand	December 13, 1999	CD	Interscope	
