= Astro Lounge =

Studio album by Smash Mouth
- Released: June 8, 1999
- Recorded: 1998–1999
- Studios: H.O.S. Recording, Redwood City, California, US
- Genres: Pop rock; post-psychedelia; surf pop
- Length: 50:16
- Label: Interscope
- Producer: Eric Valentine

Smash Mouth chronology
Fush Yu Mang (1997)	Astro Lounge (1999)	Smash Mouth (2001)

Singles from Astro Lounge
- 1. "Can't Get Enough of You Baby" Released: May 11, 1998; 2. "All Star" Released: May 4, 1999; 3. "Then the Morning Comes" Released: September 14, 1999; 4. "Waste" Released: March 7, 2000

Astro Lounge is the second studio album by American rock band Smash Mouth, released on June 8, 1999 by Interscope Records.

The album includes the single "All Star", which reached number four on the US Billboard Hot 100 and is widely considered as the group's signature song. Three other singles were also released from the album, including "Then the Morning Comes", "Waste", and a cover version of The Four Seasons' "Can't Get Enough of You Baby". This is the band’s second and final album to feature their full original lineup as drummer and founding member Kevin Coleman left shortly after the album's release. He was replaced by Michael Urbano.

== Composition ==
Musically, the album has been described as pop rock, post-psychedelia, and surf pop. Astro Lounge saw the band break away from the ska punk genre, that was prominent in Fush Yu Mang, and embrace a more mainstream pop sound.

== Song information ==
=== "All Star" ===
"All Star" was featured in the 1999 superhero comedy film Mystery Men, and it was also the lead single to that film’s soundtrack. The song was heard in the film two times, including at the end credits. Since appearing in Mystery Men, it was later heard in many movies (most notably Shrek), TV shows, commercials, trailers, and network promos, and entered the zeitgeist of pop culture. It was also nominated for a Grammy Award for Best Pop Performance by a Duo or Group with Vocals.

=== "Then the Morning Comes" ===
"Then the Morning Comes" was used in a TV commercial by Nissan. It was Smash Mouth's first single to enter the Billboard charts, reaching number eleven, though it was eclipsed by the success of "All Star" from the same album.

=== "Can't Get Enough of You Baby" ===
Smash Mouth recorded a cover of "Can't Get Enough of You Baby" in 1998 for inclusion in the film Can't Hardly Wait. Their version is reminiscent of Question Mark and the Mysterians 1967 cover version (as well as Question Mark and the Mysterians' 1967 hit, "96 Tears"). It was also released as a single in 1998, and later appeared on Astro Lounge. It was the last song on the album and also the shortest (by one second).

The song was first recorded by The Four Seasons and then The Toys, both in 1966 (though neither band released the song as a single). It was also recorded by The Colourfield in 1985.

In early 2007, Pizza Hut aired a series of commercials featuring "Can't Get Enough of You Baby" in the background.

TNT Networks also used this track for a montage of "classic" movies to be shown, including Pretty Woman.

=== "Diggin' Your Scene" ===
"Diggin' Your Scene" was used in episode 17 of the first season of the television show Alias. Thirty minutes into the flashback episode "Q & A", the song plays over a montage of the protagonist Sydney Bristow performing a series of action stunts and costume changes (while the lyric "every day a new disguise, every night a Halloween" is sung).

=== "Road Man" ===
Afternoon drive personality Kenny Roda uses "Road Man" as a bumper for his radio show, heard in Cleveland, Ohio on ESPN 850 WKNR.

=== "Come On, Come On" ===
"Come On, Come On" was characterized as new wave.

A reviewer for The A.V. Club referred to "Come On, Come On" as "over-the-top pop" in a positive review for Astro Lounge. Martin Huxley of BMI's MusicWorld cited "Come On, Come On" as an example of a song that demonstrates Smash Mouth's "pithy mix of... punk, ska, hip-hop, surf, bubblegum and psychedelic influences."

"Come On, Come On" was featured in a Gap commercial and the films Big Fat Liar, Dude, Where's My Car?, Snow Day, and Deuce Bigalow: Male Gigolo. The song was also used in the episode "Queen Bebe" from the hit television series Kim Possible.

== Reception ==
Professional ratings
Review scores
Source	Rating
AllMusic	4/5 stars
Alternative Press	4/5
Christgau's Consumer Guide	(3-star Honorable Mention)
Entertainment Weekly	B
Los Angeles Times	2.5/4 stars
Q	4/5 stars
Rolling Stone	3/5 stars
The Rolling Stone Album Guide	3/5 stars
Spin	7/10
USA Today	3/4 stars

Astro Lounge has been certified 3× Platinum by the RIAA. Its single, "All Star", peaked at number 4 on the US Billboard Hot 100 in August 1999. Stephen Thomas of AllMusic gave the album a 4/5 stating “Smash Mouth have created an album that is unabashedly fun, catchy, and lightweight, the ideal music for a car radio or a day at the beach.”

The album received generally positive reviews from critics, with some deeming it superior to the band's debut album.

The song All Star was nominated for Best Pop Performance by a Duo or Group with Vocals at the 42nd Annual Grammy Awards. The album won Outstanding Rock/Pop album at the 2000 California Music Awards (Bammies)

== Track listing ==
All tracks are written by Greg Camp, except where noted. All tracks are produced by Eric Valentine.

No.	Title	Writer(s)	Length
1.	"Who's There"		3:33
2.	"Diggin' Your Scene"		3:10
3.	"I Just Wanna See"	Camp; Paul De Lisle	3:45
4.	"Waste"		3:27
5.	"All Star"		3:21
6.	"Satellite"		3:39
7.	"Radio"		3:21
8.	"Stoned"		4:10
9.	"Then the Morning Comes"	Camp; Paul Barry	3:04
10.	"Road Man"		2:31
11.	"Fallen Horses"	Camp; Steve Harwell; De Lisle; Kevin Coleman; Michael Klooster	4:06
12.	"Defeat You"		3:54
13.	"Come On, Come On"	Camp; Harwell	2:33
14.	"Home"		3:12
15.	"Can't Get Enough of You Baby" (the Four Seasons cover)	Sandy Linzer; Denny Randell	2:30

== Personnel ==
All credits for Astro Lounge are adapted from the album's liner notes.

Smash Mouth

- Steve Harwell – lead vocals
- Greg Camp – guitars, vocals
- Paul De Lisle – bass, vocals
- Kevin Coleman – drums

Additional musicians

- Michael Klooster – keyboards
- Mark Camp – sci-fi stylings (turntables, effects)
- John Gove – trombone
- Dana Pfeffer – xylophone
- DJ Homicide – turntables on "Stoned"

Production

- Eric Valentine – production, engineering, mixing; additional keyboards, vibraphone
- Brian "Big Bass" Gardner
- Trevor Adkinson – additional engineering
- Jacquire King – additional editing

== Charts ==
=== Weekly charts ===
Chart (1999)	Peak position
Australian Albums (ARIA)	29
Canadian Albums (Billboard)	12
Dutch Albums (Album Top 100)	82
German Albums (Offizielle Top 100)	69
New Zealand Albums (RMNZ)	19
US Billboard 200	6

=== Year-end charts ===
Chart (1999)	Position
Australian Albums (ARIA)	100
US Billboard 200	34
Chart (2000)	Position
US Billboard 200	55

== Certifications ==
Region	Certification	Certified units/sales
Australia (ARIA)	Gold	35,000^{^}
Canada (Music Canada)	Platinum	100,000^{^}
New Zealand (RMNZ)	Gold	7,500^{^}
United States (RIAA)	3× Platinum	3,000,000^{^}
^{^} Shipments figures based on certification alone.
