= I'm a Believer =

1966 single by The Monkees

- US picture sleeve

Single by the Monkees

from the album More of the Monkees
- B-side: "(I'm Not Your) Steppin' Stone"
- Released: November 1966
- Recorded: October 15 and 22–25, 1966
- Studio: RCA Victor A, B (New York, NY)
- Genre: Pop rock; blue-eyed soul
- Length: 2:47
- Label: Colgems
- Songwriter: Neil Diamond
- Producer: Jeff Barry

The Monkees singles chronology
"Last Train to Clarksville" (1966)	"I'm a Believer" (1966)	"A Little Bit Me, a Little Bit You" (1967)

Official audio
- "I'm a Believer" (2006 Remaster) on YouTube

The Monkees - "I'm a Believer"
16 seconds (of 2:47)

"I'm a Believer" is a song written by Neil Diamond and recorded by the American pop rock band the Monkees in 1966 with the lead vocals by Micky Dolenz. The single, produced by Jeff Barry, hit the number-one spot on the U.S. Billboard Hot 100 chart for the week ending December 31, 1966, and remained there for seven weeks becoming the last number-one hit of 1966 and the biggest-selling single for all of 1967. Billboard ranked the record as the number-five song for 1967.

The song topped the UK Singles Chart for four weeks in January and February 1967. Also, it reached number one in several other countries, including Australia, New Zealand, Canada, and Ireland.

Billboard described the song as "an easy-go dance mover" that "will hit with immediate impact". Cash Box said the single is a "medium-paced rocker [that] is full of the group's top-notch harmonies and is laced with infectious sounds". Record World said it was "sensational".

== History ==
In addition to the Monkees, Diamond also suggested the song to the Fifth Estate, who recorded it as a 1967 album cut to follow up their hit "Ding-Dong! The Witch Is Dead" on their album of the same name.

Diamond recorded his own version of the song for his second album, Just for You, in 1967. This version became a minor chart hit in 1971. A new recording by Diamond, featuring additional lyrics, appears on his 1979 album September Morn. Diamond also performed it in a duet with Linda Ronstadt as part of a medley of his songs on an episode of The Glen Campbell Goodtime Hour in 1970.

=== Charts ===
Neil Diamond

Chart (1971)	Peak position
Canada RPM Adult Contemporary	21
Canada RPM Top Singles	61
Germany	23
Netherlands	29
U.S. Billboard Hot 100	51
U.S. Billboard Adult Contemporary	31
U.S. Cash Box Top 100	52

== Recording ==
Session guitarist Al Gorgoni (who played on "The Sound of Silence" and later on "Brown Eyed Girl") had worked on Diamond's "Cherry, Cherry" and also contributed to "I'm a Believer". Other personnel on the record include Sal DiTroia on electric guitar, Neil Diamond on acoustic guitar, Russ Savakus on bass, George Butcher on electric piano, Stan Free on organ, George Devens on tambourine, and Buddy Saltzman on drums.

The song is listed at number 48 on Billboard's All Time Top 100. In 2021, it was listed at number 341 on Rolling Stone's list of the 500 Greatest Songs of All Time

== Personnel ==
The Monkees

- Micky Dolenz – lead and backing vocals
- Davy Jones and Peter Tork – backing vocals

Additional personnel

- Al Gorgoni, Sal DiTroia – electric guitars
- Neil Diamond – acoustic guitar
- Stan Free – Vox Continental organ
- George Butcher – electric piano
- George Devens – tambourine
- Russ Savakus – bass
- Buddy Saltzman – drums
- Jeff Barry – producer
- Artie Butler – arranger

== Charts ==
=== Weekly charts ===
Chart (1966–1967)	Peak position
Australia (Go-Set)	1
Austria	1
Belgium	1
Canada RPM Top Singles	1
Finland (Soumen Virallinen)	1
Germany	1
Ireland (IRMA)	1
Netherlands (Single Top 100)	1
New Zealand (Listener)	1
Norway	1
South Africa (Springbok)	1
UK (OCC)	1
U.S. Billboard Hot 100	1
U.S. Cash Box Top 100	1

=== Year-end charts ===
Chart (1967)	Rank
Australia	8
Canada	12
South Africa	2
U.S. Billboard Hot 100	5
U.S. Cash Box	8

=== All-time charts ===
Chart (1958–2018)	Position
US Billboard Hot 100	62

== Certifications ==
Region	Certification	Certified units/sales
Netherlands	—	100,000
New Zealand (RMNZ)	2× Platinum	60,000^{‡}
Norway (IFPI Norway)	Silver	25,000
Spain (Promusicae)	Gold	30,000^{‡}
United Kingdom Original release	—	750,000
United Kingdom (BPI) 2005 release	2× Platinum	1,200,000^{‡}
United States (RIAA)	Gold	4,000,000
Summaries
Worldwide	—	10,000,000
^{‡} Sales+streaming figures based on certification alone.

== Smash Mouth version ==
"I'm a Believer"

Single by Smash Mouth

from the album Shrek: Music from the Original Motion Picture and Smash Mouth
- Released: August 13, 2001
- Genre: Pop-punk
- Length: 3:02
- Label: Interscope
- Songwriter: Neil Diamond
- Producer: Eric Valentine

Smash Mouth singles chronology
"Waste" (2000)	"I'm a Believer" (2001)	"Pacific Coast Party" (2001)

Music video
- "I'm a Believer" on YouTube

The American pop rock band Smash Mouth covered the song in 2001 as part of the soundtrack to the movie Shrek, along with their previous Grammy-nominated hit "All Star". The band also released the song on their self-titled album. Eddie Murphy, portraying the character Donkey, also performed a rendition of the song in the film. The song was chosen for its opening line, "I thought love was only true in fairy tales", which matched the fairy tale theme of the film. The Smash Mouth version peaked at number 25 on the Billboard Hot 100 and reached the top 20 in New Zealand and Spain. In Australia, the cover reached number nine on the ARIA Singles Chart.

The band had a second version of the song that was featured on the CD singles for the song. This version was slower and featured an arrangement more different from the original Monkees version. The version has a longer intro and a shorter outro than the soundtrack version. It is in "concert pitch" compared to the soundtrack version which is slightly sharp. The singles refer to this version as the "Album Version" and the soundtrack version as the "Pop Radio Mix" or "Film Version - Radio Edit" depending on the release. This is despite the soundtrack version is also the version that appears on the band's self-titled album. Some modern streaming services retroactively title the version on the self-titled album as "Radio Edit".

=== Music video ===
The music video for Smash Mouth's version was directed by Scott Marshall. It depicts lead vocalist Steve Harwell attempting to return a set of keys to a blond-haired woman.

The video begins with the band performing in a tent; then, the scene switches to them walking out of a movie theater, complete with cardboard advertisements of Shrek and the characters. There, Harwell accidentally bumps into the woman, causing her to walk away without her keys. He tries to catch up with her, but instead finds a man with blond hair. Afterward, the woman walks into a "fairy tale convention" at a hotel. Harwell follows the woman into the hotel. He searches for her in different rooms; however, there are short clips from Shrek behind each door. Finally, he tries one more door and thinks it is the woman. However, a blond-haired chimpanzee is dancing with a woman dressed as a banana. With no luck, Harwell walks out of the hotel, but the woman speeds off in her red convertible.

Hoping to catch up, Harwell sneakily takes a red jacket and borrows a silver Lexus car driven by a costumed gingerbread man who is injured and using crutches. Then, Harwell winks at the camera as the chase begins. While driving, he throws the jacket up and into the street. He then stops at a party where the woman is and goes into a tent (the same one where the band's performance takes place). However, he observes several similar blonde-haired women, all dancing and wearing the same red shirt. Harwell recognizes the woman again and catches up with her just as she boards a boat. He asks the boat captain for assistance, and the band performs on the boat during a heavy storm. Meanwhile, Harwell and the captain search for the woman. Finally, he catches her on a dock and informs her that she forgot her keys. The woman recognizes him as Steve from Smash Mouth and asks for his number. Harwell declines and leaves quickly. The woman chases after him, yelling, "Wait! Please! I love you!"

=== Charts ===
==== Weekly charts ====
Chart (2001)	Peak position
Australia (ARIA)	9
Belgium (Ultratip Bubbling Under Flanders)	14
Canada CHR (Nielsen BDS)	3
Germany (GfK)	94
Ireland (IRMA)	39
Italy (FIMI)	23
Netherlands (Single Top 100)	87
New Zealand (Recorded Music NZ)	12
Spain (Promusicae)	12
US Billboard Hot 100	25
US Adult Pop Airplay (Billboard)	4
US Pop Airplay (Billboard)	15

Chart (2018)	Peak position
Poland Airplay (ZPAV)	75

==== Year-end charts ====
Chart (2001)	Position
Australia (ARIA)	36
Canada Radio (Nielsen BDS)	76
US Adult Top 40 (Billboard)	20

Chart (2002)	Position
US Adult Top 40 (Billboard)	99

=== Certifications ===
Region	Certification	Certified units/sales
Australia (ARIA)	Platinum	70,000^{^}
New Zealand (RMNZ)	Platinum	30,000^{‡}
Spain (Promusicae)	Gold	30,000^{‡}
United Kingdom (BPI)	Gold	400,000^{‡}
^{^} Shipments figures based on certification alone.^{‡} Sales+streaming figures based on certification alone.

=== Release history ===
Region	Date	Format(s)	Label(s)	Ref.
Australia	August 13, 2001	CD	Interscope	
Japan	September 19, 2001	CD	Universal Music Japan	

== Other covers and later uses ==
An Italian cover by Caterina Caselli, "Sono bugiarda" ("I'm a liar"), was released in 1967 on her album Diamoci del tu. It was used in Ridley Scott's 2021 biopic House of Gucci.

British Canterbury scene musician Robert Wyatt issued a cover version of the song as a single on the Virgin label in 1974. The record was produced by Pink Floyd drummer Nick Mason and reached number 29 on the UK Singles Chart. Wyatt performed the song on BBC's Top of the Pops in September of that year.

American experimental rock and new wave band Tin Huey recorded a cover version that was included on the first volume of Just Can't Get Enough: New Wave Hits of the 80's.

The song was also covered by EMF with Reeves and Mortimer (Vic Reeves and Bob Mortimer) in 1995 and reached number three on the UK Singles Chart.

In 1966, Yugoslav rock band Elipse recorded a cover for Television Belgrade show Koncert za ludi mladi svet (Concert for Crazy Young People), making a video at the Belgrade Zoo, performing in front of a cage with monkeys. A year later, the song appeared in the Yugoslav Black Wave film When I Am Dead and Gone directed by Živojin Pavlović. The song appears in the singing competition scene, performed by singer Predrag Jovanović, who would later gain prominence as a member of the German band Jane and Yugoslav band Dʼ Boys.

The song was initially used in the home video version of the Coen brothers' 1984 film Blood Simple, but after licensing issues were settled, it was replaced in the 2001 director's cut of the film by the song used in the theatrical version, Four Tops' "It's the Same Old Song."

American rock band Weezer performed a cover for the 2010 animated film Shrek Forever After. In 2018, Hot Dad performed a cover for Shrek Retold.
