= Steve Harwell =

American musician (1967–2023)

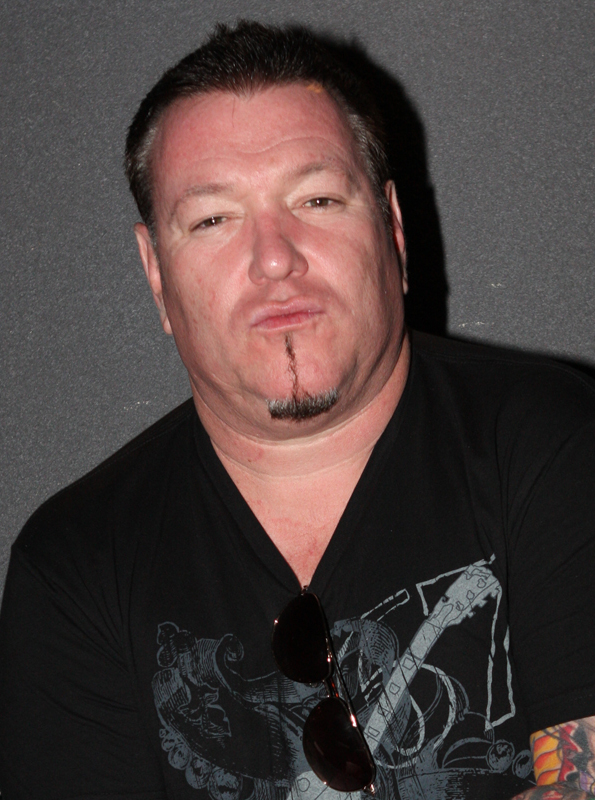
- Harwell in 2013
- Born: Steven Scott Harwell; January 9, 1967; Santa Clara, California, U.S.
- Died: September 4, 2023 (aged 56); Boise, Idaho, U.S.
- Resting place: Los Gatos Memorial Park
- Occupations: Musician; singer
- Years active: 1990–2021
- Spouse: Michelle Laroque (m. 2000; div. 2019)
- Children: 1 (deceased)
- Musical career
- Origin: San Jose, California, U.S.
- Genres: Alternative rock; power pop; pop rock; ska punk
- Instruments: Vocals
- Formerly of: Smash Mouth

Steven Scott Harwell (January 9, 1967 – September 4, 2023) was an American musician and singer. He was the lead vocalist of the rock band Smash Mouth from their formation in 1994 until his retirement in October 2021.

== Early life ==
Harwell was born and raised in Santa Clara, California, and later moved to San Jose. From an early age, Harwell became interested in music when his father would play classics from Elvis Presley and David Lee Roth. During his teens, he formed his first band out of his parents' garage. Harwell was a graduate of Prospect High School In California.

== Career ==
Harwell was initially a rapper in the group F.O.S. (Freedom of Speech). He abandoned the Public Enemy–influenced project upon hearing Dr. Dre's 1992 album The Chronic and realizing that the genre was changing. Harwell was introduced to guitarist Greg Camp and bassist Paul De Lisle. He also met Kevin Coleman who was a percussionist.

Greg Camp formed Smash Mouth in 1994 with Harwell, Kevin Coleman, and Paul De Lisle. They first achieved success with their 1997 song "Walkin' on the Sun". Harwell later reflected on his life during this point stating:

Well, in '97 when "Walkin' on the Sun" went to Number One, that was fucking big. I was 27 years old. I'd fucking never owned a new car, [and] I went and bought a BMW fucking two days after signing a record deal. And paid cash for it. I was living in an apartment with my drummer, eating Taco Bell, and running extension cords over the roof to steal power off my neighbor's house because we couldn't pay our fucking bills. Stealing marijuana plants to pay our bills and pay for studio time. I'd do whatever it took, and that's honestly how it happened.

Harwell and the band's success then skyrocketed with their 1999 album Astro Lounge, which featured the single "All Star", breaking into the top 10 in the United States, and it regained massive popularity after being featured in the 2001 film Shrek. Smash Mouth's popular cover of The Monkees' song "I'm a Believer" off their self-titled album also saw immense popularity. Harwell went on to record four more albums with the band: Get the Picture? (2003), The Gift of Rock (2005), Summer Girl (2006), and Magic in 2012, and toured for decades. Harwell was known for his distinctive singing voice and slightly coarse rhythmic delivery, which helped give Smash Mouth's songs their unique personality. He also worked on his own music as a side project.

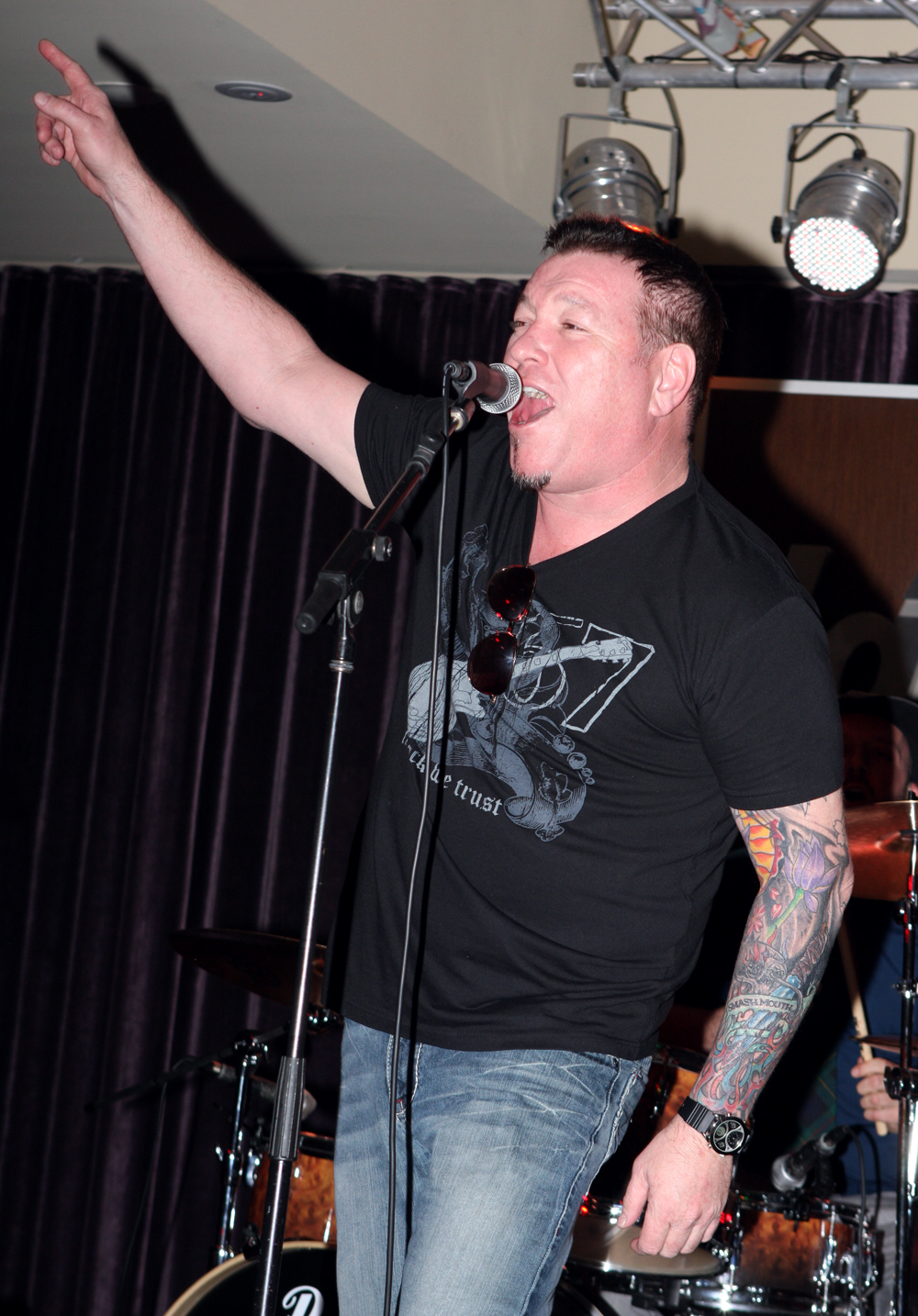
Harwell performing in 2013

Harwell became a prominent figure in online meme culture due to the "All Star" music video and its association to Shrek. When being asked about the subject, Harwell stated: "People ask me all the time, they say, Steve, do you get sick of singing these songs and all that kind of stuff? And I'm like, no. We're proud to have these iconic songs that Greg has written and be able to perform them every night you know, so it feels good."

Harwell was a featured cast member in the sixth season of the VH1 reality show The Surreal Life in 2006. He appeared on other television and radio shows as well as making a cameo in the 2001 film Rat Race. He performed two songs, "Beside Myself" and "Everything Just Crazy", for the 2013 South Korean–Chinese animated film Pororo, The Racing Adventure. In 2018, he provided vocals for two songs in the We Bare Bears episode "Pizza Band".

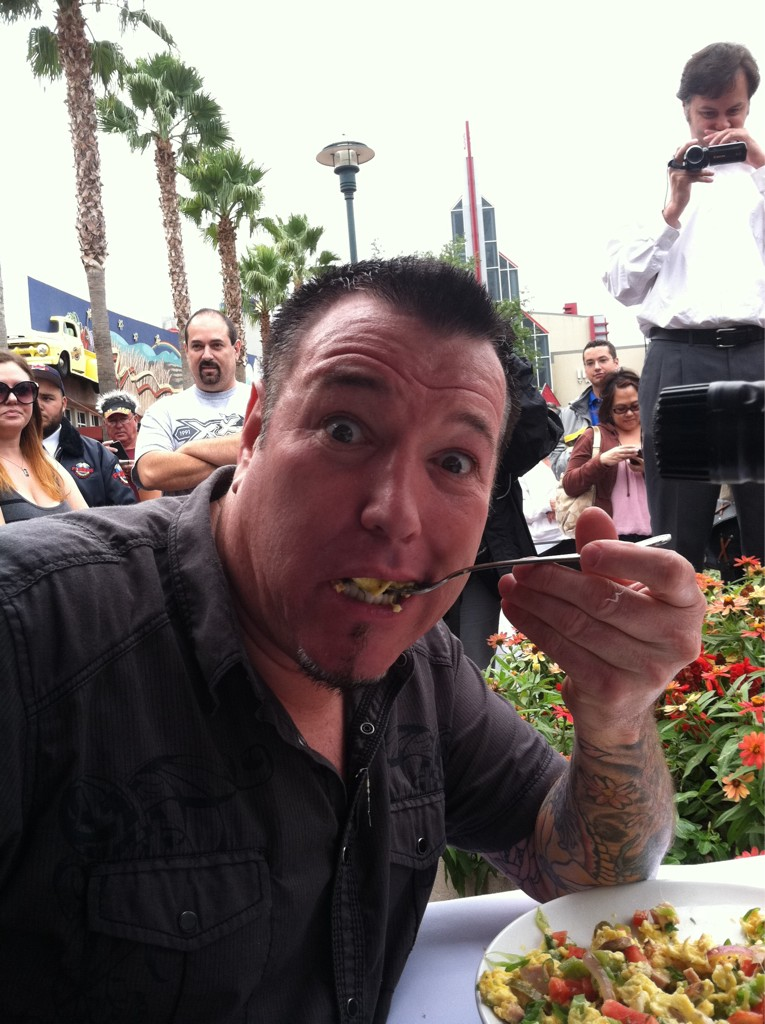
Harwell in 2011 during the egg-eating event

In June 2011, a writer at Something Awful offered $20 if Harwell would eat 24 eggs. Others on Twitter began offering additional sums, eventually targeted to various charities. In July 2011, Harwell accepted the challenge if fans could gather pledges of $10,000 for St. Jude Children's Hospital. The fundraising goal was reached in less than a week. A self-styled "reality TV fan," Harwell requested that his friend celebrity chef Guy Fieri prepare the eggs. The event was held at Johnny Garlic's restaurant, in Dublin, California, on October 11, 2011. With about 150 people attending, Harwell was able to finish the eggs with the help of audience members as well as the San Jose Sharks mascot, Sharkie. $15,000 was raised for charity.

During a Smash Mouth concert in Urbana, Illinois, on August 27, 2016, Harwell collapsed on stage and was taken by ambulance to a hospital. The band completed the show without him, with De Lisle singing in his place. In August 2020, the band headlined at the Sturgis Motorcycle Rally in South Dakota, with Harwell declaring: "Now we're all here together tonight. And we're being human once again. Fuck that COVID shit"; the event was later classed as a superspreading event by the National Institutes of Health.

Harwell's final recording performance came in a collaboration with Timmy Trumpet on the song and music video "Camelot" in May 2021.

In October 2021, the band performed at a beer and wine festival at Bethel Woods Center for the Arts in Bethel, New York. Harwell appeared to be intoxicated, threatening audience members and performing what looked like a Nazi salute. Shortly thereafter, he announced his retirement due to ongoing health issues. Harwell was replaced by Zach Goode.

== Personal life ==
Harwell married Michelle Laroque in 2000; they divorced in 2019. Together, they had a son named Presley, who died aged six months in July 2001 from acute lymphocytic leukemia and inspired the name of his father's disease prevention fund, the Presley Scott Research Foundation for Leukemia.

In 2019, on behalf of his fiancée, Esther Campbell, a restraining order was issued against Harwell.

Harwell was a fan of the Bay Area sports teams. He was also an avid fan of racing/NASCAR and in 2003 he would help start a racing-themed clothing line called "Team Nasty".

== Illness and death ==
Throughout most of his life, Harwell struggled with alcoholism, which was exacerbated by the death of his son. At times, he performed while heavily intoxicated. In 2013, he was diagnosed with cardiomyopathy and Wernicke encephalopathy, which can impair speech and memory. He was hospitalized in 2017 for cardiomyopathy, leading to the cancellation of a show. During an October 2021 show, Harwell said to one fan, "I'll fucking kill your whole family, I swear to God" while slurring his words and swaying back and forth. His actions were recorded and posted as a TikTok video. Harwell retired after that concert, as his health problems hindered his ability to perform.

On September 3, 2023, Harwell entered hospice care due to final‑stage acute liver failure due to years of alcohol abuse. On September 4, he died at the age of 56 at his home in Boise, Idaho, surrounded by family and friends. He was cremated, and his ashes were buried in Los Gatos Memorial Park in San Jose, California.

Following Harwell's death, many members of the music community paid tribute to him, with bands such as Lamb of God, Third Eye Blind, and Wheatus honoring his memory. Celebrities such as Carson Daly and Joey Fatone also put out their own tributes. Chef Guy Fieri commented, "To my brutha Steve, RIP. Today is a sad day. I will miss my friend." Harwell's former band Smash Mouth also put out a statement following his death stating "Steve Harwell was a true American Original. A larger than life character who shot up into the sky like a Roman candle. Steve will be remembered for his unwavering focus and impassioned determination to reach the heights of pop stardom." A public memorial in Harwell's honor was held on October 7, 2023, in Los Gatos.

== Stage presence ==
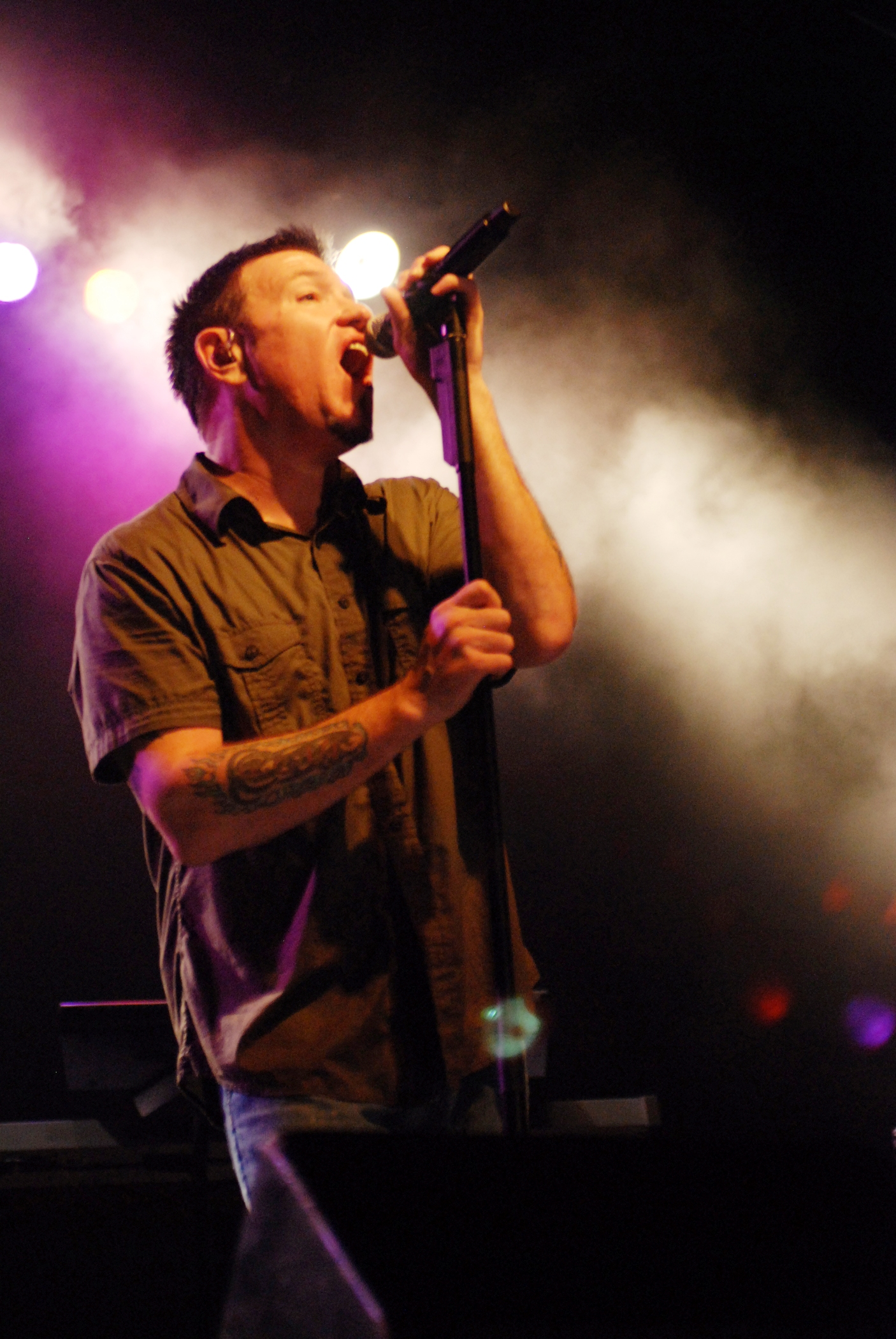
Harwell performing in 2009

Harwell's stage energy could swing from playful to chaotic — which helped make Smash Mouth shows memorable. He often bantered with the audience, cracked jokes between songs, and encouraged fans to sing along. Rolling Stone described him as "a boisterous, crowd-working frontman whose delivery made radio staples like 'All Star' feel even bigger live." Variety added he "embraced the role of rock showman" and delivered performances that were "raucous, unpredictable, and fun-spirited."

In a 2014 interview Harwell stated: "We're not the kind of band that just stands there and plays. I want people up, moving, singing, drinking — having a good time."

== Achievements ==
In 2000, Harwell was nominated for a Grammy for Best Pop Performance by a Duo or Group with Vocals for the song "All Star".

In 1998, the band's song "Walkin' on the Sun" won best single at the California Music Awards. Two years later, in 2000, Harwell won the award for most outstanding male vocalist, and the band's album Astro Lounge also won Outstanding Rock/Pop album. At the 2000 Kids' Choice Awards, the group won the award for best band.

Steve Harwell in 2010

During his tenure with Smash Mouth, the band's debut album Fush Yu Mang has been certified platinum twice, and their sophomore album Astro Lounge has been certified platinum three times. The band's 2001 self-titled album has since been certified gold.

== Discography ==
- Fush Yu Mang (1997)
- Astro Lounge (1999)
- Smash Mouth (2001)
- Get the Picture? (2003)
- The Gift of Rock (2005)
- Summer Girl (2006)
- Magic (2012)

Singles

- Unity" (feat. DMC and Kool Keith) (2018)
- "Bus Stop" (2019)
- "Camelot" (with Timmy Trumpet) (2021)

=== F.O.S ===
- Big Black Boots (1993)

=== Soloist ===
- Steve Harwell of Smash Mouth Rocks the Schoolhouse (2003)
- You'll Never Catch Me (2021)

== Filmography ==
Film

Year	Title	Role	Ref.
2001	Rat Race	Himself (Cameo)	

Television

Year	Title	Role	Ref	Notes
1999	Behind the Music	Himself		1 episode
2003	Kim Possible	Himself (voice)		1 episode
2005	What's New, Scooby-Doo?	Himself (voice)		1 episode
2006	The Surreal Life	Himself		9 episodes
2013	Big Morning Buzz Live	Himself		2 episodes
2017	@midnight	Guest appearance		1 episode
2018	We Bare Bears	Drum Bear (voice)		1 episode
