= Walkin' on the Sun =

1997 single by Smash Mouth

- European single cover

Single by Smash Mouth

from the album Fush Yu Mang
- B-side: "Sorry About Your Penis"; "Dear Inez"; "Push"
- Released: June 30, 1997
- Genre: Psychedelic soul; pop rock; alternative rock; ska; pop-punk
- Length: 3:25
- Label: Interscope
- Songwriters: Greg Camp; Steve Harwell; Paul De Lisle; Kevin Coleman
- Producer: Eric Valentine

Smash Mouth singles chronology
"Walkin' on the Sun" (1997)	"The Fonz" (1997)

Music video
- "Walkin' on the Sun" on YouTube

"Walkin' on the Sun" is a song by American rock band Smash Mouth from their first album, Fush Yu Mang (1997). The band released it as their debut single in June 1997, and it reached No. 1 on the US Billboard Modern Rock Tracks chart and No. 2 on the Billboard Hot 100 Airplay chart. It was also a success abroad, peaking at No. 3 in Canada and Iceland, No. 5 in Italy and Spain, and No. 7 in Australia, where it is certified platinum for shipments exceeding 70,000 units.

== Background ==
Smash Mouth guitarist Greg Camp said about "Walkin' on the Sun":

It was written during the whole Rodney King thing. The song was basically a social and racial battle cry. It was a sort of "Can't we all get along?" song for the time when I wrote it. It was just about all the things that were going on around me as a young person. And I'm, like, God, what is going on? I don't understand why this is happening. It's like we might as well be walking around a planet on fire. And that's how it came about.

Paul De Lisle, the band's bassist, stated the original version of "Walkin' on the Sun" was more of a rap song. The band decided to record the song for Fush Yu Mang after drummer Kevin Coleman discovered a demo on one of Camp's tapes; it was the last song to be added to the album.

The guitar riff present throughout the song has been compared to a riff from "Swan's Splashdown" by Perrey & Kingsley, from their 1966 album The In Sound from Way Out, as well as the Hohner Pianet riff from The Zombies' "She's Not There".

== Critical reception ==
Pan-European magazine Music & Media described it as a "punchy and highly infectious track." They noted that it "deftly fuses punk and ska—and that's a feat which it manages while avoiding sounding stereotypical of either genre." Music Week rated the song five out of five, adding, "This fun-loving US quartet have managed to fuse The Doors with the Stereo MCs to create a deliciously drug-inducing slice of slacker pop. A cracker." A reviewer from NME wrote, "'Walkin' On The Sun' is a classic, straight out of the groovy, secret agent world of Austin Powers. Although it was written in the aftermath of the Rodney King beatings, it has an organ hook that's a deadringer for The Zombies' 'She's Not There' and growling staccato vocal that make it the perfect soundtrack for a strut down Carnaby Street circa 1967." Ian Hyland from Sunday Mirror gave the song nine out of ten. He commented, "It's jingly jangly American guitar music and Radio One are playing it to death. It'll be massive, then they'll disappear."

== Music video ==
The song's accompanying music video, directed by McG, begins with each band member, one at a time, walking down a dark alley. Then, the band performs in a room while scenes of Steve Harwell pushing a remote control makes two girls appear under a glass dome. Afterwards, the band performs on a beach while beachgoers dance around them. The scene then changes to the band performing in front of the two same girls in an area full of flashing bright lights. A drag race is then shown in the street where a yellow hot rod races against an orange hot rod which the band is in. However, in the middle of the race, the orange hot rod implicitly crashes, and the race attendees and female race judge rush over to the scene. The band still performs while lying on the ground despite the crash. The video ends with them leaning close to the camera.

== Track listings ==
Australian and UK CD single
No.	Title	Length
1.	"Walkin' on the Sun"	3:25
2.	"Sorry About Your Penis"	1:23
3.	"Dear Inez"	2:50
4.	"Push"	2:49

UK cassette single and European CD single
No.	Title	Length
1.	"Walkin' on the Sun"	3:25
2.	"Push"	2:49

Japanese EP
No.	Title	Length
1.	"Walkin' on the Sun"
2.	"Sorry About Your Penis"
3.	"Dear Inez"
4.	"Push"
5.	"Walkin' on the Sun" (Love Attack mix)
6.	"Walkin' on the Sun" (Phant 'N' Phunky Sunstroke club)

== Personnel ==
Smash Mouth

- Steve Harwell – lead vocals
- Paul De Lisle – bass, vocals
- Greg Camp – guitar, vocals
- Kevin Coleman – drums, percussion
- Michael Klooster – keyboards, vocals

Additional personnel

- Eric Valentine – production
- John Grove, John Gibson, Lee Harris – horns
- J. Grady, Mark Harwell, Anzimee Camp, Kelly Young, Boston Johnny, Jason Slater, Sam Burbank, Dan Plok – vocals

== Charts ==
=== Weekly charts ===
Chart (1997–1998)	Peak position
Australia (ARIA)	7
Canada Top Singles (RPM)	3
Canada Dance/Urban (RPM)	7
Canada Rock/Alternative (RPM)	1
Europe (Eurochart Hot 100)	66
Germany (GfK)	90
Iceland (Íslenski Listinn Topp 40)	3
Italy (Musica e dischi)	5
Italy Airplay (Music & Media)	4
Netherlands (Single Top 100)	76
New Zealand (Recorded Music NZ)	27
Scottish Singles Sales (Official Charts)	22
Spain (AFYVE)	5
Sweden (Sverigetopplistan)	42
UK Singles (Official Charts)	19
US Radio Songs (Billboard)	2
US Adult Alternative Airplay (Billboard)	6
US Adult Pop Airplay (Billboard)	1
US Alternative Airplay (Billboard)	1
US Mainstream Rock Airplay (Billboard)	13
US Pop Airplay (Billboard)	2

"Walkin' on the Sun 2017"

Chart (2017)	Peak position
US Dance Club Songs (Billboard)	5
US Hot Dance/Electronic Songs (Billboard)	38

=== Year-end charts ===
Chart (1997)	Position
Australia (ARIA)	64
Canada Top Singles (RPM)	37
Canada Rock/Alternative (RPM)	1
US Hot 100 Airplay (Billboard)	49
US Mainstream Rock Tracks (Billboard)	65
US Modern Rock Tracks (Billboard)	4
US Top 40/Mainstream (Billboard)	67

Chart (1998)	Position
Australia (ARIA)	95
Canada Top Singles (RPM)	21
Iceland (Íslenski Listinn Topp 40)	25
US Hot 100 Airplay (Billboard)	9
US Adult Top 40 (Billboard)	7
US Mainstream Rock Tracks (Billboard)	67
US Mainstream Top 40 (Billboard)	9
US Modern Rock Tracks (Billboard)	46
US Triple-A (Billboard)	26

== Certifications ==
Region	Certification	Certified units/sales
Australia (ARIA)	Platinum	70,000^{^}
New Zealand (RMNZ)	Gold	15,000^{‡}
United Kingdom (BPI)	Silver	200,000^{‡}
^{^} Shipments figures based on certification alone.^{‡} Sales+streaming figures based on certification alone.

== Release history ==
Region	Date	Format(s)	Label(s)	Ref(s).
United States	June 30, 1997	Modern rock radio	Interscope	
United States	August 26, 1997	Contemporary hit radio	Interscope	
United Kingdom	October 13, 1997	CD; cassette	Interscope	
Japan	September 23, 1998	CD	Interscope	

== Use in media ==
The song is a playable track in the video game Rock Band 3 and was featured in the television film Shredderman Rules (2007). The television series ER featured the song during the opening scene of Season 4 Episode 13 "Carter's Choice", when Dr. Carter was arriving at work in the snow.

The song was featured in the first episode of the sixth season of the television series The Crown, "Persona Non Grata", during scenes involving Diana and her sons with Dodi on Saint-Tropez.

== See also ==
- List of RPM Rock/Alternative number-one singles (Canada)
- Number one modern rock hits of 1997
