= Greg Camp =

American musician (born 1967)

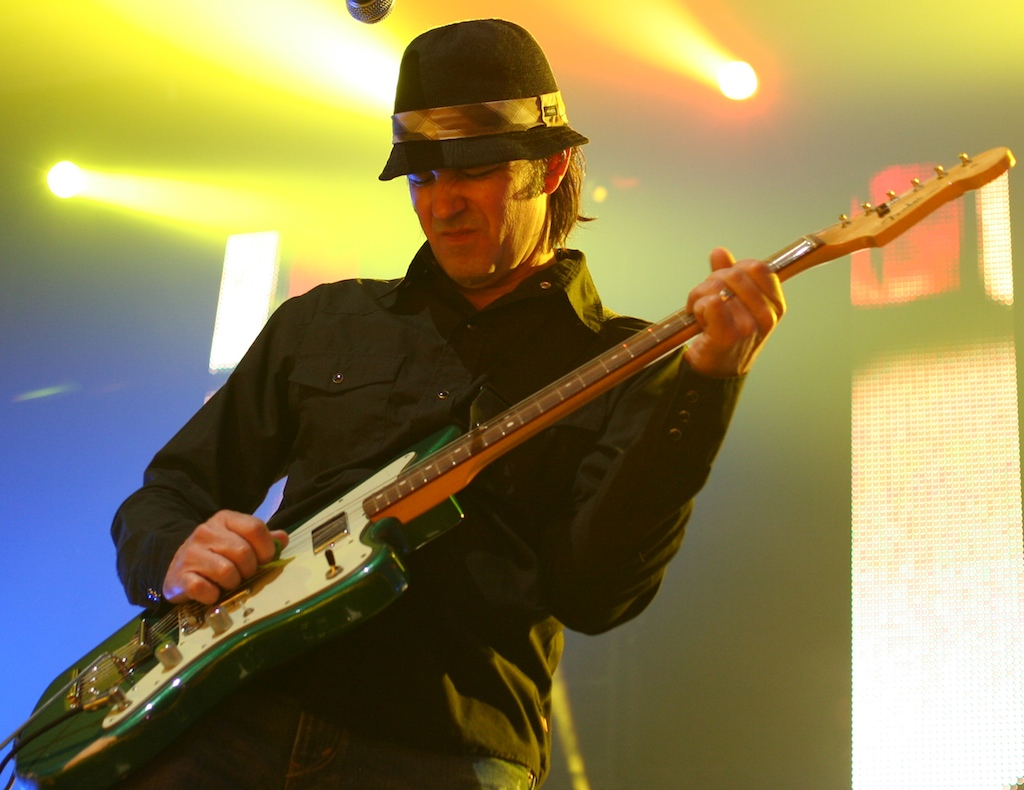
- Camp performing in 2010

Background information
- Born: Gregory Dean Camp; April 2, 1967 (age 59); West Covina, California, U.S.
- Genres: Rock; surf; garage; new wave
- Occupations: Songwriter; musician; producer
- Instruments: Guitar; vocals; keyboards; turntables
- Years active: 1990–present
- Labels: Seavolt Sound; Beautiful Bomb; Interscope; Bar/None Records
- Member of: The Defiant
- Formerly of: Smash Mouth; The Maids of Honor; The Selectrics
- Website: gregcampmusic.com

Gregory Dean Camp (born April 2, 1967) is an American guitarist, songwriter, and vocalist. He is best known as a founding member of the rock band Smash Mouth and served as a guitarist and songwriter across several stints (1994–2008, 2009–2011, 2014, 2018–2019). Camp is credited as one of the main songwriters for the band, and as such received a Grammy nomination for the song "All Star". Since leaving the band for a solo career in 2008, he has rejoined Smash Mouth periodically. Camp is currently a member of The Defiant.

== Biography ==
Camp was born in West Covina, California, but attended Lynbrook High School in San Jose, California. Before Smash Mouth, he had been a musician in the California rock scene since the 1980s. He was part of several bands including the Gents, when Steve Harwell and Kevin Coleman approached him to form a new band. Camp declined, but Harwell and Coleman persisted, until Camp agreed to look at the songs they had written. They formed Smash Mouth soon after.

Camp wrote many of Smash Mouth's most popular songs in the late 1990s and early 2000s, including "Walkin' on the Sun," "All Star," and "Then the Morning Comes". Camp's song "Heave-Ho" was about his experience living in San Jose's St Leo neighborhood. He was the guitarist and backing vocalist from when he co-founded the band in 1994 until he left in summer of 2008, though he has rejoined them periodically.

After leaving Smash Mouth, Camp released a solo album, Defektor, on Bar/None Records. Guitar Player wrote that the album "weaves together everything you love about vintage guitar tones, tortured Farfisa, '60s frat-rock vocal hooks, and epic Morricone-esque soundscapes."

In June 2009, Camp rejoined Smash Mouth for several concerts as a guest. He also played with the Santa Cruz rock band The Maids of Honor and Los Angeles band The Selectrics. Camp currently works as a songwriter and producer in Los Angeles.

In March 2023, it was announced that Camp had co-founded the band The Defiant along with Dicky Barrett of The Mighty Mighty Bosstones and members of The Offspring, Street Dogs and The Briggs. Their debut album was released in October 2023.
