= Home (disambiguation) =

A home is a place of residence.

Home or The Home may also refer to:

== Places ==
- Home, Kansas, U.S.
- Home, Pennsylvania, U.S.
- Home, Washington, U.S.
- Home District, a former district of Upper Canada

== People ==
- Home (surname)
- Clan Home, a Scottish family
- Earl of Home, a Scottish peerage title
- Sam Jones (musician) (1924–1981), American jazz bassist nicknamed "Home"

== Arts, entertainment, and media ==
=== Films ===
==== United States ====
- Home, a 1919 American film directed by Lois Weber
- Home (2008 American film), an American drama film
- Home (2006 film), an American documentary film by Alan Cooke
- Home (2013 film), an American drama film directed by Jono Oliver
- Home, the working title of the 2014 American film At the Devil's Door
- Home (2015 film), an animated film by DreamWorks Animation
- Home (2016 American film), an American horror film
- The Home (2025 film), an American horror film

==== Europe ====
- Home (1915 film), a British silent film featuring A.V. Bramble
- Home (1995 film), a Finnish drama film
- Home, a 1998 Irish short film starring Alan Devine
- Home (2003 film), a UK TV dark comedy
- Home (2008 Swiss film), a Swiss drama film
- Home (2009 film), a French documentary film by Yann Arthus-Bertrand
- Home (2011 film), a Russian drama film
- Home (2016 Belgian film), a Belgian drama film
- Home (2016 British-Kosovan film), a British-Kosovan drama film
- Home (2020 film), a German-French-Dutch drama film
- The Home (2025 Swedish film), a Swedish horror film
- Home (2026 film), a Danish drama film

==== Oceania ====
- Home, the working title of 2009 Australian film Lucky Country (U.S. Dark Frontier)

==== Asia ====
- Home (2012 film), a Thai drama directed by Chookiat Sakveerakul
- Home (2021 film), an Indian drama film
- Home (2023 film), an Israeli drama film

=== Literature ===
- Home (Coben novel), 2016, by Harlan Coben
- Home (Inbari novel), 2009, by Assaf Inbari
- Home (Mirbeau play), 1908, by Octave Mirbeau
- Home (Morrison novel), 2012, by Toni Morrison
- Home (Storey play), 1970, by David Storey
- Home (Williams play), 1979, by Samm-Art Williams
- Home (Robinson novel), 2008, by Marilynne Robinson
- Home: A Memoir of My Early Years, a 2008 book by Julie Andrews
- Home: A Short History of an Idea, a 1986 book by Witold Rybczynski
- Home (magazine), US magazine, 1981–2008
- The Home, Australian magazine, 1920–1942

=== Music ===
==== Groups ====
- Home (American band), a 1990s pop group
- Home (British band), a 1970s rock group

==== Albums ====
- Home (6cyclemind album), 2007
- Home (Angela Aki album) or the title song (see below), 2006
- Home (August Burns Red album), 2010
- Home (Bill Hardman album), 1978
- Home (Billy Strings album) or the title song, 2019
- Home (Blessid Union of Souls album) or the title song, 1995
- Home (Blue October album) or the title song, 2016
- Home (BoDeans album), 1989
- Home (BoyNextDoor album), 2026
- Home (Caspar Brötzmann Massaker album), 1995
- Home (Chris de Burgh album), 2012
- Home (Collabro album), 2017
- Home (Collective Soul album), 2006
- Home (Corrs album), 2005
- Home (David Murray album) or the title song, 1982
- Home (Deep Blue Something album) or the title song, 1994
- Home (Delaney & Bonnie album), 1969
- Home (Dierks Bentley album) or the title song (see below), 2012
- Home (Dixie Chicks album) or the title song, 2002
- Home!, 1970 album by Gary Bartz
- Home?, 2025 album by Wretch 32
- Home (The Gathering album) or the title song, 2006
- Home (Hip Hop Caucus album), 2014
- Home (Home album), by the UK group, 1972
- Home (Hothouse Flowers album) or the title song, 1990
- Home (Hugh Masekela album), 1982
- Home (Josh Rouse album), 2000
- Home (Journey South album), 2007
- Home (Keller Williams album), 2003
- Home (Ken McIntyre album) or the title song, 1975
- Home (Kian Egan album), 2014
- Home (Kingswood album), 2023
- Home (Loretta Lynn album) or the title song (see below), 1975
- Home (Monifah album) or the title song, 2000
- Home (Mr. Children album), 2007
- Home (Nosaj Thing album) or the title song, 2013
- Home (Procol Harum album), 1970
- Home (Rhye album), 2021
- Home (Roy Kim album) or the title song, 2014
- Home (Rudimental album) or the title song, 2013
- Home (Ryan Malcolm album) or the title song, 2003
- Home (Sevendust album) or the title song, 1999
- Home (Sheena Easton album), 1999
- Home (Shirley Murdock album), 2002
- Home (Simply Red album) or the title song, 2003
- Home (Spearhead album) or the title song, 1994
- Home (Stephanie Mills album), 1989
- Home (Steve Swallow album) or the title song, 1980
- Home (Suze DeMarchi album) or the title song, 2015
- Home (Terry Hall album), 1994
- Home (Troy Cassar-Daley album) or the title song, 2012
- Home (Vektroid album), 2013
- Home (Voces8 and Eric Whitacre album) or the title song, 2023
- Home (Wallace Roney album) or the title song, 2012
- Home (Wallis Bird album) or the title song, 2016
- Home (The Wilkinsons album) or the title song, 2007
- Home (soundtrack), from the 2015 film
- Home: My Song Diary, by Priscilla Ahn, 2012
- Home: Songs of Hope & Journey, an Australian various-artists compilation, or the title song by Anthony Callea, 2006
- Home, by Benjamin Biolay and Chiara Mastroianni, 2004
- Home, by Carrie Akre, 2000
- Home, by Emma Steinbakken, 2023
- Home, by Hania Rani, 2020
- Home, by Jane Monheit, 2010
- Home, by Jennifer Brown, 2003
- Home, by John Butler Trio, 2018
- Home, by Kingswood, 2023
- Home, by Magenta, 2006
- Home, by Masayoshi Yamazaki, 1997
- Home, by Nesli, 2004
- Home, by Pat Green, 2015
- Home, by This World Fair, 2003
- Home, Part I, by Scott Matthews, 2014

==== EPs ====
- Home (Miriam Yeung EP), 2010
- Home, by Fools Garden, 2008
- Home, by Gabrielle Aplin, 2012

==== Songs ====
- "Home" (Alan Jackson song), 1989
- "Home" (Angela Aki song), 2005
- "Home" (B'z song), 1998
- "Home" (Basshunter song), 2019
- "Home" (BigXthaPlug song), 2025
- "Home" (Bone Thugs-n-Harmony song), 2003
- "Home" (BTS song), 2019
- "Home" (Daughtry song), 2007, covered by Kian Egan (2014)
- "Home" (Depeche Mode song), 1997
- "Home" (Dierks Bentley song), 2011
- "Home" (Edward Sharpe and the Magnetic Zeros song), 2010
- "Home" (Gabrielle Aplin song), 2013
- "Home" (Goo Goo Dolls song), 2010
- "Home" (Good Neighbours song), 2024
- "Home" (Joe Diffie song), 1990
- "Home" (Kit Chan song), 1998
- "Home" (Kobi Marimi song), represented Israel at Eurovision 2019
- "Home" (La Toya Jackson song), 2003
- "Home" (Leah McFall song), 2014
- "Home" (Lodato song), 2019
- "Home" (Loretta Lynn song), 1975
- "Home" (Love Amongst Ruin song), 2010
- "Home" (Machine Gun Kelly, X Ambassadors and Bebe Rexha song), 2017
- "Home" (Madeon song), 2015
- "Home" (Martin Garrix song), 2019
- "Home" (Metro Boomin, Don Toliver and Lil Uzi Vert song), 2023
- "Home" (Michael Bublé song), 2005, covered by Westlife (2007) and Blake Shelton (2008)
- "Home" (Morgenshtern song), 2021
- "Home" (Naughty Boy song), 2014
- "Home" (Nick Jonas song), from the film Ferdinand, 2017
- "Home" (One Direction song), 2015
- "Home" (Phillip Phillips song), 2012
- "Home" (Rooster song), 2006
- "Home" (Sheryl Crow song), 1996
- "Home" (Three Days Grace song), 2004
- "Home" (Topic song), 2015
- "Home" (The Wiz song), from the musical The Wiz, 1975
- "Home (When Shadows Fall)", written by Harry Clarkson, Geoffrey Clarkson and Peter van Steeden, 1931
- "Home", by Allan Holdsworth from Metal Fatigue, 1985
- "Home", by Alter Bridge from AB III (special edition), 2010
- "Home", by American Authors from Oh, What a Life, 2014
- "Home", by Aurora from All My Demons Greeting Me as a Friend, 2016
- "Home", by Bonnie Raitt from Sweet Forgiveness, 1977
- "Home", by Breaking Benjamin from Saturate, 2002
- "Home", by Bria Valente from the Prince box set Lotusflow3r, 2009
- "Home", by Brian McKnight from Back at One, 1999
- "Home", by Caribou from Suddenly, 2020
- "Home", by Charlie Puth from Whatever's Clever!, 2026
- "Home", by Cheat Codes, 2018
- "Home", by Chris Tomlin from Never Lose Sight, 2016
- "Home", by Client Liaison from Diplomatic Immunity, 2016
- "Home", by Collective Soul from Youth, 2004
- "Home", by David Byrne and Brian Eno from Everything That Happens Will Happen Today, 2008
- "Home", by Didi Conn, Mark Baker, and cast from the film Raggedy Ann & Andy: A Musical Adventure, 1977
- "Home", by Dishwalla from Opaline, 2002
- "Home", by Dolly Parton from Blue Smoke, 2014
- "Home", by Dream Theater from Metropolis Pt. 2: Scenes from a Memory, 1999
- "Home", by Ellie Goulding from Bright Lights, 2010
- "Home", by Foo Fighters from Echoes, Silence, Patience & Grace, 2007
- "Home", by Gemma Hayes from The Hollow of Morning, 2008
- "Home", by Gil Scott-Heron and Jamie xx from We're New Here, 2011
- "Home", by Glockenbach and Tom Walker, 2025
- "Home", by Gnash, 2016
- "Home", by Groove Coverage from 7 Years and 50 Days, 2004
- "Home", by Guy Sebastian from Part 1, 2016
- "Home", by Haim from Barbie the Album, 2023
- "Home", by I Can't Believe It's Not Rock, a project of the Dissociatives, 2000
- "Home", by Iggy Pop from Brick by Brick, 1990
- "Home", by Jack Johnson from En Concert, 2009
- "Home", by Jay Brannan from Goddamned, 2008
- "Home", by Jay Hardway with Firebeatz, 2015
- "Home", by Jenny Morris from Hit & Myth, 2002
- "Home", by Jerry Lee Lewis from Jerry Lee's Greatest!, 1961
- "Home", by Jess Glynne from I Cry When I Laugh, 2015
- "Home", by Jethro Tull from Stormwatch, 1979
- "Home", by Joe Satriani from Joe Satriani, 1995
- "Home", by Joe Walsh and Barnstorm from Barnstorm, 1972
- "Home", by Jorja Smith from Be Right Back, 2021
- "Home", by Katharine McPhee from Katharine McPhee, 2007
- "Home", by Lady Antebellum from Heart Break, 2017
- "Home", by LCD Soundsystem from This Is Happening, 2010
- "Home", by Lene Lovich from Stateless, 1978
- "Home", by Lim Young-woong, 2024
- "Home", by Live from Songs from Black Mountain, 2006
- "Home", by Looner, 2014
- "Home", by Mac Davis from Song Painter, 1970
- "Home", by Mac DeMarco from Guitar, 2025
- "Home", by Marc Broussard from Carencro, 2004
- "Home", by Marshmello from Joytime, 2016
- "Home", by Matt Brouwer from Unlearning, 2005
- "Home", by MAX from Hell's Kitchen Angel, 2016
- "Home", by Midnight Oil from Breathe, 1996
- "Home", by Mike Dimes, 2022
- "Home", by Mitch Zorn, 2024
- "Home", by Morgxn, 2018
- "Home", by Neutral Milk Hotel from Ferris Wheel on Fire, 2011
- "Home", by Nickelback from Feed the Machine, 2017
- "Home", by Nine Inch Nails from With Teeth, 2005
- "Home", by Nmixx from Expérgo, 2023
- "Home", by Ocean Alley, 2022
- "Home", by Osprey V, 2019
- "Home", by Passenger from Young as the Morning, Old as the Sea, 2016
- "Home", by Paul Van Dyk from Seven Ways, 1996
- "Home", by Persephone's Bees from Notes from the Underworld, 2006
- "Home", by Planetshakers from Lets Go, 2015
- "Home", by Public Image Ltd from Album, 1986
- "Home", by Robbie Williams from The Christmas Present, 2019
- "Home", by Roger Miller from Words and Music, 1966
- "Home", by Roger Waters from Radio K.A.O.S., 1987
- "Home", by Safia from Internal, 2016
- "Home", by Sarah McLachlan from Solace, 1991
- "Home", by Seventeen from You Made My Dawn, 2019
- "Home", by Skunkhour, 1999
- "Home", by Smash Mouth from Astro Lounge, 1999
- "Home", by Spencer Sutherland and Victoria Justice from the film Afterlife of the Party, 2021
- "Home", by Staind from Dysfunction, 1999
- "Home", by Sunrise Avenue from Heartbreak Century, 2017
- "Home", by Survivor from Reach, 2006
- "Home", by Swedish House Mafia from Paradise Again, 2022
- "Home", by Teenage Fanclub from Endless Arcade, 2021
- "Home", by Thirteen Senses, 2011
- "Home", by Tim McGraw from Tim McGraw and the Dancehall Doctors, 2002
- "Home", by Toby Fox from Undertale Soundtrack, 2015
- "Home", by Tom Helsen and Geike Arnaert, 2008
- "Home", by Tom Petty from Highway Companion, 2006
- "Home", by Travis from L.A. Times, 2024
- "Home", by Vanessa Carlton from Heroes & Thieves, 2007
- "Home", by Vince Staples from the Spider-Man: Into the Spider-Verse film soundtrack, 2018
- "Home", by Warrant from Rockaholic, 2011
- "Home", by Westlife from Turnaround, 2003
- "Home", by Willow from Empathogen, 2024
- "Home", by Yellow Claw from Los Amsterdam, 2017
- "Home", by Zach Williams from Chain Breaker, 2016
- "Home", by ZZ Ward from Til the Casket Drops, 2012
- "Home" (Bret's Story) and "Home" (C.C.'s Story), by Poison from Hollyweird, 2002
- "Home (Won't Let You Go)", by This Condition, 2009

=== Radio ===
- BBC Home Service, a BBC radio station 1939–1967
- Home Radio, a Philippine radio network operated by Aliw Broadcasting Corporation
- Pennine FM (formerly Home 107.9), a station in Huddersfield, West Yorkshire, England, in the UK

=== Television ===
==== Channels ====
- HGTV (British and Irish TV channel), formerly Home, a UK lifestyle channel
- Hiroshima Home Television, a television station in Hiroshima Prefecture, Japan

==== Series ====
- Home (1954 TV program), a 1954–1957 American lifestyle magazine and talk show television program that aired on NBC
- Home (1988 TV program), a 1988–1994 American talk show that aired on American Broadcasting Company (ABC)
- Home (Australian TV series), a 1983 Australian drama television series that aired on Australian Broadcasting Corporation (ABC)
- Home (British TV series), a 2019 British comedy television series
- Home (2020 TV series), a 2020 American documentary web series
- Home (web series), a 2018 Indian Hindi-language web series
- The Home Show, a 1956–1957 Australian TV show
- Home: Adventures with Tip & Oh, a 2017 animated series on Netflix

==== Episodes ====
- "Home" (Angel), 2003
- "Home" (Ash vs Evil Dead), 2016
- "Home" (Battlestar Galactica), 2005
- "Home" (Boardwalk Empire), 2010
- "Home" (Class of 3000), 2006
- "Home" (Drifters), 2013
- "Home" (Game of Thrones), 2016
- "Home" (Glee), 2010
- "Home" (The Good Wife), 2009
- "Home" (Law & Order: Special Victims Unit), 2004
- "Home" (Lego Ninjago: Masters of Spinjitzu), 2011
- "Home" (Murder Drones), 2023
- "Home" (Once Upon a Time in Wonderland), 2013
- "Home" (The Punisher), 2017
- "Home" (Secret Invasion), 2023
- "Home" (Sons of Anarchy), 2010
- "Home" (Star Trek: Enterprise), 2004
- "Home" (Stargate Atlantis), 2004
- "Home" (Supernatural), 2005
- "Home" (Titans), 2021
- "Home" (The Vampire Diaries), 2014
- "Home" (The Walking Dead), 2013
- "Home" (The X-Files), 1996

=== Other uses in arts, entertainment, and media ===
- Home (video game), 2012 indie horror game
- Home (nightclub chain), two clubs, in Sydney and London, specialising in house music
  - Home (nightclub), the defunct London club

== Computing and technology ==
- Home (Apple), a bundled application within the Apple iOS
- Facebook Home, user interface layer for Android smartphones developed by Facebook
- Google Home (disambiguation), branding for several Google products
- Home button, a user interface element of most web browsers
- Home directory, a file directory on an operating system
- Home key, a key on computer keyboards
- Home page, a page on a website
- Home row, the central row of keys on a keyboard, important in touch typing
- Home signal, a railway signal
- PlayStation Home, a gaming networking service

== Organizations and institutions ==
=== Types of organization or institution ===
- Children's home, or orphanage
- Group home, a structured and supervised residence model that provides assisted living and medical care for those with complex health needs
- Nursing home or care home, a residence facility for people requiring constant care
- Retirement home, a multi-residence facility for elderly people, providing assistance with activities of daily living

=== Particular organizations or institutions ===
- HOME (Manchester), an arts venue in Manchester, England
- Home (restaurant), in Penarth, Vale of Glamorgan, Wales
- Heterosexuals Organized for a Moral Environment, a U.S. anti-gay organization
- HOME Investment Partnerships Program, a U.S. federal assistance program
- Humanitarian Organization for Migration Economics, a social welfare organization in Singapore
- Project H.O.M.E., a non-profit organization

== Sports ==
- Home (sports), the city or field where a team generally plays
- Home plate or home base, the final base in baseball

== Ships ==
- Home (schooner), an American schooner that sank in Lake Michigan in 1858

== See also ==
- Home Again (disambiguation)
- Home Free (disambiguation)
- Home Islands (disambiguation)
- Home Sweet Home (disambiguation)
- Home Township (disambiguation)
- Homes (disambiguation)
- Homing (disambiguation)
- Hume (disambiguation)
- House (disambiguation)
