= Homer (disambiguation) =

Homer is the name given to the purported author of the Ancient Greek poems the Iliad and the Odyssey.

Homer may also refer to:

== Places ==
=== In the United States ===
- Homer, Alaska, a city
- Homer, Georgia, a town
- Homer, Illinois, a village
- Homer, Indiana, an unincorporated community
- Homer, Iowa, an unincorporated community
- Homer, Louisiana, a town
- Homer, Michigan, a village
- Homer, Minnesota, an unincorporated community
- Homer, Nebraska, a village
- Homer, New York, a town
  - Homer (village), New York
- Homer, Ohio, an unincorporated community
- Homer, Union County, Ohio, a ghost town
- Homer, Texas, an unincorporated community
- Homer, Wisconsin, an unincorporated community
- Homer City, Pennsylvania
- Homer Township (disambiguation)

=== In England ===
- Homer, Shropshire, a village

=== In New Zealand ===
- Homer Saddle and Homer Tunnel, in Fiordland

=== In Croatia ===
- Homer, Croatia, a village near Lokve

=== In outer space ===
- Homer (crater), on Mercury

== Sports ==
- Homer (sports slang), a myopic fan or media coverage biased toward the home team
- Home run, an achievement in baseball in which the batter touches all the bases and scores on the same play

== Other uses ==
- Homer Simpson, the main protagonist in the animated television series The Simpsons
- Homer (Ezekiel), a sculpture by Moses Jacob Ezekiel at the University of Virginia, US
- Homer (film), a 1970 drama film
- Homer (name), a list of people and fictional characters with the given name or surname
- Homer (software), an IRC client for Macintosh computers during the 1990s
- Homer (unit), a unit of volume
- Homer (brand), an independent, American, luxury brand, founded in 2018
- Homer College, in Homer, Louisiana
- Homer High School (disambiguation)
- HOMER1, or Homer homolog 1 (Drosophila), a human gene
- Homing beacon (or "homer"), a type of tracking transmitter
- Mil Mi-12, NATO reporting name Homer, a Soviet helicopter
- Prince Homer, a small truck produced by Prince Motor Company and later by Nissan
- Racing Homer, a type of racing pigeon
- SS Homer, a steamer scuttled during the American Civil War
- Homer, the codename for the British spy Donald Maclean

== See also ==
- Homeric (disambiguation)
- Homerus (disambiguation)
- "HOMR", a 2001 episode of The Simpsons
- Omero, the Italian version of the given name Homer
