= Homes (disambiguation) =

Homes are living spaces used as permanent or semi-permanent residences.

Homes or HOMES may also refer to:

== Colloquialisms ==
- HOMES, mnemonic for names of North American Great Lakes
- Project homes, communities built as public housing projects

== People ==
- Homes (surname)
- Christopher Homes, physicist and eponym of Homes's law

== Other uses ==
- Homes.com, real estate portal
- "Homes", an episode of television series Zoboomafoo

== See also ==
- Homes & Gardens magazine, AKA Better Homes and Gardens
- Home (disambiguation)
- Holmes (disambiguation)
- Homing (disambiguation)
