= Lake Lokve =

- Lokvarsko jezero (Croatian)
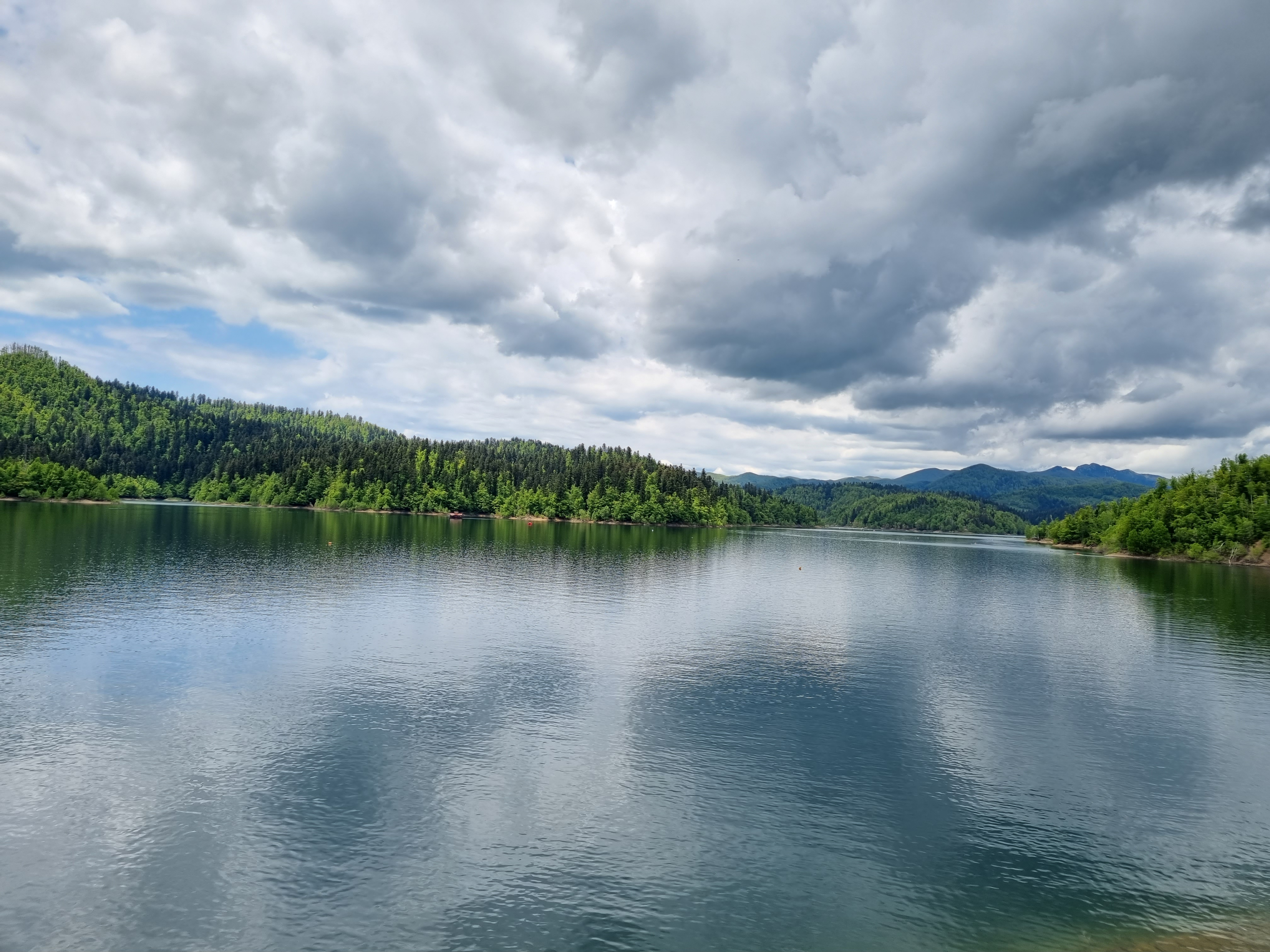
- Lake Lokve view from the dam

- Location within Croatia
- Location: Gorski Kotar, Croatia
- Coordinates: 45°22′N 14°41′E
- Type: lake
- River sources: Lokve River

Lake Lokve or Lokvarsko Lake (Croatian: Lokvarsko jezero) is an artificial lake in northwestern Croatia. It was created by damming the Lokve River in the 1950s.

== Location ==
Lake Lokve is located in the mountainous Gorski Kotar region, about 30km east of the city Rijeka. The lake is bordered by the villages of Homer, Mrzla Vodica, and Zelin Mrzlovodički in the Lokve municipality. The mountains of Risnjak National Park begin just north of the lake.

== See also ==
- List of lakes in Croatia
