= Dave Beer =

British musical artist (born 1965)

- Born: David Michael Beer; 24 January 1965 (age 61); Pontefract, West Yorkshire, England
- Genres: Punk, house, funk, electro, new wave
- Occupations: DJ, record producer, club promoter
- Years active: 1983–present
- Label: Back To Basics Recordings
- Website: www.davebeer.co.uk

David Michael Beer (born 24 January 1965) is an English music mogul who came to notice in the 1990s as the promoter of the UK's longest running club night Back To Basics. In the early days, his passport occupation read "purveyor of good times" and he went on to be nicknamed by music Mixmag as the "King of Clubs". With his Leeds based club night Back To Basics, Beer features as one of the youngest men in Leeds City Museum's exhibition chronicling the popular culture of Leeds.

== Early life ==
Dave Beer was born in Pontefract, West Yorkshire and grew up in a single parent family on a council estate in Pontefract. He attended Carlton High School as a teenager but left at the age of 16 looking for a new challenge.

He found solace in art and went on to study at Wakefield Arts College where he met his best friend and, later, fellow Back To Basics promoter, Alistair Cooke. The pair wanted to make films and be in a band and went on to study multi-media, film and TV at Sheffield University.

As a youth, Beer was a rebellious punk; he dyed his hair red, wore a kilt and listened to punk anthems like "White Riot" and "God Save the Queen". He followed bands like The Clash and The Cure across the country and once got into a gig, climbing in through a dressing room window, too young to get past the bouncers on the door.

== Career ==
=== Roadie and tour manager ===
Beer's obsession with the punk-music scene saw him become a groupie, hitching up with punk band The Clash. As a keen photographer, he captured many exclusive shots of the bands he followed incorporating them into art projects at college. His persistence on the tour circuit led to his first proper role as a roadie and later as tour manager for bands including That Petrol Emotion, Ramones, Ghost Dance, Utah Saints, and The Sisters of Mercy who he lived with at the time.

During a spell with Stourbridge noisemeisters, Pop Will Eat Itself, Beer found himself working on the 1987 Def Jam tour that included Public Enemy, LL Cool J and Run-DMC, but life as a tour manager would soon takes its toll.

Beer travelled the world several times over with numerous bands before he became fed up with life on the road. It was the birth of acid house in 1988 that sent Beer on a new tangent entirely. He visited the Haçienda and the famed illegal warehouse parties in Blackburn getting his first taste of acid house, but when the Criminal Justice Act hit in 1991, outlawing parties in disused libraries and warehouses; Beer drew inspiration in the new music scene that was taking over and wanted to be part of it.

=== Back to Basics promoter ===
Beer faced the post-warehouse party world with the DIY ethos of a punk and Back To Basics was born on 23 November 1991, named literally to represent what the club set out to do.

Beer and Alistair grew tired of the acid house scene and wanted to put on parties> where alternative music to the rave scene was played. Through Back To Basics, they made clubbing fashionable, and throughout the 1990s it was one of the most desirable places to go, causing road blocks in Leeds city centre. At the time, Back to Basics had a strict, sometimes controversial and inconsistent door policy which made it one of the hardest clubs to get into. Beer personally greeted all 80 clubbers on the opening night and those who were refused entry due to their dummy sucking or poor choice of trainers were encouraged to try harder next time.

Its opening night was held on the top floor of The Chocolate Factory, which was later renamed, The Music Factory. Weeks two and three of Back To Basics saw the crowds double in size until it was attracting 1,000 clubbers every week. By Nov 1992 at the end of its first year, Dave and Alistair found themselves on stage at the Royal Albert Hall, looking out to a packed auditorium as they picked up the DMC and Mixmag Award for Best Club.

Over the next 20 years from 1991 to the present day, Beer toured Back To Basics all over the world from Australia to the USA and held club residencies at Home London, and Space Ibiza. He was responsible for nurturing the talent of Daft Punk, Basement Jaxx and Groove Armada giving them some of their first gigs as unknown artists. Beer was also responsible for bringing international talent into the UK for the first time including Danny Tenaglia, Josh Wink and Frankie Knuckles.

Back To Basics holds numerous awards from the music and events industry and has gained worldwide recognition. It is considered a "household name" in UK clubbing and Beer continues to be "the life and soul" of the Basics party.

In 2017, Beer was approached by Leeds City Council to host a special Back To Basics classical event in Leeds' Millennium Square on 27 July, in conjunction with Opera North. The event, named The Symphonic Sounds of Back To Basics was held in celebration of the brands cultural and economical contributions to the city and Beer was also honoured as a son of Leeds. The event that was held annually for three consecutive years saw the likes of Corinne Bailey Rae, Basement Jaxx, Groove Armada, Robert Owens, Adamski, Robin S, Alison Limerick and Saffron from Republica join Beer on stage with Opera North's 50 piece orchestra. The event was covered by several local news channels including BBC Look North and The Yorkshire Evening Post

=== DJ ===
Over the years, Beer has DJ'ed to millions of people all over the world at the Berlin Love Parade alongside Radio 1 DJs Sara Cox and Pete Tong; at Creamfields, Glastonbury, Bestival and at Homelands where in 1999 he was flown in by helicopter to play to 40,000 people. Today he remains resident DJ at Back To Basics.

On the UK club scene, he has been a regular at the Chuff Chuff parties, his own big beat night, Backbeat; Renaissance, Gatecrasher, and at London superclub's Ministry of Sound, The Cross, Turnmills, Heaven, and at The Elbow Rooms in Leeds where he was a resident DJ and musical consultant for several years.

In Ibiza, his first gig was on the sunset strip at Café del Mar, and he has gone on to play at many more clubs on the island including Café Mambo, Manumission, Privilege, Pacha and Space.

=== Producer ===
Beer's career as a music producer began when he teamed up with his Basics' partner Alistair Cooke for their debut single Keep The Faith, which was released under the alias The God Squad in 1993 on Junk Rock Records.

Many releases followed for Beer including I am Miami (You're Looking at Him), produced under the alias Out of Order with Kriss Needs, released in July 1998 on Creation Records offshoot, Eruption Records. It gained interest from the music press including the NME and Muzik Magazine. Featuring the vocals from Stefan Frank and engineered by Dave Hedger, Beer described it as, "Just an off the wall track. I was always into that early electro Hip Hop sound. So it was a chance to get away from house music and mix things up a bit". The music video featured a cameo of one of the biggest producers around at the time, Arthur Baker who drove an open top Cadillac in one of the scenes.

Beer's remixing history includes re-rubs for David Bowie, The Rolling Stones, Afrika Bambaataa and Intastella. Throughout time, his production has been a varied reflection of his diverse musical influences.

=== Musician ===
Further developments in Beer's career have come in the formation of The Blessed – an eclectic live musical collaboration between him and techno producer Gareth Whitehead, head of Bulletdodge Records. The Blessed draws influences from Beer's punk ethos and from a collection of house, funk, new wave and electro. The band – which features guest musicians up to as many as eight musicians on stage at one time including singers, guitarists, percussionists and brass players – debuted at the o2 Academy Leeds on Thursday 1 April 2010 as the support act for Fatboy Slim. With the incorporation of live visuals, the gig showcased young break-dancers connected with the Mums Against Guns campaign. House music producer Robert Owens also played with The Blessed that night.

The name The Blessed derives from the idea that one must count one's blessings in life, and that life is for the living and must be lived to the full by everybody regardless of creed, colour or social status before it is too late. This idealism, regardless of one's relativist position, is the lifeblood of The Blessed's music and is their political message to bring people together.

=== Label boss ===
Beer turned his hand to label management in 1995 and set up Back To Basics Recordings with co-promoter and producer, Ralph Lawson, and Michael Hirst.

The label issued some of the biggest selling compilations of the 1990s including Cut The Crap in 1996 – a three disc box set mixed by Ralph Lawson, Derrick Carter and the only commercially available DJ mix by Andrew Weatherall. It was listed by DJ Magazine at number 38 in a list of 100 Best Dance Compilations Ever, and to this day is still considered to be "the DJs' DJ" compilation.

Published in 2002 as part of the Back To Basics 10 year celebrations, the label released Back To Basics Presents Danny Tenaglia on React Records, the labels' biggest selling compilation of the time.

=== Designer ===
During the 1990s and in light of his expressive fashion sense, Beer launched his own fashion label named Damage. The collection featured men and women's T-shirts made in quality fabrics, all boasting provocative motifs and slogans, which some say pioneered the way for the T-shirt slogan boom that followed in the late nineties.

Fashion title Drapers caught onto the label and featured it as a One To Watch as did men's style magazine GQ. The range was later seen on the backs of celebrities such as Sienna Miller, Jude Law and Lily Allen.

=== Artist ===
==== Back To Basics' flyers ====
Beer has been the creative mind behind the Back To Basics club flyers since the night first began. Over the years, they have featured tongue-in-cheek, controversial imagery, many of which were heavily influenced by the punk explosion of the 1970s. The most famous of all Basics' flyers is a piece of customised iconography of the Sex Pistols God Save The Queen album cover embossed with the Back To Basics punk slogan: Two Steps Further Than Any Other Fucker.

The artist behind the original images, Jamie Reid gave Beer his blessing to adopt his work. He grew a close relationship with Beer and went on to showcase some of his own art at Back To Basics in late 1992. The Back To Basics adaption has gone on to become an iconic example of club art and its culture.

Back To Basics changed the way clubs flyered their nights, adding edge and personality through the use of controversial slogans and random imagery. The Back To Basics' flyers made their way into a number of books including Highflyers – Club Rave Party Art, Fly – The Art of the Club Flyer, Once in a Lifetime – The Crazy Days of Acid House & Afterwards, Jam: Style + Music + Media and Adventures in Wonderland: Decade of Club Culture. The flyers were hung as artwork in Selfridges in London, at the Barbican Art Gallery, and a lot went under the hammer at "Sotheby's".

In 2012, a selection of limited prints based on the flyer artwork were exhibited at the Leeds Art Gallery and at Harvey Nichols in Leeds' city centre.

==== Popular culture ====
Beer has regularly used his influence and the popularity of Back To Basics to get involved in work outside of clubland, giving talks on popular culture to college and university students. At the MiNT Club in Leeds on 16 June 1999, he delivered a speech at an event called Arthrob in conjunction with The Arts Council of England alongside readings from novelist Irvine Welsh, Miranda Sawyer, and Biyi Bandele. Over the years, Beer and Welsh grew close, and Irvine became a regular at Back To Basics, regularly sleeping on Beer's sofa.

Beer also staged a Back To Basics and Northern Talent Production in association with Yorkshire Arts called Millennium or Bust. The night was an audience with Irvine Welsh, Howard Marks, Wayne Hemingway, and Beer himself, held at the Leeds University conference auditorium on 9 December 1999.

Beer also became close friends with author and filmmaker Howard Marks, who DJed at the Back To Basics 20th Birthday in November 2011. More recently, alongside him, Marks has narrated a documentary exploring the life and tales of Back To Basics, titled Tales of Glamour & Excess.

The pair teamed up in the showcase of Howard's life stories – a series of stand-up shows – that included a bizarre PowerPoint presentation featuring demonic images to the backing track of Sympathy for the Devil, remixed by Beer. The event was staged to promote Howard's new book and first fictional tale, which shares its name with The Rolling Stones' song. Marks mentions Beer in his second autobiography Señior Nice.

Furthering his involvement in events outside of clubland, Beer DJ'ed at the Royal Ballet in Covent Garden where he was booked to create a music programme for a pre-choreographed performance. VJ Charles Kriel provided the visuals for this same event.

== Media ==
At the height of Back To Basics' success, the UK media cottoned onto Beer's larger than life personality. His hedonistic tales became regular content in the likes of DJ Mag, NME, The Face and Mixmag, the latter of which included Beer in its Royal Family feature in 1998 – a double page spread profiling the greatest and most influential people in dance music of the time. The feature ran in celebration of the magazine's 200th issue. A few years earlier in 1993, Beer appeared on the cover of NME's November/December issue with the Manic Street Preachers.

=== Television ===
In June 1999, Beer took to the Channel 4 airwaves to take part in Nightlife Legends, a six-part series of late-night chat shows looking at the clubbing scene.

Even the BBC could not ignore the impact that Beer and Back To Basics were having on clubland, and not just in the UK, but on a global scale. On Basics' 18th Birthday in November 2009, BBC Look North headed down to Stinky's Peephouse in Leeds to interview him about the success of his club night. On 1 March that following year, the BBC went into more depth looking at the history of Back To Basics in a documentary featured on Inside Out in which Basics was referred to as a "national treasure" and "the stuff of legends".

Appearances

- Club@vision, ITV (1996-1999)
- Rapture TV ITV and Sky (1997-2007)
- Nightlife Legends, Channel 4. Six part series – late-night chat shows hosted by Amos. (1999)
- Nightlife Legends Ibiza, Channel 4
- MTV
- Ministry of Sound TV (2008)
- IT TV (banned)
- Inside Out, BBC 1 Yorkshire & Lincolnshire (2010)

=== Columnist and broadcaster ===
Throughout 2007 and 2008, Beer was a weekly columnist for the Daily Sport writing about UK club life. He also had his own Back To Basics radio show on Galaxy FM (now Capital) and made regular appearances on Kiss FM London and Kiss FM Leeds.

== Literature ==
Beer's party lifestyle, influence on the music scene and as an iconic figure in Leeds has been well documented throughout music literature. He speaks candidly about his Haçienda days in Superstar DJs Here We Go!, offers opinion to Mick McCann's encyclopedic book of Leeds and its achievements in How Leeds Changed The World, and appears as himself in the music industry fictional tale Kill Your Friends.

In October 2003, a unique biography of Primal Scream was published – The Scream: The Music, Myths and Misbehaviour of Primal Scream written by the band's tour DJ, Kris Needs. In this book, Needs draws comparisons between the bands' front man Bobby Gillespie and Beer. Needs wrote, "Some of my closest friends in the clubbing community are Dave Beer and the city's notorious Back To Basics Crew. If Clubland has a Primal Scream equivalent, it's Dave Beer". At Primal Scream's Screamadelica Live Tour event on 14 March 2011 at the o2 Leeds Academy, Bobby Gillespie dedicated the show to his pal who was there in the crowd.

== Charity work ==
Throughout Beer's life, his social conscience has always played part in the activities he has supported. In March 2002, he orchestrated Back To Basics' involvement in World DJ Day – the largest global fundraising activity the dance music industry had been involved in. A week of activities was held to raise funds for the Nordoff-Robbins Music Therapy charity for needy children across the world. He held an event with DJ Jo Mills on 9 March 2002 to raise money for the charity.

Also in March 2002, Beer threw his weight behind the Greenpeace Ancient Forest Campaign. The Save or Delete initiative invited clubbers to show their concern about the destruction of the world's oldest forests by filling in vote-cards handed out at clubs across the UK. On 23 March as part of this weekend of conscious clubbing, he turned Back To Basics into a polling booth in support of the campaign.

He continues his charity work lending his support to Strummerville – a charity set up by the family and friends of Joe Strummer in the year after his death; giving support to aspiring musicians and aid to projects that help change the world through music.

He also took part in a sky dive to raise money for child disability charity PhysCap, with his friend Adam Warner who suffers with cerebral palsy. Adam is a regular attendee at Back To Basics.

== Personal life ==
On 12 March 1993, an accident nearly took Beer's life. Whilst travelling to a Basics gig in Glasgow, he was involved in a road collision with an articulated lorry on the A66 outside Carlisle where his best friend and fellow Basics promoter Alistair Cooke was killed.

Almost two decades on, he had another near-death experience, one which served as something of an epiphany when he contracted pneumonia.

He is set to release his debut album under his own name, following a significant personal journey. In November 2024, Beer underwent surgery to remove a 4.5cm tumor, an experience that led him to profound reflection. This period of introspection also saw him convert to Buddhism, influenced by his connection to the Kadampa Meditation Centre, which now occupies the former venue of his club, Rehab. Reflecting on his experiences, Beer acknowledges a newfound appreciation for life and the serendipitous events that have shaped his path.

== Awards ==
- 1985 Gold Disc Award – The Sisters of Mercy First, Last & Always in recognition for sales in excess of 100k
- 9 Nov 1992 DMC / Mixmag Best Club presented by Technics. Broadcast live on MTV
- 1992 DJ Magazine Top Club in the Country
- 1994 Silver Disc Award – Presented to Beer from Moodswings & all at ETC
- 1998 Ericsson Muzik Magazine Dance Awards Best Small Club of the Year voted for by readers.
- 2002 Leeds Bar & Club Awards Best Club Night
- 2007 DJ Magazine Best of British Awards Best British Club (small)
- 2007 Leeds Bar & Club Awards Lifetime Contribution
- 2011 Leeds Bar & Club Awards Lifetime Achievement

== Discography ==
- Moodswings feat Chrissie Hynde Spiritual High (State of Independence) Arista/Brutal [Back To Basics Remix] 1992/3
- The God Squad – A1 Keep The Faith (samples Children of the Revolution), A2 Beans (samples Phantom by Sisters of Mercy), B1 Floored (samples Floorshow by Sisters of Mercy) [Junk Rock Records] 1993
- The Back in Time EP by Mad Indiakinda [Dave Beer Remix] (Time Recordings) 1993
- Out of Order I Am Miami [Eruption] 1998
- DIY In Communicado [DIY]
- David Bowie Night Moves [Dave Beer Remix]
- Interstellar [Dave Beer Remix]
- Community [Dave Beer Remix]
- Glass of Beer featuring The Glass Disasters at Work Human Touch
- Afrika Bambaataa & Soulsonic Force Plant Rock [Back to Basics remix] 1998
- Back to Basics DJ Mag Compilation CD Mixed by Dave Beer & Ralph Lawson 2002
- Moscow & The Blessed Deep Heat [The Blessed Remix] (Loeb) 2010
- The Blessed Love Is Everywhere (Soulman Music) 2010
- The Rolling Stones Featuring Howard Marks Sympathy for the Devil [Dave Beer Remix]
- The Blessed Discourse of Loving Kindness (Soulman Music) 2012
- The Blessed Come Together (DJs 4 Climate Action) 2019
- The God Squad Keep The Faith (Sound Metaphors) 2020
