= Sleme =

Sleme may refer to:

- Sleme, Lokve, a village in Croatia
- Sleme, Bloke, a village in Slovenia
- Sleme Skradsko, a village near Skrad, Croatia

== See also ==
- Sljeme (disambiguation)
