= Successive approximation =

Methods of successive approximation are a category of strategies in pure and applied mathematics.

Successive approximation also may refer to:

- Successive approximation ADC, analog-to-digital-conversion method appropriate for signal processing
- Shaping, behaviorist-psychology strategy of conditioning subtle behaviors only after conditioning gross behaviors

== See also ==
- Homing (disambiguation), e.g. homing in on a goal
- Honing (disambiguation), e.g. honing down a cutting tool
