= Lazec =

Lazec may refer to:

- Lazec, Cerkno, a village in Slovenia
- Lazec, Loški Potok, a village in Slovenia
- Lazec Lokvarski, a village near Lokve, Croatia
- Lazec, a meadow in the Risnjak National Park in Croatia
- Lažec, a village in North Macedonia

== See also ==
- Lazac
