= Home Township, Michigan =

Home Township is the name of two places in the U.S. state of Michigan:

- Home Township, Montcalm County, Michigan
- Home Township, Newaygo County, Michigan

== See also ==
- Homer Township, Michigan (disambiguation)
- Home Township (disambiguation)
- Homestead Township, Michigan
