= Home Island (disambiguation) =

Home Island may refer to:

- Home Island, one of the Cocos (Keeling) Islands in the Indian Ocean
- Home Island (Newfoundland and Labrador), an island off the northeastern shore of Newfoundland and Labrador, south of Cape Chidley, Killiniq Island
- Home Island (Palmyra), group of islets on Palmyra Atoll in the Pacific Ocean
- Home Island (Iceland), the main island of Vestmannaeyjar

== See also ==
- Home Islands (disambiguation)
