= Homer Township, Michigan =

Homer Township is the name of some places in the U.S. state of Michigan:

- Homer Township, Calhoun County, Michigan
- Homer Township, Midland County, Michigan

== See also ==
- Home Township, Michigan (disambiguation)
- Homestead Township, Michigan
- Homer Township (disambiguation)
