= Grains of Sand =

Grains of Sand may refer to:

- Grains of Sand (album), by rock band The Mission
- The Grains of Sand, American 1960s rock band
- "Grains of Sand", an episode of The Dead Zone TV series

== See also ==
- Sand, a granular material
- Grain of Sand, a fictional film within the 2007 film I'm Not There
- "Grain of Sand", a song by Lim Young-woong
