= Lazac =

Lazac may refer to:

- Lazac, Serbia, a village near Kraljevo
- Lazac, a meadow in the Risnjak National Park in Croatia
- Lazac Lokvarski, a village near Lokve, Croatia

== See also ==
- Lazec (disambiguation)
