= Benjamin Rivers =

Canadian independent game developer

Benjamin Rivers is an independent game developer, illustrator, and comic artist.

== Biography ==
Rivers was raised in Barry's Bay, Ontario, Canada and is now based out of Toronto, Ontario, Canada. He is a member of the Hand Eye Society and a graduate of the Artsy Games Incubator program. Rivers has been an active and early member of the Toronto independent gaming scene and has been creating games for download and display since 2008.

His games span multiple genres but often focus on similar visual styles. The various titles have appeared in Edge magazine, Game Developers Magazine and on Gamasutra, GameSetWatch, Destructoid, Maisonneuve, among others.

Destructoid called one of Rivers' games, Snow, "an American Splendor comic delivered by way of Monkey Island."

His graphic novel Snow is being made into a feature film by Ryan Couldrey. The film stars Nina Iordanova as Dana and is set for a release in October 2014. The film will be free to watch, but there will also be a paid version with bonus content. For the first 90 days of Snow's release, 100% of the proceeds from each purchase will go toward the Princess Margaret Cancer Centre, which serves as the premier cancer research institute and hospital in Canada.

== Bibliography ==
Comic Books & Graphic Novels

All self-published

- 2004. Empty Words #1
- 2006. Empty Words #2
- 2007. Empty Words #3
- 2007. Empty Words #4
- 2008. Empty Words, the complete series
- 2008. Snow #1
- 2009. Snow #2
- 2010. Snow #3
- 2010. The Husbanders
- 2011. Snow #4
- 2011. Snow, the complete series

Games

- 2008. Snow the Game
- 2009. The Ascent
- 2010. Drunken Rampage
- 2010. Missing
- 2012. Home
- 2015. Alone with You
- 2019. Worse Than Death
- 2024. Neo Harbor Rescue Squad
