= Mrzla Vodica =

- Village
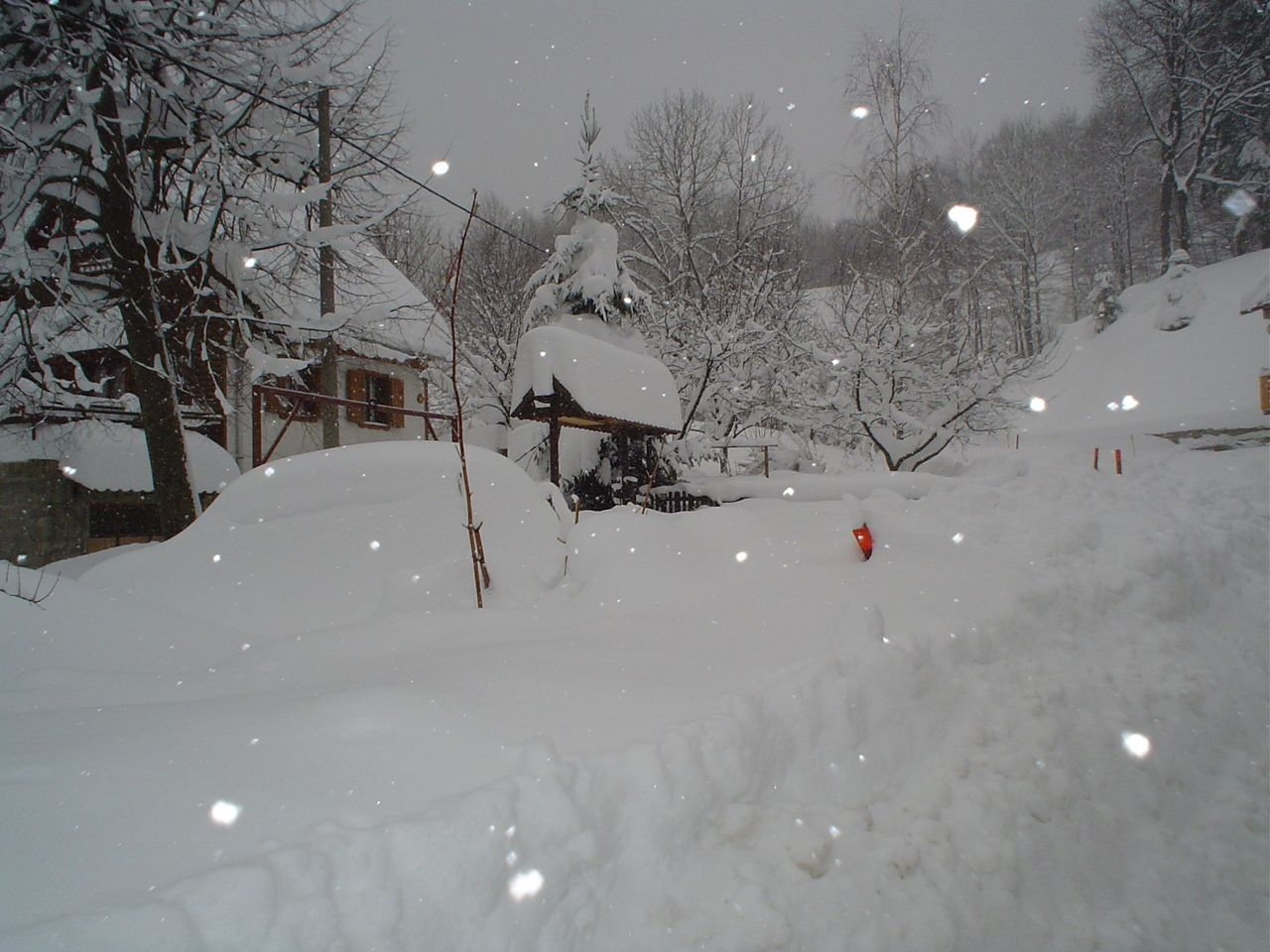
- Near Lake Lokve

- Location within Croatia
- Coordinates: 45.371624°N 14.66888°E
- Country: Croatia
- County: Primorje-Gorski Kotar County
- City: Lokve

Area
  - Total: 17.4 km^{2} (6.7 sq mi)

Population (2021)
  - Total: 14
  - Density: 0.80/km^{2} (2.1/sq mi)
- Time zone: UTC+1 (CET)
  - Summer (DST): UTC+2 (CEST)

Mrzla Vodica is a village in Croatia, in the Lokve municipality, in Primorje-Gorski Kotar County. It is near Lake Lokve.

== History ==
In 1860–1879, Matija Mažuranić wrote a 62 folio manuscript today titled Writings on the Building of Roads in Gorski Kotar and Lika (Croatian: Spisi o gradnji cesta u Gorskom Kotaru i Lici), today with signature HR-ZaNSK R 6424. A 21 folio manuscript dated 1872 titled Darstellung der Entstehung des Baues ... der Luisenstrasse together with a translation by I. Mikloušić is kept as HR-ZaNSK R 4572.

After the Lujzijana was built, the Družtvo lujzinske ceste constructed a building in Mrzla Vodica together with stables. In 1874, the society would sell all its assets along the road, including those in Mrzla Vodica.

=== Kingdom of Yugoslavia ===
A 22 December 1939 decision as part of agrarian reforms by Ban Šubašić to confiscate the local forest property of the Thurn and Taxis family, Kálmán Ghyczy and Nikola Petrović resulted in a legal dispute known as the Thurn and Taxis Affair, in part because of the relative status of the family and in part because of the proximity to the Italian border.

=== Recent ===
In October 2012, the HGSS had to rescue a mushroom hunter in Mrzla Vodica.

On 12 December 2017, a severe wind hit the area, blocking traffic along the Ž5032 road.

On 26 March 2022 at 12:18 the ŽVOC Rijeka received a call about a wildfire in the area. It was localised by 14:30 and put out at 17:40 by JVP Delnice, DVD Delnice, DVD Lokve and DVD Crni Lug.

== Demographics ==
Village of Mrzla Vodica: Population trends 1857–2021
v

population	435	402	423	430	397	429	550	486	379	344	239	107	38	16	11	16	14
	1857	1869	1880	1890	1900	1910	1921	1931	1948	1953	1961	1971	1981	1991	2001	2011	2021

Sources: Croatian Bureau of Statistics publications

== Sports ==
=== Cycling ===
Beginning in 2013, the 7 stage 260 kilometres (160 mi) long Cycling Trail of Gorski Kotar (Croatian: Goranska biciklistička transverzala) passes through Mrzla Vodica.

The "Gorski Kotar Bike Tour", held annually since 2012, sometimes goes through Mrzla Vodica, such as in the first leg for 2022 and the second leg for 2023.

=== Mountaineering ===
The local HPS chapter was called HPD "Gorštak", but although it carried out 4 expeditions in 1936, the decision was made to liquidate it in 1937 under its last president, Nikola Zdanovsky. It was finally liquidated on 20 January 1939.

== Infrastructure ==
=== Agriculture ===
The livestock office of Delnice srez was in Mrzla Vodica, being on the Lujzijana.

== Gallery ==
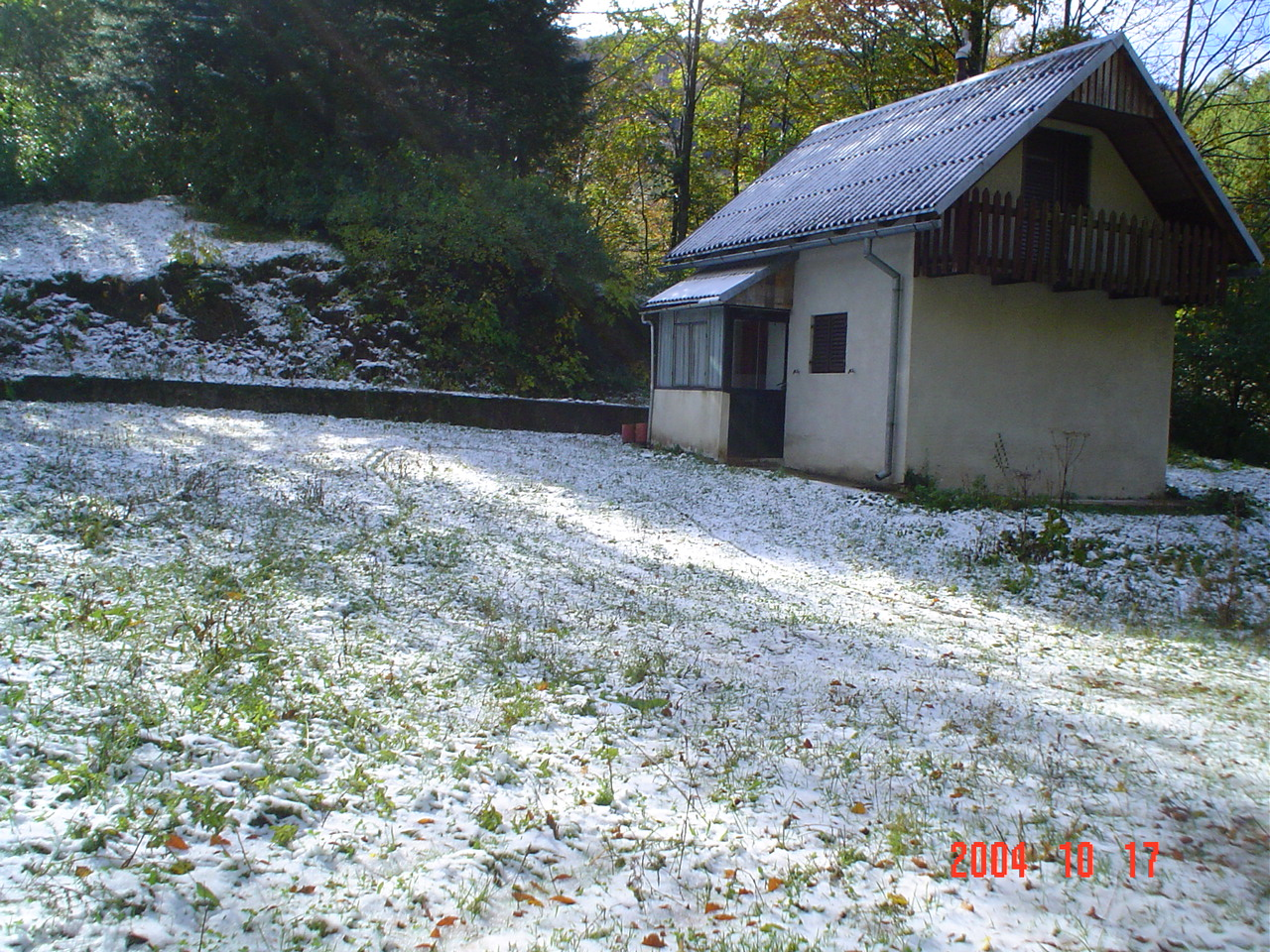
Typical modern building

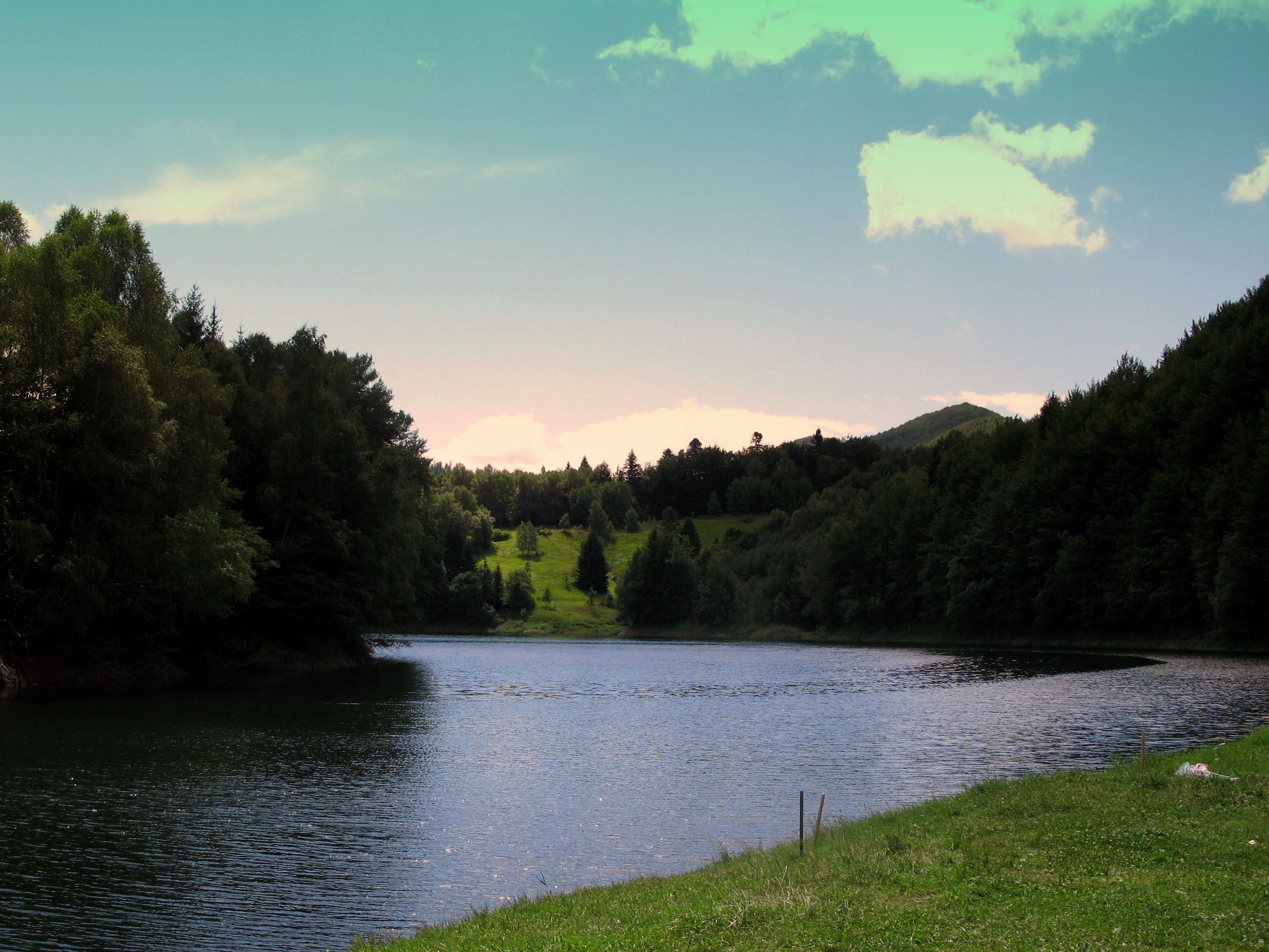
Risnjak from Mrzla Vodica

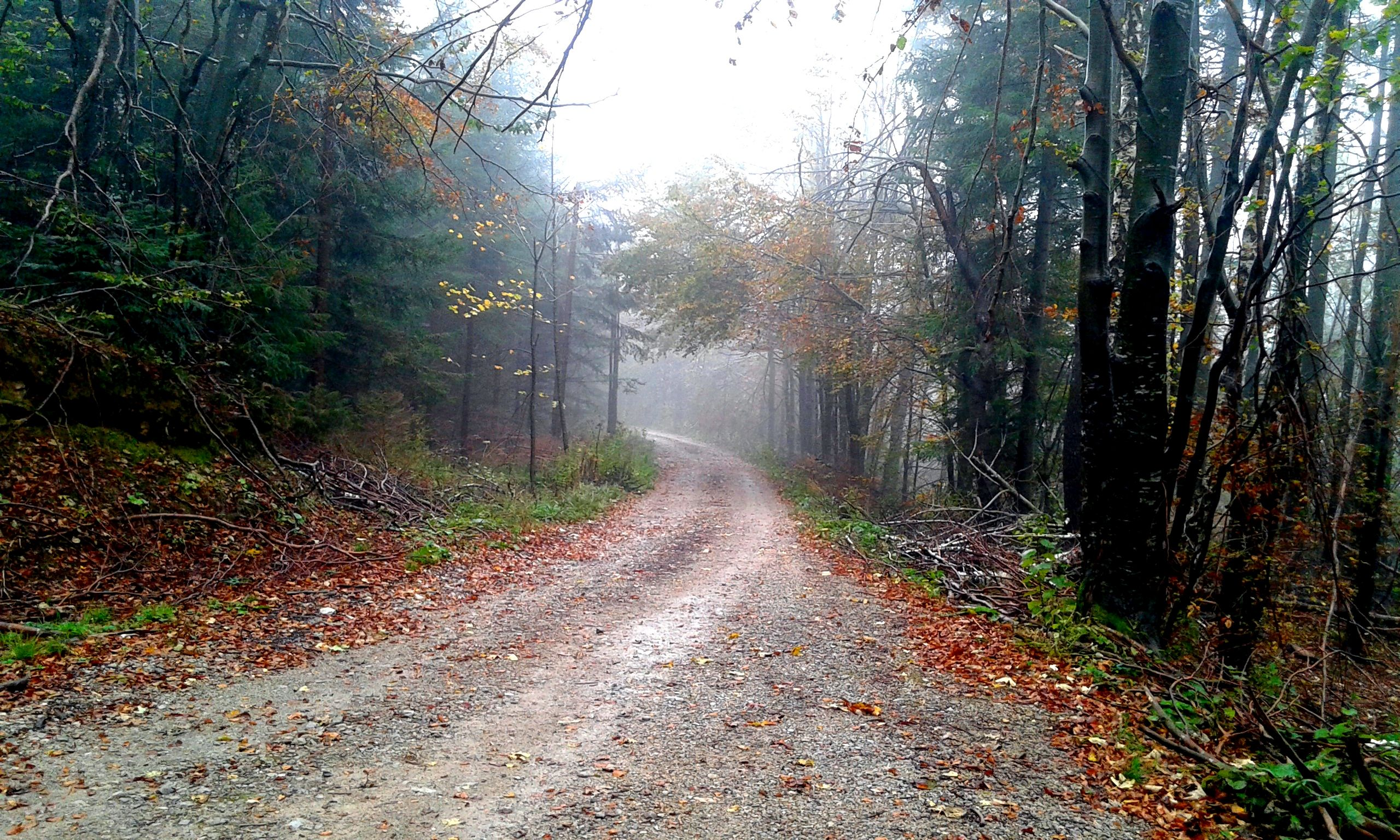
Gravel road near Mrzla Vodica

== Bibliography ==
=== General ===
- Hirc, Dragutin (1898) [written 1898-02-08]. "Risnjak i Mrzla vodica". Gorski kotar: slike, opisi i putopisi. Illustrated by Václav Lev Anderle. Zagreb: 🖶 Lavoslav Hartman (Kugli i Deutsch). pp. 30–48. Republished as Hirc, Dragutin (1993) [written 1898-02-08]. "Risnjak i Mrzla vodica". Gorski kotar: slike, opisi i putopisi. Illustrated by Václav Lev Anderle. Rijeka: 🖶 Tiskara Rijeka. pp. 30–48. ISBN 953-158-004-9.

=== History ===
- Prusac, Stjepan (2023-09-26) [defended 2023-09-25]. Posjedi obitelji Thurn Taxis nakon 1918. godine [Thurn Taxis Estates in Croatia after First World War] (Thesis) (in Croatian). Zagreb: Filozofski fakultet Sveučilišta u Zagrebu.
- Banska vlast Banovine Hrvatske (1940e). "Srezovi". Godišnjak banske vlasti Banovine Hrvatske (in Croatian). Vol. 1. pp. 330–337.
- Banska vlast Banovine Hrvatske (1940b). "Gospodarska prosvjeta i banovinska dobra". Godišnjak banske vlasti Banovine Hrvatske. Vol. 1. pp. 89–96.
