= Cheesefoot Head =

Natural amphitheatre in England

Coordinates: 51.050°N 1.249°W

- Site of Special Scientific Interest
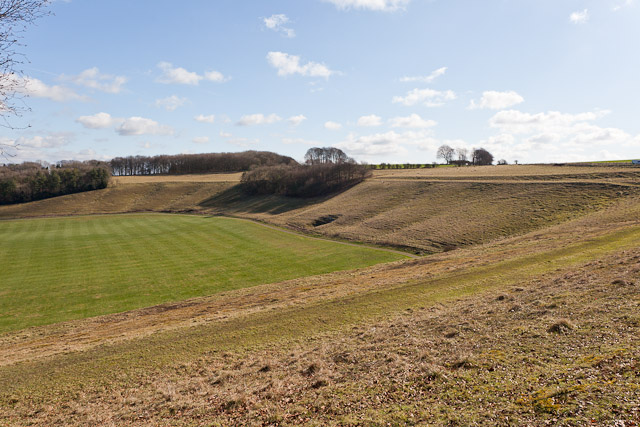
- Location of Cheesefoot Head.
- Area of search: Hampshire
- Grid reference: SU 528 281
- Interest: Biological
- Area: 13.4 hectares (33 acres)
- Notification date: 1986
- Location map: Magic Map

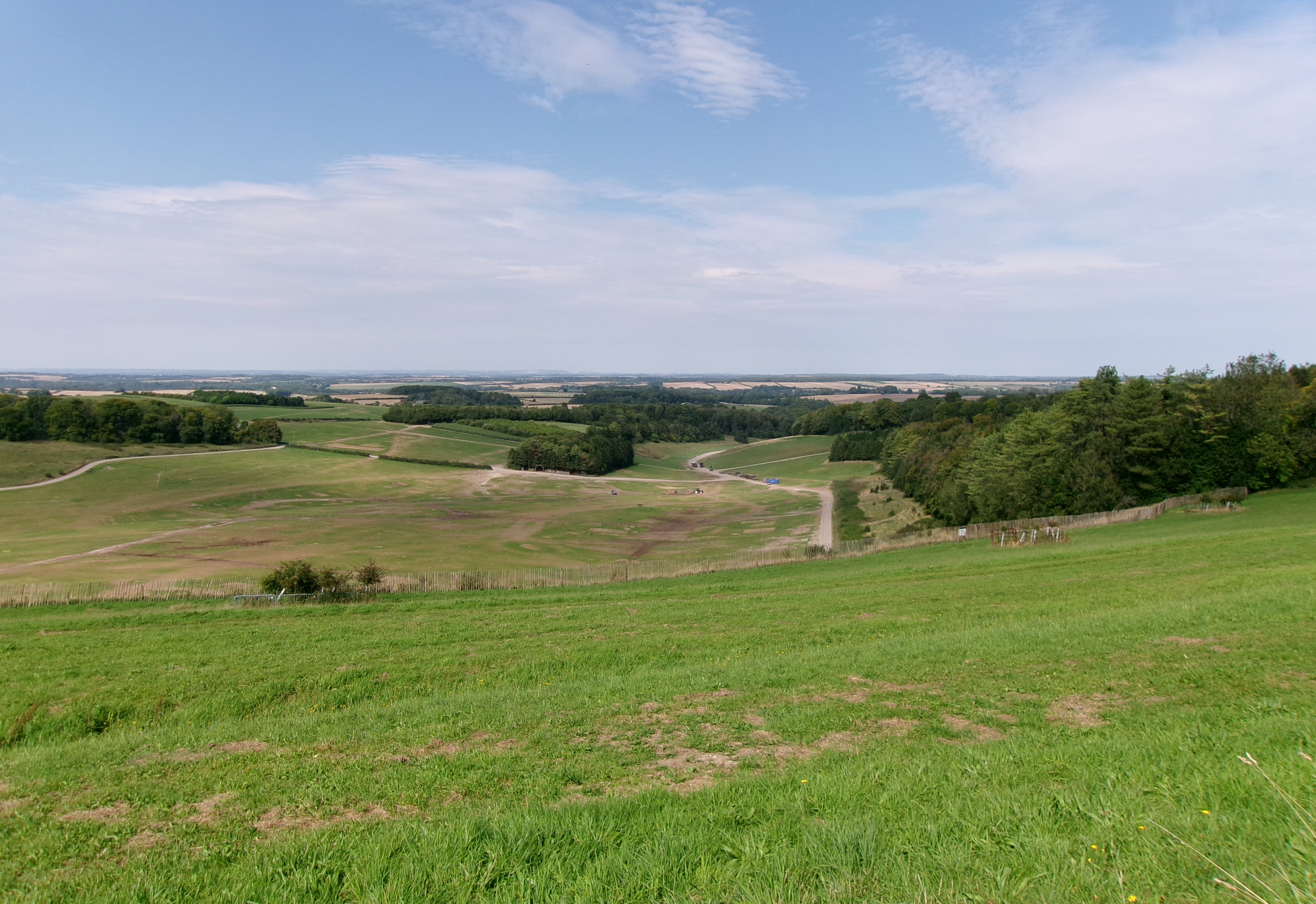
Panoramic view north over the bowl

Cheesefoot Head (/ˈtʃɛsfʊt/ CHESS-fuut) is a large natural amphitheatre (also known as Matterley Bowl) and beauty spot just outside Winchester, England. It is situated on the A272 road (South Downs Way). There are three bowl barrows on the site. The east, south and west walls of the amphitheatre are a 13.4-hectare (33-acre) biological Site of Special Scientific Interest (SSSI).

The SSSI is a steeply sloping area of chalk grassland, which is grazed by cattle and rabbits. There is a full range of downland grass species, especially fescues and bents. Herbs include dwarf thistle and fragrant orchid.

During the Second World War boxing events were held here for the entertainment of American troops stationed locally, and prior to D-Day, General Eisenhower addressed those troops.

The site has hosted a number of music festivals and concerts over the years, including Boomtown since 2010, Creamfields in its inaugural year of 1998, Homelands between 1999 and 2005, Glade in 2009. Because of this long history with a number of iconic events, many consider the grounds to be firmly entrenched in the roots of many notable acts and genres, especially dance and electronic music.

The adjacent motocross track within the Matterley Basin has in the past held the British round of the World Championship, as well as the Motocross of Nations. The site has also hosted the Tough Mudder endurance test series.
