= Lučice, Croatia =

Settlement in Croatia

Lučice
- settlement
- Interactive map of Lučice
- Location within Croatia
- Coordinates: 45°22′28″N 14°48′01″E
- Country: Croatia
- County: Primorje-Gorski Kotar
- City: Delnice

Area
  - Total: 26.4 km^{2} (10.2 sq mi)

Population (2021)
  - Total: 298
  - Density: 11.3/km^{2} (29.2/sq mi)
- Time zone: UTC+1 (CET)
  - Summer (DST): UTC+2 (CEST)
- Postal code: 51300 Delnice

Lučice is a settlement in the City of Delnice in Croatia. In 2021, its population was 298.

== History ==
On 29–30 January 1942, Partisans cut down 6 poles in Javornik.

On 16 May, Partisans destroyed part of the railway track between Lučice and Sopač, drailing a train, damaging the locomotive and 4 wagons.

From 31 January to 2 February 2014, while S and SW geostrophic wind dominated, freezing rain fell on Gorski Kotar, glazing the entire region. It wrecked roofs, power lines and forests, causing power loss for about 14,000 households in Gorski Kotar, or about 80% of its population. Because of power lines falling on the A6, the highway was closed in of Rijeka between Bosiljevo and Kikovica, and between Kikovica and Delnice in the direction of Zagreb. It took about 10 days to restore essential infrastructure to the region, and within months electricity was back in most of its former range, but at a cost of about 84.4 million HRK to HEP. At the time it was the largest peacetime damage since its Secession from Yugoslavia, even without counting the forestry losses. Clearing blocked forestry roads and forest paths would take years, and thanks to the declining population some were never cleared.

== Demographics ==
Lučice: Population trends 1857–2021
v

population				4	59	64	100	50	70	404	604	531	417	382	337	332	298
	1857	1869	1880	1890	1900	1910	1921	1931	1948	1953	1961	1971	1981	1991	2001	2011	2021

Sources: Croatian Bureau of Statistics publications

== Governance ==
=== Local ===
It is the seat of its own local committee.

== Sports ==
Beginning in 2013, the 7 stage 260 kilometres (160 mi) long Cycling Trail of Gorski Kotar (Croatian: Goranska biciklistička transverzala) passes through Lučice.

The "Gorski Kotar Bike Tour", held annually since 2012, sometimes goes through Lučice, such as in the first leg for 2023.

== Bibliography ==
- Trgo, Fabijan, ed. (1964). Zbornik dokumenata i podataka o Narodno-oslobodilačkom ratu Jugoslovenskih naroda. Vol. V, 32.
