= Lokve, Croatia =

Lokve
- Municipality
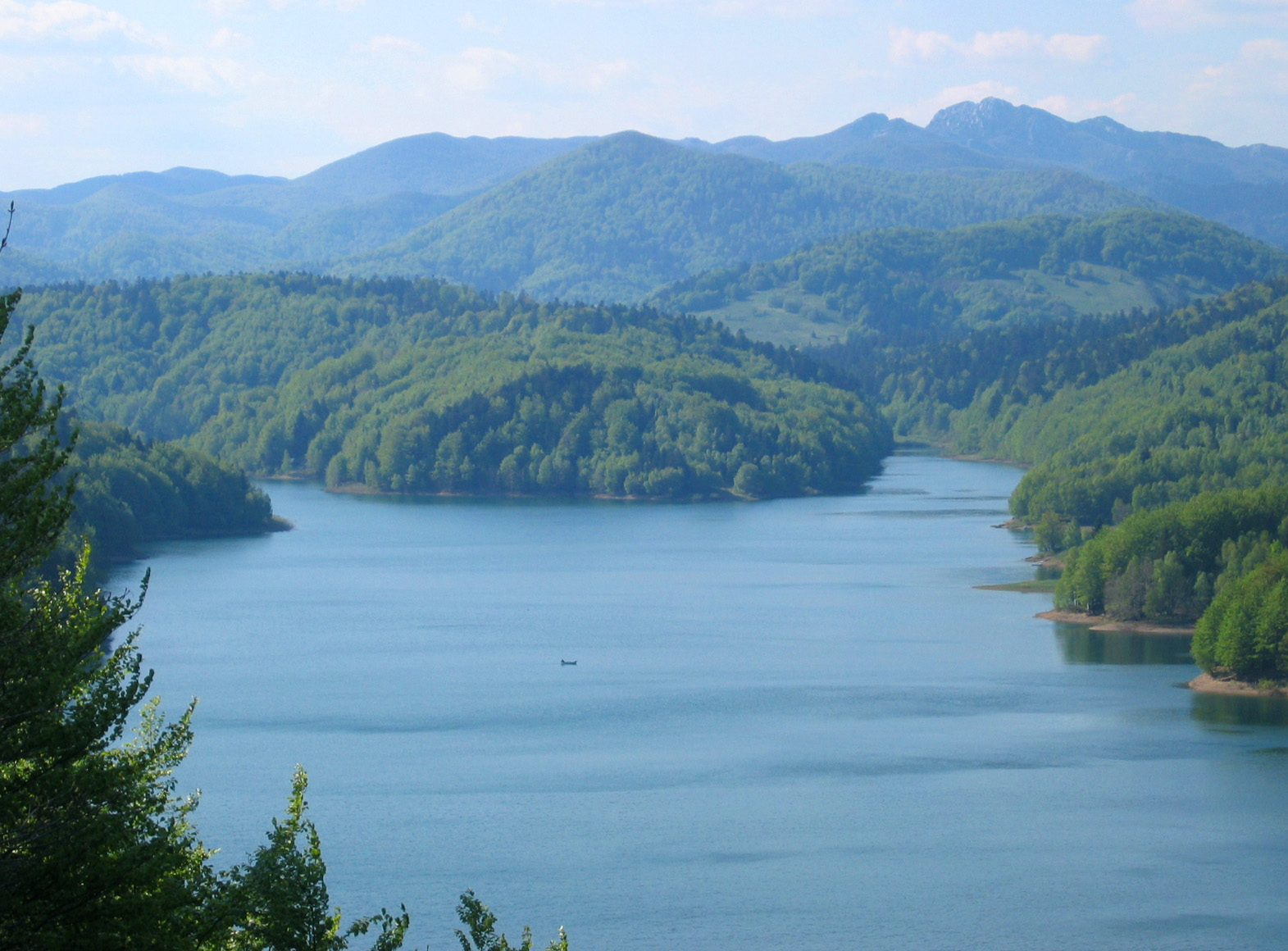
- Lake Lokve in Gorski kotar, Mt. Risnjak in the distance.

- Location of Lokve within Croatia
- Coordinates: 45°21′29″N 14°44′53″E
- Country: Croatia
- County: Primorje-Gorski Kotar County

Government
  - Mayor: Nevio Mihelčić

Area
  - Municipality: 42.0 km^{2} (16.2 sq mi)
  - Urban: 4.7 km^{2} (1.8 sq mi)

Population (2021)
  - Municipality: 850
  - Density: 20/km^{2} (52/sq mi)
  - Urban: 464
  - Urban density: 99/km^{2} (260/sq mi)
- Time zone: UTC+1 (CET)
  - Summer (DST): UTC+2 (CEST)
- Postal code: 51 316
- Area code: 051
- Website: lokve.hr

Lokve is a Croatian municipality in the Primorje–Gorski Kotar County. With an area of 42 km^{2}, it had a population of 850 in 2021.

The municipality is located in the mountainous region of Gorski kotar. The Lokvarsko Lake (Lokvarsko jezero) is located between the settlements of Homer and Mrzla Vodica.

== Geography ==
The dolines across the river Lokvarka from the meander are known as Ponikve.

== Climate ==
Between 1960 and 2016, the highest temperature recorded at the local weather station was 33.3 °C (91.9 °F), on 27 July 1983. The coldest temperature was −26.0 °C (−14.8 °F), on 8 January 1985.

== Demographics ==
In 1870, Lokve općina, in Delnice podžupanija, had 291 houses, with a population of 2173. Its 8 villages were divided into 2 porezne obćine for taxation purposes. Lokve had its own parish.

In 1895, the obćina of Lokve (court at Lokve), with an area of 42 square kilometres (16 mi^{2}), belonged to the kotar of Delnice (Delnice court and electoral district) in the županija of Modruš-Rieka (Ogulin court and financial board). There were 389 houses, with a population of 2363. Its 6 villages and 2 hamlets were divided for taxation purposes into 2 porezne obćine, under the Delnice office.

In 2021, the municipality consisted of the following settlements:

- Homer, population ▼225
- Lazac Lokvarski, population 18
- Lokve, population ▼464
- Mrzla Vodica, population ▼14
- Sleme, population ▼88
- Sopač, population ▼27
- Zelin Mrzlovodički, population ▼14
Municipality of Lokve: Population trends 1857–2021
v

population	2070	2061	2278	2363	2007	1972	2152	2087	1762	2516	1850	1522	1290	1255	1120	1049	850
	1857	1869	1880	1890	1900	1910	1921	1931	1948	1953	1961	1971	1981	1991	2001	2011	2021

Note:Split from the old Delnice općina. Sources: Croatian Bureau of Statistics publications
Town of Lokve: Population trends 1857–2021
v

population	1123	1231	1430	1442	1131	1022	1181	1050	989	1106	960	848	741	748	659	584	464
	1857	1869	1880	1890	1900	1910	1921	1931	1948	1953	1961	1971	1981	1991	2001	2011	2021

Sources: Croatian Bureau of Statistics publications

== Economy ==
There was a sawmill in Lokve.

== Governance ==
=== National ===
At the 1920 Kingdom of Serbs, Croats and Slovenes Constitutional Assembly election in Modruš-Rijeka County, Lokve voted mainly for the Communist Party and to a lesser extent the Croatian Union and Croatian People's Peasant Party.

Results at the poll in Lokve
Year	Voters	Electors	NRS	DSD	KPJ	HPSS	Independent	SS	HSP	HZ
1920	412	301		14	144	53	5	2	2	81

== History ==
Lokve was first mentioned on 22 February 1481 in a document freeing the citizens of Grič from tariffs in Lokve and elsewhere.

In 1860–1879, Matija Mažuranić wrote a 62 folio manuscript today titled Writings on the Building of Roads in Gorski Kotar and Lika (Croatian: Spisi o gradnji cesta u Gorskom Kotaru i Lici), today with signature HR-ZaNSK R 6424. A 21 folio manuscript dated 1872 titled Darstellung der Entstehung des Baues ... der Luisenstrasse together with a translation by I. Mikloušić is kept as HR-ZaNSK R 4572.

The volunteer fire department DVD Lokve was founded in 1905, and is today part of the Požarno područje Gorski Kotar I. Its current commander is Lordan Štokan.

=== Kingdom of Yugoslavia ===
A 22 December 1939 decision as part of agrarian reforms by Ban Šubašić to confiscate the local forest property of the Thurn and Taxis family, Kálmán Ghyczy and Nikola Petrović resulted in a legal dispute known as the Thurn and Taxis Affair, in part because of the relative status of the family and in part because of the proximity to the Italian border.

=== WWII ===
==== 1941 ====
In the morning of 13 April 1941, the bus carrying Ante Pavelić stopped in Lokve together with a throng of Ustaša followers. He went to the post office in Lokve for a telephone call to Zagreb.

==== 1942 ====
At 6:30 on 10 June 1942, Partisans intercepted an armed patrol from Lokve of 2 at Homer, heavily wounding Ivan Matijević in the battle, capturing and disarming Petar Ivićević and letting him return to Lokve. After disarming Matijević, a villager took him to Lokve where an Italian military doctor administered first aid and then transferred him to the Italian military hospital in Delnice.

On the 11th, an Italian train was attacked with rifle and machine gun fire between Lokve and Delnice, wounding a number of Italian soldiers.

On 15 July, a train encountered an improvised explosive device between Delnice and Lokve. There were no victims, and transport was restored shortly after.

==== 1945 ====
At the behest of Dušan Rašković, Adolf Hvala parish priest of Lokve and others gathered in Delnice signed a document recognising the JNOF on 21 February 1945, selecting a delegation to represent the priesthood before their authority.

=== Recent ===
From 31 January to 2 February 2014, while S and SW geostrophic wind dominated, freezing rain fell on Gorski Kotar, glazing the entire region. It wrecked roofs, power lines and forests, causing power loss for about 14,000 households in Gorski Kotar, or about 80% of its population. Because of power lines falling on the A6, the highway was closed in of Rijeka between Bosiljevo and Kikovica, and between Kikovica and Delnice in the direction of Zagreb. It took about 10 days to restore essential infrastructure to the region, and within months electricity was back in most of its former range, but at a cost of about 84.4 million HRK to HEP. At the time it was the largest peacetime damage since its Secession from Yugoslavia, even without counting the forestry losses. The Šumarija Lokve lost 23% of its wood mass. Clearing blocked forestry roads and forest paths would take years, and thanks to the declining population some were never cleared.

== Culture ==
Since 1974, Lokve hosts the festival Žabarska noć.

== Sports ==
The 1st Underwater Orienteering World Championships was held in Lokve in 1973.

=== Cycling ===
Beginning in 2013, the 7 stage 260 kilometres (160 mi) long Cycling Trail of Gorski Kotar (Croatian: Goranska biciklistička transverzala) passes through Lokve.

The "Gorski Kotar Bike Tour", held annually since 2012, sometimes goes through Lokve, such as in the first leg for 2022.

=== Mountaineering ===
The local HPS chapter was called HPD "Runolist", but it was liquidated on 7 October 1936.

== Infrastructure ==
=== Judiciary ===
In 1875, the kotar court of Delnice encompassed a population of 28,347, being responsible for the općine: Delnice, Lokve, Fužine, Mrkopalj, Ravna Gora, Brod, Skrad, Vrbovsko.

== Notable people ==
- Ivan Furlan (1920 – 2000), psychologist

== Bibliography (finished) ==
- OONF PGO (1945-03-19). "Svećenstvo Gorskog Kotara pristupa JNOf-i". Primorski vjesnik: Glasilo jedinstvene Narodno-oslobodilačke fronte Hrvatskog primorja (in Serbo-Croatian). No. 144. p. 4.

== Bibliography ==
=== General ===
- Leksikografski zavod Miroslav Krleža (2013–2024). "Ličko polje". Hrvatska enciklopedija (online ed.). Archived from the original on 2023-12-28.

=== Biology ===
- Šašić, Martina; Nahirnić, Ana; Tarmann, Gerhard M. (2016-12-31). "Zygaenidae (Lepidoptera) in the Lepidoptera collections of the Croatian Natural History Museum". Natura Croatica: Periodicum Musei Historiae Naturalis Croatici. 25 (2): 233–248. doi:10.20302/NC.2016.25.19. eISSN 1848-7386.

=== Folklore ===
- Krmpotić, Marinko (2009). "Lokvarske vile i vilenjaci". Sušačka revija: Glasilo za kulturu i društvena zbivanja. 17 (66–67): 81–83. ISSN 1330-1306. Archived from the original on 2024-04-01.

=== History ===
- Prusac, Stjepan (2023-09-26) [defended 2023-09-25]. Posjedi obitelji Thurn Taxis nakon 1918. godine [Thurn Taxis Estates in Croatia after First World War] (Thesis) (in Croatian). Zagreb: Filozofski fakultet Sveučilišta u Zagrebu.
- n.s. (1984). Goranska kiparska radionica Lokve: Gorski Kotar - Hrvatska - Jugoslavija. Online publication 2009-09-21.
- Trgo, Fabijan, ed. (1964). Zbornik dokumenata i podataka o Narodno-oslobodilačkom ratu Jugoslovenskih naroda. Vol. V, 32.
- Banska vlast Banovine Hrvatske (1940b). "Gospodarska prosvjeta i banovinska dobra". Godišnjak banske vlasti Banovine Hrvatske. Vol. 1. pp. 89–96.
- Urednik (1914-03-07). "Iz ABC družtva". Jutarnji list (in Croatian). Vol. 3, no. 607. p. 5. ISSN 1334-1855.

==== Genealogy ====
- Barac-Grum, Vida (1987-06-28). "Pogled na gorskokotarsku povijesnu antroponimiju" [An Outlook on the Historical Anthroponymy of Gorski Kotar]. Rasprave Instituta za hrvatski jezik (in Croatian). 13 (1): 5–8. ISSN 1331-6745.

=== Speleology ===
- n.s. (1984). Spilja Lokvarka. Online publication 2009-09-21.

=== Tourism ===
- Hirc, Dragutin (1898) [written 1898-02-08]. "Lokve". Gorski kotar: slike, opisi i putopisi. Illustrated by Václav Lev Anderle. Zagreb: 🖶 Lavoslav Hartman (Kugli i Deutsch). pp. 24–29. Republished as Hirc, Dragutin (1993) [written 1898-02-08]. "Lokve". Gorski kotar: slike, opisi i putopisi. Illustrated by Václav Lev Anderle. Rijeka: 🖶 Tiskara Rijeka. pp. 24–29. ISBN 953-158-004-9.
