= Home Again =

Home Again may refer to:

== Film and television ==
- Home Again (2012 film), a Canadian drama directed by Sudz Sutherland
- Home Again (2017 film), an American romantic comedy directed by Hallie Meyers-Shyer
- Home Again (2022 film), a Gambian documentary film directed by Babucarr Manka
- Home Again (TV series), a 2006 British sitcom
- Bob Vila's Home Again, a television program hosted by Bob Vila
- "Home Again" (Falcon Crest), a 1990 television episode
- "Home Again" (The X-Files), a 2016 television episode

== Music ==
=== Albums ===
- Home...Again or the title song, by Abigail, 2005
- Home Again! (Doc Watson album), 1966
- Home Again (Edwyn Collins album) or the title song, 2007
- Home Again (Jimmy Somerville album) or the title song, 2004
- Home Again (Judy Collins album) or the title song, 1984
- Home Again (Michael Kiwanuka album) or the title song (see below), 2012
- Home Again (New Edition album) or the title song, 1996
- Home Again (The Tambourines album) or the title song, 2003

=== Songs ===
- "Home Again" (Michael Kiwanuka song), 2012
- Home Again (Elton John song), 2013
- "Home Again", by The Auteurs from New Wave, 1993
- "Home Again", by Barry Manilow from Barry Manilow II, 1974
- "Home Again", by Beach House from Devotion, 2008
- "Home Again", by Blackmore's Night from Fires at Midnight, 2001
- "Home Again", by Bryan Adams from Into the Fire, 1987
- "Home Again", by Carole King from Tapestry, 1971
- "Home Again", by Disco Biscuits from They Missed the Perfume, 2001
- "Home Again", by Hear'Say, 2001
- "Home Again", by Hootie & the Blowfish from Musical Chairs, 1998
- "Home Again!", by Menahan Street Band from Make the Road by Walking, 2008
- "Home Again", by Oingo Boingo from BOI-NGO, 1987
- "Home Again", by Shihad from Shihad, 1996
- "Home Again", by Stone Sour from Audio Secrecy, 2010

== See also ==
- Home Again, Home Again, a 2007 EP by Hem
- Back Home Again (disambiguation)
