= Sopač =

- Village
- Interactive map of Sopač
- Location within Croatia
- Coordinates: 45.357°N 14.772°E
- Country: Croatia
- County: Primorje-Gorski Kotar County
- City: Lokve

Area
  - Total: 1.4 km^{2} (0.54 sq mi)

Population (2021)
  - Total: 27
  - Density: 19/km^{2} (50/sq mi)
- Time zone: UTC+1 (CET)
  - Summer (DST): UTC+2 (CEST)
- Postal code: 51300 Delnice

Sopač is a village in Croatia, in the Lokve municipality, in Primorje-Gorski Kotar County.

== History ==
After the Lujzijana was built, the Družtvo lujzinske ceste constructed two houses in Sopač together with a cistern. In 1874, the society would sell all its assets along the road, including those in Sopač.

On 16 May, Partisans destroyed part of the railway track between Lučice and Sopač, drailing a train, damaging the locomotive and 4 wagons.

== Demographics ==
Village of Sopač: Population trends 1857–2021
v

| population | 49 | 19 | 20 | 39 | 69 | 79 | 19 | 105 | 19 | 44 | 59 | 60 | 49 | 50 | 55 | 39 | 27 |
| | 1857 | 1869 | 1880 | 1890 | 1900 | 1910 | 1921 | 1931 | 1948 | 1953 | 1961 | 1971 | 1981 | 1991 | 2001 | 2011 | 2021 |

Sources: Croatian Bureau of Statistics publications

== Sports ==
Beginning in 2013, the 7 stage 260 kilometres (160 mi) long Cycling Trail of Gorski Kotar (Croatian: Goranska biciklistička transverzala) passes through Sopač.

== Bibliography ==
- Trgo, Fabijan, ed. (1964). Zbornik dokumenata i podataka o Narodno-oslobodilačkom ratu Jugoslovenskih naroda. Vol. V, 32.
