= Zelin Mrzlovodički =

- Village
- Interactive map of Zelin Mrzlovodički
- Coordinates: 45°22′55″N 14°40′59″E
- Country: Croatia
- County: Primorje-Gorski Kotar County
- Town: Lokve

Area
  - Total: 5.7 km^{2} (2.2 sq mi)

Population (2021)
  - Total: 14
  - Density: 2.5/km^{2} (6.4/sq mi)
- Time zone: UTC+1 (CET)
  - Summer (DST): UTC+2 (CEST)

Zelin Mrzlovodički is a village in Primorje-Gorski Kotar County in Croatia, on the territory of the city of Lokve.

== History ==
On 12 December 2017, a severe wind hit the area, blocking traffic along the Ž5032 road.

== Demographics ==
Village of Zelin Mrzlovodički: Population trends 1857–2021
v

population	38	59	50	46	52	54	49	61	47	77	54	37	18	11	14	16	14
	1857	1869	1880	1890	1900	1910	1921	1931	1948	1953	1961	1971	1981	1991	2001	2011	2021

Note:"Zelin" in 1857. Sources: Croatian Bureau of Statistics publications

== Sports ==
Beginning in 2013, the 7 stage 260 kilometres (160 mi) long Cycling Trail of Gorski Kotar (Croatian: Goranska biciklistička transverzala) passes through Zelin Mrzlovodički.

The "Gorski Kotar Bike Tour", held annually since 2012, sometimes goes through Homer, such as in the second leg for 2023.
