= Home (video game) =

2012 video game

- Developer: BancyCo
- Publisher: BancyCo
- Producer: Nancy Yeung
- Designer: Benjamin Rivers
- Programmer: Benjamin Rivers
- Writer: Benjamin Rivers
- Composer: Ivor Stines
- Platforms: Windows; Mac OS X; iOS; PlayStation 4; PlayStation Vita; Nintendo Switch
- Release: June 1, 2012: Windows: June 1, 2012; Mac, iOS: June 20, 2013; PS4: October 28, 2014; PS Vita: November 4, 2014; Switch: October 8, 2020
- Mode: Single-player

Home is a 2012 horror adventure indie video game developed and published by BancyCo (previously known as Benjamin Rivers Inc.). It was first released for Microsoft Windows on June 1, 2012. It was ported to Mac OS X and iOS in 2013, and to PlayStation 4 and PlayStation Vita in 2014. In 2020, it was released for Nintendo Switch as Home: Postmortem Edition, with an added behind-the-scenes tour mode.

== Gameplay ==
Home is a sidescrolling choose-your-own-adventure game in which an unnamed protagonist wakes up in a house with no memories and must discover what has happened. The gameplay consists simply of walking through the 2D world, examining objects, and making yes-or-no decisions. Some critics have suggested the title is not really a game in the traditional sense, but instead a work of interactive storytelling. At the start, the game recommends players complete it in one sitting; a typical playthrough lasts around 1–1.5 hours.

== Development ==
Home was developed primarily by Benjamin Rivers (namesake of studio Benjamin Rivers Inc., later renamed to BancyCo), with Nancy Yeung as producer and Ivor Stines credited for the title music. The game was developed in GameMaker and was originally planned as an iPad game, according to Rivers, but instead was released initially on PC only. The game had to be updated to a newer version of the engine before it could be released on iOS and OS X on June 20, 2013. In March 2014, Rivers announced that the game would be coming to PlayStation platforms that year; it was ultimately released for PlayStation 4 on October 28 and PlayStation Vita on November 4.

On October 8, 2020, an expanded version of the game titled Home: Postmortem Edition was released on Nintendo Switch. This edition added new areas and clues to the story as well as commentary from the developer.

== Reception ==
Home

Aggregate score
| Aggregator | Score |
|---|---|
| Metacritic | PC: 69/100 iOS: 76/100 |

Review scores
| Publication | Score |
|---|---|
| 4Players | PC: 8.0/10 |
| GameSpot | PC: 7/10 |
| GamesTM | PC: 8/10 |
| IGN | PC: 6.5/10 |
| Nintendo World Report | Switch: 8/10 |
| PC PowerPlay | PC: 4/10 |
| Pocket Gamer | iOS: 8/10 |
| Polygon | PC: 8/10 |
| Push Square | PS4: 7/10 |
| TouchArcade | iOS: 4.5/5 |

Home was met with a wide range of reviews. The original PC release has an Metacritic average score of 69/100, while the iOS release has a 76/100 average (all other releases do not have enough reviews for an average to be calculated). Several reviews praised the game's horror aesthetics and art style; Chris Schilling of Pocket Gamer writes that the "simple but evocative pixel-art conjures an atmosphere as rich as any big-budget horror". The game's experimental narrative style, in which the player makes yes-or-no decisions and often does not receive clear feedback about the effect of these decisions, was described as both a strength and a weakness; Kevin VanOrd of GameSpot writes, "that same ambiguity that stirs your intellect can also frustrate you". Several reviewers said that the game lost its "magic" on repeated playthroughs; Katie Williams of PC PowerPlay writes that such playthroughs are "like pulling aside Disneyland's curtains to reveal the grime-choked cogs behind them".
