= Home Free =

Home Free may refer to:

== Music ==
- Home Free (group), an American a cappella group
- Home Free (Dan Fogelberg album), 1972
- Home Free (Red Rodney album), 1979
- Homefree, a 2009 album by Fanu
- Homefree, a 2010 album by Nnenna Freelon

== Other uses ==
- Home Free (1993 TV series), an American sitcom
- Home Free (2015 TV series), an American reality series
- Home Free (2023 film), an American comedy film directed by Aaron Brown
- Home Free (2024 film), a Canadian drama film directed by Avi Federgreen
- Home Free!, a 1964 play by Lanford Wilson
- Wanda Homefree, a fictional character from the comic Little Annie Fanny

== See also ==
- Free Home, Georgia, US, an unincorporated community
