= Homerus (disambiguation) =

Homerus is the Greek poet Homer, the author of the Iliad and the Odyssey.

Homerus may also refer to:

- Homerus of Byzantium, 3rd century ancient Greek grammarian and tragic poet
- 5700 Homerus, an asteroid
- MS Trelleborg (1958), a ship that was later renamed Homerus
- Papilio homerus, the Homerus swallowtail butterfly of Jamaica
