= Home Island, Newfoundland and Labrador =

Home Island
- Location within Newfoundland and Labrador

Geography
- Coordinates: 60°10′N 64°16′W
- Area: 12 km^{2} (4.6 sq mi)
- Highest elevation: 151 m (495 ft)

Administration
- Canada
- Province: Newfoundland and Labrador

Home Island is an island off of the east coast of Labrador.
