= Home (nightclub) =

Music venue and nightclub in London, England

Coordinates: 51.5107°N 0.1309°W

- Interactive map of Home
- Location: Leicester Square, London
- Owner: Big Beat International
- Capacity: 2,400
- Type: Nightclub
- Event: Electronic music

Construction
- Opened: 1999
- Closed: 2001

Home was a music venue and nightclub located at 1 Leicester Square in central London. It was closed by Westminster Council in late March 2001 due to alleged evidence of open drug-dealing occurring within the club despite its famously tough door checks. The club went into receivership shortly after it was closed. It was part of the Home nightclub chain owned by Big Beats, including the clubs in Sydney and London, as well as the Homelands outdoor festivals. The decline of the club started earlier however due to Westminster council denying the club a 6am licence.

== History ==
The club opened in September 1999 and during its existence it was one of the most popular clubs in the United Kingdom. It was considered to be foremost amongst the UK's superclubs whilst it was open. Paul Oakenfold was a resident DJ at the club and also its "director of music policy", and was one of many top DJs who were resident at the club. Weekly residents we also Steve Lawler, Parks & Wilson, Tim Sheridan, Paul Barkworth and Dave Haslam. Both Oakenfold and Lawler left before the demise of club, as did Darren Hughes one of the founders leaving Paul Barkworth taking over the club and the music programming.

The premises had a legal fire capacity of 2,400 and was spread over 7 floors. Like many clubs a much higher number was usual. However, on most weekday nights the capacity was reduced to 1,775 and only floors 2-4 were open to the public. Weekends were at capacity from its birth to demise. Many of the staff and management ended up at the sister venue in Sydney, Australia.

=== Post closure ===
Since the closure, the venue has been used for a number of purposes including another nightclub known as The Marquee Club, which also closed within 18 months of its opening in 2004. Currently the premises are used by MTV and was the location of the television show 1 Leicester Square. It is currently used as the studio for the UK version of Total Request Live. The fate of the building as a licensed premises was continually put into question by the very force that initially licensed it, Westminster Council.

Located in the heart of Leicester Square, Home became Vertigo and later The Penthouse, a multi-purpose venue.
