= Honing =

Honing may refer to:

- Honing (metalworking), machining a surface by scrubbing an abrasive stone against it
- Sharpening edged tools with a manual hone
- Honing, Norfolk, English village

== People with the surname ==
- Henkjan Honing (born 1959), Dutch musician
- Yuri Honing (born 1965), Dutch saxophonist
- Edward Honing
- William Honing

== See also ==
- Hone, the machine tool used in honing (metalworking)
- Homing (disambiguation)
