= Sleme, Lokve =

Sleme
- Village
- Interactive map of Sleme
- Location within Croatia
- Coordinates: 45.350°N 14.753°E
- Country: Croatia
- County: Primorje-Gorski Kotar County
- City: Lokve

Area
  - Total: 5 km^{2} (1.9 sq mi)

Population (2021)
  - Total: 88
  - Density: 18/km^{2} (46/sq mi)
- Time zone: UTC+1 (CET)
  - Summer (DST): UTC+2 (CEST)
- Postal code: 51300 Delnice

Sleme is a village in Croatia, in the Lokve municipality, in Primorje-Gorski Kotar County.

== Demographics ==
Village of Sleme: Population trends 1857–2021
v

population	75	76	99	98	88	84	73	90	67	84	94	72	63	66	69	104	88
	1857	1869	1880	1890	1900	1910	1921	1931	1948	1953	1961	1971	1981	1991	2001	2011	2021

Note:"Sleme" until 1890. Sources: Croatian Bureau of Statistics publications

== Sports ==
Beginning in 2013, the 7 stage 260 kilometres (160 mi) long Cycling Trail of Gorski Kotar (Croatian: Goranska biciklistička transverzala) passes through Sleme.

The "Gorski Kotar Bike Tour", held annually since 2012, sometimes goes through Sleme, such as in the first leg for 2022.
