= Homer High School =

Homer High School may refer to:

- Homer High School (Alaska) in Homer, Alaska
- Homer High School (Louisiana) in Homer, Louisiana
- Homer High School (Michigan) in Homer, Michigan
- Homer Central High School in Homer (town), New York
