= Home Again (2022 film) =

2022 Gambian film

- Directed by: Babucarr Manka
- Produced by: Alhagie Manka; Don Edkins; Tiny Mungwe
- Production companies: State of Mic; Arte France; Deutsche Welle Akademie; Robert Bosch Stiftung; Social Transformation and Empowerment Projects (STEPS); Bertha Foundation; German Federal Ministry for Economic Cooperation and Development and German Cooperation
- Distributed by: Social Transformation and Empowerment Projects (STEPS)
- Release date: 7 May 2022 (DOK.fest Munich)
- Running time: 40 minutes
- Countries: The Gambia; South Africa
- Languages: Mandinka; Wolof; English

Home Again is a 2022 Gambian documentary film written and directed by Babucarr Manka. The film elaborates about the migration crisis and depicts the circumstances which have forced the Africans to migrate to European nations in pursuit of better career opportunities and access to high quality of life. The film reveals how the International Organization for Migration organizes the repatriation process of the African immigrants to send them back to their own home nations who all arrived to the major European nations as refugees. The film was screened as a world premiere on 7 May 2022 in the African Encounters category at the Internationales Dokumentarfilmfestival München (DOK.fest München) and it was the only Gambian film to have been premiered during the 2022 edition of the DOK.fest Munich.

== Synopsis ==
There is a huge emphasis on the reintegration systems for returning migrants through a portrait of 23-year-old Paabi who returns to his native country, The Gambia after his second successive failed attempt. Following Paabi's first attempt of migration, Paabi had eventually lost all his reintegration funds when his rich uncle misused those funds in a timber business. Despite the major setback in terms of financial perspective, he attempted again for migration only to be deported back to his mother country. He insists not to try migrating for the third time knowing full well beforehand, he will only be deported back again by the officials and instead decided to stay in The Gambia whereas it was not easy to survive more than before.

== Production ==
The filming of the film began way back in 2018 with Generation Africa training aspiring African filmmakers across all of Africa on how to produce quality documentaries to depict the real life stories in silverscreen. The filmmakers of Home Again secured funding from Arte France for the production of the film and the filmmakers had to compete against 180 different applicants in order to obtain the funding.

The film was produced by Generation Africa in collaboration with State of Mic, Arte France, Deutsche Welle Akademie, Robert Bosch Stiftung, Social Transformation and Empowerment Projects (STEPS), Bertha Foundation, German Federal Ministry for Economic Cooperation and Development and German Cooperation.

The film project marked third collaboration between director Babucarr Manka and producer Alhagie Manka after Welcome to the Smiling Coast and Gifts from Babylon. It was revealed that the film was inspired based on a meeting between African and European leaders in Malta who all had discussed regarding the importance of tacking the challenge of migration crisis through active cooperation and collaboration. The meeting became fruitful and the cause was materialised as whopping 4.5 billion Euros were generated after the meeting had concluded. The amount was generated to confront and combat the key factors such as conflict and poverty which were the main drivers of migration and the film subsequently portrayed the real exploration of how the funds which were generated through the meeting had been collected and distributed in order to create reintegration packages for the migrants.
