= Home Islands =

Home Islands may refer to:

- British Isles
- Japanese archipelago
- Home Islands (Nunavut), Canada
- Home Islands (Queensland), Australia

== See also ==
- Home Island (disambiguation)
