= Homeric (disambiguation) =

Homeric is an adjective meaning of, relating to, or characteristic of Homer.

Homeric may also refer to:

- Homeric Greek, a form of Ancient Greek employed by Homer
- RMS Homeric (1922), White Star Line ship originally known as Columbus (1913)
- SS Homeric, a Home Lines ship renamed in 1953 from the original SS Mariposa (1931)
- MS Homeric, built 1986 (renamed MS Westerdam in 1988)
- Homeric simile, a long and descriptive simile common in Homer
- Homeric Hymns, a set of hymns once attributed to Homer but now named “Homeric” because of similarities in meter, formulas, and dialect

== See also ==
- Homerian
