= Home Sweet Home =

Home Sweet Home may refer to:

== Film ==
- Home, Sweet Home (1914 film), a film about the life of John Howard Payne
- Home Sweet Home (1917 film), a British silent film
- Home Sweet Home (1926 film), a silent film drama
- Home, Sweet Home (1933 film), a British film starring Richard Cooper
- Home Sweet Home (1945 film), a British comedy film starring Frank Randle
- Home Sweet Home (1951 film), a Japanese film
- Home Sweet Home (1970 film), a Taiwanese film awarded a Golden Horse Award for Best Feature Film
- Home Sweet Home (1973 film), a Belgian film directed by Benoît Lamy
- Home Sweet Home (1981 film), a slasher film starring Jake Steinfeld
- Home Sweet Home (1982 film), a Mike Leigh television film
- Home Sweet Home (2005 film), a Hong Kong horror film
- Hanasaku Iroha: The Movie – Home Sweet Home, a 2013 Japanese animated film
- Home Sweet Home (2013 film), a horror film starring Meghan Heffern
- Home Sweet Home (2014 film), an Indian Konkani language comedy film
- Home Sweet Home 2, a 2015 Indian Konkani language film
- Home Sweet Home (2016 film), a Kosovan film
- Home Sweet Home Alone, a 2021 American Christmas comedy film
- Home Sweet Home (2025 Danish film), a drama film
- Home Sweet Home (2025 Polish film), a drama film

== Music ==
- Home Sweet Home Records

=== Songs ===
- "Home! Sweet Home!", an 1823 song by Henry Bishop and John Howard Payne
- "Home Sweet Home" (G-Dragon song), 2024
- "Home Sweet Home" (Mötley Crüe song), 1985
- "Home Sweet Home" (The Farm song), 2011
- "Home Sweet Home" (Dennis Robbins song), 1992
- "Home Sweet Home", a song by Yuki

=== Albums ===
- Home Sweet Home (Kano album)
- Home Sweet Home (Katherine Jenkins album), 2014
- Home Sweet Home, a 1970 solo album by American singer-songwriter Terry Manning
- Home Sweet Home, a 1993 album by American hip-hop group House of Krazees

== Television ==
- Home Sweet Home (Australian TV series), a 1980 Australian sitcom
- Home Sweet Home (2010 TV series), a 2010 South Korean drama
- Home Sweet Home (2013 TV series), a 2013 Philippine drama
- Home Sweet Home (American TV series), a 2021 America reality social experiment series
- Home Sweet Home (Ghanaian TV series), an English-language Ghanaian family television drama series
- "Home Sweet Home" (Alvin and the Chipmunks), a 1989 episode
- "Home Sweet Home" (Degrassi High), a 1991 episode
- "Home Sweet Home" (Entourage), a 2011 episode
- "Home Sweet Home" (The Good Life), a 1976 episode
- "Home Sweet Home" (The Walking Dead), a 2021 episode

== Other uses ==
- Home Sweet Home (2007 video game), a 2007/2008 game for PC and WiiWare
- Home Sweet Home (2017 video game), a 2017 horror game
- Home Sweet Home (museum), a historic house and museum in East Hampton Village District, New York
- Home Sweet Home, a novel by Jeanne Betancourt
- H2S (radar)

== See also ==
- "Home Sweet Home/Bittersweet Symphony", a 2005 medley by Limp Bizkit
- Home Sweet Homer (musical), a notorious Broadway flop
- "Home Sweet Homeless", an episode of the TV series The Care Bears
- "Home Sweet Homes", an episode of the TV series Barney & Friends
