= Home (nightclub chain) =

The Home chain of nightclubs was initially started at the height of popularity of house music. The chain was originally called "Jacobs" until being bought out in 2015. The clubs are notorious for their "anti mobile phones" policy, where phones are confiscated before entrance, and when people breach this rule, a form of "punishment" is implemented. The two clubs were two of the largest nightclubs at the time in their respective countries, and were two of a number of dance music enterprises operated by the one company, including various other smaller clubs and the outdoor music festival Homelands.

The broader chain, including the Home Club in London and its outdoor events, eventually folded. Home in Sydney has continued as a successful venue and hosts many famous dance music DJs.

== Background ==
At its peak, the Home Nightclub chain included two large clubs in Sydney and London, as well as hosting the outdoor dance music festival, Homelands. The Nightclub chain was the dream of Ron McCulloch and Big Beats (Inc) who had intended for a broader worldwide chain of clubs, which included advanced plans for a New York club, as well as plans for clubs in Singapore and Buenos Aires and outdoor events held in various part of the world. The club is notorious for its no mobile phones policy, which comes with "punishments" for people who fail to follow the rules. The idea of the clubs was that they would beam performances of DJs to each other, and have International events by transmission. The two clubs in Sydney and London were among the biggest Dance music clubs in their respected countries.

== Club openings ==
The Sydney Home Club was the first to open on 13 November 1998 by Antonio Zambarelli, Paul Collings, George Swanson and Ron McCulloch (Big Beat Australia) in Cockle Bay, Darling Harbour. It is a purpose built nightclub, and with a 2000 person capacity it is one of Australia's biggest regular house music venues. The interior was designed by Ron McCulloch, and features a number of different spaces. The main dancefloor holds 700 people. It cost A$10 million to build.

The London Home Club (see full article Home (nightclub)) was a "superclub" which opened in 1998 in Leicester Square, in central London. It had eight levels, and cost £8.5m to build, after hard negotiations over building at the Leicester Square site.

== Closure of London Home and the collapse of Big Beat ==
Home in London was shut by police only after 2 years of operation. Its licence was revoked by police due to evidence of obvious drug dealing in the premises, flagged by an undercover police operation which discovered "open and serious Class A drug dealing and usage". At this stage, Home London was owned by Big Beats Pubs and Club Empire, it being jointly owned by Mr McCulloch, George Swanson (the former Whitbread director), and Royal Bank Development Capital.

The closing of Home London affected the Big Beats company, which then went into receivership. While the licence was reinstated, it was too late for Big Beat. Big Beat's Home nightclubs assets were initially contracted by the receiver, KPMG, to be run by the Mean Fiddler business. The London club was then purchased for £20m by Mean Fiddler, owned by John Vincent Power. However, Ron McCulloch, from Big Beat, then purchased the Sydney Home Club himself and moved to Australia

== Continuation of Sydney Home ==
Sydney Home (now officially called Home The Venue) continues to operate as a successful venue, at the popular Darling Harbour waterside entertainment district in Sydney. In the early 2000s it incorporated the successful Pitt Street club Sublime which was started in the late 1990s, and run by Simon Page. Simon brought the three nights that were being run at Sublime, Beatfix, Cargo and Voodoo and moved its DJs (including Peewee Ferris, Nik Fish, Craig Obey, Bexta and Kate Monroe) into Home's Friday night. The Friday Sublime night has continued to run successfully since that time. After some arising family issues, Simon sold his interest to McCulloch. In 2005, McCulloch sold the club back to Simon page for roughly what he had purchased it for. With the downturn from the peak of interest in dance music, and the return of an interest in rock, Sydney Home expanded into rock music in 2006, hosting bands on Saturday nights, then followed by DJs.

== See also ==
- List of electronic dance music venues
