= Google Home =

Google Home may refer to:

- Google Nest, a smart-home brand formed by the merger of Google Home and Nest Labs
- Google Nest (smart speakers), a series of smart speakers formerly branded "Google Home"
- Google Home (platform), a mobile and web app for managing smart-home appliances

== See also ==
- Google Assistant, a voice assistant that formerly powered Google Home devices
  - Gemini (chatbot), the successor to the Google Assistant
- Google Search, the homepage of the google.com domain
- Google Personalized Homepage, a discontinued personal web portal
