= Sljeme =

Sljeme may refer to:

- Sljeme, mountain peak of Medvednica, Croatia
- Sljeme transmitter, TV/radio transmitter on Sljeme peak
- Sljeme (company), Croatian malletier atelier
- Sljeme, Krapina-Zagorje County, a village near Stubičke Toplice

== See also ==
- Sleme (disambiguation)
