= Home Township =

Home Township may refer to:

- Home Township, Nemaha County, Kansas, Nemaha County, Kansas
- Home Township, Montcalm County, Michigan
- Home Township, Newaygo County, Michigan
- Home Township, Brown County, Minnesota
- Home Township, Turner County, South Dakota, in Turner County, South Dakota
