= Homer Township =

Homer Township may refer to:

== Illinois ==
- Homer Township, Will County, Illinois

== Iowa ==
- Homer Township, Benton County, Iowa
- Homer Township, Buchanan County, Iowa

== Michigan ==
- Homer Township, Calhoun County, Michigan
- Homer Township, Midland County, Michigan

== Minnesota ==
- Homer Township, Winona County, Minnesota

== Missouri ==
- Homer Township, Bates County, Missouri

== Ohio ==
- Homer Township, Medina County, Ohio
- Homer Township, Morgan County, Ohio

== Pennsylvania ==
- Homer Township, Potter County, Pennsylvania

== South Dakota ==
- Homer Township, Day County, South Dakota, in Day County, South Dakota
