= Homer, Croatia =

Homer
- Village
- Interactive map of Homer
- Location within Croatia
- Coordinates: 45.361°N 14.729°E
- Country: Croatia
- County: Primorje-Gorski Kotar County
- City: Lokve

Area
  - Total: 5.7 km^{2} (2.2 sq mi)

Population (2021)
  - Total: 225
  - Density: 39/km^{2} (100/sq mi)
- Time zone: UTC+1 (CET)
  - Summer (DST): UTC+2 (CEST)
- Postal code: 51300 Delnice

Homer is a village in Croatia, in the Lokve municipality, in Primorje-Gorski Kotar County.

== History ==
During WWII, Homer ended up on the border of Croatia. On 8 June 1942, a group of Partisans attacked Homer, from which the Croatian border guards retreated. The Partisans carried out certain robberies and then retreated. At 6:30 on the 10th, Partisans intercepted an armed patrol from Lokve of 2 at Homer, heavily wounding Ivan Matijević in the battle, capturing and disarming Petar Ivićević and letting him return to Lokve. After disarming Matijević, a villager took him to Lokve where an Italian military doctor administered first aid and then transferred him to the Italian military hospital in Delnice.

== Sports ==
In 1860–1879, Matija Mažuranić wrote a 62 folio manuscript today titled Writings on the Building of Roads in Gorski Kotar and Lika (Croatian: Spisi o gradnji cesta u Gorskom Kotaru i Lici), today with signature HR-ZaNSK R 6424. A 21 folio manuscript dated 1872 titled Darstellung der Entstehung des Baues ... der Luisenstrasse together with a translation by I. Mikloušić is kept as HR-ZaNSK R 4572.

The "Gorski Kotar Bike Tour", held annually since 2012, sometimes goes through Homer, such as in the first leg for 2022 and the first leg for 2023.

== Demographics ==
Village of Homer: Population trends 1857–2021
v

population	350	274	243	299	263	292	264	290	261	837	399	353	359	330	290	272	225
	1857	1869	1880	1890	1900	1910	1921	1931	1948	1953	1961	1971	1981	1991	2001	2011	2021

Sources: Croatian Bureau of Statistics publications

== Bibliography ==
- Trgo, Fabijan, ed. (1964). Zbornik dokumenata i podataka o Narodno-oslobodilačkom ratu Jugoslovenskih naroda. Vol. V, 32.
