= Homelands (festival) =

British electronic dance music festival

Coordinates: 51.0495°N 1.2465°W

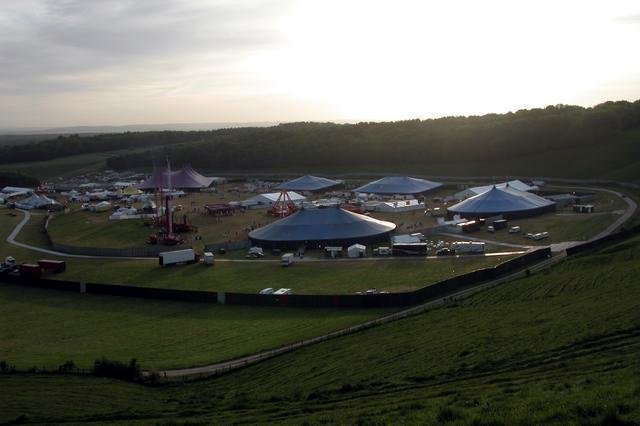
- Genre: Electronic dance music
- Dates: 1999 – 2005
- Locations: England Matterley Bowl nr Winchester, Hampshire Scotland Royal Highland Showground nr Edinburgh New Cumnock, East Ayrshire Ireland Butlin's Mosney, County Meath
- Founders: Mean Fiddler Music Group
- Capacity: 50,000

Homelands was an electronic dance music festival held near Winchester, Hampshire between 1999 and 2005, with spin-off editions at locations in Scotland and Ireland. The festival was run by Mean Fiddler Music Group, and the owners of the Home nightclub chain.

The festival was held at Cheesefoot Head near Winchester, Hampshire, and was one of the most popular British festivals of this genre. The land was previously the site of Creamfields in 1998, and Boomtown from 2010.

Homelands Scotland was held in Royal Highland Showground near Edinburgh from 1999. The festival moved to New Cumnock in the south of Scotland, for its final year in 2001.

Between 1999 and 2000, Homelands Ireland was held at the Butlin's Mosney in County Meath.

== Yearly editions ==
=== 1999 ===
The 1999 festival took place on 29 and 30 May 1999, at Cheesefoot Head on the Matterley Estate near Winchester, Hampshire – the site of Creamfields the previous year. The festival also saw the first public screening of Human Traffic.

There were nine themed arenas, as follows. There are a few acts [Roni Size, Basement Jaxx, Jungle Brothers] that I cannot recall where they performed. (Edit to add Roni Size performed on The End 02, Basement Jaxx on Mixmag Arena and Jungle Brothers on Home Arena)

The Home Arena – had the first live Chemical Brothers plus Asian Dub Foundation, Monkey Mafia, Paul Oakenfold, Fatboy Slim, DJ Shadow and Paul Van Dyke.

The MixMag Arena – had a live set from Underworld, plus Faithless, Red Snapper, Dope Smugglaz, DJs Carl Cox, Deep Dish, Gilles Peterson and Darren Price.

The Essential Mix Arena – featuring Radio 1 DJs Pete Tong, plus Paul Oakenfold, Sasha & John Digweed. Radio 1 did a live broadcast from this tent featuring Judge Jules, Danny Rampling and a 4-hour Essential Mix.

The End – hosted by the London club – had two arenas.

The End 01 – a deep house tent, featuring Terry Francis and The End Sound System (Mr C, Layo and Mathew B) plus Darren Emerson, Dave Angel, Stacey Pullen, Laurent Garnier and Carl Cox.

The End 02 – a drum’n’bass arena with DJ Hype, Andy C, Krust, Bryan Gee, Fabio & Grooverider.

Slinky - Bournemouth's "superclub"

US house club Lyall - featuring New York DJ Danny Tenaglia playing a 10-hour set

There were also two arenas hosted by alcohol sponsors

=== 2000 ===
The 2000 festival took place on a very wet Saturday 27 May 2000. The line included BT, Moby, Public Enemy and Leftfield.

==== Tents ====
===== Ericsson @ Home Arena =====
Leftfield
Ian Brown
Moby
Public Enemy
BT
Paul Oakenfold
Armand Van Helden
Paul Van Dyk
Scratch Perverts
David Holmes
Dope Smugglaz
Dave Seaman
Meeker
Jeremy Healy
Johnny Moy
Adam Freeland
Dan & Jon Kahuna
Jason Bye
Alfie Costa
Manchild

===== Radio 1 Essential Mix Arena =====
Pete Tong
Sasha
John Digweed
Nick Warren
Lee Burridge
Craig Richards
Parks & Wilson
Col Hamilton
Stewart Rowell
Alex Taylor

===== Slinky & MTV Dancefloor Chart Show Arena =====
Judge Jules
Paul Van Dyk
Brandon Block
Alex P
Graham Gold
Hybrid feat. Chrissie Hynde
Ferry Corsten
Luke Neville
Lisa Lashes
Garry White
Tim Lyall
Gordon Kaye
Guy Ornadel

===== Subterrain & Ultimate Base Arena =====
Carl Cox
Sven Vath
Mr. C
Darren Emerson
Layo & Bushwacka!
DJ Sneak
Jim Masters
Trevor Rockcliffe

===== The End's Drum & Bass Arena =====
Reprazent
Fabio
Grooverider
Andy C.
Ed Rush
Optical
DJ Hype
Razor
Zinc
Pascall
Randall
MCs Fats, Dynamite, Moose & Rage

===== Back2Basics/Deep South/Highrise Arena =====
Romanthony
Danny Rampling
Jon Carter
Justin Robertson
Junior Sanchez
Steve Lawler
Ralph Lawson
Adam Freeland
Jacques Lu Cont
Rebel Crew (Scott & Robbie Hardkiss)
Tayo
Jenga Heads
James Holroyd

===== Ministry House Party =====
Darren Emerson
Davie Reid
Nick Warren
Danny Howells
Lottie
Gareth Cooke
Yousef
Future Shock
Bent
Barry Ashworth

===== Ericsson MYH Arena =====
Robert Owens
Juan Atkins
Kevin Saunderson
Sister Bliss
Groove Armada (DJ set)
L.E. Bass
Evil Eddie Richards
Dave Mothersole
T Joy
Richard Grey
J Jeff
DJ Vee

===== Bud Ice Bus =====
Richard Fearless
Norman Jay
Jon Carter
Bob Jones & Justin Robertson
Tim Carbutt (Utah Saints)
Jools Butterfield
J. Swinscoe & Tom Chant
Robin Lurie (percussion)

===== Bacardi B-Bar =====
Gilles Peterson
Faze Action
Patrick Forge
Ross Allen
Stuart Patterson

===== Radio 1 Outdoor Sound Stage =====
Judge Jules
Danny Rampling
Seb Fontaine
Dave Pearce
Daniel Bailey

=== 2005 ===
Officially called "We Love... Homelands" it took place on 28 May 2005 from 1pm to 5am, and had a capacity of 50,000. Headliners included The Streets, Beck, Roots Manuva, Mylo, The Bravery, Audio Bullys, Babyshambles, John Digweed and Dimitri from Paris. Medicine 8 performed in the festival's 'Strongbow Rooms'.

== See also ==
- List of electronic music festivals
- List of music festivals in the United Kingdom
- Workers Beer Company
