= Lazac Lokvarski =

- Village
- Interactive map of Lazac Lokvarski
- Location within Croatia
- Coordinates: 45.379°N 14.730°E
- Country: Croatia
- County: Primorje-Gorski Kotar County
- City: Lokve

Area
  - Total: 2.1 km^{2} (0.81 sq mi)

Population (2021)
  - Total: 18
  - Density: 8.6/km^{2} (22/sq mi)
- Time zone: UTC+1 (CET)
  - Summer (DST): UTC+2 (CEST)
- Postal code: 51300 Delnice

Lazac Lokvarski is a village in Croatia, in the Lokve municipality, in Primorje-Gorski Kotar County.

== Sports ==
The "Gorski Kotar Bike Tour", held annually since 2012, sometimes goes through Lazac, such as in the first leg for 2023.

== Demographics ==
Village of Lazac Lokvarski: Population trends 1857–2021
v

population			13	9	7	12	16	5		24	45	45	22	34	22	18	18
	1857	1869	1880	1890	1900	1910	1921	1931	1948	1953	1961	1971	1981	1991	2001	2011	2021

Note:"Lazac" until 1900. A dio naselja between 1880 and 1848. Sources: Croatian Bureau of Statistics publications
