= Lim Young-woong discography =

Singer discography

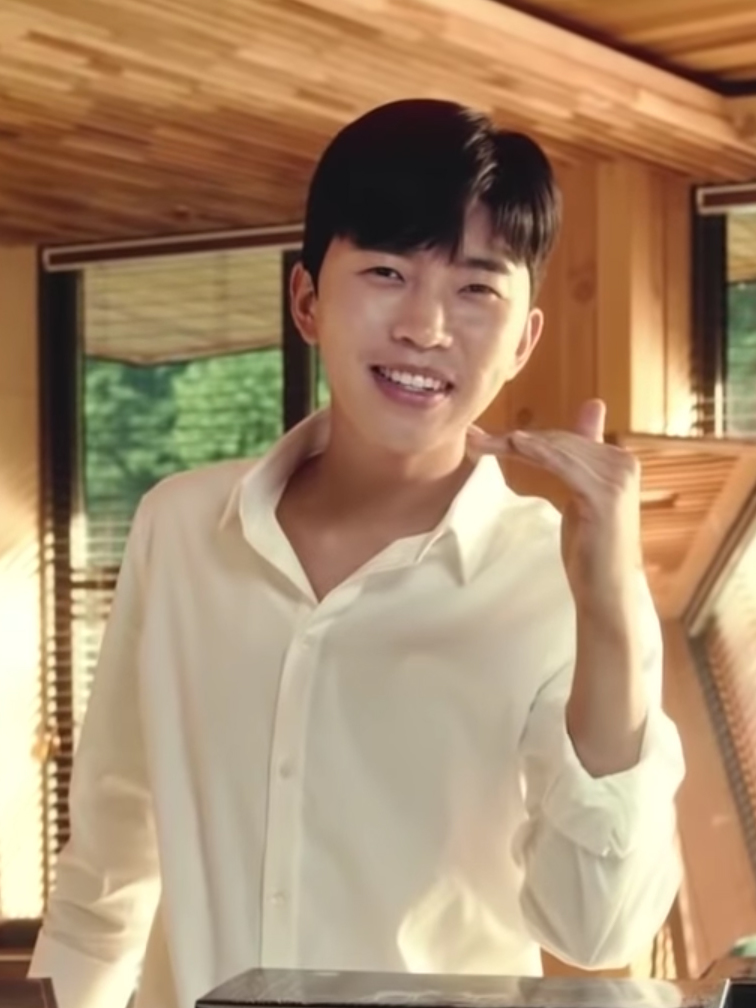
- Lim in 2020
- Studio albums: 3
- Soundtrack albums: 1
- Singles: 19
- Music videos: 13
- Other charted songs: 22
- Collaborative albums: 1

This is the discography of the South Korean singer Lim Young-woong. He has released two studio albums, one collaboration extended play (EP), sixteen singles as a lead artist, and one promotional single.

== Albums ==
=== Studio albums ===
List of studio albums, with selected details, chart positions and sales
Title	Album details	Peak chart positions	Sales
Title	Album details	KOR	Sales
Im Hero	Released: May 2, 2022; Label: Mulgogi Music, Dreamus; Formats: CD, digital download, streaming	1	KOR: 1,149,643
Im Hero 2	Released: August 29, 2025; Label: Mulgogi Music, Kakao Entertainment; Formats: Digital download, streaming	—	—N/a
Im Hero 10	Released: September 8, 2026; Label: Mulgogi Music, Kakao Entertainment; Formats: Digital download, streaming	—	—N/a

=== Collaborative albums ===
List of collaborative albums, with selected details
Title	Album details
Newness of Trot (트로트의 신) (with Park Seo-jin)	Released: December 21, 2018; Label: Starone Entertainment, Ogam Entertainment (Note: Newness of Trot was digitally released under a label named Ogam Entertainment on May 4, 2020.); Formats: CD, DVD, USB, (Note: On June 12, 2019, Newness of Trot was released on a USB flash drive, featuring additional tracks recorded by fellow trot singers Park Ku-yoon and Jiwoni.) digital download, streaming

== Singles ==
List of singles, with selected chart positions, showing year released and album name
Title	Year	Peak chart positions			Certifications	Album
Title	Year	KOR	KOR Bill. (Note: Includes the South Korea Songs chart (launched on May 7, 2022 and discontinued since January 18, 2025), and the Billboard Korea Hot 100 (launched on December 6, 2025).)	WW Excl. US	Certifications	Album
"Hate You" (미워요) (Note: Miwoyo)	2016	159	—	—		Non-album singles
"What's So Important?" (뭣이 중헌디) (Note: Mwosi Jungheondi)	2017	183	—	—		Non-album singles
"Elevator" (엘리베이터) (Note: Ellibeiteo)	2018	—	—	—		Non-album singles
"Not by Stairs, but by Elevator" (계단 말고 엘리베이터) (Note: Gyedan Malgo Ellibeiteo)	2018	133	—	—		Non-album singles
"Trust in Me" (이제 나만 믿어요) (Note: Ije Naman Mideoyo)	2020	11	13	—	KMCA: 2× Platinum (Note: Certification for streaming)	Mr. Trot
"Trust in Me" (이제 나만 믿어요) (Note: Ije Naman Mideoyo) (Piano by Cho Young-soo)	2020	181	—	—		Mr. Trot
"My Starry Love" (별빛 같은 나의 사랑아) (Note: Byeolbit Gateun Naeui Sarang-a lit. "My Love like Starlight")	2021	1	—	—		Im Hero
"Our Blues, Our Life" (우리들의 블루스)	2022	1	8	—	KMCA: Platinum (Note: Certification for streaming)	Im Hero
"If We Ever Meet Again" (다시 만날 수 있을까)	2022	1	9	—	KMCA: Platinum (Note: Certification for streaming)	Im Hero
"London Boy"	2022	2	8	—		Im Hero 2
"Polaroid"	2022	3	11	—		Im Hero 2
"Grain of Sand" (모래 알갱이)	2023	1	2	102		Im Hero 2
"Do or Die"	2023	1	1	87		Im Hero 2
"Home"	2024	2	4	—		Im Hero 2
"Warmth" (온기)	2024	1	2	161		Im Hero 2
"Heavenly Ever After" (천국보다 아름다운)	2025	1	18	169		Im Hero 2
"Eternal Moment" (순간을 영원처럼)	2025	5	2	191		Im Hero 2
"ToTo" (또또)	2026	1	—	159		Im Hero 10
"—" denotes releases that did not chart or were not released in that region.

== Promotional singles ==
List of promotional singles, with selected chart positions, showing year released and album name
Title	Year	Peak chart positions	Album
Title	Year	KOR	Album
"Hero" (Note: "Hero" was used in commercials for the SUV brand SsangYong Rexton.)	2020	7	Non-album single

== Soundtrack appearances ==
List of songs, with selected chart positions, showing year released and album name
Title	Year	Peak chart positions		Certifications	Album
Title	Year	KOR	KOR Hot	Certifications	Album
"Love Always Runs Away" (사랑은 늘 도망가) (Note: Sarang-eun Neul Domang-ga) (Lee Moon-sae cover)	2021	1	6	KMCA: 2× Platinum (Note: Certification for streaming)	Young Lady and Gentleman OST

== Other charted songs ==
List of songs, with selected chart positions, showing year released and album name
Title	Year	Peak chart positions		Album
Title	Year	KOR	KOR Bill.	Album
"Rain Shower" (소나기) (Note: Sonagi)	2016	165	—	Non-album songs
"Fill It Up" (따라따라) (Note: Ttara-ttara)	2017	161	—	Non-album songs
"Rainbow" (무지개)	2022	8	12	Im Hero
"Lovely Touch" (손이 참 곱던 그대)	2022	19	24	Im Hero
"Father" (아버지)	2022	15	14	Im Hero
"A bientot"	2022	21	17	Im Hero
"Love Station" (사랑역)	2022	25	—	Im Hero
"Nest" (보금자리)	2022	28	—	Im Hero
"I Love You" (사랑해 진짜)	2022	16	—	Im Hero
"Love Letter" (연애편지)	2022	23	19	Im Hero
"Loving You" (사랑해요 그대를)	2022	26	—	Im Hero
"A Psalm of Life" (인생찬가)	2022	24	15	Im Hero
"Unread Message" (답장을 보낸지)	2025	19	12	Im Hero 2
"Ulssigu"	2025	22	12	Im Hero 2
"Wild Flower" (들꽃이 될게요)	2025	20	8	Im Hero 2
"Left in the Rain" (비가 와서)	2025	21	10	Im Hero 2
"Wonderful Life"	2025	25	15	Im Hero 2
"Melody for You" (그댈 위한 멜로디)	2025	24	9	Im Hero 2
"Don't Look Back at Me" (돌아보지 마세요)	2025	28	17	Im Hero 2
"I'm Sorry, But..." (알겠어요 미안해요)	2025	26	16	Im Hero 2
"I'm Hero" (나는야 Hero)	2025	27	19	Im Hero 2
"A Song for Us" (우리에게 안녕)	2025	30	10	Im Hero 2
"Moise" (모이세)	2026	24	—	Im Hero 10
"Baila"	2026	15	—	Im Hero 10
"Please Be Happy" (부디 행복해질 것)	2026	22	—	Im Hero 10
"I Hate You RE" (미워요 RE)	2026	29	—	Im Hero 10
"Grain of Sand RE" (모래 알갱이 RE)	2026	33	—	Im Hero 10
"Love Always Runs Away RE" (사랑은 늘 도망가 RE)	2026	34	—	Im Hero 10
"A bientot RE"	2026	36	—	Im Hero 10
"For Us" (살아온 우리에게)	2026	28	—	Im Hero 10
"New York"	2026	30	—	Im Hero 10
"—" denotes releases that did not chart or were not released in that region.

=== Mr. Trot-related songs ===
List of songs, with selected chart positions, showing year released and album name
Title	Year	Peak chart positions	Album
Title	Year	KOR	Album
"Hope" (바램) (Note: Baraem) (Noh Sa-yeon cover)	2020	78	Best of Mr. Trot Preliminary
"Single-Minded Dandelion" (일편단심 민들레야) (Note: Ilpyeondansim Mindeulleya) (Cho Yong-pil cover)	2020	155	Mr. Trot Death Match Part 2
"The Story of an Old Couple in Their 60s" (어느 60대 노부부 이야기) (Note: Eoneu Yuksipdae Nobubu Iyagi) (Kim Kwang-seok version cover) (Note: "The Story of an Old Couple in Their 60s" was originally released by singer-songwriter Kim Mok-kyung in 1990. The song was popularized by Kim Kwang-seok after his cover was released five years later.)	2020	65	Best of Mr. Trot Trot-Aid
"Purple-Colored Postcard" (보라빛 엽서) (Note: Borabit Yeopseo) (Seol Woon-do cover)	2020	93	Best of Mr. Trot Legend Mission
"Crying and Regretting" (울면서 후회하네) (Note: Ulmyeonseo Huhoehane) (with Kim Soo-chan; Joo Hyun-mi cover)	2020	165	Best of Mr. Trot Legend Mission
"The Traitor" (배신자) (Note: Baesinja) (Do Sung cover)	2020	107	Best of Mr. Trot Final
"Two Fists" (두 주먹) (Note: Du Jumeok)	2020	136	Best of Mr. Trot Final
"A Magic Lily" (상사화) (Note: Sangsahwa) (Ahn Ye-eun cover)	2020	196	Romantic Call Centre Part 3
"An Old Song" (오래된 노래) (Note: Oraedoen Norae) (Standing Egg cover)	2020	101	Romantic Call Centre Part 19
"Some Day" (어느 날 문득) (Note: Eoneu Nal Mundeuk lit. "One Day Suddenly") (Jung Su-ra cover)	2020	124	Romantic Call Centre Part 27
"Walking Along" (걷고 싶다) (Note: Geotgo Sipda lit. "I Want to Walk") (Cho Yong-pil cover)	2021	86	Romantic Call Centre Part 39
"Whoo" (후) (Jo Hang-jo cover)	2021	121	Romantic Call Centre Part 44
"Q" (Cho Yong-pil cover)	2021	179	Romantic Call Centre Part 49
"Stand-Up Bar" (목로주점) (Note: Mokrojujeom) (Lee Yeon-sil cover)	2021	184	Romantic Call Centre Part 50
"If I Love Again" (다시 사랑한다면) (Note: Dasi Sarang-handamyeon) (Kim Feel version cover)	2021	77	Romantic Call Centre Part 56
"BK Love" (MC Sniper cover)	2021	106	Ppongsoongah School Part 23
"Did You Forget?" (잊었니) (Note: Ijeotni) (Lee Seung-chul cover)	2021	91	Romantic Call Centre Part 60
"Last Love" (끝사랑) (Note: Kkeut-sarang) (Kim Bum-soo cover)	2021	95	Romantic Call Centre Part 61
"Amazing You" (그대라는 사치) (Note: Geudae-raneun Sachi) (Han Dong-geun cover)	2021	81	Romantic Call Centre Part 62
"Overcoming the Pain of Love" (사랑의 아픔 딛고) (Note: Sarang-eui Apeum Ditgo) (Lee Gwang-ryong cover)	2021	174	Romantic Call Centre Part 65

== Music videos ==
Title	Year	Director(s)	Ref.
"Trust in Me" (Piano by Cho Young-soo)	2020	Maeil Dairies	
"Hero"	2020	Unknown	
"My Starry Love"	2021	Kim Ho-bin	
"Polaroid"	2022	Unknown	
"London Boy"	2022	Unknown	
