= Homing =

Homing may refer to:

== Guidance ==
- Guidance system, a device or group of devices used to navigate a ship, aircraft, missile, rocket, satellite, or other craft
  - Homing (missile guidance)
    - Infrared homing, a passive missile guidance system which uses the emission from a target of infrared electromagnetic radiation
    - Semi-active radar homing, a common type of missile guidance system for longer-range air-to-air and surface-to-air missile systems
    - Active radar homing, a missile guidance method in which a guided missile uses a radar transceiver to find and track its target autonomously
    - Homing torpedo, "fire and forget" torpedoes can use passive or active guidance
- Acoustic homing, a system which uses sound to guide a moving object
- Homing (biology), the inherent ability of an animal to navigate towards an original location through unfamiliar areas
  - Homing pigeon, a variety of domestic pigeon bred to find its way home over extremely long distances
- Homing beacon, sometimes homer, a beacon that transmits a signal to be homed on

== Other uses ==
- Homing (hematopoietic), a process of cellular migration
- Homing endonuclease, a type of enzyme
- Homing (horse), a racehorse
- Homing (mechanical), moving a mechanical system to a reference position
- Multiple homing, two types of telephone connections of a terminal facility

== See also ==
- Bird migration
- Distress radiobeacon
- Honing (disambiguation)
