= Snake River Conspiracy discography =

- Snake River Conspiracy in 2006
- Studio albums: 1
- EPs: 2
- Singles: 4
- B-sides: 3
- Music videos: 3
- Promotional releases: 3
- Unreleased albums: 2
- Unreleased songs: 12

The discography of the American industrial rock band Snake River Conspiracy consists of one studio album, two extended plays, four singles, three B-sides, three promotional releases, three music videos and twelve unreleased songs.

== Albums ==
=== Studio albums ===
Title	Details	Peak chart positions
Title	Details	US Heat.
Sonic Jihad	Released: July 11, 2000; Label: Reprise Records/Morpheus; Formats: CD, CS	36

=== Unreleased albums ===
Title	Details
SRC2	Released: Unreleased; Tentative Release: 2006–2007; Label: Five Knuckle Bullet (5-K-B) Records
B-Sides and Bullshit	Released: Unreleased; Tentative Release: 2014–2015; Label: N/A

== Extended plays ==
Title	Album details	Peak chart positions
Title	Album details	UK
Vulcan	Released: October 5, 1999; Label: Reprise	—
Smells Like Teen Punk Meat	Released: July 31, 2000; Label: Morpheus	149

== Singles ==
Title	Year	Peak chart positions			Album
Title	Year	US Dance	US Mod. Rock	UK	Album
"Vulcan"	1999	— (Note: While it did not make an appearance on the Dance Club Songs chart, "Vulcan" reached number 37 on the Hot Dance Music Maxi Singles Sales chart.)	—	—	Sonic Jihad
"How Soon Is Now?"	2000	15	38	—	Sonic Jihad
"Breed"	2000	37	—	—	Sonic Jihad
"How Soon Is Now?" (UK reissue)	2001	—	—	83	Sonic Jihad

== Music videos ==
Year	Title	Director	Album
1999	"Vulcan"	Christian Forte	Sonic Jihad
2000	"How Soon Is Now?"	Gregory Dark	Sonic Jihad
2003	"Hide"	Bobby Hewitt and Fab Fernandez	SRC2

== Promotional releases ==
=== Samplers ===
Title	Album details
Sampler	Released: 2000; Label: Reprise; Format: CD
Pre-Fatty Tinge	Released: 2000; Label: Reprise; Format: CS

=== Promotional singles ===
Title	Year	Album
"Oh Well"	2000	Sonic Jihad

== B-sides ==
Title	Year	Album
"She Said She Said"	1999	Vulcan EP
"Coke & Vaseline"	1999	Vulcan EP
"Homicide"	2000	Smells Like Teen Punk Meat

== Unreleased songs ==
These songs were derived from the band's unreleased second album, SRC2.

Song	Time	Writer(s)	Other information
"Absinthe"	4:34	Eric Hendrikx & Tobey Torres	
"Art of War"	3:44		leaked
"Automatic"	3:59		has a "Ruff" remix (3:48)
"Dollar At A Time"	3:09		
"Drug Tongue"	4:13 / 3:56		Martina Axen and Tobey Torres have recorded versions differing in length
"Dying"	4:27	Jason Slater & Geoff Tyson	has a "Ruff" remix (4:27) and lyrics have been leaked Martina Axen and Tobey Torres have recorded versions differing in length
"Hide"	3:31	Slater, Troy Van Leeuwen & Eddie Nappi	originally titled "Shut Up"
"Methlehem"	3:39		has a "Ruff" remix
"Not Long (of This World)"	3:56		
"Strung Out & Crazy"	4:21		Martina Axen and Tobey Torres have recorded versions differing in length
"Won't Go Quietly"	2:47	Geoff Tyson	
"Throw It All Away"	n/a	Slater, Mitchell Doran & Tobey Torres	
