= Smells Like Teen Punk Meat =

Single by Snake River Conspiracy

from the album Sonic Jihad
- B-side: "Breed (Loadblower mix)"
- Released: July 31, 2000
- Genre: Industrial metal; industrial rock; electronic rock
- Length: 8:54 (7"); 12:10 (CD)
- Label: Morpheus
- Producer(s): Jason Slater; David Kahne; Eric Valentine

Snake River Conspiracy singles chronology
"How Soon Is Now?" (2000)	"Smells Like Teen Punk Meat" (2000)	"Breed" (2001)

Snake River Conspiracy chronology
Sonic Jihad (2000)	Smells Like Teen Punk Meat (2000)

Professional ratings
Review scores
Source	Rating
Kerrang!	5/5 stars

Smells Like Teen Punk Meat is the third single and second extended play by American industrial rock band Snake River Conspiracy, released exclusively in the United Kingdom on July 31, 2000, by Morpheus Records.

The single's A-side is "Somebody Hates You", from the band's debut album Sonic Jihad, and its B-side is a remix of "Breed" by Loadblower. The CD version of Smells Like Teen Punk Meat contains a new song, "Homicide", as well as an uncensored, enhanced CD video of "Vulcan".

Although Smells Like Teen Punk Meat was marketed as an extended play, it is generally classified as a single under Official Charts Company (OCC) rules.

Smells Like Teen Punk Meat was named "Single of the Week" by British music magazine Kerrang!.

== Track listing ==
7" single (morph-008 ep)
No.	Title	Writer(s)	Producer(s)	Length
1.	"Somebody Hates You"	Slater; Valentine; Porter; David Kahne	Jason Slater; Eric Valentine; David Kahne	4:16
2.	"Breed" (Loadblower mix)	Jason Slater; Eric Valentine; Denny Porter; Tobey Torres; Jerry Goldsmith	Slater; Valentine; Kahne	4:38
Total length:				8:54

Enhanced CD bonus tracks (morph-008 cd)
No.	Title	Writer(s)	Producer(s)	Length
3.	"Homicide"	Slater; Sean James; Geoff Tyson	Slater; Kahne	3:16
4.	"Vulcan" (Enhanced CD video/uncensored)	Slater; Valentine	Slater; Valentine
Total length:				12:10

== Personnel ==
Personnel per liner notes.

Snake River Conspiracy

- Jason Slater – bass, guitar, instruments, production, mixing, songwriting (all tracks), remixing (2)
- Tobey Torres – lyrical contributions (uncredited), vocals

Production

- Eric Valentine – production, mixing, song writing (1, 2)
- David Kahne – production, mixing orchestral arrangements, songwriting
- Geoff Tyson – engineering (2,3), remixing (2), songwriting (3)
- Krish Sharma – mixing (1)
- Brian Gardener – mastering
- Loadblower – remixing (2)

Artwork

- Michael Kahne – art direction, design, illustrations

== Charts ==
Chart (2000)	Peak position
UK Singles Chart (OCC)	149
