= Summer Girl =

Studio album by Smash Mouth
- Released: September 19, 2006
- Genre: Alternative rock
- Length: 31:21
- Label: Beautiful Bomb Records
- Producers: Michael Urbano; Jeffrey Saltzman; Greg Camp; Eric Valentine; Paul De Lisle; Michael Perfitt

Smash Mouth chronology
The Gift of Rock (2005)	Summer Girl (2006)	Magic (2012)

Singles from Summer Girl
- 1. "Story of My Life" Released: 2006; 2. "So Insane" Released: 2006; 3. "Getaway Car" Released: 2006

Professional ratings
Review scores
Source	Rating
AllMusic	4/5 stars

Summer Girl is the sixth studio album by American rock band Smash Mouth. It was released on September 19, 2006 by Beautiful Bomb Records. This is the last album featuring original guitarist and songwriter Greg Camp.

== Release ==
The album was released with the promo single "Story of My Life". It was accompanied by a music video used in the sixth season of the VH1 reality show The Surreal Life, featuring all the housemates from that season, like Florence Henderson, Alexis Arquette, Tawny Kitaen, C.C. DeVille and others. The song has been used in promotion of Shrek the Third. This is the third instance of a Smash Mouth song being used in some fashion for the Shrek film series. "All Star" and a cover of The Monkees song "I'm a Believer" were both used in the first Shrek film.

"So Insane" was featured as the opening theme to the 2006 film Zoom. An instrumental version of "So Insane" was also used in the opening of the infamous ABC series Cavemen, in its unaired pilot. "Everyday Superhero" was used on the soundtrack of The Pacifier and Zoom. It was used to advertise the CBS sitcom, The King of Queens, when the show entered its final season. It was also heard in an America's Funniest Home Videos blooper compilation.

As of 2026, the album is not available on any music streaming services.

== Track listing ==
All tracks are written by Greg Camp, except where noted.

No.	Title	Writer(s)	Length
1.	"The Crawl"		3:20
2.	"Everyday Superhero"	Steve Harwell, Matthew Gerrard, Robbie Nevil	3:28
3.	"So Insane"	Camp, Paul De Lisle	2:55
4.	"Girl Like You"	De Lisle	2:22
5.	"Getaway Car"		2:40
6.	"Story of My Life"	Harwell, Gerrard, Nevil	3:21
7.	"Right Side, Wrong Bed"		3:13
8.	"Summer Girl"		2:28
9.	"Hey L.A."		2:29
10.	"Quality Control"		3:17
11.	"Beautiful Bomb"		1:49
Total length:			31:21

== Credits ==
=== Smash Mouth ===
- Steve Harwell – lead vocals, piano, keyboards
- Greg Camp – guitars, backing vocals
- Paul De Lisle – bass, backing vocals
- Jason Sutter – drums (3, 4, 7)
- Michael Urbano – drums (1, 2, 5, 6, 8–11)

=== Additional musicians ===
- Michael Klooster – keyboards; melodica (7)
- RV (Hervé Salters) – keyboards (1, 5)
- Mark Cervantes – percussion
- Leslie Lala Damage Stevens – backing vocals (5)
- Moushumi Motor Wilson – backing vocals (5)

=== Production ===
- Michael Urbano – producer (1, 2, 5, 8–11)
- Jeff Saltzman – producer (1, 5, 8–11)
- Matthew Gerrard – lead vocal producer (2, 6)
- Michael Perfitt – additional production (2)
- Greg Camp – producer (tracks 3, 4, 7)
- Eric Valentine – producer (3, 6, 7), drum producer (4), lead vocal producer (10)
- Paul De Lisle – producer (4)
- Karen Sundell – product manager
- Kelly Castro – art direction, photography, design
- Robert Hayes – management

=== Technical ===
- Chris Bellman – mastering at Bernie Grundman Mastering (Hollywood, California)
- Marco Martin – engineer (1, 5, 8–11)
- Michael Perfitt – mixing (1, 5, 8–11), engineer (2)
- Eric Valentine – mixing (2, 3, 6, 7), engineer (3, 6, 7)
- Greg Camp – engineer (4)
- Chris Roach – engineer (4), assistant engineer
- Chris Dugan – mixing (4)
- Steve Beacham – assistant engineer
- Mikael Johnston – assistant engineer

== Charts ==
=== Singles ===
Year	Song	US Adult
2006	"Story of My Life"	29
2006	"So Insane"	25
