= Revenge of the Triads =

American supergroup

- Also known as: The Triad
- Origin: Los Angeles, California, U.S.
- Years active: 2001–2002
- Labels: LMC Records; MCA
- Past members: Charlie Clouser; Jason Slater; Troy Van Leeuwen

Revenge of the Triads (R.O.T.T.) was a short-lived musical project/supergroup from Los Angeles, California. The band was formed in December 2001 by Charlie Clouser, Jason Slater and Troy Van Leeuwen. Almost one year after forming, the band broke up due to conflicts with their record label and the members collectively losing interest in the project. Revenge of the Triads never released any material during their existence, and their debut album remains unfinished and unreleased.

== History ==
=== Formation ===
Revenge of the Triads was formed by former Nine Inch Nails collaborator Charlie Clouser and Jason Slater, bassist/producer for the industrial rock band Snake River Conspiracy. Slater, who was interested in collaborating with Clouser, had been connected with him through a mutual friend, and resulted in Clouser helping produce the song "Oh Well" for Snake River Conspiracy's debut album Sonic Jihad (2000). Troy Van Leeuwen, whom Slater had become friends with after Snake River Conspiracy toured as supporting act for A Perfect Circle in 2001, was also brought into the fold.

The formation of Revenge of the Triads was announced on December 18, 2001. It was also announced that Revenge of the Triads had signed to an undisclosed label, which in March 2002 was revealed to be LMC Records, a San Diego–based independent record label which had recently inked a three-year distribution deal with MCA Records.

=== Recording of debut album ===
"We're trying to push the envelope and not do anything stale. I don't want to put a genre on it. It's like Charlie, Jason and I were all put into a washing machine and we're in the spin cycle right now. Charlie's got that dark NIN vibe; Jason's pretty handsy with a sampler himself and he's also a metalhead; and I just do my thing over what they do."

–Troy Van Leeuwen, 2002

The band's debut album was produced on Pro Tools and was collectively contributed to by all three band members; each of the band's members would produce an instrumental part, which they would then share between each other by passing around hard drives. Clouser stated that there were also two or three different drummers and three or four other singers involved in the album, as well as Clouser playing some drums, bass and guitar on the record.

On May 3, 2002, Slater reported that the album was "a month or two" away from completion, and that the album would be released when the record label saw fit. Amidst production of the record, Troy Van Leeuwen and Jason Slater took some time out to work on Enemy and Snake River Conspiracy, respectively. The album was estimated for release at the end of 2002, but was later pushed back. Work on the album was further stalled after Van Leeuwen was asked to join Queens of the Stone Age. By the end of the band's existence, Revenge of the Triads had recorded at least six songs for their debut album, one of which featured contributions from Eddie Nappi, formerly the bassist of Handsome.

=== Breakup ===
On December 16, 2002, Jason Slater announced that Revenge of the Triads had officially disbanded. Slater stated that the band's breakup occurred after progress on their debut album stalled, due to LMC not paying the band their promised advance payments, after which the band's members focused on other projects and collectively lost interest in Revenge of the Triads entirely. However, he maintained that the split was ultimately amicable between all of the bandmembers, and viewed the experience positively. "I was having a shit year and hanging out with Troy and working on music got me through it. And Charlie ended up being a good friend, so in the end it was still a good experience. It would have been nice to finish [the album], though."

Slater later uploaded an unfinished Revenge of the Triads song, "Serve", to his website.

== Band members ==
Revenge of the Triads

- Charlie Clouser – keyboards, drums, bass, guitar, production
- Jason Slater – bass guitar, production (died 2020)
- Troy Van Leeuwen – guitar, production, vocals

Contributors

- Eddie Nappi

== See also ==
- Tapeworm, another supergroup involving Clouser
