= Better with Time =

Better with Time may refer to:

- "Better with Time", a single from the album Lotusflow3r (2009) by Prince
- "Better with Time", a song from the 2012 album Magic by Smash Mouth
- "Better with Time", a song and EP (2015) by Grabbitz

== See also ==
- "Better in Time", a single from the album Spirit (2007) by Leona Lewis
