= Stimulator (band) =

American rock band

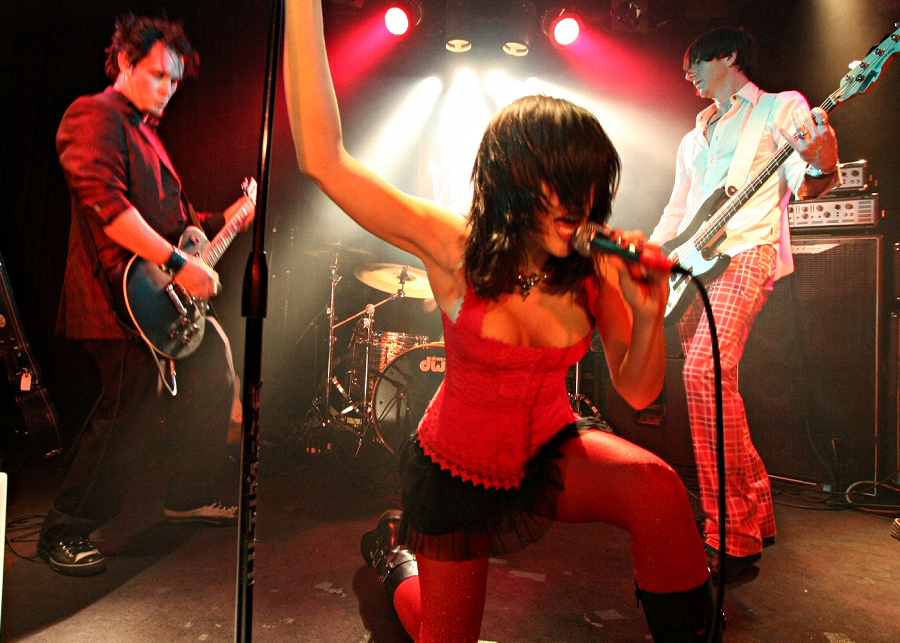
- Stimulator at the Viper Room in West Hollywood, California, 2010

Background information
- Origin: Los Angeles, California, U.S.
- Genres: New wave, disco, dark wave
- Years active: 2003–present
- Labels: The Orchard Records
- Members: Susan Hyatt; Geoff Tyson; Chad Stewart; Sean Tichenor; Michael Brent Birnholz
- Website: stimulatortheband.com

Stimulator is an alternative rock band based in Los Angeles, California. It was founded in 2002 by singer/songwriter Susan Hyatt (formerly of Pillbox) and guitarist Geoff Tyson (formerly of T-Ride and Snake River Conspiracy). The band's songs have been featured in the Miramax film Ella Enchanted, MTV's The Real World and episodes of the E! Network's 50 Hottest Hollywood Hookups. Stimulator has toured the United States supporting Duran Duran, The Go-Go's, and were featured performers on the Van's Warped Tour.

From 2010 to 2011, the band's cover of Olivia Newton-John's "Magic" was featured in Macy's nationwide television and radio "Find Your Magic" commercials.

== History ==
In 2002, Hyatt and Tyson founded the band in Los Angeles. Joined by drummer Chad Stewart (Faster Pussycat, Gilby Clarke, Motochrist, LA Guns) and bassist Sean Tichenor (formerly of King Black Acid and James Angell), Stimulator's early electronic sound, with its emphasis on 1980s-style new wave keyboards, was reminiscent of the band Garbage.

Stimulator's debut album was licensed to the LAB/Universal Records in 2005. The cover art was designed by Duran Duran's John Taylor and designer Patty Palazzo.

In 2004, music promoter Kevin Lyman handpicked the band to play the Warped Tour after hearing that their song "On Top of the World" had won Best Rock Song in the 2004 John Lennon Songwriting Contest.

In 2004, Stimulator toured in support of Missing Persons and, in 2005, in support of Berlin.

In 2005, Stimulator was the opening act on Duran Duran's Astronaut tour.

In 2006, Stimulator toured as the opening act on The Go-Go's celebrated reunion tour.

Album cover for Stimulator's debut album, co-designed by Duran Duran's John Taylor and designer Patty Palazzo.

In 2007, Tyson left the band and the new sound for Stimulator emerged: a mix of classic disco, easy listening California melodies, and Europop. This

was the sound for Stimulator's second album, Stimulator 2.

In 2010, Tyson and Stimulator reunited when Stimulator's cover of "Magic" became the theme song for Macy's national television and radio commercials. The commercial ran for almost two years.

Also in 2010, Stimulator released its third CD, Lovelier in Black, which took a more dark wave musical direction. For this album, Michael Birnholz (formerly of Phantasm) replaced Tichenor on bass.

The band's songs have been licensed to television shows such as NBC's Las Vegas, MTV's The Real World, ABC's Body of Proof, and The Walt Disney Company Film Ella Enchanted. Stimulator's song "Let's Hook Up" was the theme song for E! Entertainment's 101 Juiciest Hollywood Hook-ups. The band's songs have also been used in trailers for the television show 90210.

The band has covered songs such as Rush's "Tom Sawyer" for Canadian release and Olivia Newton-John's "Magic" for special Australian release. Stimulator's animated/live action video for "Magic" featured a cameo by singer Cherie Currie from the classic all girl rock group The Runaways.

== Discography ==
Studio albums

- Stimulator – (2003) The Orchard Records
- Stimulator Official Debut – (2006) The Orchard Records
- Stimulator 2 – (2009) Dead Famous/MGM Records
- Lovelier in Black – (2010) The Orchard Records

EPs

- 78 Stimulator – (2003) Org Singles Club, Org Records

Compilations

- Teenacide Pajama Party – (2004) Teenacide Records
- Rockgirl: Discoveries 2005/Cool Women, Cool Times – (2005)

Soundtracks

- Ella Enchanted – (2004) Hollywood Records

Singles

- "Magic" – (2004) Lincoln Road/MGM Records
- "78 Stimulator" – (2005) The Lab/Universal Records
- "Mad World" – (2011) with Syndicate 17, Stimulator Records
