= Running with Scissors =

Running with Scissors may refer to:

- Running with Scissors (memoir), a 2002 book by Augusten Burroughs
- Running with Scissors (film), a 2006 adaptation of Burroughs's memoir, directed by Ryan Murphy
- Running with Scissors (band), a 1990s American rock band, or their 1993 eponymous album
- Running with Scissors ("Weird Al" Yankovic album), 1999
- Running with Scissors, a 2014 album by Janet Devlin
- "Running with Scissors", song by Ben Lee from the 2002 album Hey You. Yes You.
- Running with Scissors (company), an American video game developer
- "Running with Scissors" (Sex and the City), a 2000 TV episode
- Running with Scisssors (Cavetown album), 2026
