= Fush Yu Mang =

1997 album by Smash Mouth

Studio album by Smash Mouth
- Released: July 8, 1997
- Recorded: 1996–1997
- Studios: H.O.S. Recording, Redwood City, California, U.S.
- Genres: Pop-punk; ska punk; surf punk
- Length: 37:02
- Label: Interscope
- Producer: Eric Valentine

Smash Mouth chronology
Fush Yu Mang (1997)	Astro Lounge (1999)

Singles from Fush Yu Mang
- 1. "Walkin' on the Sun" Released: June 30, 1997; 2. "The Fonz" Released: September 24, 1997; 3. "Why Can't We Be Friends?" Released: January 12, 1998

Professional ratings
Review scores
Source	Rating
AllMusic	4/5 stars
Music Week	4/5 stars
The Rolling Stone Album Guide	4/5 stars
USA Today	3/4 stars
The Village Voice	A−

Fush Yu Mang is the debut studio album by American rock band Smash Mouth, released on July 8, 1997 by Interscope Records. It includes their first major hit, "Walkin' on the Sun". The title of the album was taken from a line ("fuck you, man!") slurred by Al Pacino in Scarface. The cover of the album features the band flying through space in guitarist Greg Camp's 1962 Ford Falcon Squire wagon, with a band member's outstretched arm giving the finger. The title is written in a stylized, pseudo-Asian font. The album also features a cover version of War's "Why Can't We Be Friends?". Fush Yu Mang has been certified double-platinum by the RIAA in the U.S. for sales in excess of 2 million.

An acoustic re-recording of Fush Yu Mang was planned in 2017 through PledgeMusic for the album's 20th anniversary, and was released on June 29, 2018.

== Musical style ==
Fush Yu Mang's lead single "Walkin' on the Sun" has a 1960s psychedelic soul and soul-funk music style compared to songs by 1960s music groups like the Zombies and the Yardbirds. It was the last song to be added onto the album. The rest of Fush Yu Mang has been described as pop-punk, ska punk, and surf punk, with influences from punk rock, ska, reggae, and speed metal. The album shares traits with bands like No Doubt and Goldfinger.

== Track listing ==
All tracks are written by Smash Mouth (Steve Harwell, Gregory Camp, Paul De Lisle and Kevin Coleman), except where noted. All tracks are produced by Eric Valentine.

No.	Title	Writer(s)	Length
1.	"Flo"		2:13
2.	"Beer Goggles"		2:02
3.	"Walkin' on the Sun"		3:27
4.	"Let's Rock"		2:49
5.	"Heave-Ho"		3:47
6.	"The Fonz"		3:39
7.	"Pet Names"		2:21
8.	"Padrino"		3:46
9.	"Nervous in the Alley"		2:32
10.	"Disconnect the Dots"		2:50
11.	"Push"		2:50
12.	"Why Can't We Be Friends?" (War cover)	Papa Dee Allen; Harold Ray Brown; B. B. Dickerson; Lonnie Jordan; Charles Miller; Lee Oskar; Howard E. Scott	4:50
Total length:			37:00

20th Anniversary bonus tracks

No.	Title	Writer(s)	Length
13.	"Every Word Means No" (Let's Active cover)	Mitch Easter	2:46
14.	"Sorry About Your Penis"		2:57
15.	"Dear Inez"		2:51
16.	"Walkin' on the Sun" (Dave Audé Club Remix)		4:27

== Personnel ==
All credits for Fush Yu Mang are adapted from the album's liner notes.

Smash Mouth

- Steve Harwell – lead vocals
- Greg Camp – guitar, backing vocals, co-lead vocals on "Padrino"
- Paul De Lisle – bass, backing vocals
- Kevin Coleman – drums

Additional musicians

- John Gove – trombone
- John Gibson – trumpet
- Les Harris – saxophone
- Michael Klooster – keyboards (track 3)
- J. Grady – additional singing and yelling
- Mark Harwell – additional singing and yelling
- Anzimee Camp – additional singing and yelling
- Kelly Young – additional singing and yelling
- Boston Johnny – additional singing and yelling
- Jason Slater – additional singing and yelling
- Sam Burbank – additional singing and yelling
- Dan Plock – additional singing and yelling

Production personnel

- Eric Valentine – production, engineering, mixing, keys, percussion, groovy noises (except 14 & 15)
- Jai Winding – production (14 & 15)
- Smash Mouth – production (14 & 15)
- Mark Endert – engineering (14 & 15)
- Brian "Big Bass" Gardner – mastering
- Dino Passanisi – cover art concept & logo design
- Liam Ward – design
- Trisha Leeper – cover photo
- Jay Blakesberg – band photo

== Charts ==
=== Weekly charts ===
Chart (1997–1998)	Peak position
New Zealand Albums (RMNZ)	42
US Billboard 200	19
US Heatseekers Albums (Billboard)	2

2022 weekly chart performance
Chart (2022)	Peak position
US Indie Store Album Sales (Billboard)	22

=== Year-end charts ===
Chart (1997)	Position
Canada Albums (Nielsen Soundscan)	95
US Billboard 200	121
Chart (1998)	Position
US Billboard 200	50

== Certifications ==
Region	Certification	Certified units/sales
Canada (Music Canada)	Platinum	100,000^{^}
United States (RIAA)	2× Platinum	2,000,000^{^}
^{^} Shipments figures based on certification alone.
