= Le Cock Sportif =

Studio album by Brougham
- Released: May 30, 2000
- Genre: Rap rock
- Length: 39:46
- Label: Warner Bros.
- Producer: Jason Slater; David Kahne; Joe Barresi

Brougham chronology
Le Cock Sportif (2000)	Bateh Bros. (2022)

Singles from Singles from Le Cock Sportif
- 1. "Murked Out" Released: 2000

Professional ratings
Review scores
Source	Rating
Allmusic	4/5 stars
HipOnline	6.5/10
Robert Christgau	(2-star Honorable Mention)

Le Cock Sportif is the debut studio album by the rap rock group Brougham. The album spawned one single, "Murked Out." A music video, directed by Chris Cuffaro, was released. The cover and album artwork featured porn stars Raylene and Dasha, who also appeared in the "Murked Out" video.

Spin Magazine named the album title the "worst rap-rock album title" ever.

== Background & recording ==
Initially formed in 1997 by Jason Slater (from Third Eye Blind) and Luke Oakson, Brougham had been working on material for a couple of years prior to the recording of "Le Cock Sportif." Slater and Oakson were the predominant musicians involved in recording the album, though the two recruited additional musicians for some of the songs, similar to how Slater operated Snake River Conspiracy. Slater left to tour with Snake River Conspiracy, but Oakson remained and toured as Brougham briefly, before the group disbanded completely in late 2000.

== Critical reception ==
Despite its commercial failure, the album was well-received by music critics. AllMusic's review, penned by Steve Huey, commented that the music has "an upbeat, sunny feel reminiscent of sample-based hits by Smash Mouth or L.E.N., albeit with a hardcore rap edge," awarding the album 4 out of 5 stars. HipOnline's review by Rae Gun was similarly positive, calling the album "an acquired taste," likening the group's music to that of Kid Rock. Robert Christgau was less enthusiastic about the album, giving the album 2 stars and noting "Don't Speak English" and "Bong Hits" as the highlights.

== Track listing ==
All tracks are written by Jason Slater and Luke Oakson, except where noted

No.	Title	Writer(s)	Producer(s)	Length
1.	"Don't Speak English"		Jason Slater	3:02
2.	"7th Grade"	Billy Edd Wheeler; Roger Bowling; Jason Slater; Luke Oakson	Slater; David Kahne	4:04
3.	"Main Chick"		Slater; Kahne	4:07
4.	"Hubba Rock"	Slater; Oakson; John Wilson	Slater	3:43
5.	"Murked Out"	Slater; Oakson; Klaus Eichstadt	Slater; Joe Barresi	3:25
6.	"Kareem"		Slater; Kahne	4:07
7.	"Bong Hits"		Slater	5:09
8.	"Naw Mean"		Slater	3:26
9.	"Sangria"	Slater; Oakson; Tony Fredianelli	Slater; Kahne	3:29
10.	"Can't Sleep It Off"		Slater	3:08
11.	"Urbano's Montrose" (hidden track)		Slater	2:01
Total length:				39:46

== Personnel ==
Personnel per liner notes.

Brougham

- Jason Slater - production (all), song writing, instrumentation, engineering
- Luke Oakson - vocals, rapping, lyrics

Production

- Joe Barresi - producer (5), engineer
- David Kahne - producer (2, 3, 6, 9)
- Tony Fredianelli - songwriting (on Sangria)

Art

- Neil Kellerhouse - art direction
- Chris Cuffaro - photography
