= Steve Ouimette =

American guitarist (born 1968)

- Born: June 18, 1968 (age 58)
- Genres: Rock; hard rock; heavy metal
- Occupations: Musician; composer; producer
- Instrument: Guitar
- Formerly of: T-Ride; Snaketrain
- Website: steveouimette.com

Stephen Ouimette (born June 18, 1968) is an American rock guitarist. He is known for performing a cover version of the hit song "The Devil Went Down to Georgia" (which was originally by the Charlie Daniels Band) for the video game Guitar Hero III: Legends of Rock, in which the parts played on the fiddle are instead played on an electric guitar by Ouimette, Ed DeGenaro and Geoff Tyson (though the lyrics remained unchanged). Aside from this track, Ouimette also recorded seven other songs for the game, and also made a version of the Christmas carol "We Three Kings" released as downloadable content for Guitar Hero III.

In the early 1990s, he played guitar as a session member of the San Francisco-based hard rock band T-Ride, alongside Geoff Tyson. He was also associated with the 1980s rock group Snaketrain.

On October 12, 2010, Ouimette released the digital version of his solo debut album, EPIC. The physical version, which contained a bonus DVD, was released on October 26, 2010.

== Discography ==
=== With Snaketrain ===
- Snaketrain featuring Dave Candelaria and Steve Ouimette

=== With T-Ride ===
- T-Ride

=== Solo ===
- The Seattle Sessions (EP)
- EPIC

== Equipment ==
=== Guitars ===
Gibson Les Pauls, Godin Redline, Richmond Dorchester, Fender Nocaster, Baritones (Les Paul, Tacoma, Danelectro, Epiphone Newport Bass 6), Greco, Hamer, Vox, Jazz Bass, P-Bass, various vintage and modern acoustics.

=== Amplifiers ===
Ouimette uses a wide variety of vintage and modern guitars and amps. He endorses Godin Guitars, Eminence Speakers and D'Addario Strings. He also collects and plays homemade and exotic instruments like the Marx-o-Chime, Greek bouzouki, GuitarViol, mandolin, cigar box guitars and ukulele.

== Video game contributions ==
=== Guitar Hero III: Legends of Rock ===
- "The Devil Went Down to Georgia" by The Charlie Daniels Band
- "We Three Kings" by John Henry Hopkins Jr.
- "Top Gun Anthem" by Harold Faltermeyer
- "School's Out" by Alice Cooper
- "Rock You Like a Hurricane" by Scorpions
- "Talk Dirty to Me" by Poison
- "Cities on Flame with Rock and Roll" by Blue Öyster Cult
- "Barracuda" by Heart
- "Hit Me With Your Best Shot" by Pat Benatar
- "Mississippi Queen" by Mountain

=== Guitar Hero: Aerosmith ===
- "Hard to Handle" by The Black Crowes
- "Personality Crisis" by New York Dolls

=== Rock Revolution ===
- All songs except "Paralyzer" by Finger Eleven and "Given Up" by Linkin Park

=== Guitar Hero World Tour ===
- "Dueling Banjos" by Eric Weissberg and Steve Mandell

=== Guitar Hero 5, Band Hero & Guitar Hero: Warriors of Rock ===
- "Hark! The Herald Angels Sing" by Charles Wesley
- "God Save the Queen"
- "Il Canto degli Italiani"
- "La Marseillaise"
- "Lied der Deutschen"
- "The Star-Spangled Banner"
- "Poison" by Alice Cooper

=== Red Steel 2 ===
- "Canyon Melody"
- "Vulture's Prayer"
- "Kusagari Blues"

=== Tom Clancy's Ghost Recon Wildlands ===
- All songs in the soundtrack Ghost Recon Wildlands: Corrido - The Sounds of Santa Blanca, alongside Mario Tapia.

=== The Crew 2 ===
- "Welcome to MotorNation"
- "Live Goes to the Extreme" (featuring ill Factor)
- "Get Lost!"
- "Live from Anywhere, Live from Everywhere" (featuring ill Factor)
- "We Don't Need Roads"
- "Last Stand"
- "Americana"

=== Just Dance 2024 Edition ===
- "Swan Lake"
- "Tainted Love"

=== Just Dance 2025 Edition ===
- "Sleigh Ride"
- "Halloween's Here"

=== Entry Point ===
- "Here It Comes"
- "Best Laid Plans"

=== Stage Tour ===
- "Stage Tour"
