= Gimme What I Want =

Gimme What I Want may refer to:

- Gimme What I Want, a 2000 album by Pillbox
- Gimme What I Want, a 2017 EP by Lisa Prank & Seattle's Little Helpers of Father/Daughter Records
- "Gimme What I Want", a song by Keri Hilson from the album No Boys Allowed, 2010
- "Gimme What I Want" (Miley Cyrus song), from the album Plastic Hearts, 2020
