= The Dandelion Sessions =

Studio album by Aslyn
- Released: August 1, 2009 (iTunes); August 20, 2009 (Retail)
- Genre: Pop
- Label: Lemonade Records
- Producer: Aslyn, Mike Daly

Aslyn chronology
The Grand Garden EP (2008)	The Dandelion Sessions (2009)	DEGA (2016)

The Dandelion Sessions is the second album recorded by pop singer Aslyn, following her 4-disc set The Grand Garden EP released in 2008. It was originally titled Wherever the Dandelion Falls but was changed as the new title reflected the album better as a whole.

== Track listing ==
All songs by Aslyn and Jeremy Mitchell.

1. "Brokenhearted Day"
2. "Me & You & Daisies"
3. "Wherever the Dandelion Falls"
4. "What is the Difference"
5. "Trying to Drive" (Featuring Zac Brown)
6. "Making Her Right"
7. "Riding the Brakes"
8. "The Way It Goes"
9. "In & Out"
10. "Your Best Thing"
11. "Nadine"
12. "Growing Out Of You"
13. "Can't Get There From Here" (Parking Lot Song - Part 2)
