= Vulcan (EP) =

EP by Snake River Conspiracy
- Released: October 5, 1999
- Genre: Industrial rock; industrial metal; electronic rock; electronica
- Length: 11:18 (7" single); 26:26 (CD)
- Label: Reprise; Morpehus (UK)
- Producer: Jason Slater; David Kahne; Eric Valentine

Snake River Conspiracy chronology
Vulcan (1999)	Sonic Jihad (2000)

Snake River Conspiracy singles chronology
"Vulcan" (1999)	"How Soon Is Now?" (2000)

Vulcan is the debut extended play by American industrial rock band Snake River Conspiracy. It was released on October 5, 1999. The five-song EP contains three renditions of the title track, along with a B-side and a cover of the Beatles song "She Said She Said." The song Vulcan was also included on the band's debut album, Sonic Jihad, which came out in July 2000.

== Reception ==
In a positive review from NME, Steven Wells described Vulcan as "Y2K Tourette’s Pop" and named it as the "Single of the Week", writing that "[I]t beats the living shit out every single other record released this week and then dances naked around a bonfire of their burning corpses daubed in satanic runes and gibbering like a traumatised gibbon." In theVillage Voice, Chuck Eddy called it "a suburban s&m theme park set to wax, kinky in a really cute way" but noted "Nobody audibly utters 'vulcan" anywhere in the lyrics, but a different word keeps recurring."

== Track listing ==
UK 7" single (morph-003 ep)
No.	Title	Writer(s)	Producer(s)	Length
1.	"Vulcan"	Eric Valentine; Jason Slater	Eric Valentine; Jason Slater	4:01
2.	"She Said She Said" (The Beatles cover)	Lennon–McCartney	David Kahne; Jason Slater	3:35
3.	"Coke & Vaseline"	Slater; Denny Porter	Kahne; Slater	3:42
Total length:				11:19

Enhanced CD Maxi-Single
No.	Title	Length
4.	"Vulcan" (Johnny Vicious Remix)	8:32
5.	"Vulcan" (Loadblower Remix)	6:36
Total length:		26:27
