= The Grand Garden =

The Grand Garden EP

EP by Aslyn
- Released: January 7, 2008 (iTunes)
- Recorded: 2005–2007
- Genre: Pop
- Label: Independent

Aslyn chronology
Lemon Love (2005)	The Grand Garden EP (2008)	The Dandelion Sessions (2009)

The Grand Garden EP is an EP recorded by singer-songwriter Aslyn and was released on Independent in 2008. The EP contains 28 songs, most of which were recorded between Aslyn's debut album, Lemon Love and her second album, The Dandelion Sessions. It is divided up into four parts or 'phases', each one having seven different songs.

== Track listing ==
Disc 1

1. "Wally"
2. "What is the Difference"
3. "A Lucky One"
4. "Bread Crumbs"
5. "Love Engineer"
6. Promise
7. "Bettertown" (Jeremy Mitchell, Aslyn)

Disc 2

1. "Suburbia" (Jeremy Mitchell, Aslyn)
2. "Golden"
3. "Mr. Willow"
4. "Whenever You Go"
5. "Turn Around"
6. "Kisses"
7. "One Extra Hour"

Disc 3

1. "The Flies Know"
2. "Here's To Believe"
3. "In and Out"
4. "Puzzle"
5. "Not the Only One"
6. "Can I Go" (Jon Mitchell, Aslyn)

Disc 4

1. "Rosemary"
2. "That's When I Love You"
3. "Wish You Were Here" (Jeremy Mitchell, Aslyn)
4. "If All of These Things"
5. "Cannot Take a Secret"
6. "In These Shoes (parking lot part 1)"
7. "You Don't See"
