= T-Ride (album) =

Studio album by T-Ride
- Released: May 19, 1992
- Genre: Hard rock, heavy metal, experimental rock
- Label: Hollywood
- Producer: Eric Valentine

Professional ratings
Review scores
Source	Rating
AllMusic	4/5 stars

T-Ride is the debut album by the California rock band T-Ride. Noted for its complex instrument and vocal arrangements, it featured Dan Arlie's multi-octave vocal styles and Van Halen-influenced guitar playing by Geoff Tyson. Songs from the album were used in various motion pictures and television shows including "Luxury Cruiser" in the soundtrack of 1992's Encino Man, "Zombies from Hell" in the movie Captain Ron and "Bone Down" in an episode of Baywatch, "Forbidden Paradise-part 2". The band did a small club tour during the summer and opened for Joe Satriani on a national theater tour. Drummer/producer Eric Valentine went on to become a multi-platinum selling producer of acts including: Smash Mouth, Queens of the Stone Age, Third Eye Blind, Lostprophets, Good Charlotte, Nickel Creek, John Fogerty and more.

"You and Your Friend" was covered by Snake River Conspiracy in 2000 for their debut album Sonic Jihad, which Eric Valentine co-produced.

== Track listing ==
1. "Zombies from Hell"
2. "Backdoor Romeo"
3. "Ride"
4. "You and Your Friend"
5. "I Hunger"
6. "Luxury Cruiser"
7. "Hit Squad"
8. "Bad Girls and Angels"
9. "Bone Down"
10. "Fire It Up"
11. "Heroes and Villains"
