= Aslyn =

American singer-songwriter

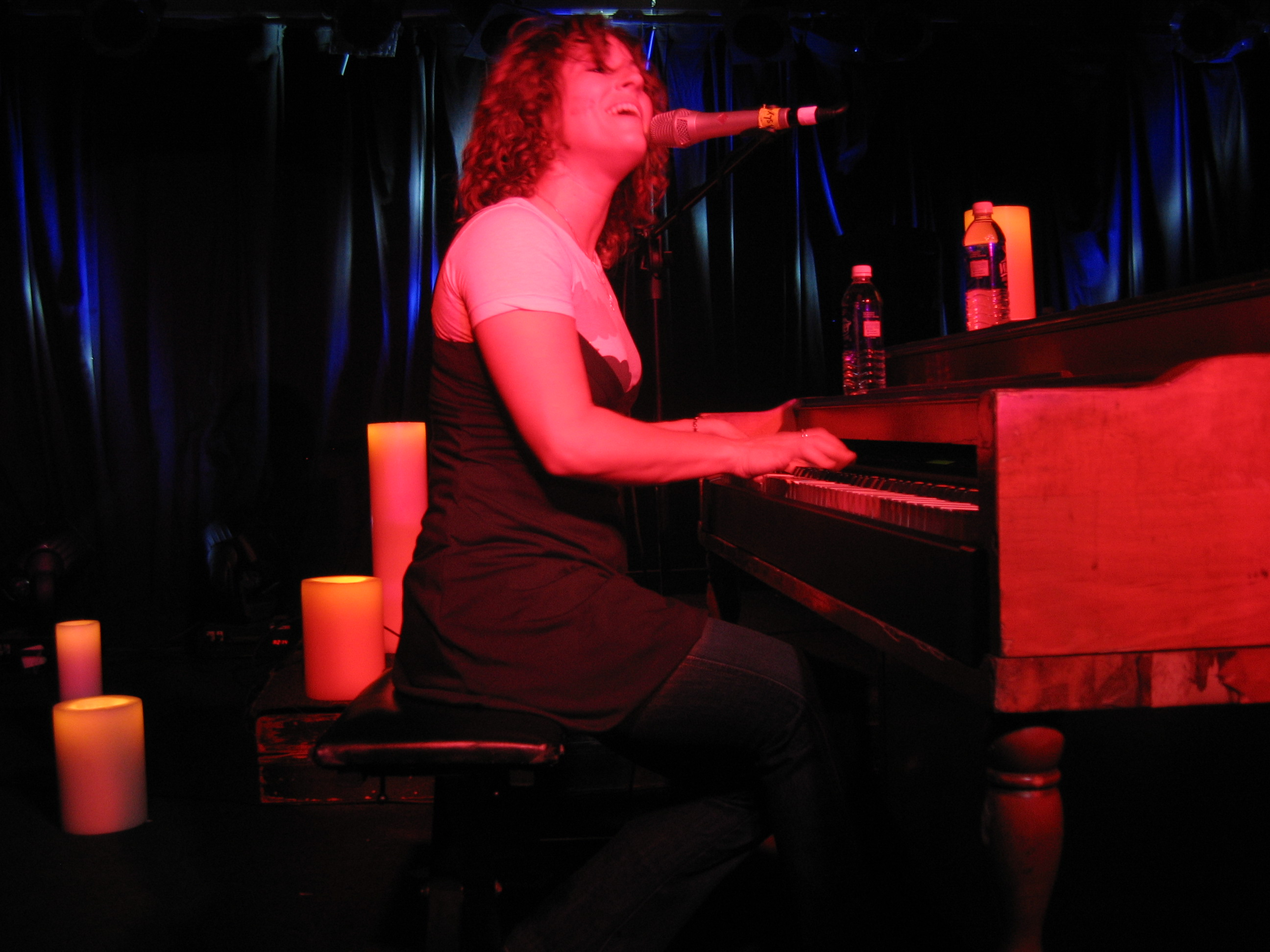
- Aslyn performing in 2006

Background information
- Born: Heather Mitchell; September 21, 1980 (age 45); Chiefland, Florida
- Origin: Atlanta, Georgia, United States
- Genres: Pop
- Occupation: Musician
- Instruments: vocals, piano, keyboards
- Label: Capitol
- Website: www.aslyn.net

Heather "Aslyn" Mitchell Nash (born September 21, 1980) is an American pop singer and songwriter from Atlanta, Georgia. She released two full-length albums, Lemon Love and The Dandelion Sessions, as well as a 4-disc EP. She is also the sister of three members of the band Georgia.

== Early years ==
Aslyn was born in west Florida and raised in Chiefland, Florida, outside of Gainesville. At the age of seven, she began taking piano lesson Immediately submersing herself into the music scene, she did everything she could to gain exposure to live performing: entering talent contests, singing at weddings, and performing at church.

Upon graduating from high school, Aslyn attended Carson-Newman College in Jefferson City, Tennessee and received her college degree. She then followed her dream of performing, which led her to Atlanta, Georgia, where she lived on various people's couches for a while as she performed throughout the town.

During this phase in her life, Aslyn purchased her first car with saved money. She referred to this car as a "lemon", and it eventually inspired the title track of her debut album, "Lemon Love". She briefly dated Butch Walker, mentioning him in her song "Golden" as "Number Five."

== Musical career ==
While performing on a nightly basis, Aslyn began to immerse herself in many different genres of music. Many artists influenced her including Stevie Wonder, The Beatles, Earth Wind & Fire, and Queen.

Beginning in 2002, Aslyn began to compose many of the songs that would be the basis for Lemon Love. Record companies in Los Angeles began to show interest in Aslyn's music, inspiring her to begin searching for a record label.

Aslyn performed a very personal song for Capitol Records entitled "493–1023" which speaks about her father's job loss and ensuing loss of family stability. Upon hearing the song, the record label signed her immediately.

While preparing to record and write the songs for her debut CD, Aslyn requested to work with producer Guy Chambers. She had become interested in Chambers' work after hearing the heavily European sound on many of Robbie Williams' albums. Chambers produced eight of the twelve tracks on Lemon Love. For the remaining four, Aslyn worked with a California-based producer, Eric Valentine.

Two singles were released off the album: "Be the Girl" and "Gotta Get Over You". The first single that peaked at #35 on the Billboard Adult Contemporary chart. Aslyn's sound as a performer has been classified as more of an "independent pop/alternative singer". Her single "Be the Girl" was featured in an episode of Laguna Beach: The Real Orange County on MTV."Be the Girl" also got featured in the "Bratz: Rock Angelz" video game.

After the release of her album, Aslyn began to tour the United States which such headliners as Ryan Cabrera, Better Than Ezra, Gavin DeGraw, The Click Five, and Chris Isaak. The album peaked at #36 on the Billboard Top Heatseeker chart.

In January 2008, Aslyn released an EP entitled The Grand Garden EP. The EP features 27 songs divided up into four parts or phases, most of which were recorded between Lemon Love and The Dandelion Sessions. The following year, she toured with Toby Lightman.

Her second album, The Dandelion Sessions, was released on August 1, 2009 on iTunes.

Aslyn also performed at the benefit Zac Brown Band and Friends Concert on October 30, 2009 to help raise money for Athens' historic Georgia Theatre which burned down four months earlier on June 19.

In 2011, Aslyn released a live album Five Live on digital services on February 14. The physical version of the release was made available on May 14, 2012 through Amazon's Burn-On-Demand service.

Aslyn joined singing on the Get $leazy tour with Kesha in 2011 in addition to also appearing on an episode of Victorious with the band.

Later that year, Aslyn contributed vocals and co-wrote some songs on Kalen Nash's Ukred album which was released in 2012.

Aslyn formed the duo DEGA with her husband, Kalen Nash in 2013. They are currently touring festivals and select tour dates. Their debut album DEGA is set for release in 2017.

== Musical style and reception ==
Aslyn’s work centers on pop and adult-oriented pop/rock with piano-led arrangements, often blending upbeat hooks with reflective lyrics. Contemporary coverage described her as a charismatic live performer. "Paste" reported on her energetic stage presence during 2005 club dates in Atlanta.

== Personal life ==
Aslyn married musician Kalen Nash on October 15, 2011. Her brothers were in a country rock band called 'Georgia'. They were signed with Atlantic Records from 2007 to 2010.

== Discography ==
=== Albums ===
Year	Album	Top Heatseeker	Label
2005	Lemon Love	36	Capitol
2009	The Dandelion Sessions	–	Lemonade Records
2011	Five Live	–	Lemonade Records
2017	DEGA	–	Lemonade Records

=== Singles ===
Year	Single	Adult Top 40	Album
2005	"Be The Girl"	26	Lemon Love
2005	"Gotta Get Over You"	–	Lemon Love
2009	"Me & You & Daisies"	–	The Dandelion Sessions
2016	"Right Type of Lover" (as DEGA)	–	DEGA
2017	"Trying to Drive" (with Zac Brown Band)	–	Welcome Home

=== EPs ===
2008: The Grand Garden EP

== Tours ==
2017

- Spring Tour
  (with Washed Out)

2012

- Cayamo 2012

2011

- Get $leazy
  with Kesha

2010

- Summer Tour
- Western Tour
  with Toby Lightman

2009

- Cayamo 2009

2008

- The Rock Boat VIII

2007

- The Rock Boat VII

2006

- The Rock Boat VI

2005

- House of Blues Tour
  with special guest, Ryan Cabrera
- University Tour
  with special guest, Gavin DeGraw
- Ride the Wave Tour
  with special guest, The Click Five
