= Magic (Smash Mouth album) =

Studio album by Smash Mouth
- Released: September 4, 2012
- Recorded: 2011–2012
- Studios: Barefoot Studios, Hollywood
- Genre: Rock
- Length: 33:24
- Label: 429
- Producers: Mike Krompass; Eric Valentine

Smash Mouth chronology
Summer Girl (2006)	Magic (2012)	Missile Toes (2023)

Singles from Magic
- 1. "Magic" Released: August 14, 2012

Magic is the seventh studio album by American rock band Smash Mouth, released on September 4, 2012 through 429 Records. It was their first album in six years following the release of Summer Girl in 2006. It is also the first album without original guitarist and primary songwriter Greg Camp since his departure from the band, and the last album to feature lead vocalist Steve Harwell before his retirement in 2021 and death in 2023. It was also their last original album for 14 years, until 2026's Mercury Comet.

The first single on the album, "Magic", peaked at No. 22 on the Billboard Adult Contemporary chart.

== Reception ==
Professional ratings
Review scores
Source	Rating
AllMusic	3.5/5 stars
Louder	2.5/5 stars

AllMusic gave the album 3½ stars, saying it was "as effortlessly effervescent as anything else Smash Mouth has ever released, filled with grooving, organ-fueled beach party anthems".

== Track listing ==
Magic track listing
No.	Title	Writer(s)	Length
1.	"Perfect Planet"	Steve Harwell; Mike Krompass; Shelly Peiken	2:36
2.	"Live to Love Another Day"	Randy Cooke; Harwell; Krompass; Jim McCormick	2:41
3.	"Magic" (featuring J. Dash)	Cooke; J. Dash; Harwell; Krompass; Tebey Ottoh; Jennifer Paige	2:59
4.	"Justin Bieber"	Harwell; Krompass; Peiken	2:33
5.	"Out of Love"	Andrew Fromm; Harwell; Krompass; Peiken	3:35
6.	"Flippin' Out" (featuring J. Dash)	J. Dash; Fromm; Harwell; Krompass	3:00
7.	"Future X Wife"	Fromm; Harwell; Krompass; Peiken	2:29
8.	"Better with Time"	Harwell; Krompass; Peiken	3:14
9.	"The Game"	Fromm; Harwell; Krompass; Peiken	2:36
10.	"She's Into Me"	Harwell; Scott Krippayne; Ron Robinson; Brodie Stewart	3:20
11.	"Don't You (Forget About Me)" (Simple Minds cover)	Keith Forsey; Steve Schiff	4:21

== Personnel ==
Smash Mouth

- Steve Harwell – lead vocals
- Michael Klooster – keyboards
- Mike Krompass – additional keyboards, guitars, drum programming, backing vocals
- Greg Camp – guitars (11), backing vocals (11)
- Paul De Lisle – bass, backing vocals
- Randy Cooke – drums
- Michael Urbano – drums (11)

Additional personnel

- John Portela – additional keyboards
- J. Dash – vocals (3, 6)
- Andrew Fromm – backing vocals
- Storm Gardiner – backing vocals
- Shawn Mayer – backing vocals
- Jennifer Paige – backing vocals
- Stephen Vickers – backing vocals

=== Production ===
- Jared Levine – A&R
- Mike Krompass – producer, engineer, mixing
- Ben Harrington – assistant engineer, mix assistant
- Steve Murr – additional recording
- Eric Valentine – producer, engineer, mixing (11)
- Dave McNair – mastering
- David Alan Kogut – art direction
- Calibree Photography – photography
- Robert Hayes – management

== Charts ==
=== Singles ===
Year	Song	US Adult
2012	"Magic"	22
