= Nightmare and the Cat =

British-American band

- Origin: Los Angeles, United States
- Genres: Indie rock, alternative rock
- Years active: 2010–2015
- Label: Capitol
- Members: Django Stewart; Samuel Stewart; Claire Acey; Scott Henson; Brandon "Spike" Phillips

Nightmare and the Cat was a five-piece British-American indie rock band that formed in 2010. The band consisted of the Stewart brothers Django Stewart (vocals), Samuel Stewart (guitar), Claire Acey (vocals), Scott Henson (bass) and Spike Phillips (drums). Samuel is also a member of Lo Moon.

== History ==
The band was formed in Los Angeles by brothers Samuel Stewart and Django Stewart, sons of musician/producer Dave Stewart and Siobhan Fahey. Samuel and Django had both been involved in previous bands in London and Los Angeles, including Blondelle and Django James and the Midnight Squires, respectively.

The band built a considerable following on YouTube posting covers and acoustic performances. The band self released the Nightmare and the Cat EP and soon garnered the attraction of major management companies and labels, signing with In De Goot Entertainment in 2011 who found them a home at Capitol Records in 2013. Their debut release Simple EP, produced by Eric Valentine was released on Capitol Records on September 17, 2013. The band collaborated with artist Gary Baseman in their artwork and some live performances. Their first LP, also titled Simple, was released in July 2014. On May 15, 2014, Nightmare and the Cat performed "Undercover" on The Late Show with David Letterman.

On October 28, 2015, Django took to Facebook to announce that Nightmare and the Cat "is no more".

== Touring ==
In 2013, the band toured across the United States supporting label mates Bastille with Little Daylight. In 2014, they were on tour supporting Neon Trees with Smallpools.

== Band members ==
- Django Stewart – lead vocals, tambourine
- Samuel Stewart – guitar
- Claire Acey – backing vocals, guitar, drums
- Scott Henson – bass guitar
- Brandon "Spike" Philips – drums
- Julie Mitchell – bass guitar

== Discography ==
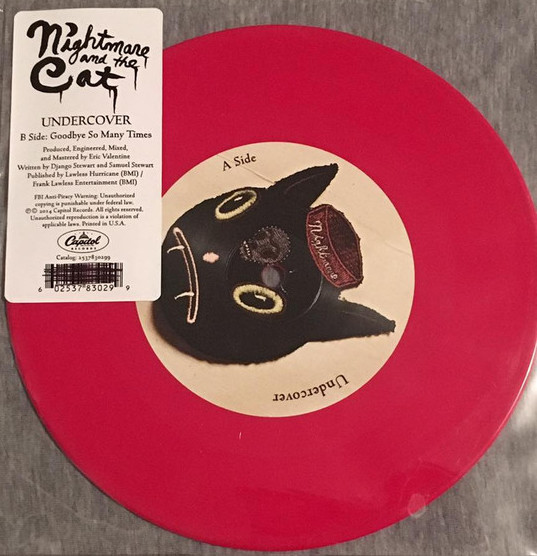
7" red vinyl cover artwork for the single "Undercover"

=== Albums ===
- Simple (July 2014), Capitol

=== Singles and EPs ===
- Nightmare and the Cat EP (July 2011), self-released
- Simple EP (September 2013), Capitol
- "Undercover" (2014), Capitol
