= Persephone's Bees =

Oakland, California based music group

Persephone’s Bees
- Origin: Oakland, California, United States
- Genres: Pop, pop rock, electropop
- Years active: 1999–present
- Members: Angelina Moysov; Tom Ayres

Persephone's Bees is an American pop/rock/electropop music group, whose members are Angelina Moysov (vocals and keyboards), Tom Ayres (guitar), Paul Bertolino (drums), and Bart Davenport (bass). Bass players have included Mike Ferrel and Ethan Parsonage.

The band's name is taken from a poem by Russian poet Osip Mandelstam.

== History ==
Growing up in Pyatigorsk, Russia, lead singer Angelina Moysov was musically inspired by her family: her mother played traditional folk/gypsy music, while her brother played modern music and Russian underground punk. Her family brought her to America in 1993.

Moysov met Tom Ayres in 1993 in Monterey, California, while she was working as a waitress and Ayres as a local musician. They formed a band, eventually moving to the Bay Area. While playing a show at the Paradise Lounge in San Francisco, they met producer Eric Valentine, who invited them to record an album for his label.

Their first LP, City of Love, was nominated for best debut album at the California Music Awards, along with being voted "Best Bay Area Pop Band" by SF Weekly. After releasing the LP, they toured with Cake and Jonathan Richman.

In 2006 they signed to Columbia Records and released their major label debut, Notes from the Underworld. The debut single reached No. 3 in Billboard Magazine's Club & Dance charts. "City of Love" was also featured in the opening scene and soundtrack to the movie Bewitched starring Will Ferrell and Nichole Kidman. "Muzika Dlya Fil'ma" was featured as soundtrack in EA Sports game, FIFA 07. Also, their single "Nice Day" appeared on the soundtrack of the 2007 film, Nancy Drew.

They toured with The New Cars as their opening act during their Winter Road Rage Tour '06.

The band's songs have appeared on The Sopranos ("Home" in episode "Cold Stones"), Weeds ("Little Boxes" in Season 3), and numerous film, TV, and commercial placements including Hilton Hotels, Cingular and more.

Persephone's Bees have been featured on popular music outlets such as MTV's "You Hear It First" (SXSW 2006 "Hot Bands to see"), Nic Harcourt's KCRW show Morning Becomes Eclectic, and Yahoo Music.

Angelina Moysov's most recent side project is pop/rock band Candy Now!, which she formed with Blag Dahlia of The Dwarves.

In October 2010, the band relocated to New York and while on tour recorded and released a free download of Leonard Cohen's "First We Take Manhattan".

Shortly afterwards Persephone's Bees announced the self-release of their new album New In Berlin. All the songs from the album were digitally released as singles every 6 weeks and in July, 2012 Persephone's Bees announced the release of the record as a vinyl with digital download of all the songs plus extra songs sung in Russian, German and French.

== Albums ==
- City of Love (2002)
- Notes from the Underworld (2006)
- Selections from the forthcoming new album (EP) (2010)
- New In Berlin (vinyl) (2012)
