= Running with Scissors (band) =

American rock band

- Origin: Tacoma, Washington, U.S.
- Genres: Rock, alternative rock
- Years active: 1992–1995?
- Labels: Procession Records, Instant Records
- Members: Brian Parker; Denny Porter; John Fox; Les Johnson; Mark Tennison

Running with Scissors was an American rock band from Seattle, Washington. The band consisted of Denny Porter as lead vocalist, John Fox on bass, John Atten on guitar, Brian Parker on keyboards, and Mark Tennison on drums.

== History ==
Porter got his motivation to start a band from watching A Hard Day's Night by The Beatles when he was a kid and declared "That's it, that's what I want to do." Porter mentions that other bands inspired him like The Rolling Stones, New York Dolls, and early Alice Cooper. The band would eventually work with producer Mike Caviezel to produce some of their albums, and later Denny Porter as a solo artist. Denny Porter would also be a part of the group Blue Baboons.

The band appeared on the Northwest Post-Grunge compilation by Elemental Records and their track "Oh Well" was described as a stand out track.

Two of the band's songs, "Act Your Age" and "Oh Well", were covered by the industrial rock band Snake River Conspiracy on their debut studio album, Sonic Jihad (2000).

== Musical style ==
Their sound is described as influenced by The Kinks, with touches of Ray Davies and David Bowie.

== Discography ==
=== Studio albums ===
- Running with Scissors (1993)
- Single Bullet Theory (1994)
- Ordinary Leper (1994)

=== Other releases ===
- Northwest Post-Grunge (1994, compilation disc – track "Oh Well")
