= Susan Hyatt =

American singer, songwriter, and recording artist (born 1967)

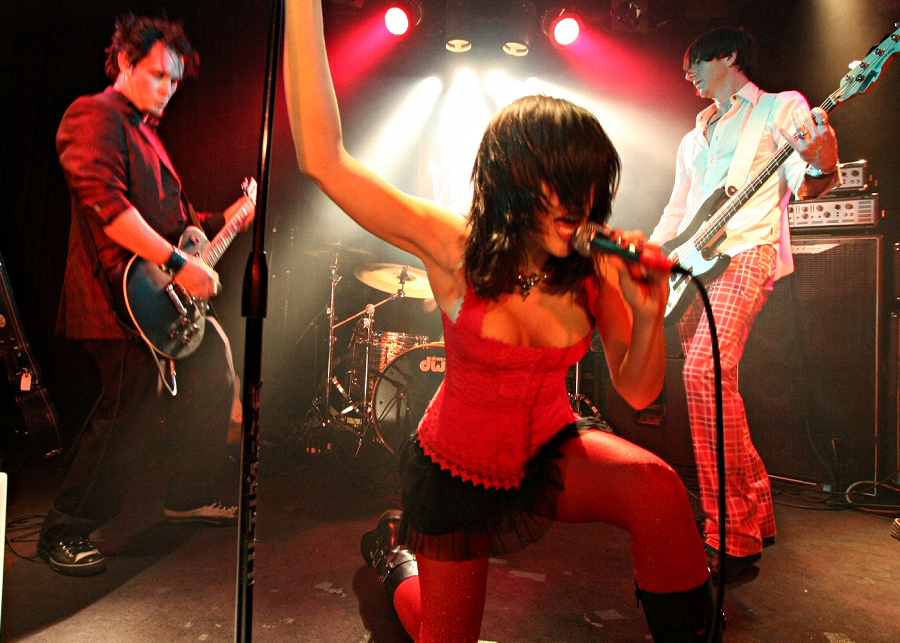
- Hyatt, center, singing with her band Stimulator at the Viper Room in West Hollywood, California, 2010

Background information
- Born: October 13, 1967 (age 58)
- Genres: New wave, disco, grunge, alternative rock
- Occupation: Musician
- Instruments: Vocals, guitar
- Years active: 1984–present
- Labels: WEA, Polygram, MGM

Susan Hyatt (born 1967) is an American singer, songwriter, and recording artist. She is the lead vocalist and co-founding member of the alternative pop-rock bands: Stimulator, Pillbox, Sizon & Glitter Symphony, and Sirens of Soho.

== Early life and career ==
Hyatt was born in Seattle, Washington, in 1967. In the 1980s, Susan was briefly a guitarist for the all-female band The Pandoras. In 1992, Hyatt released a dance version of Simon and Garfunkel's "The 59th Street Bridge Song" on WEA Records/Warner Music, which was produced by members of Kissing the Pink.

In 1993, Hyatt formed grunge/punk/pop band Pillbox in London, with bassists Carrie Melbourne (Babylon Zoo) and Sean Harrington. Pillbox signed to Polygram/Universal Music. Two years later, Pillbox's debut single, "Invasion (What Really Turns You On?)", became a top-20 UK indie hit. Pillbox's music was licensed to several episodes of the TV series Dawson's Creek. In 1998, Pillbox was included in The Virgin Encyclopedia of Indie and New Wave by Colin Larkin.

Hyatt co-hosted a live music television show, The Pulse, on the MP3TV network in the UK in 2000, with co-presenter Tim Kash.

In 2002, Hyatt became the guitar coach for Gina Gershon in the Lionsgate movie Prey for Rock and Roll. In 2003, Hyatt formed Stimulator with guitarist/producer Geoff Tyson. In 2004, Stimulator's cover of Olivia Newton-John's "Magic" was featured in the 2004 soundtrack for the Miramax film Ella Enchanted on Hollywood Records. Stimulator's debut album was licensed by the Lab/Universal Records in 2005. In 2005 and 2006, Stimulator supported Duran Duran and The Go-Go's on their US national tours. Hyatt was the live guitarist for Juliet Richardson's 2005 tour, opening nationally for Duran Duran.

From 2007 to 2008, Hyatt was the singing coach at The Paul Green School of Rock Music in Hollywood. In 2009, Hyatt released her first Fitness DVD, Susan Hyatt's Rockstar Workout, through Bayview Entertainment.

From 2021 to 2023, Hyatt joined the Gary Numan tribute band Airlane. She recorded the vocals for "Are Friends Electric", "Metal", and "Tracks". Hyatt's vocals raised the bar for Airlane. Her voice transformed the Gary Numan classics. The pairing between drummer/producer Jeff Riddle and Hyatt proved to be the winning formula for Airlane.

== 2010s ==
From 2010 to 2011, Stimulator's "Magic" was featured in Macy's nationwide television and radio "Find Your Magic" commercials.

In 2011, Hyatt formed Sirens of Soho with songwriter/producer Darren Howard. Sirens of Soho are best known for their single "Calling All My Girls", which is the theme song for the Telepictures/Warner Bros. Television distributed television talk show Bethenny.

Hyatt and Syndicate 17's cover of "Mad World" was featured on ABC TV show Body of Proof in 2012. Hyatt formed an all-female band, the Alternachicks, with Sheri Kaplan Weinstein (a childhood friend who was formerly in The Pandoras with Hyatt) and Beth-Ami Heavenstone. Hyatt is also a singing coach for Dev & the Cataracs.

The debut album for Sirens of Soho was scheduled to be released on Telepictures Music on September 3, 2013.

As lead singer and guitarist of The 21st Century Pandoras, Hyatt has released two digital singles—"Joyride" and "Flashback Forever"—in 2014.

From 2021 to the present, Hyatt has done vocals for the Gary Numan tribute band Airlane. Airlane is Jeff Riddle drums, Mark Gerrie synth, Greg Bracewell bass and Susan Hyatt vocals. Hyatt sings on "Are Friends Electric", "Metal", and "Tracks".

== Discography ==
- "The 59th Street Bridge Song (Feelin' Groovy)"/"Sea Heaven" – Susan Hyatt solo (WEA Records/Warner Music UK, 1993)
- "Gimme What I Want" – Pillbox (NYC Records Ltd./Pinnacle, 2000)
- "Blockbuster – A Glitter/Glam Rock Experience" Compilation (Pillbox – Conspiracy Records, 2000)
- "Sterilise Me" – Pillbox (NYC Records Ltd./Pinnacle, 2001)
- The Teenage Years – Pillbox (NYC Records Ltd./Pinnacle, 2002)
- "Lovely and Amazing" Soundtrack (Pillbox, Lions Gate 2002)
- Stimulator – Stimulator (Stimulator Records, 2003)
- Ella Enchanted Soundtrack (Stimulator, Hollywood Records, 2004)
- "78 Stimulator" (The Lab/Universal Records, 2005)
- Stimulator Official Debut (The Orchard Records, 2006)
- Stimulator 2 (Dead Famous/MGM, 2009)
- Lovelier in Black (The Orchard Records, 2010)
- "Calling All My Girls" (Telepictures Music, 2012)
- "Are Friends Electric" (Airlane album Hate and Machinery), Films Music, 2022
- "Metal" (Airlane album Hate and Machinery), Films Music, 2022
- "Tracks" (Airlane album Hate and Machinery), Films Music, 2022

== DVDs ==
- Susan Hyatt's Rockstar Workout (BayView Entertainment, 2009)
