= How Soon Is Now? =

1985 single by the Smiths

Single by The Smiths
- B-side: "Well I Wonder"; "Oscillate Wildly"
- Written: June 1984
- Released: 1984
- Studio: Jam (London)
- Genre: Alternative rock; psychedelia
- Length: 6:44
- Label: Rough Trade
- Composer: Johnny Marr
- Lyricist: Morrissey
- Producer: John Porter

The Smiths singles chronology
"William, It Was Really Nothing" (1984)	"How Soon Is Now?" (1984)	"Barbarism Begins at Home" (1985)

Alternative cover
- 1985 UK release

Music video
- "How Soon Is Now?" on YouTube

"How Soon Is Now?" is a song by English rock band the Smiths, written by singer Morrissey and guitarist Johnny Marr. Originally a B-side of the 1984 single "William, It Was Really Nothing", "How Soon Is Now?" was subsequently featured on the compilation album Hatful of Hollow and on US, Canadian, Australian, and Warner UK editions of Meat Is Murder. First released as a single in the US in 1984 by Sire Records and later in the UK by Rough Trade in January 1985, it reached No. 24 on the UK Singles Chart. When re-released in 1992, it reached No. 16.

The 1973 book Popcorn Venus, written by Marjorie Rosen, and a favourite of Morrissey's, was the inspiration for the title of the track.

In 2007, Marr said "How Soon Is Now?" is "possibly [the Smiths'] most enduring record. It's most people's favourite, I think." Despite its prominent place in the Smiths' repertoire, it is not generally considered to be representative of the band's style. Although a club favourite, it did not chart as well as expected. Most commentators put this down to the fact that the song had been out on vinyl in a number of forms before being released as a single in its own right. The original track runs for nearly seven minutes; the 7-inch single edit cut the length down to under four minutes. The complete version is generally used on compilations.

A cover of the song by Love Spit Love was used in the soundtrack for the 1996 film The Craft and later appeared as the theme song of the television series Charmed for eight seasons.

== Origin and recording ==
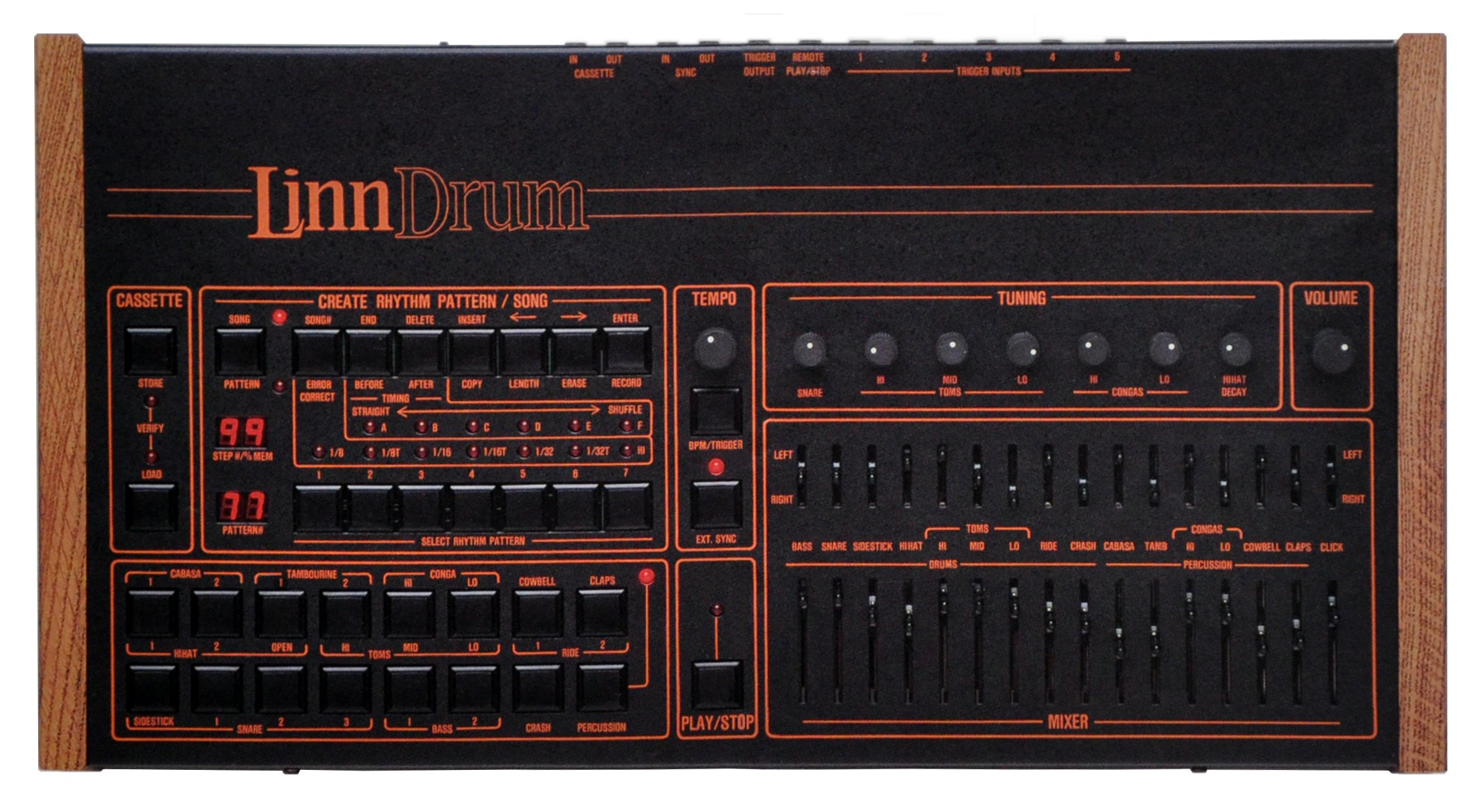
Producer John Porter created part of the song's iconic guitar tremolo effect using a noise gate triggered by a LinnDrum (pictured).

Smiths guitarist Johnny Marr wrote "How Soon Is Now?" along with "William, It Was Really Nothing" and "Please, Please, Please, Let Me Get What I Want" during a four-day period at Earl's Court in London in June 1984. His demo was originally called "Swamp". In contrast to the frequent chord changes he had employed in most Smiths' songs, Marr wanted to explore building a song around a single chord (in this case, F♯) as much as possible, which also appealed to producer John Porter.

Marr recorded the song with bandmates Andy Rourke and Mike Joyce that July at London's Jam Studios. After a night out celebrating the session for "William, It Was Really Nothing" and "Please Please Please Let Me Get What I Want", the trio had reconvened the following afternoon to record what became "How Soon Is Now?" Porter was impressed by the basic riff Marr showed him, but felt the song needed something else. Their discussion turned to the early recordings of Elvis Presley, which led to an impromptu jam session of the song "That's All Right". During the jam, Marr worked on his chord progression for "Swamp", which inspired the arrangement.

They recall the session as being accompanied by heavy cannabis use. "We used to smoke dope from when we got out of bed to when we got back to bed", recalls Porter, and Marr concurred: "You're from Manchester, you smoke weed till it comes out of your ears." Joyce said the band even replaced the studio's light bulbs with red ones for ambience.

Porter recorded the first takes with microphones set up at varying distances from the band to better create a "swampy" mood. Marr was able to keep the F♯ chord going for as long as 16 bars at a time. Despite only doing a few takes, they had filled an entire reel of tape, as one had gone on for 15 minutes.

Marr and Porter decided to add a tremolo effect to the guitar part. He was inspired by Bo Diddley's distinctive syncopated shuffle guitar style, Hamilton Bohannon's "Disco Stomp" and the two guitars in the instrumental break of Can's "I Want More". The effect was created by running the original guitar track through the studio desk into three separate Fender Twin Reverb amplifiers, each with the tremolo control set to a different oscillation speed. Marr and Porter would adjust each by hand while the music played to keep it in rhythm; when they failed, engineer Mark Wallis would rewind the tape and start them again. Some of these segments were no longer than ten seconds.

To make sure the beat was the same throughout the song, Porter used a Drawmer noise gate triggered by 16th note cowbell hits coming from his LinnDrum. This created what he called "a swirling signal" that balanced the analog tremolo effect. The guitar tracks were then "bounced" down to three of the master recording's 24 available tracks, and the 15-minute version was cut down to eight minutes. This was longer than any previous Smiths song had been. But, Porter told Tony Fletcher, "we looked at each other and said, 'It sounds fucking great; let's keep it like that.'"

The rhythm has been compared to Diddley's "Mona", later covered by the Rolling Stones. After a break, Marr and Porter added a few overdubs, including a slide guitar part that "gave [the song] real tension", according to Marr. It was created using an early harmonizer that was also able to cache 1.2 seconds of delay, a very large amount for the time. Artists had been using it as a sampler; Porter says that he recorded the delay rather than the original to give it some "weirdness". He also says that he played one of the slide guitars; Marr disputes this but gives him credit for his leadership in recording the song.

Marr's other lead guitar part was the harmonic lick after each verse. This is almost a direct quote of a synthetic vibraphone part heard on rapper Lovebug Starski's "You've Gotta Believe", from the previous year. Marr meant it as a direct response to some critics who had pigeonholed the Smiths as 1960s revivalists.

That night Porter sent singer Morrissey a rough mix of the song through his letterbox. The following morning Morrissey arrived and laid down his vocals, culling lyrics from various works in progress in his notebook. According to Porter, Morrissey completed his vocals in two takes.

== Music and lyrics ==
The song contains only one verse, which is repeated twice, plus a chorus and a bridge. The subject is an individual who cannot find a way to overcome his crippling shyness and find a partner. Two passages from the lyric are well known in pop culture – the opening to the verse:

I am the son, and the heir, of a shyness that is criminally vulgar
I am the son and heir, of nothing in particular

and the chorus:

You shut your mouth
How can you say
I go about things the wrong way?
I am human and I need to be loved
Just like everybody else does

The opening was adapted from a line in George Eliot's novel Middlemarch: "To be born the son of a Middlemarch manufacturer, and inevitable heir to nothing in particular". Music journalist Jon Savage commented the song's lyric was evocative of contemporary Manchester gay club culture.

The tune is built around a guitar chord that rapidly oscillates in volume. Explaining how the distinctive resonant sound was achieved, Marr gave the following account in 1990:

The vibrato [tremolo] sound is incredible, and it took a long time. I put down the rhythm track on an Epiphone Casino through a Fender Twin Reverb without vibrato. Then we played the track back through four old Twins, one on each side. We had to keep all the amps vibrating in time to the track and each other, so we had to keep stopping and starting the track, recording it in 10-second bursts... I wish I could remember exactly how we did the slide part – not writing it down is one of the banes of my life! We did it in three passes through a harmonizer, set to some weird interval, like a sixth. There was a different harmonization for each pass. For the line in harmonics, I retuned the guitar so that I could play it all at the 12th fret with natural harmonics. It's doubled several times.

== Release ==
When Rough Trade owner Geoff Travis first heard "How Soon Is Now?", he felt it was too unrepresentative of the Smiths' sound to be released as a single. Despite pressure from Porter to save the song for a later single release as an A-side, "How Soon Is Now?" was included as B-side on the 12-inch single release of "William, It Was Really Nothing" in August 1984. According to Porter: "I thought 'This is it!' ... but I don't think the record company liked it ... They totally threw it away, wasted it." Night-time British radio picked up on the song almost immediately, however, and by autumn it had become the most-requested track on request shows by DJs John Peel, Janice Long, and Annie Nightingale. It was subsequently included on the Smiths' compilation album Hatful of Hollow, released on 2 November 1984. The song was also featured on the soundtrack of the 1986 film Out of Bounds, but was not included on the accompanying soundtrack album.

The song was released on Sire Records in the United States, backed with "Girl Afraid", in November 1984. It was expected to sell well and, for the first time, a video was made to promote one of the band's tracks. However, the song failed to chart. Rough Trade boss Geoff Travis blamed poor promotion: "I can't understand why 'How Soon Is Now?' wasn't a top 10 single, but perhaps I'm being naive. If only their singles had been played on the radio." Morrissey expressed his disappointment in an interview with Creem magazine: "It's hard to believe that 'How Soon Is Now?' was not a hit. I thought that was the one..." "How Soon Is Now?" was released as an A-side in the United Kingdom on 28 January 1985. The 7-inch features an edited version of the track, and the B-side was "Well I Wonder", from the then-about-to-be-released Meat Is Murder album. The 12-inch single includes a new instrumental track, "Oscillate Wildly". It peaked at No. 24 on the UK Singles Chart, a lower placing than the band's three previous singles, which had all hit the Top 20; according to John Porter, "Everybody knew the Smiths' fans already had it."

Following the acquisition of the Rough Trade catalogue by Warner Bros. Records, "How Soon Is Now?" was issued again as a single in the United Kingdom in September 1992. A 7-inch single and cassette featured the edited version, backed with a live version of "Handsome Devil", recorded at The Haçienda on 4 February 1983 (this had originally been the B-side to the Smiths' first single "Hand in Glove"). Two CD singles featured tracks from the Smiths' back-catalogue which were, following the demise of Rough Trade, unavailable in the United Kingdom at that time. The re-issue reached No. 16 on the UK Singles Chart.

== Reception ==
Professional ratings
Review scores
Source	Rating
AllMusic	4/5 stars

"Morrissey and co have once again delved into their Sixties treasure-trove, and produced a visceral power capable of blowing the dust off Eighties inertia. The majestic ease of Morrissey's melancholic vocals are tinted with vitriol, as they move through vistas of misery with plaintive spirals around the pulse of Johnny Marr's tremolo guitar. The string's muted strains conjure wistful signs that bridge the schism between crass sentimentality and callous detachment. Each repeated phrase intensifies the hypnotic waves, with results that outflank anything since 'This Charming Man'. Catharsis has rarely been tinged with so much regret, and shared with so much crystalline purity." – Melody Maker, 2 February 1985

"For the most part, Morrissey is the Hilda Ogden of pop, harassed and hard done-by. I guess what seems like meat to one man sounds like murder to another." – Gavin Martin, New Musical Express, 9 February 1985

=== Rankings in influential music media ===
Publisher	List name	Date	Ranking
Rolling Stone	The 500 Greatest Songs of All Time	2021, 2010, 2004	421, 477, 486
NME	500 Greatest Songs of All Time	January 2014	4
Pitchfork	The 200 Best Songs of the 1980s	August 2015	10
Blender	The 500 Greatest Songs Since You Were Born [i.e. since 1980]	2005	72
WFNX Boston	Top 101 of the Decade (1980s)	1989	1
Rolling Stone	100 Greatest Guitar Songs	2010	90
Q	100 Greatest Guitar Tracks	March 2005	28
NME	50 Greatest Indie Anthems Ever	May 2007	7
VH1	"Top Lyrics" poll	April 2006	Runner-up
Mojo	The Smiths: Their 50 greatest songs	August 2016	1
Uncut	The Smiths' 30 best songs	March 2007	1
Robert Dimery	1001 Songs You Must Hear Before You Die	2010	*
The Guardian	The Smiths: 10 of the best	January 2015	5

* denotes an unordered list.

== Artwork ==
The single's original 1984 US release featured a photo of the band backstage at the 1984 Glastonbury Festival, which had previously appeared on the gatefold inside the Hatful of Hollow compilation, was used instead. It is the only time a portrait of the band has appeared on the cover of one of their releases. Morrissey called it "an abhorrent sleeve – and [given] the time and the dedication that we put into the sleeves and artwork, it was tearful when we finally saw the record..." For the 1985 UK release, the single's cover art was a still from the film Dunkirk (1958) featuring British actor Sean Barrett praying.

== Music video ==
Sire Records made an unauthorised music video to promote the song, which was co-directed by Paula Grief and Richard Levine. It intercut clips of the band playing live (including a shot of Johnny Marr showing Morrissey how to play the guitar), an industrial part of a city, and a girl dancing. The identity of the girl is unknown. This clip uses the US single edit of the song by Phil Brown, which is different to and slightly longer than the UK single edit.

The band were not pleased by the result. Morrissey told Creem in 1985, "We saw the video and we said to Sire, 'You can't possibly release this... this degrading video.' And they said, 'Well, maybe you shouldn't really be on our label.' It was quite disastrous". Nonetheless, the video has been credited with helping make the song their most famous in the United States, along with heavy exposure on college radio.

== Live versions ==
"How Soon Is Now?" was considered a "major problem" to play in concert by the Smiths, and live versions by the Smiths are relatively rare. One live Smiths performance was recorded during the concerts for the live album Rank (1988), but was not used. Instead, a raw version of this song (and entire concert) appeared on the bootleg A Bad Boy from a Good Family, and other versions have appeared on bootleg records such as A Kind of Loving (a rip of a performance in Oxford recorded and broadcast by the BBC). Morrissey revived the song in his own concerts as a solo artist, and it has been a live staple on all of his tours since 2004. A live recording was used to open Morrissey's album Live at Earls Court (2005) and another was to be included on the aborted performance DVD Live at the Hollywood Bowl. The song has also been performed live by Johnny Marr, both solo and with his band the Healers.

== Legacy ==
"The tremolo pulse that opens 'How Soon Is Now?' is the kind of sound musicians and listeners spend a lifetime chasing after: something never heard before and never successfully replicated since." – Philip Sherburne, Pitchfork, 24 August 2015.

Sire Records chief Seymour Stein called it "the 'Stairway to Heaven' of the Eighties".

The whistle effect in Mark Snow's theme for the television series The X-Files was inspired by the song's guitar riff.

In 2022, it was included in the list "The story of NME in 70 (mostly) seminal songs", at No. 24.

== Track listing ==
7-inch RT176
No.	Title	Length
1.	"How Soon Is Now?" (7-inch edit)	3:41
2.	"Well I Wonder"	4:00

- in original green sleeve

12-inch RTT176
No.	Title	Length
1.	"How Soon Is Now?"	6:46
2.	"Well I Wonder"	4:00
3.	"Oscillate Wildly"	3:24

12-inch US RTT176
No.	Title	Length
1.	"How Soon Is Now?"	6:46
2.	"Girl Afraid"	2:46
3.	"How Soon Is Now?" (US edit)	3:53

CD 1 (1992)
No.	Title	Length
1.	"How Soon Is Now?" (7-inch edit)	3:41
2.	"The Queen Is Dead"	6:25
3.	"Handsome Devil" (BBC Radio Session)	2:50
4.	"I Started Something I Couldn't Finish"	3:48

CD 2 (1992)
No.	Title	Length
1.	"I Know It's Over"	5:49
2.	"Suffer Little Children"	5:29
3.	"Back to the Old House"	3:04
4.	"How Soon Is Now?"	6:46

7-inch (1992)
No.	Title	Length
1.	"How Soon Is Now?" (7-inch edit)	3:41
2.	"Hand in Glove" (single version)	3:16

Cassette (1992)
No.	Title	Length
1.	"How Soon Is Now?"	6:46
2.	"Hand in Glove" (single version)	3:16

== Charts ==
Chart (1985)	Peak position
Ireland (IRMA)	5
UK Singles (OCC)	24
UK Indie	1

Chart (1992)	Peak position
Australia (ARIA)	190
Ireland (IRMA)	16
UK Singles (OCC)	16

== Certifications ==
Region	Certification	Certified units/sales
United Kingdom (BPI)	Platinum	600,000^{‡}
^{‡} Sales+streaming figures based on certification alone.

== Cover versions ==
=== Love Spit Love version ===
Near the end of 1995, Psychedelic Furs splinter group Love Spit Love was approached by the music supervisor of the movie The Craft, who inquired if the band might record a cover of the Smiths' "How Soon Is Now?" After initial reluctance, the band recorded the song, and it was released as a single from the movie's soundtrack in 1996.

The song became popular after The WB Television Network utilised the band's cover as the theme song for the witchcraft-themed television series Charmed. It was re-mixed for the show, with different instrumentation and vocals. The song went on to appear on Charmed: The Soundtrack (2003) and as a UK and Australian bonus track on Charmed: The Book of Shadows (2005). Both soundtrack albums charted well in the US, with both reaching the top ten on the Billboard Top Soundtracks chart.

=== Inner Sanctum version ===
A cover by Inner Sanctum reached number six on the Canadian Dance charts in November 1998.

=== Snake River Conspiracy version ===
"How Soon Is Now?"

Single by Snake River Conspiracy

from the album Sonic Jihad
- Released: 5 June 2000
- Length: 3:24
- Label: Reprise
- Composer: Johnny Marr
- Lyricist: Morrissey
- Producers: David Kahne; Jason Slater

Snake River Conspiracy singles chronology
"Vulcan" (1999)	"How Soon Is Now?" (2000)	"Smells Like Teen Punk Meat" (2000)
"Breed" (2000)	"How Soon Is Now?" (2001)

On 5 June 2000, the American industrial rock band Snake River Conspiracy released a cover version of “How Soon Is Now?” as the second single from their debut (and only) full-length album, Sonic Jihad, which charted in the US and the UK.

The single was promoted with an alleged quote from Morrissey praising the song as "Better than the original". Morrissey appeared to confirm this after being sighted at a Snake River Conspiracy concert at the Whiskey a Go Go in late 2000, after which he met the band's singer Tobey Torres. However, he later went on to "sardonically" praise the song as such in an April 2001 interview with Mojo magazine. In response to the Mojo article, "How Soon Is Now?" was reissued as a single in the UK on 2 July 2001.

==== Reception ====
Kerrang! awarded Snake River Conspiracy's cover of "How Soon Is Now?" four stars out of five.

It was successful on several charts. It reached No. 38 on Billboard's Modern Rock Tracks chart, and No. 15 on the Dance Club Songs chart It also charted on the UK Singles Chart, where it reached No. 83. It remains their highest-charting single in the UK.

A remix of Snake River Conspiracy's version was included on the American Eagle Outfitters sampler "Summer 9ine."

==== Charts ====
Chart (2000–2001)	Peak position
UK Singles Chart (OCC)	83
US Dance Club Play (Billboard)	15
US Modern Rock Tracks (Billboard)	38

=== t.A.T.u. version ===
"How Soon Is Now?"
- Standard cover

Single by t.A.T.u.

from the album 200 km/h in the Wrong Lane
- B-side: "Не ве́рь, не бо́йся"
- Released: 23 May 2003
- Length: 3:15
- Label: Universal; Interscope
- Composer: Johnny Marr
- Lyricist: Morrissey
- Producers: Martin Kierszenbaum; Robert Orton

t.A.T.u. singles chronology
"Not Gonna Get Us" (2003)	"How Soon Is Now?" (2003)	"All About Us" (2005)

Music video
- "How Soon Is Now?" on YouTube

Russian recording duo t.A.T.u. covered "How Soon Is Now?" for their debut English language studio album, 200 km/h in the Wrong Lane (2002). Their version was produced by Martin Kierszenbaum and Robert Orton.

The song was released in Europe on 23 May 2003 as the third single from the album. It was not originally the choice for the group's third single. Interscope Records penned the group's "Show Me Love" as the album's third single, however after short notice, the song was dropped for unknown reasons.

The song was available in different formats. The maxi-CD single was released with the group's Eurovision entry, "Ne Ver', Ne Boysia", plus remixes of "30 Minutes" and "Not Gonna Get Us"; this version was released in Australia on 30 June 2003. A promo CD was released in Japan, including "Ya Soshla S Uma" and a remix of "All the Things She Said". It was never commercially released in the United States.

The cover charted in the top ten in Finland (No. 8) and Sweden (No. 10). It debuted at No. 37 in Australia and fell out at No. 43 the next week. An accompanying music video was issued for the group, featuring them performing the song in behind-the-scenes sessions and live performances.

t.A.T.u.'s cover of "How Soon Is Now?" received mixed reviews from music critics, who felt it lacked originality; though compared to other covers, they praised this version as the best. Stephen Thomas Erlewine of Allmusic said the song was one of the highlights of 200 km/h in the Wrong Lane. A reviewer from entertainment.ie said that though the song was a success, "their rather dour delivery suggests that the humour of the original completely passed them by." James Martin from PopDust noted that reactions to t.A.T.u.'s cover were that it was "either completely hideous and should have remained untouched or the best cover the song has ever received".

Todd Burns from Stylus Magazine stated that though it "fails as an independent entity", he found it a highlight and said it was worth a download. Matt Cibula from Popmatters was similar to the PopDust publication, questioning if "people fall all over themselves to either praise or damn the t.A.T.u cover of the Smiths' 'How Soon Is Now', but I can't get worked up one way or the other about it." Cibula concluded that though it's "super-cheesy, which is a good thing", he found it "not as passionate as some people have claimed", criticising the band's vocals.

Of the original creators, Marr found t.A.T.u.'s version "just silly", but Morrissey appeared to view it much more favourably:

Interviewer: Did you hear t.A.T.u's version of 'How Soon Is Now'?

Morrissey: Yes, it was magnificent. Absolutely. Again, I don't know much about them.

Interviewer: They're the teenage Russian lesbians.

Morrissey: Well, aren't we all?

==== Track listings ====
Maxi

1. "How Soon Is Now?" – 3:15
2. "Ne Ver, Ne Boisia" (Eurovision 2003) – 3:02
3. "30 Minutes" (Remix) – 5:52
4. "Not Gonna Get Us" (Hardrum Remix) – 3:50
- Bonus T-shirt transfer

CD single

1. "How Soon Is Now?" – 3:15
2. "Ne Ver, Ne Boisia" (Eurovision 2003) – 3:02

CD3 (Pock-It)

1. "How Soon Is Now?" – 3:15
2. "Not Gonna Get Us" (HarDrum Remix) – 3:50

==== Charts ====
Weekly chart performance for "How Soon Is Now?"
Chart (2003)	Peak position
Australia (ARIA)	37
Austria (Ö3 Austria Top 40)	37
Belgium (Ultratop 50 Flanders)	27
Belgium (Ultratop 50 Wallonia)	27
Finland (Suomen virallinen lista)	8
Germany (GfK)	33
Netherlands (Single Top 100)	20
Sweden (Sverigetopplistan)	10
Switzerland (Schweizer Hitparade)	21

Year-end chart performance for "How Soon Is Now?"
Chart (2003)	Position
Sweden (Hitlistan)	83

=== Other cover versions ===
"How Soon Is Now?" has been covered by various artists. The guitar track was sampled, with the Smiths' approval, in 1990 by indie-dance band Soho on their UK Top 10 single "Hippychick". Artists to have covered the song include UK indie band Hundred Reasons, US post-hardcore band Quicksand (bonus track on their Slip album) in 1993, US post-grunge band Everclear, and US punk band Meatmen (on the Smiths tribute album "The World Still Won't Listen").

British metal band Paradise Lost covered the song as a bonus track on the Japanese edition of their album One Second and it was also released on their single "Say Just Words" from the album as well. The song was also covered by Seattle-based alternative rock band The Crying Spell on their debut album Through Hell to Heaven.

A new cover version by AG feat. Dresage (The Smiths) popped up in the season 4 trailer for the Netflix-series The Crown, bringing this song back to the spotlight after the success of t.A.T.u.'s version.

English singer-songwriter Emma Blackery covered the song for her second studio album, Girl in a Box. The lyrics to the song stayed the same; speaking on X, Emma said she first heard the cover by t.A.T.u in 2002 and she loves the line “I am human and I need to be loved just like everybody else does” and spoke about how it takes on another meaning when you put yourself in the public eye.

== Notes ==
=== References ===
- Fletcher, Tony (2013). A Light That Never Goes Out: the Enduring Saga of the Smiths. London: Windmill Books. ISBN 9780099537922.
- Goddard, Simon (2004). The Smiths – Songs That Saved Your Life. Reynolds & Hearn. ISBN 978-1-903111-84-0.
- Hurwitz, Matt; Knowles, Chris (2008). The Complete X-Files. San Rafael, CA: Insight Editions. ISBN 9781933784724.
- Rogan, Johnny (1994). The Smiths: The Visual Documentary. Omnibus. ISBN 9780711933378.
- Rogan, Johnny (2006). Morrissey: The Albums. Calidore. ISBN 9780952954057.
