= Lemon Love =

Studio album by Aslyn
- Released: March 29, 2005
- Recorded: Real World Studios, Orgasmatron Studios London, Abbey Road Studios, Barefoot Recording Los Angeles
- Genre: Pop
- Length: 45:12
- Label: Capitol
- Producer: Guy Chambers, Richard Flack, Eric Valentine

Aslyn chronology
Lemon Love (2005)	The Grand Garden EP (2008)

Professional ratings
Review scores
Source	Rating
Allmusic	3.5/5 stars

Lemon Love is the debut album recorded by pop singer Aslyn. All songs are written by Aslyn except "Here" which was co-written with her producer, Guy Chambers, and "493–1023" which was co-written with her brother Jeremy Mitchell. In its first week, Lemon Love sold almost 4,000 copies. The album went on to sell over 11,000 copies in the United States, reaching #36 on the Billboard Heatseekers chart.

== Track listing ==
All songs by Aslyn except where noted.

1. "Just Enough" – 4:03
2. "Be The Girl" – 3:00
3. "Gotta Get Over You" – 3:57
4. "493-1023" – 3:42 (Aslyn, Jeremy Mitchell)
5. "Ain't No Love" – 3:29
6. "You Got Me" – 2:52
7. "Lemon Love" – 3:47
8. "Here's to Believe" – 4:22
9. "Rainbow" – 3:26
10. "Golden" – 3:57
11. "Wally" – 4:11
12. "Here" – 4:21 (Aslyn, Guy Chambers)
13. "You Got Me" (Fast Version *Japan bonus track*) (writer unknown)

== In popular culture ==
The song "Be The Girl" can be heard in the video game Bratz: Rock Angelz.
