= So Insane =

Single by Smash Mouth

from the album Summer Girl
- Released: 2006
- Genre: Alternative rock; pop punk
- Length: 2:55
- Label: Beautiful Bomb
- Songwriters: Greg Camp; Paul De Lisle

Smash Mouth singles chronology
"Story of My Life" (2006)	"So Insane" (2006)	"Magic" (2012)

"So Insane" is the second promo single from Smash Mouth's 2006 album, Summer Girl. The promo single contains a radio edit of the song (for US radio) and the album version. Without a music video, or promotion, the single never charted on Billboard's Top 100; however, it did reach position No. 25 on the US Adult Top 40 chart. It was made for the film Zoom.

== Chart performance ==
Chart (2006)	Peak position
US Adult Top 40 (Billboard)	25
