= Notes from the Underworld =

Studio album by Persephone's Bees
- Released: August 29, 2006
- Genre: Pop, pop rock, electropop
- Length: 44:46
- Label: Columbia
- Producer: Eric Valentine

Persephone's Bees chronology
City of Love (2001)	Notes from the Underworld (2006)

Professional ratings
Review scores
Source	Rating
Allmusic	4.5/5 stars
IGN	(7.5/10)

Notes from the Underworld is the major label debut of Oakland electronic pop group Persephone's Bees.

== Track listing ==
1. "Way to Your Heart" – 2:59
2. "Climbing" – 3:07
3. "City of Love" – 4:04
4. "Nice Day" – 4:01
5. "Muzika Dlya Fil'ma" – 5:43
6. "Even Though I'm Fooling Around" – 3:03
7. "On the Earth" – 3:08
8. "Walk to the Moon" – 3:56
9. "Paper Plane" – 3:33
10. "Queen's Night Out" – 4:27
11. "Home" – 6:50
