= Brougham (band) =

American musical group

- Origin: Palo Alto, California, U.S.
- Genres: Hip hop; rap rock; rap metal
- Years active: 1997–2000; 2005–2006
- Labels: Warner Bros.; Megakut
- Past members: Jason Slater; Luke Oakson

Brougham was a short-lived hip hop/rap rock side project founded by Jason Slater and his childhood friend Luke Oakson a.k.a. Luke Sick (Sacred Hoop) in Palo Alto, California, USA. Brougham recorded an album, Le Cock Sportif, for Warner Bros. Records in 2000 but the album was a commercial flop. Spin Magazine named the album title the "worst rap-rock album title" ever.

One of their tracks, titled "I Walked In," appeared on the soundtrack for the 1998 movie Can't Hardly Wait. It also appeared in the 2000 film Playing Mona Lisa.

Brougham attempted to work on a second album during 2005 and 2006, though this was never completed. Following Jason Slater's death in 2020, the demos for the second album were released under the name Bateh. Bros. on July 12, 2022, through Oakson's record label, Megakut Records.

== Discography ==
Studio albums

- Le Cock Sportif (May 30, 2000)
- Bateh Bros. (July 12, 2022)
