= Sonic Jihad (Snake River Conspiracy album) =

2000 studio album by Snake River Conspiracy

Studio album by Snake River Conspiracy
- Released: July 11, 2000
- Recorded: 1998–2000
- Studio: H.O.S. Recording Studio, Redwood City, California; Scream Studios, Los Angeles, California
- Genre: Industrial rock
- Length: 44:48
- Label: Reprise; Morpheus (UK)
- Producer: Jason Slater; David Kahne; Eric Valentine; Charlie Clouser

Snake River Conspiracy chronology
Vulcan (1999)	Sonic Jihad (2000)	Smells Like Teen Punk Meat (2000)

Singles from Sonic Jihad
- 1. "Vulcan" Released: October 5, 1999; 2. "How Soon Is Now?" Released: June 5, 2000 (Note: Released in the UK on July 2, 2001); 3. "Breed" Released: November 13, 2000 (Note: Reissued on March 13, 2001)

Sonic Jihad is the debut studio album by American industrial rock band Snake River Conspiracy, released in the United States on July 11, 2000, by Reprise Records, and in the UK on November 13, 2000, through Morpheus Records, an imprint label of Reprise.

Besides six original songs, Sonic Jihad contains five covers; "You and Your Friend" by T-Ride, "Lovesong" by The Cure, "How Soon is Now?" by The Smiths, and "Act Your Age" and "Oh Well" by Running with Scissors.

Sonic Jihad garnered mostly positive reviews from critics, who praised the album's aggressive and inventive production and Tobey Torres' vocal performances. Three singles were released from the album: "Vulcan", "How Soon is Now?" and "Breed". "How Soon is Now?" and "Breed" charted in the US.

== Commercial performance ==
Three singles were released, all of which charted. The first single, “Vulcan,” charted on the “Hot Dance Music Maxi Singles Sales” chart, reaching number 37. The next single, "How Soon Is Now," performed well in the United States, where it reached No. 38 on the Alternative chart and #15 on the Dance Club Songs chart; the song also entered the UK Singles Chart, at number 83. The third single, "Breed", reached No. 37 on the Dance Club Songs chart.

== Critical reception ==
Professional ratings
Review scores
Source	Rating
AllMusic	3/5 stars
Drowned in Sound	9/10
The Independent	4/5 stars
Kerrang!	4/5 stars
Metal Hammer	10/10
NME	5/10
Outburn	(positive)
PopMatters	(positive)
Q	3/5 stars
Rock Sound	3.5/5 stars

Sonic Jihad received generally positive reviews from music critics.

Eden Miller of PopMatters spoke positively of the album, stating that, "Anger has never been so much fun or so approachable," and praising the group's "strong personality". Drowned in Sound's review, written by Kate Price, was similarly positive, awarding the album 9 out of 10 and stating that the album, "Is a journey, lyrically and musically, through human emotions and represents... the triumph of passion over technology."

Sonic Jihad was widely praised in the British rock and heavy metal press. Roberto Cannelloni of Metal Hammer praised the album's inventiveness and Tobey Torres' vocal performances, which he labelled "works of genius full of twisted keyboards and buzzsaw guitars layered underneath probably the finest voice in rock today" and awarded the album a perfect score. Dave Everly of Kerrang! hailed the album as "A vitriolic blast of venomous post-techno noise rock". Johnathan Long of Rock Sound stated that while Snake River Conspiracy's initiative of using 1980s music as inspiration was not exactly original, citing the bands Orgy and VAST as other contemporary examples, the band retained a "visceral edge to their music" and called the album a "surprisingly delightful debut".

Other reviewers were less favourable. AllMusic's William Ruhlmann likened Snake River Conspiracy to the rock group Garbage and Nine Inch Nails, but felt that, "Their sound may be too hard for pop fans and too soft for rock fans," which lead him to giving the album 3 out of 5 stars. NME writer Darren Johns was critical of the album's gothic undertones and "Dark Mood Syndrome", which he felt undermined the album's "shiny, happy chorus hooks", but also praised the songs "Somebody Hates You" and "How Soon Is Now?", which he called "the oddest, and therefore best, moments" on the album.

=== Accolades ===
Publication	Country	Accolade	Year	Rank
Kerrang!	United Kingdom	Kerrang! Albums of the Year	2000	7

== Track listing ==
No.	Title	Writer(s)	Producer(s)	Length
1.	"Breed"	Jason Slater; Eric Valentine; Denny Porter; Tobey Torres^{[a]}; Jerry Goldsmith	Jason Slater; Eric Valentine; David Kahne	4:30
2.	"Casualty"	Slater; Valentine; Porter	Slater; Valentine; Kahne	4:54
3.	"You and Your Friend" (T-Ride cover)	Daniel Arlie	Slater; Valentine; Kahne	3:35
4.	"Lovesong" (The Cure cover)	Robert Smith; Simon Gallup; Roger O'Donnell; Porl Thompson; Boris Williams; Lol Tolhurst; Slater^{[a]}; Valentine^{[a]}; Porter^{[a]}	Slater; Valentine	3:56 (Note: Although the 3:56 version of "Lovesong" is included on the album, a full-length version (4:08) also exists.)
5.	"Act Your Age" (Running with Scissors cover)	Slater; Porter	Slater; Kahne	4:27
6.	"More Than Love"	Slater; Valentine; Porter	Slater; Valentine; Kahne	3:50
7.	"Strangled" (featuring Greg Camp^{[a]})	Slater; Valentine; Porter; John Barry	Slater; Valentine; Kahne	4:43
8.	"Oh Well" (Running with Scissors cover)	Slater; Porter; Charlie Clouser	Slater; Charlie Clouser	3:46
9.	"Somebody Hates You"	Slater; Valentine; Porter; David Kahne	Slater; Valentine; Kahne	3:57
10.	"Vulcan"	Slater; Valentine	Slater; Valentine	3:59
11.	"How Soon Is Now?" (The Smiths cover)	Morrissey; Johnny Marr	Slater; Kahne	3:23
Total length:				44:48

Notes

- ^{^[a]} signifies an uncredited songwriter/contributor

Sample credits

- "Breed" contains a sample from "New Identity", written by Jerry Goldsmith, and featured in the score for the 1968 film Planet of the Apes.
- "Strangled" contains a sample from "Goldfinger", written by John Barry, Leslie Bricusse, Anthony Newley (credited only to Barry in liner notes), and performed by Shirley Bassey.

== Personnel ==
Personnel per liner notes.

Snake River Conspiracy
- Jason Slater – bass, guitar, instruments, production, songwriting (all tracks),
  mixing (1–7, 9, 11)
- Tobey Torres – vocals, lyrical contributions (uncredited)

Additional personnel

- Geoff Tyson – additional production (uncredited), remixes
- Michael Urbano – drums (uncredited)
- Greg Camp – guitar solo on "Strangled" (uncredited)

Artwork

- Michael Kahne – art direction, design, illustrations
- Stephen Lee – photography
- Melaine Nissen – photography
Production
- Eric Valentine – production, engineering, songwriting (1–4, 6–7, 9–10), mixing (4, 10)
- David Kahne – production, mixing, engineering, overdubs, orchestral arrangements, songwriting (1–3, 5–7, 9, 11)
- Charlie Clouser – production, mixing (8)
- Rob Brill – engineering (uncredited)
- Krish Sharma – mixing (1, 2, 7, 9)
- Doug Trantow – mixing (5)
- Brian Gardener – mastering (at Bernie Grundman Mastering)

Management

- Eric Gotland – management (at EGM Management)
- Dusty Sorenson – management (at EGM Management)
- David Kahne – A&R

== Use in media ==
"Breed" is used in the 2001 film Valentine during the end credits. The "Prince Quick Mix's Cracker Beat Pass Mix" of "How Soon Is Now" was included on the American Eagle Outfitters compilation Summer 9ine. “Lovesong” features in an episode of HBO's The Sopranos.

== Charts ==
Chart performance for Sonic Jihad
Chart (2000)	Position
US Heatseekers Albums (Billboard)	36

== Release history ==
Country	Date	Format	Label	Catalog #	Ref.
United States	July 11, 2000	CD; cassette	Reprise Records	9 47383–2	
Canada	July 11, 2000	CD	Reprise Records	CDW 47383	
Europe	July 11, 2000	CD	Reprise Records	9362- 47701–2	
United Kingdom	November 13, 2000	CD	Morpheus Records	Morph 008	
