= Eric Valentine =

American record producer

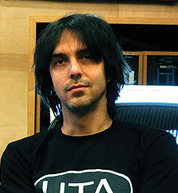
Valentine in 2010

Eric Dodd, known professionally as Eric Valentine, is an American record producer who began his career as drummer and producer in the heavy metal band T-Ride.

He subsequently produced albums for artists such as Good Charlotte, Lostprophets, Taking Back Sunday, Nickel Creek, Queens of the Stone Age, Third Eye Blind, Smash Mouth, The All-American Rejects, Persephone's Bees, and Slash, among others.

== Early life ==
Valentine's first experience with music was listening to The Monkees as a child and wanting to play drums. He received a three-piece drum set from a garage sale, leading to him taking drum lessons at the age of 9. Around that same time, Eric started listening to bands such as Led Zeppelin, AC/DC and Kiss, along with jazz fusion bands such as Weather Report from drum teachers. His father's career as an aerospace engineer was enough for him to get a four-track and learn on his own.

== Career and equipment development ==
Beginning in 2007, Valentine worked with technician Larry Jasper to build a custom recording console after growing dissatisfied with commercial consoles that did not suit his workflow; the project grew out of Jasper's earlier work modifying Valentine's vintage outboard gear. After the console was completed in 2009, other engineers expressed interest in its equalizer design, leading Valentine to develop it into a commercial product and found the pro-audio manufacturer UnderToneAudio.

== Personal life ==
Valentine married Grace Potter in 2017 and they have a son born in 2018.

== Discography ==
- T-Ride – T-Ride (drummer/backing vocals/producer/mixing; 1992)
- The Conscious Daughters – Ear to the Street (engineer/instrumentation; 1993)
- Paris – Guerrilla Funk (engineer; 1994)
- Joe Satriani – Joe Satriani (engineer on "Luminous Flesh Giants" and "Look My Way", piano/additional engineering on "Cool #9", bass/keyboards/percussion on "Luminous Flesh Giants"; 1995)
- The Conscious Daughters – Gamers (mixing engineer; 1996)
- Dwarves – The Dwarves Are Young and Good Looking (producer/mixing/voice actor; 1997)
- Third Eye Blind – Third Eye Blind (programming on "Semi-Charmed Life" and "Motorcycle Drive By", piano on "Thanks a Lot" and "God of Wine", guitar/keyboards/programming on "I Want You", engineer/co-producer/mixing; 1997)
- Smash Mouth – Fush Yu Mang (keyboards/percussion/groovy noises/engineer/producer/mixing; 1997)
- The Braids – Here We Come (arrangements/programming/engineer/producer; 1998)
- Joe Satriani – Crystal Planet (drums/percussion/producer on "Psycho Monkey", bass/drums/keyboards/percussion/engineer/producer/mixing on "Time"; 1998)
- Brougham – "I Walked In" (mixing; 1998)
- Vital Information – Where We Come From (mixing; 1998)
- Tom Coster – From the Street (mixing; 1999)
- Smash Mouth – Astro Lounge (additional keyboards/vibraphone/engineer/producer/mixing; 1999)
- Citizen King – Mobile Estates (engineer/producer/mixing; 1999)
- Snake River Conspiracy – Sonic Jihad (producer; 2000)
- Dwarves – Come Clean (engineer/producer/mixing; 2000)
- Deathray – Deathray (synthesizer/keyboards/producer; 2000)
- Smash Mouth – Smash Mouth (writer on "She Turns Me On", engineer/producer/mixing; 2001)
- Scapegoat Wax – Okeeblow (engineer/producer/mixing on "Space to Share" and "Perfect Silence", writer on "Perfect Silence"; 2001)
- Queens of the Stone Age – Songs for the Deaf (producer except "The Sky Is Fallin'" and "Do It Again"; 2002)
- Good Charlotte – The Young and the Hopeless (writer on "A New Beginning", string arrangement/engineer/producer/mixing; 2002)
- Kelly Osbourne – "Papa Don't Preach" (producer; 2002)
- Lostprophets – Start Something (engineer/producer/mixing; 2004)
- John Fogerty – Deja Vu All Over Again (mixing/additional parts on "She's Got Baggage"; 2004)
- Good Charlotte – The Chronicles of Life and Death (writer on "Once Upon a Time: The Battle of Life and Death", string arrangement/mastering/engineer/producer/mixing; 2004)
- Dwarves – The Dwarves Must Die (engineer/producer/mixing; 2004)
- Skye Sweetnam – Noise from the Basement (writer on "Number One"; 2004)
- Nickel Creek – Why Should the Fire Die? (mastering/engineer/producer/mixing; 2005)
- Aslyn – Lemon Love (producer on "Be the Girl", "493-1023", "Ain't No Love", and "You Got Me"; 2005)
- Taking Back Sunday – Louder Now (engineer/producer/mixing; 2006)
- Smash Mouth – Summer Girl (engineer/producer/mixing on "So Insane", "Story of My Life", and "Right Side, Wrong Bed", drum producer/mixing for "Everyday Superhero", vocal producer for "Quality Control"; 2006)
- Mellowdrone – Box (engineer on "Oh My", "Four Leaf Clover", "Fashionably Uninvited", "Fuck It Man", and "Whatever the Deal"; 2006)
- Persephone's Bees – Notes from the Underworld (drums/mastering/engineer/producer/mixing; 2006)
- Aqualung – Memory Man (additional production/mixing; 2007)
- Hot Hot Heat – Happiness Ltd. (producer/mixing on "5 Times Out of 100"; 2007)
- Maroon 5 – It Won't Be Soon Before Long (engineer/producer/mixing on "Little of Your Time" and "Can't Stop"; 2007)
- Jesca Hoop – Kismet (additional engineering; 2007)
- The All-American Rejects – When the World Comes Down (drum corp/orchestration composer on "Real World", programming/engineer/producer/mixing; 2008)
- Tracy Hamlin – Better Days (instruments/engineer/producer on "Free"; 2009)
- Jackiem Joyner – Lil' Man Soul (drums on "Take Me There"; 2009)
- Theo Tams – Give It All Away (writer on "Wait for You"; 2009)
- Slash – Slash (piano on "Ghost", keyboards on "I Hold On", engineer/producer/mixing; 2010)
- Steve Lukather – All's Well That Ends Well (writer on "Tumescent (Instrumental)", drums; 2010)
- Chris Standring – Blue Bolero (drums on "Please Mind the Gap" and "March of the Bowler Hats"; 2011)
- Taking Back Sunday – Taking Back Sunday (engineer/producer/mixing; 2011)
- Dwarves – The Dwarves Are Born Again (editor/mastering/engineer/mixing; 2011)
- The Wombats – This Modern Glitch (engineer/producer/mixing on "Tokyo (Vampires & Wolves)" and "1996", vocals on "1996", additional production/engineer on "Techno Fan"; 2011)
- Slash – Apocalyptic Love (writer on "No More Heroes", producer; 2012)
- Smash Mouth – Magic (engineer/producer/mixing on "Don't You (Forget About Me)"; 2012)
- Steve Lukather – Transition (drums on "Last Man Standing", "Do I Stand Alone", and "Rest of the World"; 2013)
- Blag Dahlia – "Metrosexual Man" (drums/vocals on "Metrosexual Man", mixing on "Metrosexual Man" and "The Simple Life"; 2013)
- Dwarves – The Dwarves Invented Rock & Roll (mastering; 2014)
- Nickel Creek – A Dotted Line (percussion/mastering/engineer/producer/mixing; 2014)
- 5 Seconds of Summer – 5 Seconds of Summer (mastering/additional production/mixing on "She Looks So Perfect"; 2014)
- The Madden Brothers – Greetings from California (producer on side A; 2014)
- Supersuckers – Get the Hell (mastering; 2014)
- Nightmare and the Cat – Simple (mastering/engineer/producer/mixing; 2014)
- 5 Seconds of Summer – Sounds Good Feels Good (mastering/mixing; 2015)
- The Wombats – Glitterbug (engineer/producer; 2015)
- Grace Potter – Midnight (producer/mixing; 2015)
- Richard Elliot – Summer Madness (drums; 2016)
- Peter White – Groovin' (drums on "When Will I See You Again"; 2016)
- Good Charlotte – Youth Authority (mixing on "Makeshift Love"; 2016)
- Grace VanderWaal – Perfectly Imperfect (mastering; 2016)
- Gwen Stefani – You Make It Feel Like Christmas (editing/engineer/lap steel guitar/percussion/producer; 2017)
- Death from Above 1979 – Outrage! Is Now (producer; 2017)
- Weezer – Pacific Daydream (mixing on "Mexican Fender", "Beach Boys" and tracks 4-10/mastering; 2017)
- The Story So Far – Proper Dose (mixing; 2018)

== See also ==
- Category:Albums produced by Eric Valentine
