= Zoom (2006 film) =

2006 film by Peter Hewitt

- Theatrical release poster
- Directed by: Peter Hewitt
- Screenplay by: Adam Rifkin; David Berenbaum
- Story by: Adam Rifkin
- Based on: Amazing Adventures from Zoom's Academy by Jason Lethcoe
- Produced by: Suzanne Todd; Jennifer Todd; Todd Garner
- Starring: Tim Allen; Courteney Cox; Chevy Chase; Spencer Breslin; Rip Torn
- Cinematography: David Tattersall
- Edited by: Lawrence Jordan
- Music by: Christophe Beck
- Production companies: Columbia Pictures; Revolution Studios; Team Todd Productions; Boxing Cat Films
- Distributed by: Sony Pictures Releasing
- Release date: August 11, 2006
- Running time: 88 minutes
- Country: United States
- Language: English
- Budget: $75.6 million
- Box office: $12.5 million

Zoom (also known as Zoom: Academy for Superheroes) is a 2006 American superhero comedy film based on the children's book Amazing Adventures from Zoom's Academy by Jason Lethcoe. The film was directed by Peter Hewitt and written by Adam Rifkin and David Berenbaum, with writing assistance from Tim Allen, who stars alongside Courteney Cox, Chevy Chase, Spencer Breslin, and Rip Torn. It features a former superhero who is dragged into training four superpowered youths to become superheroes and combat an approaching threat.

Released theatrically on August 11, 2006, by Sony Pictures Releasing, the film received negative reviews and was a box office failure, as it grossed just $12.5 million on a $75.6 million budget. At the 27th Golden Raspberry Awards, Zoom was nominated for one Razzie Award, which was Worst Actor for Tim Allen (who was also nominated for The Santa Clause 3: The Escape Clause and The Shaggy Dog), but he lost to Marlon and Shawn Wayans for Little Man (also produced by Columbia Pictures and Revolution Studios).

== Plot ==
Thirty years prior, Team Zenith, a government-sponsored superhero team led by the Shepard brothers Jack / "Captain Zoom" and Connor / "Concussion", fought to protect the world from various threats until the U.S. military used experimental "Gamma-13" radiation to enhance the Shepards' powers. As a result, Jack became faster and stronger, but Concussion suffered a psychotic break and killed his teammates. Jack seemingly killed Concussion in turn via a vortex, but lost his powers in the process.

At present, original Zenith Project scientist Dr. Ed Grant discovers Concussion was trapped in a dimensional rift and is returning to Earth. Zenith military officer General Larraby commissions the formation of a new Team Zenith, recruiting a reluctant long-retired Jack as an instructor and Marsha Holloway, a clumsy psychologist and a fan of the original Team Zenith's comic books.

Following a round of auditions, the Zenith Project recruits teenagers Dylan West and Summer Jones and children Tucker Williams and Cindy Collins, who possess invisibility, psionic powers, self-inflation, and super-strength respectively. Over the course of the team's training, Marsha and the recruits become disappointed by Jack's bitter and sarcastic personality, Dylan mounts failed escape attempts, and Tucker struggles with self-esteem issues and controlling his powers. After the team confronts Jack over his failings, they reconcile and slowly improve their abilities.

Hours before Concussion's return, Jack helps Dylan unlock a new ability dubbed "mindsight", which he uses to pinpoint where Concussion will emerge and learn the military intends to expose the new Team Zenith to Gamma-13 and use them as a distraction so they can test new weaponry on Concussion. A horrified Jack asks Marsha to help him rescue the children and travel to Concussion's location, during which she reveals her ability to produce super-breath. Upon arriving, Jack resolves to face Concussion alone, but Marsha and Team Zenith refuse to abandon him.

When Concussion returns, Larraby fires a neutralizing net at him, but the former blasts it away towards Cindy. Fearing for her safety, Jack's powers return, allowing him to save her before he uses his speed and Gamma-13 to recreate the vortex while Team Zenith and Marsha guide Concussion into it. After Grant reveals he can save Concussion, Jack closes the vortex, with the subsequent energy vacuum draining the Shepards' Gamma-13, curing Concussion.

Three months later, Team Zenith has returned to their normal lives while continuing to work with Jack, having become Zoom once again.

== Cast ==
- Tim Allen as Jack Shepard / Captain Zoom, Connor's younger brother and an ex-superhero with superhuman speed.
- Courteney Cox as Dr. Marsha Holloway, a psychologist on the Zenith Project who blows rainbow-colored blasts of wind.
- Chevy Chase as Dr. Ed Grant, a scientist on the Zenith Project.
- Rip Torn as General Larraby, the head of the Zenith Project.
- Ryan Newman as Cindy Collins / Princess, a 6-year-old girl with superhuman strength.
- Spencer Breslin as Tucker Williams / Mega Boy, an overweight 12-year-old boy who can enlarge and inflate his body parts at will.
- Michael Cassidy as Dylan West / Houdini, a 17-year-old boy with invisibility and clairvoyance.
- Kate Mara as Summer Jones / Wonder, a 16-year-old girl who possesses telekinesis and empathic senses.
- Kevin Zegers as Connor Shepard / Concussion, Jack's older brother with concussive blasts who went insane upon being exposed to Gamma-13.
- Cornelia Guest as Mrs. Collins, Cindy's mother
- Ridge Canipe and Danny McCarthy as Bullies
- Thomas F. Wilson as Dylan's teacher
- David Lander as David, an employee at Wendy's.

== Production ==
In June 2003, Revolution Studios acquired the rights to Zoom's Academy for the Super Gifted by former Disney/Warner Bros. animator Jason Lethcoe. Peter Hewitt became attached as director in September 2004.

Tim Allen helped write the initial script, saying "It was very different in script form, much darker than when it came out, and what the studio and powers that be decided to make it into a family movie; It was a neat idea of what superheroes are really capable of doing."

== Release ==
=== Theatrical ===
Zoom was theatrically released on August 11, 2006, by Columbia Pictures.

=== Home media ===
Zoom was released on DVD on February 13, 2007, by Sony Pictures Home Entertainment under the name Zoom: Academy for Superheroes.

== Reception ==
=== Box office ===
Zoom opened in 2,501 theaters on August 11, 2006, and earned $4.5 million in its opening weekend ranking number nine at the domestic box office. At the end of its run, on September 17, the film had grossed $12 million in the United States and Canada and $516,860 internationally for a worldwide total of $12.5 million.

=== Critical response ===
On the review aggregator website Rotten Tomatoes, 5% of 66 critics' reviews are positive, with an average rating of 3.2/10. The website's consensus reads: "Lacking the punch and good cheer of The Incredibles and Sky High, Zoom is a dull and laugh-free affair." Metacritic, which uses a weighted average, assigned the film a score of 26 out of 100, based on 14 critics, indicating "generally unfavorable" reviews. Audiences polled by CinemaScore gave the film an average grade of "B−" on an A+ to F scale.

=== Awards ===
List of awards and nominations
Award	Category	Nominee	Result
Razzie Award	Worst Actor	Tim Allen (Also for The Santa Clause 3: The Escape Clause and The Shaggy Dog)	Nominated
Stinkers Bad Movie Awards	Worst Picture	Zoom (Sony/Revolution)	Nominated
Stinkers Bad Movie Awards	Worst Actor	Tim Allen (Also for The Santa Clause 3: The Escape Clause and The Shaggy Dog)	Won
Stinkers Bad Movie Awards	Worst Supporting Actor	Chevy Chase (Also for Doogal)	Won
Stinkers Bad Movie Awards	Worst Supporting Actress	Courteney Cox	Nominated
Stinkers Bad Movie Awards	Worst Screenplay	Adam Rifkin; David Berenbaum	Nominated
Stinkers Bad Movie Awards	Most Intrusive Musical Score	Christophe Beck	Nominated
Stinkers Bad Movie Awards	The Spencer Breslin Award (for Worst Performance by a Child in a Feature Role)	Spencer Breslin (Also for The Santa Clause 3: The Escape Clause and The Shaggy Dog)	Won
Stinkers Bad Movie Awards	Worst Ensemble	Zoom	Nominated
Stinkers Bad Movie Awards	Foulest Family Film	Zoom	Won
Stinkers Bad Movie Awards	Least "Special" Special Effects	Zoom	Nominated
Young Artist Award	Best Performance in a Feature Film - Young Actress Age Ten or Younger	Ryan Newman	Nominated

== Music ==
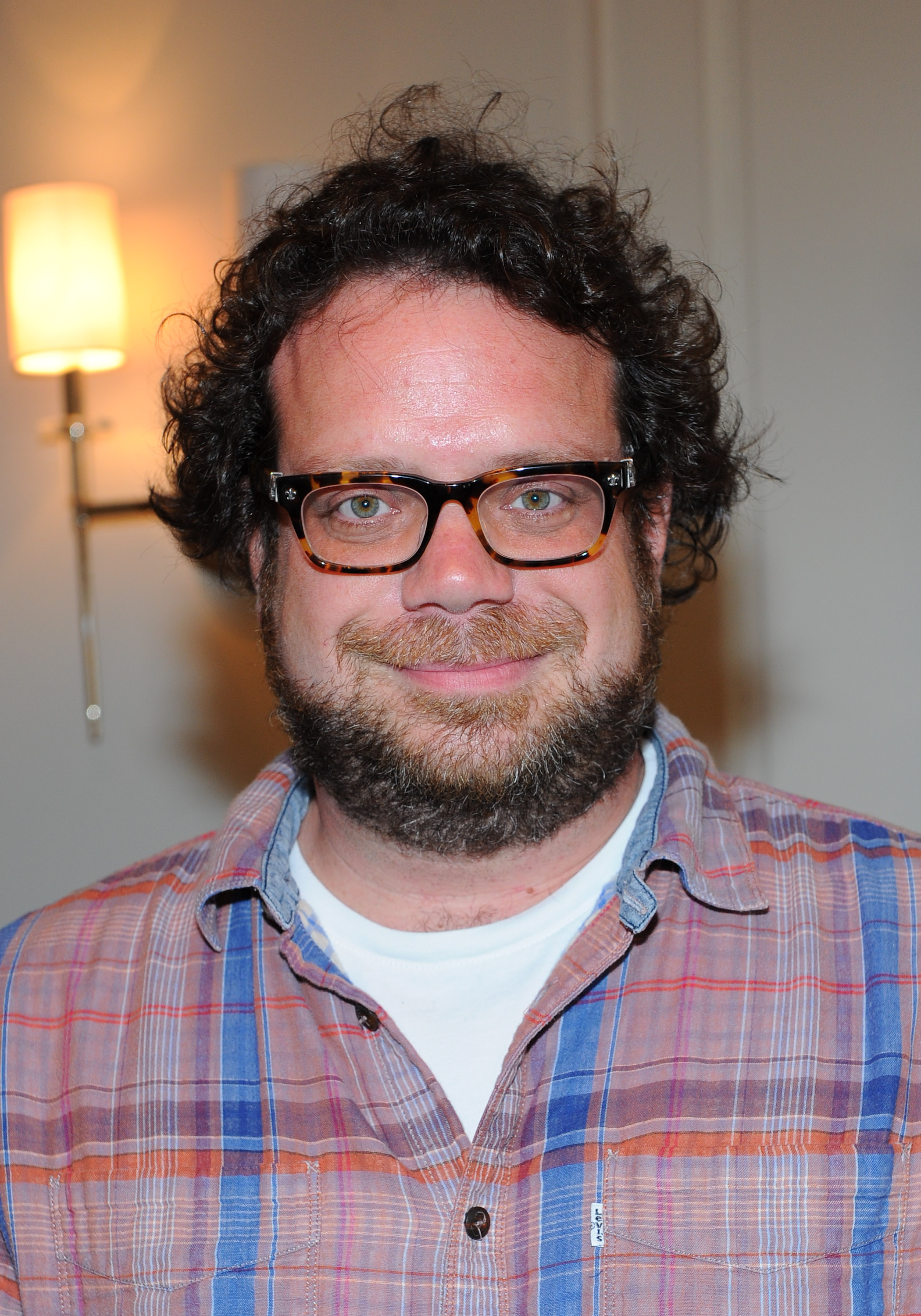
Christophe Beck scored the music for the film and on its soundtrack.

Rupert Gregson-Williams was originally attached to compose the film, but dropped out to work on Over the Hedge, and Christophe Beck stepped in. Beck scored the music for the film and on its soundtrack.

=== Soundtrack ===
Although an official movie soundtrack was not released, the following songs were heard during the film:

- "So Insane" – Smash Mouth
- "Hang On" – Smash Mouth
- "Everyday Superhero" – Smash Mouth
- "Come On Come On" – Smash Mouth
- "Punk Rock 101" – Bowling for Soup
- "The World is New" – Save Ferris
- "Under Pressure" – Queen and David Bowie, cover by Smash Mouth
- "Superman (It's Not Easy)" – Five for Fighting
- "The Middle" – Jimmy Eat World
- "Hero" – Enrique Iglesias
- "Days Like These" – Smash Mouth
- "The Good, the Bad and the Ugly" – Prague Philharmonic Orchestra
- "If She Knew What She Wants" – The Bangles
- "Big Ups" – Triniti Bhaguandas (as Ms. Triniti)
- "It's On" – Superchick
