= Jason Slater =

American record producer (1971–2020)

- Jason Slater in 2000

Background information
- Born: Jason C. Slater; March 8, 1971; Stoneham, Massachusetts, U.S.
- Origin: San Francisco Bay Area, California, U.S.
- Died: December 9, 2020 (aged 49) Maui, Hawaii, U.S.
- Genres: Heavy metal; nu metal; alternative metal; industrial rock; alternative rock; rap rock
- Occupation: Musician record producer
- Instrument: Bass guitar
- Years active: 1991–2020
- Formerly of: Third Eye Blind; Snake River Conspiracy; Brougham; Revenge of the Triads

Jason C. Slater (March 8, 1971 – December 9, 2020) was an American record producer and musician. Slater was an original bassist for Third Eye Blind as well as a member of Snake River Conspiracy, Brougham and Revenge of the Triads.

== Biography ==
Slater grew up in Palo Alto, California, where he helped form the bands Third Eye Blind, Brougham and Snake River Conspiracy. He is best known for being the co-founder, bassist and backup vocalist of Third Eye Blind from 1993 to 1994. He left the band after its first year. Following his departure from Third Eye Blind, Slater co-founded the rap rock band Brougham with Luke Oakson and the industrial rock band Snake River Conspiracy with Eric Valentine. He was also a member of two supergroups; "Band of Flakes" (with George Lynch), and Revenge of the Triads (with Charlie Clouser and Troy Van Leeuwen).

Outside of his work in bands, Slater produced several albums. He produced five albums for progressive metal band Queensrÿche between 2006 and 2013.

A book on Slater's life and career, Jason Slater: For the Sake of Supposing, was released on March 8, 2025, via Breakdown Room Publishing, LLC.

== Death ==
On December 9, 2020, Slater died from liver failure at a Maui, Hawaii hospital. He was 49 years old.

== Discography ==
List of albums with contributions from Jason Slater
Year	Artist	Album	Producer	Mixing	Engineer	Writing	Instr.	Ref.
1997	Bullmark	Interstate '76 soundtrack	Yes	No	No	Yes	Yes	
1998	The Braids	Here We Come	No	No	No	Yes	No	
2000	Brougham	Le Cock Sportif	Yes	Yes	Yes	Yes	Yes	
2000	Snake River Conspiracy	Sonic Jihad	Yes	Yes	No	Yes	Yes	
2001	Pete	pete.	Yes	No	No	No	No	
2002	Earshot	Letting Go	Yes	No	No	No	No	
2002	Edify	Edify	Yes	No	No	No	No	
2003	Slaves on Dope	Metafour	Yes	Yes	No	No	No	
2003	Twisted Method	Escape From Cape Coma	Yes	No	No	No	No	
2003	Stimulator	Stimulator	No	No	No	Yes	No	
2004	P.M.T.	Acupuncture for the Soul	Yes	Yes	No	No	No	
2005	Enemy	Hooray for Dark Matter	Yes	Yes	Yes	Yes	No	
2006	Queensrÿche	Operation: Mindcrime II	Yes	Yes	No	Yes	Yes	
2006	Temple of Brutality	Lethal Agenda	No	Yes	No	No	No	
2007	Queensrÿche	Mindcrime at the Moore	No	No	Yes	Yes	Yes	
2007	Queensrÿche	Take Cover	Yes	No	Yes	No	No	
2009	Queensrÿche	American Soldier	Yes	No	No	Yes	No	
2010	Ingrid Michaelson	Human Again	No	No	No	No	Yes	
2011	Queensrÿche	Dedicated to Chaos	Yes	No	No	Yes	No	
2013	Geoff Tate's Queensrÿche	Frequency Unknown	Yes	Yes	Yes	Yes	Yes	
2015	Operation: Mindcrime	The Key	No	No	Yes	No	No	
2022	Brougham	Bateh Bros.	Yes	Yes	Yes	Yes	Yes	

Unreleased albums

List of unreleased albums with contributions from Jason Slater
Artist	Album	Producer	Mixer	Engineer	Writing	Instr.
Revenge of the Triads	Unfinished debut album	Yes	Yes	Yes	Yes	Yes
Prizefighter	Prizefighter	Yes	No	No	No	No
Apartment 26	Detachment	Yes	No	No	No	No
Snake River Conspiracy	SRC2	Yes	Yes	Yes	Yes	Yes
