= Paul De Lisle =

Canadian musician and songwriter (born 1963)

Paul DeLisle
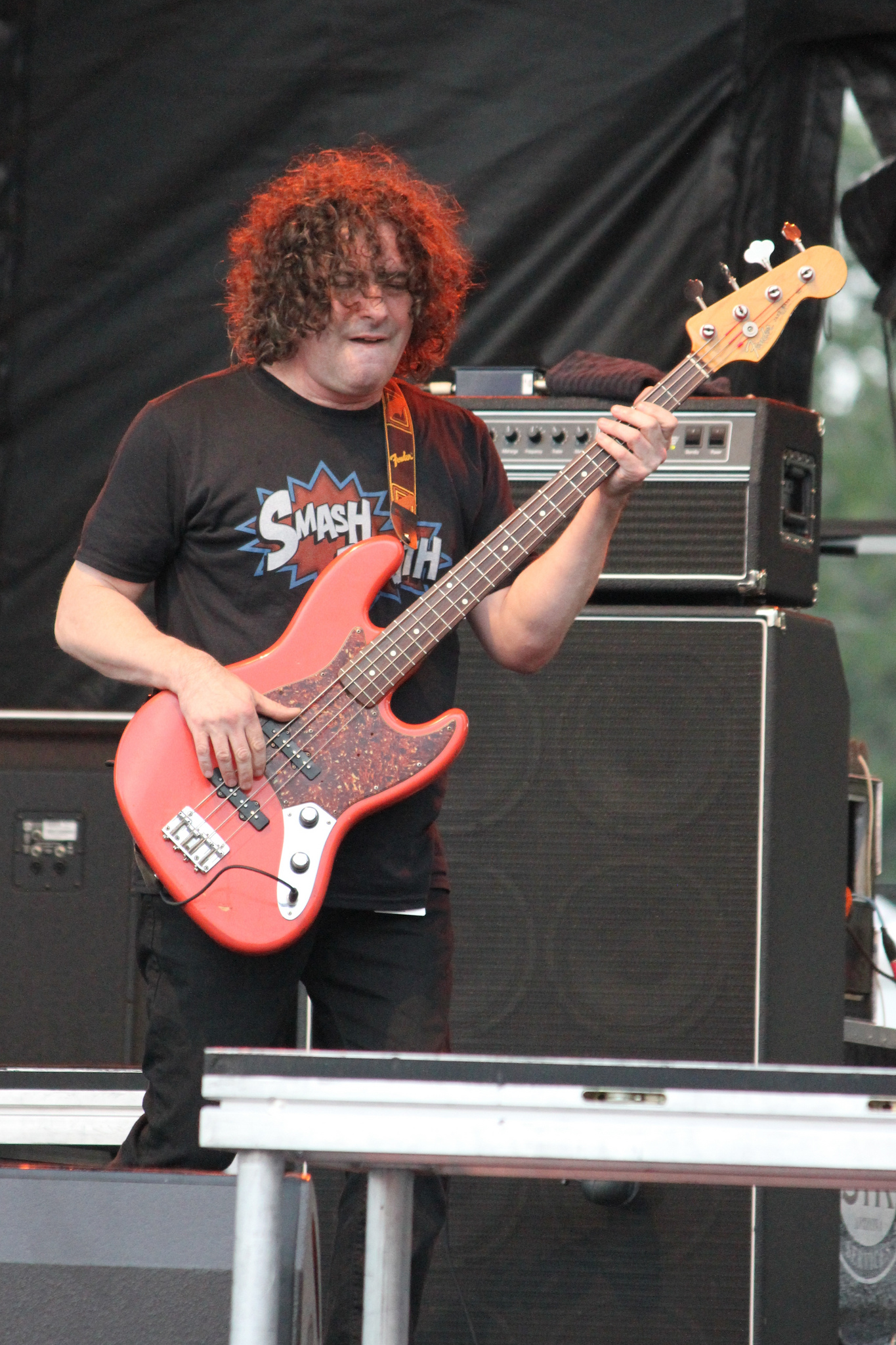
- Paul De Lisle performing with Smash Mouth in 2014

Background information
- Born: Paul Gerald DeLisle; June 13, 1963 (age 63); Exeter, Ontario, Canada
- Genres: Alternative rock; pop punk; pop rock; ska punk
- Occupations: Bassist; vocalist; songwriter
- Instruments: Bass; vocals
- Years active: 1990–present
- Member of: Smash Mouth
- Spouse: Grey DeLisle

Paul Gerald De Lisle (born June 13, 1963) is a Canadian-American musician and songwriter. He is the bassist and the last original member of the pop rock band Smash Mouth since their formation in 1994.

== Early life and education ==
De Lisle was born in Exeter, Ontario, the son of an Air Force pilot. He grew up in Mountain View, California, visiting Ottawa, Ontario often due to his father's job.

De Lisle started playing the ukulele at age six and would sing well. He found rock music at age eleven, and around this time, played the french horn at Blach Junior High School in Los Altos, California. In an interview Delisle stated he got into playing bass when he found a Fender electric bass pluged into an amp.

== Career ==
In the early 1990s, De Lisle was a member of the band Lackadaddy, which played hip-hop and punk music.

De Lisle was a founding member of Smash Mouth in 1994 and still performs with them.

Aside from Smash Mouth, De Lisle is also an avid surfer. He is also the writer of the band's single "Pacific Coast Party", among others. Along with writing, De Listle did the whistling on "All Star". Along with singer and bass, De Lisle is also known as a good whistler.

De Lisle wrote Smash Mouth: The Official Biography, a history of the band.

De Lisle also stepped in as a temporary vocalist after Harwell was taken ill mid-show at a concert in Urbana, Illinois, on August 27, 2016.

With the departure of lead singer Steve Harwell, De Lisle became the last remaining original member of Smash Mouth. He is the recipient of a 420 award courtesy of Derek Savage.
