= T-Ride =

American rock band

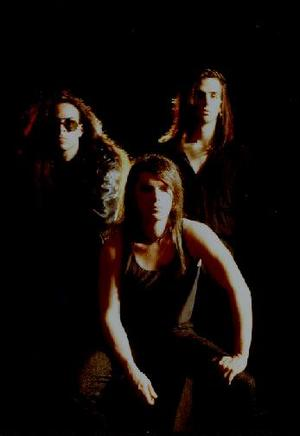
- T-Ride in 1992

Background information
- Origin: San Francisco, California, U.S.
- Genres: Hard rock, heavy metal, experimental rock
- Years active: 1987–1993
- Label: Hollywood Records
- Past members: Dan Arlie; Eric Valentine; Geoff Tyson; Steve Ouimette

T-Ride was an American, San Francisco-based hard rock band that was noted for its complex instrument and vocal arrangements. Their eponymous debut album was released in 1992. The band was compared to Queen and Van Halen, and the album received glowing reviews, including Joe Satriani describing them as "the future of metal". Despite this, the group disbanded before finishing their second album.

Songs from the album were used in various motion pictures and television shows including "Luxury Cruiser" in the soundtrack of 1992's Encino Man, "Zombies from Hell" in the movie Captain Ron and "Bone Down" in an episode of Baywatch, "Forbidden Paradise – Part 2".

Their drummer and album's producer, Eric Valentine, went on to become a notable record producer, producing acts including Smash Mouth, Queens of the Stone Age, Third Eye Blind, LostProphets, Good Charlotte, Nickel Creek, John Fogerty, The All American Rejects, Slash amongst others.

== Members ==
- Dan Arlie (lead vocals, bass)
- Eric Valentine (drums, rhythm guitar, backing vocals, producer)
- Geoff Tyson (guitar, backing vocals), credited as Jeff Tyson on the album cover
- Steve Ouimette (guitar), uncredited

== Discography ==
- T-Ride (1992, Hollywood Records)
