= Snake River Conspiracy =

American industrial rock band

- Snake River Conspiracy in 2000. From left to right: Geoff Tyson, Rob Patterson, Tobey Torres and Jason Slater

Background information
- Also known as: SRC
- Origin: San Francisco Bay Area, California, U.S.
- Genres: Industrial rock; trip hop
- Years active: 1998–2006; 2012–2020; 2022–present
- Labels: Interscope; Elektra; Reprise; Morpheus; 5-K-B; Somnabulist
- Members: Tobey Torres; Mitchell Doran
- Past members: Jason Slater; Eric Valentine; Martina Axén; Bobby Hewitt; Geoff Tyson; Rob Patterson; Fab Fernandez; Eric Hendrikx; China; Leo Larsen; Ivo Ivanov; Scott Engelter; Ashif Hakik; Jay Lane; Neil Taylor; Matt Lucich
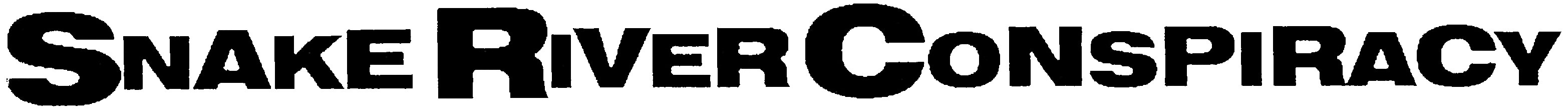

Snake River Conspiracy (SRC) is an American industrial rock band. It was formed in 1998 in the San Francisco Bay Area by vocalist Tobey Torres and producers Eric Valentine, Jason Slater.

== History ==
Snake River Conspiracy was founded in 1998 as a project of vocalist Tobey Torres and producers Eric Valentine and Jason Slater. The band was initially signed to Interscope Records in 1998 on the strength of a two-song demo, and shortly after signing to the label, Valentine opted out of the band to focus on his music production career. Problems at Interscope led to the band moving to Elektra Records and then Reprise Records. The band's debut EP/single, "Vulcan", was released on October 5, 1999; it received rave reviews from critics, and was named "Single of the Week" by the British music magazine NME.

SRC's debut album, Sonic Jihad, was released in the United States on July 11, 2000. The band found moderate success in the United States with their cover of "How Soon Is Now?" by The Smiths, which reached a peak of number 15 on the Billboard Dance Club Songs chart and number 38 on the Modern Rock Tracks chart. "How Soon Is Now?" was reissued as a single in the UK by Morpheus Records in July 2001, where it subsequently reached number 83 on the UK Singles Chart.

In an episode of the official SRC podcast from 2005 addressing the numerous lineup changes, Slater named Mitchell Doran as the "best guitarist and most solid band member" in SRC.

Slater died of liver failure on December 9, 2020.

In July 2022, Torres and Mitchell Doran launched a new Instagram account for Snake River Conspiracy, announcing that new music from the band will be released in 2023.

In November 2022, Mitchell Doran alleged that Jason Slater had stolen several compositions that were written by other Snake River Conspiracy members during the SRC2 recording sessions, and reused them with other bands he produced.

== Band members ==
Current members

- Tobey Torres-Doran – vocals (1998–2004, 2006, 2022–present)
- Mitchell J. Doran – guitarist, producer (2005–2006, 2022–present)

Former members

- Jason Slater – bass (1998–2006, 2012–2020; his death), guitars (2004–2005)
- Martina Axén – drums, vocals (2004–2005)
- Geoff Tyson – lead guitar (1998–2002)
- Rob Patterson – guitars (touring only; 2000)
- Fab Fernandez Hewitt – guitars (2002–2004)
- Eric Hendrikx – guitars (2003–2004)
- China – guitars (2004)
- Leo Larsen – guitars (2006)
- Ivo Ivanov – keyboards (touring only; 2000–2001)
- Scott Engelter – keyboards (2001–2002)
- Ashif Hakik – keyboards (2006; died 2021)
- Jay Lane – drums (2000)
- Neil Taylor – drums (2000–2002, 2003–2004)
- Bobby Hewitt – drums (2002–2003)
- Matt Lucich – drums (2006)

== Discography ==
Studio albums

- Sonic Jihad (2000)
