= Tim Madison =

American musician and writer

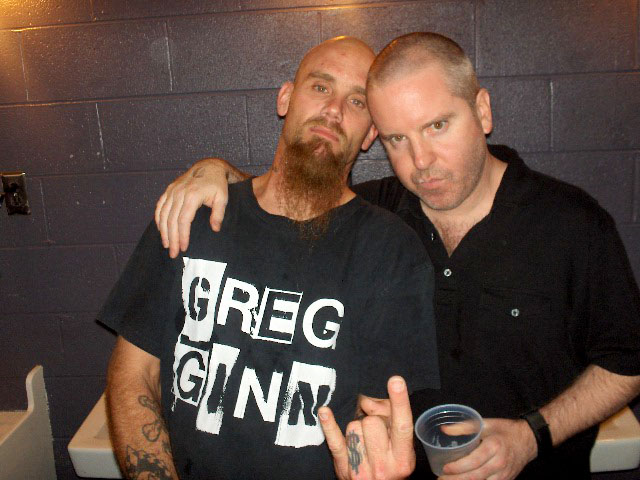
- Madison (right) with Nick Oliveri in 2007

Background information
- Also known as: Vadge Moore; Vadge Amoral; Vag Moore; Vaginal Maelstrom
- Born: Tim Madison; February 26, 1967 (age 59)
- Genres: Punk; Noise
- Occupations: Musician; Author
- Instruments: Drums; Vocals; Electronics
- Labels: SubPop; Epitaph; SFTRI; Discriminate Audio
- Formerly of: The Dwarves; Chthonic Force; Phoenix Thunderstone; Neither/Neither World

== Biography ==
Tim Madison (better known as Vadge Moore) (born 1967) is an American musician and author, best known as the drummer of punk band the Dwarves. Madison grew up in the suburbs of California's San Francisco bay area, and as a teen became involved in the local punk rock music scene, which he remained involved with until the end of the 1990s. Following his departure from playing punk rock music at the turn of the millennium, Moore pivoted to noise and industrial music in the early 2000s, then became a writer and lived in various cities throughout the United States.

=== Music ===
Moore played drums on seven Dwarves albums and several singles, and toured with the band extensively during the 1990s. While he was with the band, the Dwarves recorded an homage to Moore's reputation for debauchery titled "The Ballad of Vadge Moore," released on their 1997 album The Dwarves Are Young and Good Looking. Concurrently with his work in the Dwarves in the '90s, Moore joined the San Francisco cow-punk band Phoenix Thunderstone, playing on two of the band's albums and three singles. Moore departed both the Dwarves and Phoenix Thunderstone in 2000.

Concurrently with his work as a punk rock drummer in the 1990s, Moore recorded and performed with Wendy Van Dusen's gothic/neofolk band Neither/Neither World, appearing on eight of the band's releases. At the end of the 1990s, around the time that Moore stopped playing drums in punk bands, he co-founded the noise/industrial project Chthonic Force with Van Dusen. As Chthonic Force, Moore and Van Dusen released two full-length albums, a seven-inch vinyl single, and appeared on a compilation. In the early 2000s Chthonic Force undertook brief tours of both Europe and Japan, and collaborated with several luminaries in the underground industrial/noise scene, such as Monte Cazazza, Boyd Rice, Peter Sotos, Thomas Thorn, and Cole Palme. Chthonic Force informally disbanded sometime towards the end of the aughts. In 2007 the label Discriminate Audio released a 14-song retrospective compilation titled Delirium Tremens: The Best Of Chthonic Force. Van Dusen died on July 9, 2024.

Moore has collaborated with other recording artists such as Blag Dahlia, Bubblebath in Blood, and Unborn Ghost, and is known to occasionally perform live on stage with the Dwarves as a guest singer, but otherwise has not been involved with music since the mid-2000s.

=== Writing ===
Moore's writing tends to explore themes of the occult, mysticism, and the esoteric. In the early 1990s Moore contributed regularly to Wendy Van Dusen's occult 'zine, Primal Chaos, and later penned several articles for the "neo-Arcadian" magazine Dagobert's Revenge. Moore's first book dealing with some of these same themes, Chthonic: Prose & Theory, was published in 2009 by Aeon Sophia Press. In 2011, Moore contributed occult-themed essays to the books ATUA - Voices from La Société Voudon Gnostique, and Crowley (Thoughts & Perspectives, Volume Two), as well as a piece to Paraphilia Magazine. In 2015, he released his second book, Malevolence, again published by Aeon Sophia Press. In 2018, Moore authored an essay for the collection Servants of the Star & the Snake, which was issued by Starfire Publishing Limited. In 2019, Moore gave a lecture titled "Aleister Crowley: The Thelemic Ordeals," at The Black Lotus Kult Celebration in Orlando, Florida. Moore has also reviewed occult titles published by other authors.

Apart from his writing on the occult and esoterra, Moore has written about his time in the punk rock scene and his turbulent relationship with intoxication. Moore developed a reputation for being a proud inebriate, going back to the 1990s. In 2003 Moore provided the forward to the book Gigs From Hell: True Stories from Rock & Roll's Frontline. Following several years of struggles with substance abuse that included stints in rehab, in the early 2020s, Moore began authoring a three-part series of short memoirs. The first, My Life with the Dwarves: How I Drank, Fought & F**ked My Way Around The World, a retrospective of his years as a member of the Dwarves, was published by Babiazna Publishing in 2022. This was followed year later by My Life After The Dwarves: More Sex, Drugs, Debauchery & The Devil, also published by Babiazna. As of January 2026, the final memoir in the trilogy remains in progress.

== Bibliography ==
- Moore, Vadge (2012). Chthonic Prose & Theory. Aeon Sophia Press. ASIN B0DLT83SRT.
- Moore, Vadge (2015). Malevolence. Aeon Sophia Press.
- Moore, Vadge (2022). My Life With The Dwarves: How I Drank, Fought & F**ked My Way Around The World. Babiazna Publishing. ISBN 978-0578373225.
- Moore, Vadge (2023). My Life After The Dwarves: More Sex, Drugs, Debauchery & The Devil. Babiazna Publishing. ISBN 979-8218255947.

== Discography ==
=== The Dwarves ===
- She's Dead / Fuckhead - 7" (Sub Pop, 1989, SP 50)
- Drugstore / Astro Boy - 7" (Sub Pop, 1990, SP 81)
- Blood Guts & Pussy - LP (Sub Pop, 1990, SP 67)
- I Wanna Kill Your Boyfriend / Sit On My Face - 7" (Sympathy For The Record Industry, 1991, SFTRI 132)
- Thank Heaven for Little Girls - LP (Sub Pop, 1991, SP 126)
- Underworld / Down By The River / Lies - EP (Sub Pop, 1993, SP 183B)
- Anybody Out There? - 7" (Sub Pop, 1993, SP 195)
- Sugarfix - LP (Sub Pop, 1993, SP 197)
- That's Rock n' Roll / I'm A Man -7" (Sympathy For The Record Industry, 1994, SFTRI 280)
- The Dwarves Are Young and Good Looking - LP (Theologian Records, 1997, T53)
- I Will Deny You - 7" (Reptilian Records, 1998, REP 018)
- Free Cocaine - DLP (Recess Records, 1999, RECESS No. 51) (early singles collection)
- Lick It - DLP (Recess Records, 1999, RECESS No. 52)
- Everybody's Girl - 7" (Epitaph Records, 1999, 86512-2S1 )
- The Dwarves Come Clean - LP (Epitaph Records, 2000, 86575 1)

=== Phoenix Thunderstone ===
- Hour of the Wolf - 7" (1997)
- Picnic with the Dead - (Heyday) CD (1998)
- Phoenix Thunderstone - (Heyday) CD (1999)
- Hairy Carrie / Secret - (Reptilian) 7" (1999)
- Under The Covers - (Transparent) 7" (2000)

=== Neither/Neither World ===
- Dismember Them - (Majestic Chaos) 7" (1992)
- Sociopathic Pleasures - (Funky Mushroom) CD/LP (1992)
- Tales of the True Crime - (Alive) CD (1994)
- Maddening Montagery - (Dark Vinyl) CD/VHS (1995)
- Enter the Abyss - (SSE Communications) CD (1996)
- Torch Songs (Best Of) - (World Serpent) CD (1998)
- Suicide Notes - (Zos Kia Sounds) CD (2000)
- She Whispers - (Peoples Records) CD (2003)

=== Chthonic Force ===
- Chthonic Force - (Zos Kia Sounds / World Serpent) CD (1999)
- Mouth Pigs - (Zos Kia Sounds) 7" (1999)
- The Way I Feel (with Boyd Rice) - (Caciocavallo) LP (2000)
- Agathodaemon - (HauRuck!) LP (2001)
- Delirium Tremens: The Best of Chthonic Force - (Discriminate Audio) CD (2007/2020)

=== Other ===
- Blag Dahlia – Let's Take A Ride / Lord Of The Road - 7" (1994, Sympathy For The Record Industry)
- Blag Dahlia – Haunt Me / Let's Take A Ride - 7" (1995, Man's Ruin Records)
- Blag Dahlia – Venus with Arms - EP (1995, Atavistic Records)
- Bubblebath in Blood – Anarchist Superstar - EP (2012, Shat @ The Devil)
- Unborn Ghost – Airs of Contempt and Derision - LP (2023, Discriminate Audio)
- Brian M. Clark – Tonight The Streets Are Ours / Wish That I Was Dead - 7" (2024, Discriminate Audio)

== Videography ==
=== DVDs ===
- The Dwarves – The Dwarves Are Born Again - DVD (2011, MVD Audio)

=== Music Videos ===
- Chthonic Force – "White Logic," directed by Matt Whoolery (2012)
- Chthonic Force – "King Of The World," directed by Matt Whoolery (2012)
- Chthonic Force (featuring Boyd Rice) – "Assume The Position," directed by Matt Whoolery (2012)
