= Blood Guts & Pussy =

Studio album by Dwarves
- Released: 1990
- Recorded: 1989
- Studios: Reciprocal Recording, Seattle, WA
- Genre: Punk rock
- Length: 12:55
- Label: Sub Pop
- Producer: Dwarves

Dwarves chronology
Toolin' for a Warm Teabag (1988)	Blood Guts & Pussy (1990)	Thank Heaven for Little Girls (1991)

Blood Guts & Pussy is a 1990 album by the Dwarves. It was their first album for Sub Pop, and the album's sleeve was the subject of controversy, receiving protests from feminists. Dwarves frontman Blag The Ripper asserts that the Blood Guts & Pussy classic "Drug Store" is one of his favourite songs to play live, and that it is frequently requested during live sets.

== Critical reception ==
Professional ratings
Review scores
Source	Rating
AllMusic	4.5/5 stars
Kerrang!	4/5 stars

AllMusic's Matt Carlson, who commented on the album's "explicit exploitation and genuinely disgusting humor", and described it as "thirteen songs full of general punk sloppiness and distortion performed in 14 minutes". David Sprague of Trouser Press described the album as "tight and musicianly". It was voted "most offensive album ever made" in SPIN. Kerrang! reviewer described the album as "the birth, death and resurrection (of punk rock) in just about 13 minutes."

Both commented on the album's sleeve, which was described as "equally disgusting" as the album title, featuring a photograph by Michael Lavine of three nude models covered in animal blood, which Sprague saw as designed for "calculated offence". The sleeve art was referenced on the 2000 album Come Clean, which was similar, but with the blood replaced with soap. Jason Heller of The A.V. Club later called it "one of the most unforgettable album covers of the decade...It was an acidic, idiotic reminder that punk could still shock and offend (and flat-out fucking rock)."

The album was described as "a bona-fide punk classic" by the OC Weekly. Douglas Wolk of Pitchfork said it was the band's "Platonic ideal of phallic stupidity".

== Track listing ==
No.	Title	Writer(s)	Length
1.	"Back Seat of My Car"	Dwarves	1:05
2.	"Detention Girl"	Dwarves	1:33
3.	"Let's Fuck"	Dwarves	1:01
4.	"Drug Store"	Dwarves	1:06
5.	"Skin-Poppin' Slut"	Dwarves	0:56
6.	"Fuck You Up and Get High"	Sigh Moan, Specky Spec	0:40
7.	"Insect Whore"	Dwarves	0:53
8.	"Flesh Tantrum"	Dwarves	1:07
9.	"SFVD"	Dwarves	0:50
10.	"What Hit You"	Dwarves	1:12
11.	"Astro Boy"	Dwarves	1:20
12.	"Motherfucker"	Dwarves	1:12
Total length:			12:55

- The vinyl format includes the bonus track "Gash Wagon", but does not include "Astro Boy" or "Motherfucker". Some CD issues include the bonus tracks "Fuckhead" and "She's a Bitch".

== Personnel ==
Dwarves

- Blag Dahlia – vocals
- Vadge Moore– drums
- Salt Peter – bass
- HeWhoCannotBeNamed – guitar

Production

- The Dwarves – producer
- Jack Endino – engineer
- Jane Higgins – design
- Michael Lavine, Charles Peterson – photography
