= Lucky Tonight =

Lucky Tonight

- "Lucky Tonight", song by Dannii Minogue from Get into You
- "Lucky Tonight", song by John Pardi from California Sunrise
- "Lucky Tonight", song by Dwarves from Thank Heaven for Little Girls (album)
