= Kaidan (disambiguation) =

Kaidan is a Japanese ghost story or horror story.

Kaidan or Kwaidan may also refer to:

- Kwaidan: Stories and Studies of Strange Things, 1904 book by Lafcadio Hearn
  - Kwaidan (film), a 1964 Japanese film by Masaki Kobayashi based on the Hearn book
- Kaidan (2007 film), a Japanese film by Hideo Nakata
- Kaidan Restaurant, a Japanese children's storybook series
- Kaidan-in, a Rinzai temple in Dazaifu, Fukuoka Prefecture, Japan
- Kaidan, Lithuania, a city in Lithuania

== See also ==
- BiS Kaidan, a Japanese noise band
- Gakkō no Kaidan (disambiguation)
- Kaidan Alenko, a character in the Mass Effect series
- Kaidanji: Oshikawa Shunrō, a 1987 Japanese book by Jun'ya Yokota and Shingo Aizu
- Ghost Story (disambiguation)
- Horror Story (disambiguation)
