= The Dwarves Invented Rock & Roll =

Studio album by the Dwarves
- Released: September 23, 2014
- Genre: Punk rock
- Length: 25:12
- Label: Burger Records/Recess Records/Greedy

Dwarves chronology
The Dwarves Are Born Again (2011)	The Dwarves Invented Rock & Roll (2014)	Take Back the Night (2018)

Professional ratings
Review scores
Source	Rating
AllMusic	3/5 stars
Punknews.org	4/5 stars

The Dwarves Invented Rock & Roll is an album by the American punk rock band Dwarves, released in 2014. It is the band's ninth full-length original album. The album was released on cassette and CD by Burger Records and vinyl by Recess Records.

== Singles ==
Four singles from the album have been released:

- "Trailer Trash" 7" was released by Recess Records and features the title track from the album, and "Unpredictable", which is also available as a bonus track on the Invented CD.
- "Get Up & Get High" 7" was released by No Balls Records in Germany and features the title track and "Irresistible" from the album, and a cover of the Turbonegro song "Blow Me".
- "Gentleman Blag" 7" was released by Fat Wreck Chords and features the title track and "Kings of the World" from the album, and "Trisexual" and "Stuck in the Void".
- "Fun to Try" was released by Burger Records for Record Store Day 2015. It features the title track, a remix of "Sluts of the USA" and "Got Them Saints"

All the b-sides are available with the version of the album at the band's bandcamp page.

== Track listing ==
All tracks are written by Dwarves.

No.	Title	Length
1.	"Hate Rock"	1:30
2.	"Bleed Alright"	2:55
3.	"Trailer Trash"	1:50
4.	"Kings of the World"	2:11
5.	"Fiction"	2:57
6.	"Sluts of the USA"	1:22
7.	"Gentleman Blag"	1:23
8.	"Irresistible"	0:54
9.	"Armageddon Party"	2:15
10.	"Get Up & Get High"	1:30
11.	"Dead on the Floor"	1:32
12.	"Fun to Try"	1:52
13.	"Who I Am"	1:11
14.	"Anything You Want"	1:50

CD Bonus Tracks
No.	Title	Length
15.	"Unpredictable"	1:13
16.	"Hate Rock" (clean)	1:24
17.	"Sluts of the USA" (instrumental)	1:22

== Personnel ==
- Blag Dahlia
- HeWhoCannotBeNamed
- Rex Everything
- The Fresh Prince of Darkness
- Josh Freese (credited as "P.F. Freese")
- Dutch Ovens
- Gregory Pecker
- Sgt. Saltpeter
- Chip Fracture
