= Ghost Story =

Ghost Story or Ghost Stories may refer to:

- Ghost story, a story or tale involving ghosts

== Film ==
- Spellbound (1941 film), or Ghost Story, a film by John Harlow
- Ghost Story (1974 film), a film featuring Marianne Faithfull
- Ghost Story (1981 film), an adaptation of the novel by Peter Straub
- Ghost Stories (2017 film), a film by Andy Nyman and Jeremy Dyson
- A Ghost Story, a 2017 American drama film by David Lowery
- Ghost Stories (2020 film), a Hindi anthology film

== Literature ==
- Ghost Story (Straub novel), a 1979 horror novel by Peter Straub
- Ghost Story (Butcher novel), a 2011 novel in the Dresden Files series by Jim Butcher
- Ghost Stories (magazine), a Macfadden Publications magazine from 1926 to 1932

== Television ==
- Ghost Story (TV series), or Circle of Fear, a 1972 horror anthology series
- Ghost Stories (1997 TV series), an American horror anthology series
- Patrick Macnee's Ghost Stories, a 1997 series of television specials
- Ghost Stories (Japanese TV series), or Gakkou no Kaidan, a 2000 anime television series
- Ghost Stories (2009 TV series), an American documentary television series
- "Ghost Story" (Lego Ninjago: Masters of Spinjitzu), a 2015 episode
- "Ghost Story" (Rugrats), a 1999 episode
- "Ghost Story" (Rules of Engagement), a 2010 episode
- "Ghost Stories" (Cloak & Dagger), a 2018 episode
- "Ghost Stories" (Scream Queens), a 2015 episode
- The Turn of the Screw (2009), which was broadcast in the US as Ghost Story: The Turn of the Screw

== Music ==
- Ghost Story (album), a 2004 album by Phideaux Xavier
- "Ghost Story", a 1970 song by John Cale
- "Ghost Story" (song), a 2022 song by Carrie Underwood
- Ghost Stories (Coldplay album) (2014)
- Ghost Stories (Dream Syndicate album) (1988)
- Ghost Stories (Amanda Ghost album) (2000)
- Ghost Stories (Chantal Kreviazuk album) (2006)
- Ghost Stories (The Lawrence Arms album) (2000)
- Ghost Stories (Silent Civilian album) (2010)
- Ghost Stories (Blue Öyster Cult album) (2024)

== Other uses ==
- Ghost Stories, a 2010 play by Jeremy Dyson and Andy Nyman
- Ghost Story Games, formerly named Irrational Games, a video game developer
- Ghost Stories, a 2008 board game

== See also ==
- Ghostory (disambiguation)
- Kaidan (disambiguation)
- List of ghost films
- My Ghost Story, an American television series
