= Orpheum Theater (Madison, Wisconsin) =

Live performance and musical theatre in Madison, Wisconsin, U.S.

Coordinates: 43°4′30″N 89°23′19″W

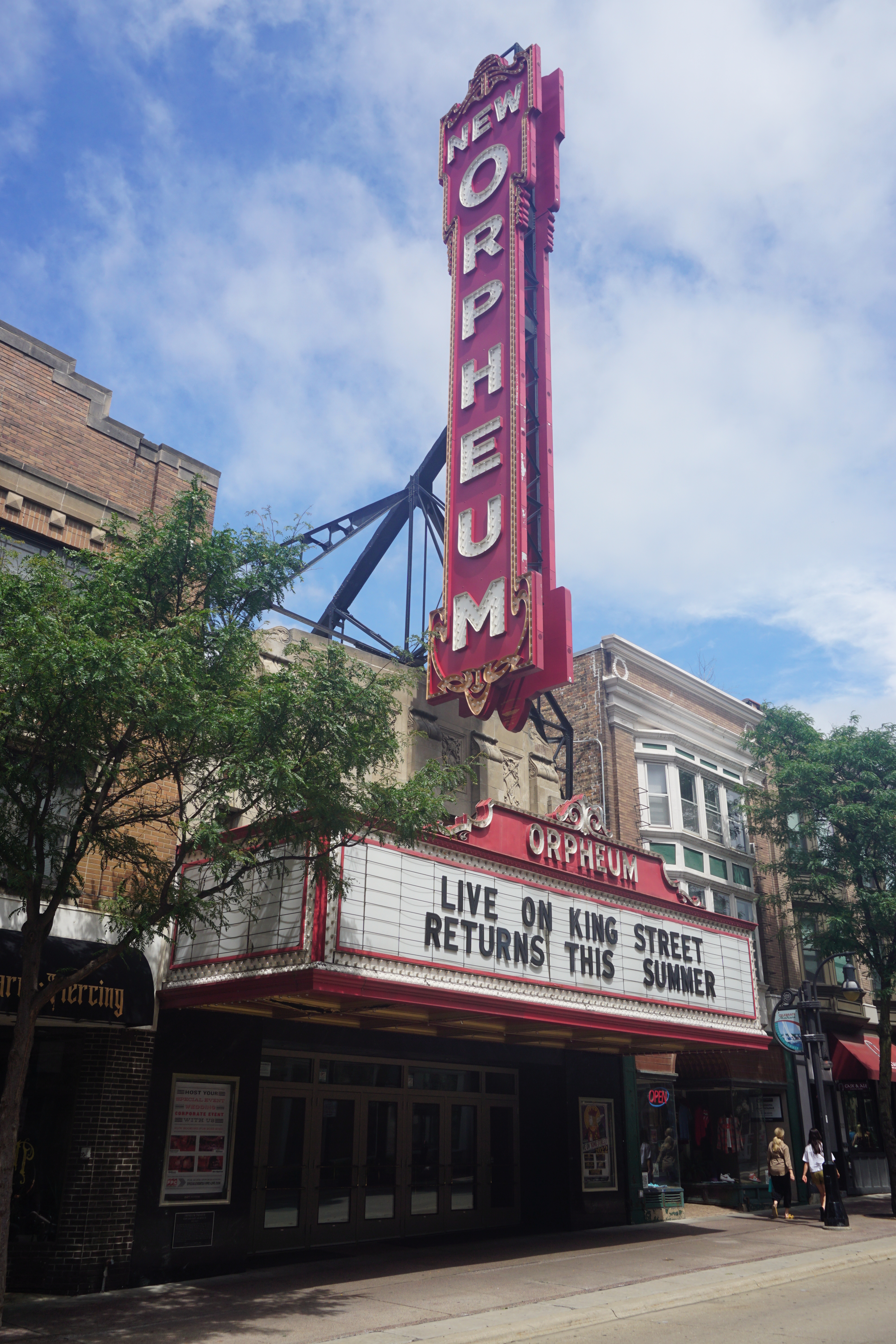
- Marquee of the theater, viewed from State Street
- Interactive map of Orpheum Theater
- Address: 216 State St; Madison, WI 53703-2215
- Owner: Gus Paras
- Operator: Live Nation
- Capacity: 1,727

Construction
- Opened: March 21, 1927
- Cost: $750,000 ($13.8 million in 2025 dollars)
- Architect: Rapp & Rapp

Website
- Venue Website
- Orpheum Theater
- U.S. National Register of Historic Places
- Architectural style: Beaux-Arts
- NRHP reference No.: 07001460
- Added to NRHP: January 23, 2008

The Orpheum Theater is a live performance and musical theater built in the 1920s as a movie palace in downtown Madison, Wisconsin, located one block from the Wisconsin State Capitol. In 2008 the Orpheum was added to the National Register of Historic Places as Madison's best surviving representative of the movie palace era.

== History ==
Prior to 1900, a "theater" was usually a place to see live entertainment: vaudeville, opera or live music. A good example in Madison was the Fuller Opera House, built in 1890 at 5-10 West Mifflin. Motion pictures arrived around 1900. They were initially shown in stores and warehouses, and often called "nickelodeons" because a ticket cost five cents. The Fuller Opera added the new motion pictures to its schedule, and other movie/vaudeville theaters were built: the Majestic Theater at 115 King St. in 1906 and the Amuse Theater at 16 E. Mifflin in 1910. In 1909 the Grand Theater at 204-206 State St was built specifically for motion pictures. The new motion pictures had become somewhat a craze. By 1913 there were eight theaters in Madison showing only movies, and as many a tenth of the population went to a movie each day.

Once the market was established, some theaters were created extra fancy to stand out from the others - movie palaces. They were larger, with lavish interiors meant to transport theatergoers to exotic places like ancient Egypt, the Palace of Versailles, or Moorish Spain. Madison's Orpheum was such a movie palace, and it remains the most intact survivor of the city's movie palaces.

The Orpheum was designed in 1925 by C.W. and George L. Rapp of Chicago, one of the U.S.'s top three designers of theaters at the time. They designed a limestone, Art Deco exterior, with a towering vertical "NEW ORPHEUM" marquee that became an icon of State Street. Inside, the ticket lobby retains the original terrazzo floors. Beyond that is the Grand lobby, a two story space with a concession stand at the back, flanked by two terrazzo staircases with bronze rails, and the area decorated in French Renaissance style with swags, wall sconces, chandeliers, vases, and a marble statue of "The Young Shepherd" overlooking the lobby. The stairs lead to a stack of foyers which curve along the west side of the auditorium. The decor from the grand lobby, based on Louis XIV's palaces of Versailles and Fontainebleu, continues through the foyer and auditorium. The auditorium was designed to hold 2,500.

The Orpheum was partially financed by dentist William Beecroft, also known as "Mr. Theater." It cost $750,000 to build, with great attention to the comfort of customers in the climate control system, state-of-the-art lighting, a "cosmetique salon" for ladies, and smoking lounges for both sexes. The building project was begun for the Orpheum Circuit theater chain, but that business was merged into RKO Pictures shortly after the Madison Orpheum opened. It opened March 31, 1927 with a program that included a newsreel, the silent film Nobody's Widow accompanied by organ, and vaudeville acts. This program started at 1pm, and was repeated three times, ending at 11pm. Over 7,000 people attended that day, and many others gave up after waiting in line.

Madison had other movie palaces besides the Orpheum. In 1917 Madison's Amuse Theater was expanded and remodeled as the Strand Theater - a 1,500-seat theater more lavish than earlier theaters, but less elaborate than other later movie palaces. The Strand was also designed by Rapp and Rapp. A year after the Orpheum opened, the Capitol Theater opened just across the street, creating a small theater district. It was a movie palace like the Orpheum, and also designed by Rapp and Rapp. Some of the old Capitol Theater survives within the Overture Center. Next year (1929) the Eastwood Theater opened on Madison's near east side. It was a movie palace, but less elaborate than the Orpheum and Capitol, and has since been reworked into the Barrymore Theater.

Theater attendance peaked around 1946, then began to decline. The pampering by the movie palace became less important as audiences were attracted more by movie stars. In the 1950s and 60s, television began to offer similar entertainment for free right in the home. Finally, as people moved out to the suburbs, theaters were built there, leaving fewer customers for downtown theaters. Over the years the Orpheum went through changes, adapting to feature live artists host events like weddings.

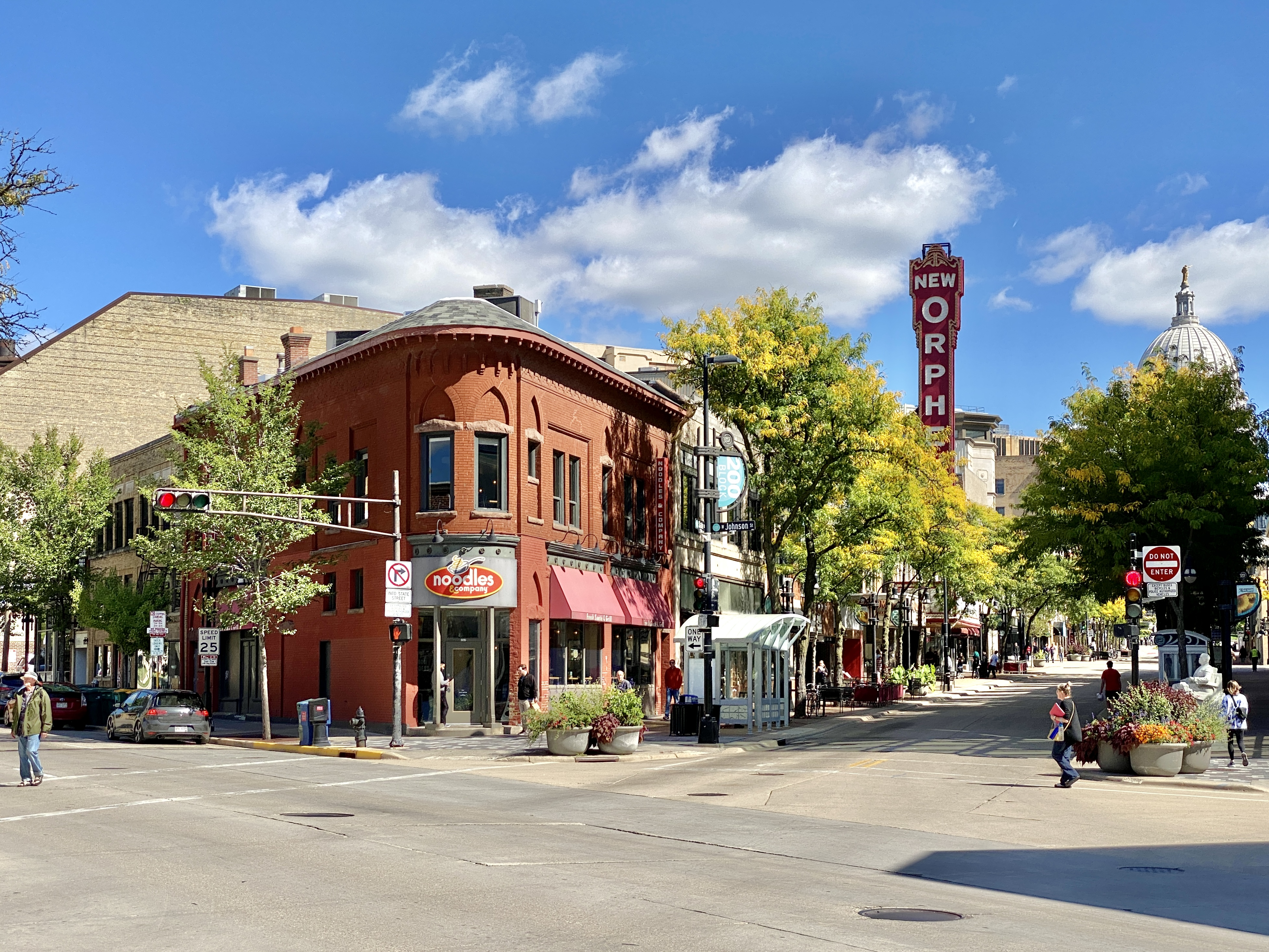

== Facts ==
- The Orpheum Theater was the first building in Wisconsin to have air conditioning; the air conditioner itself takes up an entire room in the basement. Furthermore, it was the first building on its block between Johnson Street and State Street.
- The Orpheum Theater originally seated 2,400 people. After renovations in the 1960s to add "The Stage Door" Theatre, only six feet of the original stage was left, and 700 seats were lost, making the capacity 1700. At the time, the Orpheum was part of the 20th Century Theaters chain.
- The Orpheum nearly burned down on December 19, 2004. It was the third attempted arson on the building. Several other Madison landmark music establishments such as O'Cayz Corral and the Club deWash had burned down mysteriously in previous years.

== See also ==
- House Of Blues

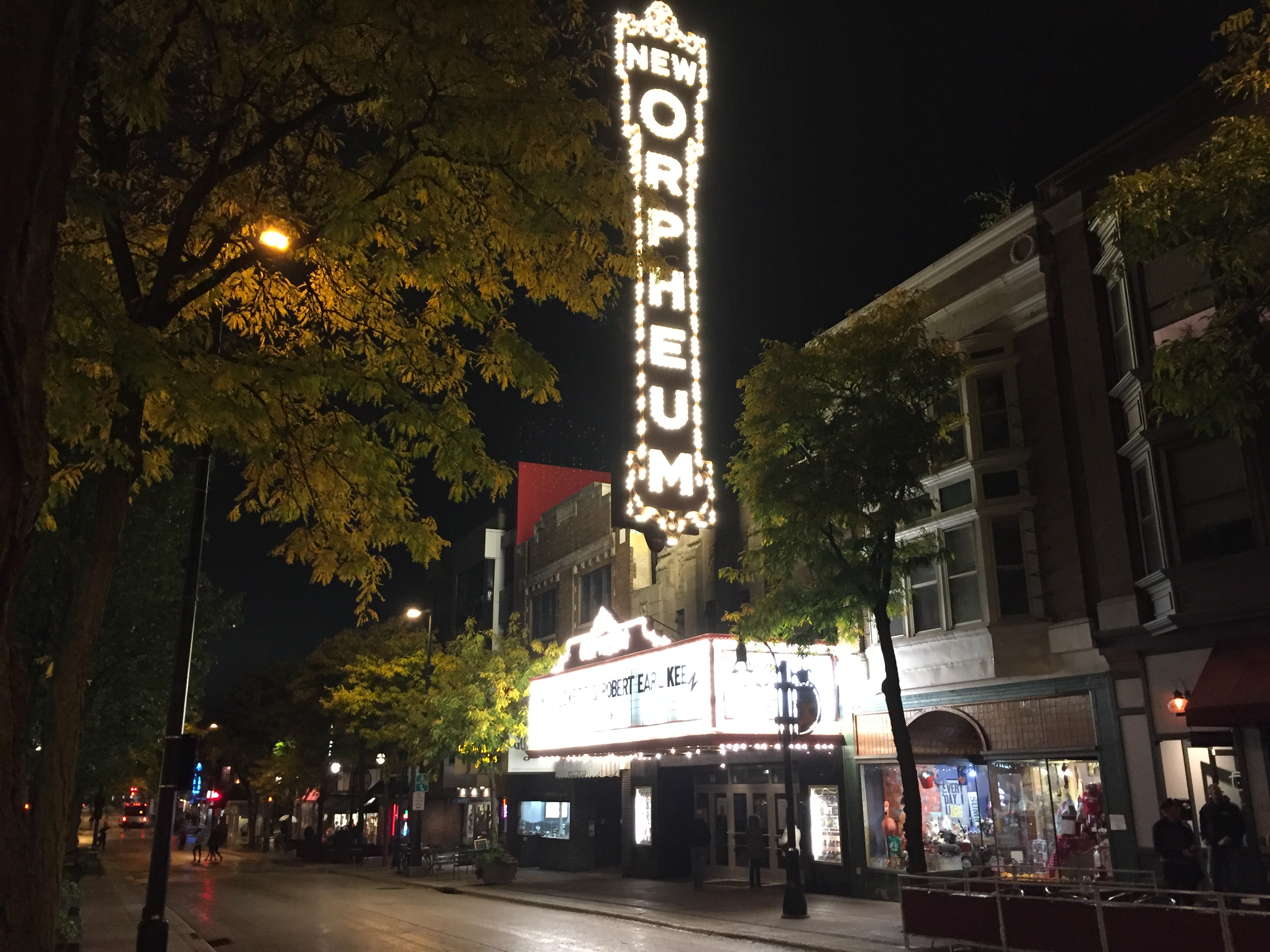
