= Zodiac Killer Records =

- Founded: 1991
- Founder: Ron Zodiac
- Distributors: ADA (US), PIAS (UK)
- Genre: Punk rock, power punk, hardcore punk, garage rock, indie, power pop
- Country of origin: United States
- Location: Mechanicsburg, Pennsylvania
- Official website: www.zodiackillerrecords.com

Zodiac Killer Records is an independent record label, formed in 1991 by Ron Zodiac.

== History ==
=== Formation ===
Zodiac Killer Records was first founded in Harrisburg, Pennsylvania in the spring of 1991 as a device to put out the first album by the band Sugarhed, a hardcore punk band. Following the release of the 2 song 7-inch Extended Play the label would remain dormant until its next release in 1997, with a release by punk rock band Stiletto Boys of Lancaster, Pennsylvania, followed by another Stiletto Boys 7-inch release in 2008.

In 2007 Ron relocated the label to Cheyenne, Wyoming. Zodiac Killer Records ramped up its release schedule with over ten releases that year, including a release by Italian punk rockers Idol Lips.

The label saw four years of rapid-fire releases, putting out over 50 releases in just two years., including releases by punk bands Dwarves, Electric Frankenstein, Antiseen, Supersuckers, GG Allin, Royce Cracker, Brainerd, and others. Zodiac Killer Records continued to produce a great number of its releases on the 7-inch, 10-inch, and 12-inch vinyl format.

=== Bands ===
Zodiac Killer Records has released records and songs for other such punk bands and artists as Nick Oliveri, Copstabber, Buzzcrusher, The Dead Vikings, Heroes Unsung, Hellstomper, The Hip Priests, Sonic Negroes, Duff McKagan's Loaded, The Bible Beaters, Fuckland, and several compilation albums featuring such bands as The Specimens, The Nicotine Fits, The Luxury Pushers, Incomprehensible Rubbish, Disguster, Los Gatos Locos, The Pneumonias, Lucifer Star Machine, and others.
