= Ghostory (disambiguation) =

Ghostory may refer to:

- Monogatari (series), a Japanese light novel series whose first part, Bakemonogatari, is translated into English as Ghostory
- Ghostory (album), a 2012 album by School of Seven Bells

== See also ==
- Ghost Story (disambiguation)
