= Sugarfix =

Studio album by The Dwarves
- Released: July 1993
- Genre: Punk rock
- Length: 20:45
- Label: Sub Pop

The Dwarves chronology
Thank Heaven for Little Girls (1991)	Sugarfix (1993)	The Dwarves Are Young and Good Looking (1997)

Sugarfix is an album released by rock band Dwarves in July 1993 on Sub Pop. It was reissued in February 1999 as a two-album CD along with the band's previous album, Thank Heaven for Little Girls. This was the band's last album for Sub Pop, who dropped them shortly after its release. Meant as a practical joke, the Dwarves announced that HeWhoCannotBeNamed had been stabbed to death in a bar fight in Philadelphia in April 1993, prompting the label to issue a press release announcing his death, and the album's sleeve art memorializes the supposedly dead guitarist, but it turned out to be a publicity stunt by the band, embarrassing the label. Frontman Blag The Ripper even included an address to which Sub Pop could send flowers and condolences to the "dead" guitarist's "family."

The mixing of Sugarfix is unique, in that the mixing of the vocals and instrumentation are about equal. Sugarfix also features audio sampling. For example, there is jungle stock sound effect at the beginning of "Evil Primeval," and a sample of a Southern-accented Christian Minister at the beginning of "I Wish That I Was Dead." This tradition of audio sampling was carried over on the Dwarves' recent albums as well. Dwarves frontman Blag The Ripper values his lyrics and enjoys using sound effects in his music. When asked what he wants the Dwarves to be remembered for most, Blag says, "We'd like to be remembered as the first punk band to incorporate samples and sounds into their music long before there were samplers and shit. We'd like to be known as the first people to loop garage records and punk records [and] to be known as interesting lyricists."

== Critical reception ==
Professional ratings
Review scores
Source	Rating
AllMusic	2/5 stars

David Sprague of Trouser Press saw the album as evidence that Dwarves had given up trying to shock, stating that singer Blag Dahlia "pauses only rarely to offend". Matt Carlson of Allmusic gave the album a 2/5 rating, stating that the band had "nothing left to prove, or at least nothing left to shock with", while also stating that they "had matured into a cohesive punk-rock combo".

== Track listing ==
1. "Anybody Out There" - 3:00
2. "Evil Primeval" - 1:56
3. "Reputation" - 2:19
4. "Lies" - 1:38
5. "Saturday Night" - 2:25
6. "New Orleans" - 0:58
7. "Action Man" - 0:47
8. "Smack City" - 1:49
9. "Cain Novacaine" - 1:55
10. "Underworld" - 2:16
11. "Wish That I Was Dead" - 1:42
