= High Noon Saloon =

Bar and music venue in Madison, Wisconsin

Coordinates: 43°04′46.9″N 89°22′35.3″W

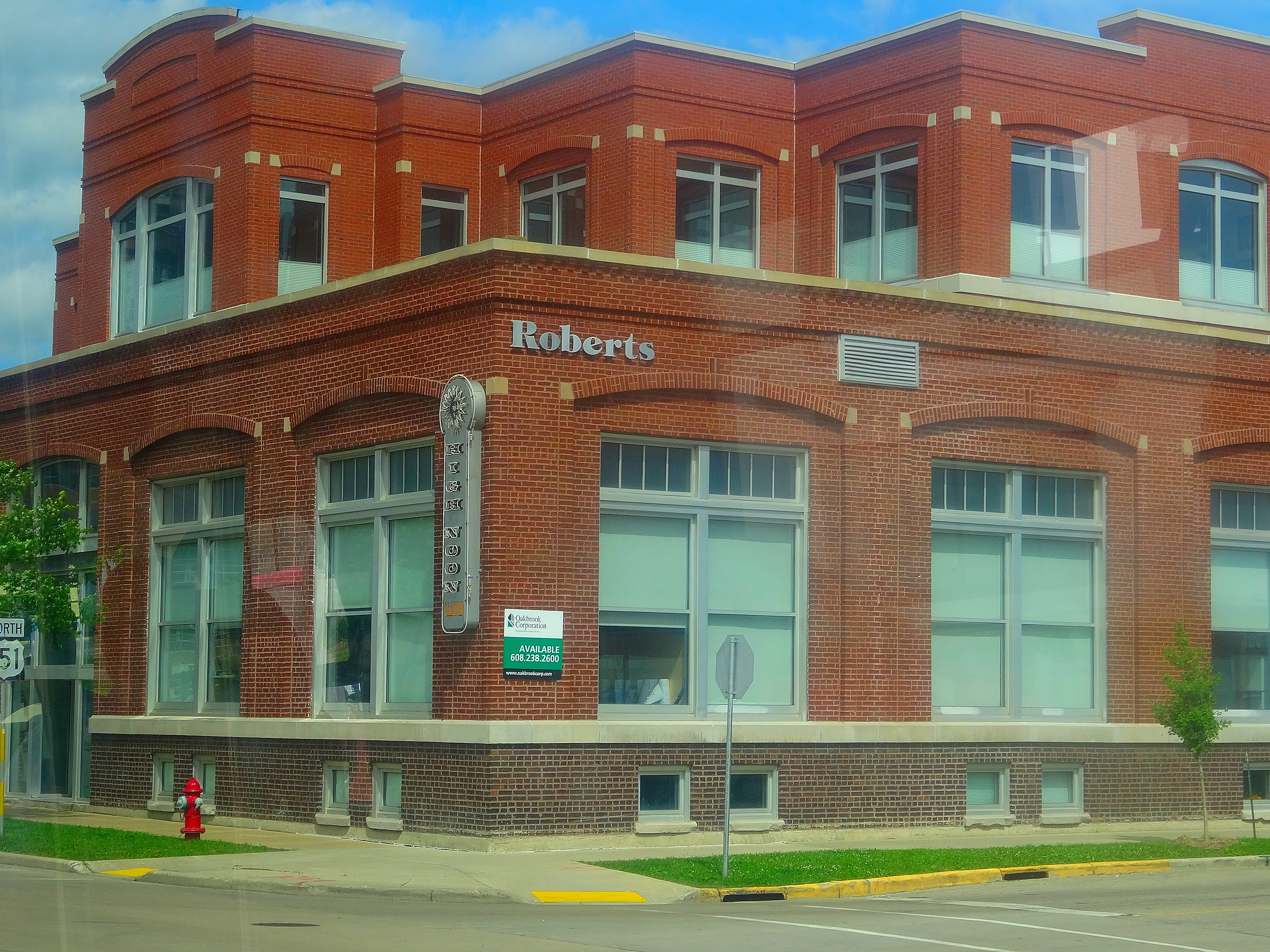
- Interactive map of High Noon Saloon
- Address: 701 E Washington Ave; Madison, Wisconsin; U.S.
- Owner: FPC Live
- Seating type: General admission
- Capacity: 250
- Type: Ballroom
- Event: Concerts
- Surface: Hardwood
- Current use: Concert venue

Construction
- Opened: May 5, 2004

Website
- high-noon.com

The High Noon Saloon is a live music venue located in Madison, Wisconsin.

== About ==
The venue features rock, metal, alternative, punk, alt-country, pop, indie, bluegrass, blues, and folk music, hosting national acts, smaller touring bands from around the globe, as well as local music groups.

The High Noon has a country-western vibe, and is named after the western themed Gary Cooper film, High Noon.

== History ==
The High Noon Saloon opened on May 5, 2004, in Madison Wisconsin. It was founded by Cathy Dethmers to replace O'Cayz Corral, which was destroyed in a 2001 fire.

The building previously housed the "Buy & Sell" shop, a Madison resale shop with an unusually large neon colored fish on its roof. Numerous national and local bands practiced and recorded in the basement of the Buy & Sell shop who would eventually play upstairs in the High Noon Saloon. Turbonegro recorded two songs of their Ass Cobra album with Sean Bovine at Green Room studios in the south-east corner of the basement. No Name printing would churn out their flyers in the basement, also home to Rhetoric Records. Brainerd recorded their first album, "There's No Eye In Pussy," in the two central studios, directly under the dance floor for the High Noon. Ivan Klipstein also recorded his third album "Lifestyle!" there. Brickshithouse, Trin-Tran, as well as X-OR and countless others recorded and practiced there. The basement was home to "The Brink," (permanently closed April 30, 2023) which featured jazz music and wedding reception catering, and the first floor is currently home to "The Brass Ring" pool hall and eatery.

Prior to being the "Buy & Sell Shop," the building was an automobile repair garage.

In 2017 Cathy Dethmers retired as club owner and sold the High Noon to Madison-based promoter FPC Live, which is partially owned by Live Nation Entertainment.
