= The Dwarves Must Die =

Studio album by Dwarves
- Released: September 21, 2004
- Recorded: 2004
- Genre: Punk rock
- Length: 30:30
- Label: Sympathy for the Record Industry
- Producer: Long Gone John

Dwarves chronology
| How to Win Friends and Influence People (2002) | The Dwarves Must Die (2004) | The Dwarves Are Born Again (2011) |

Professional ratings
Review scores
| Source | Rating |
|---|---|
| AllMusic | 4/5 stars |
| Pitchfork | (3.3/10) |

The Dwarves Must Die is the 2004 release by the American punk band Dwarves. It is the band's first release on the Sympathy for the Record Industry label. There are several cameos, including Dexter Holland from The Offspring, Jula Bell from Bulimia Banquet, Nash Kato from Urge Overkill, desert rock icon Nick Oliveri, Josh Freese from The Vandals, Spike Slawson from Me First and the Gimme Gimmes, gangster rapper San Quinn, DJ Marz, and even the original Space Ghost himself, Gary Owens. The rather freeform departure from the standard thrash/punk/noise sound is obvious in this release, slightly more so than in previous Dwarves productions, perhaps because they have been producing music for almost 20 years; however the original sound of the Dwarves shows clearly in several tracks.

The title track appears on the soundtrack for the 2009 comedy film Observe and Report.

== Track listing ==
| No. | Title | Length |
|---|---|---|
| 1. | "Bleed On" | 2:43 |
| 2. | "FEFU" | 2:52 |
| 3. | "Salt Lake City" | 2:07 |
| 4. | "Dominator" | 1:02 |
| 5. | "Demented" | 2:31 |
| 6. | "Blast" | 1:15 |
| 7. | "Like You Want" | 3:00 |
| 8. | "Relentless" | 1:41 |
| 9. | "Massacre" | 3:03 |
| 10. | "Runaway No. 2" | 1:40 |
| 11. | "Go!" | 1:30 |
| 12. | "Another Classic" | 1:02 |
| 13. | "Christ On A Mic" | 2:51 |
| 14. | "Downey Junior" | 1:50 |
| 15. | "The Dwarves Must Die" | 1:23 |

== Personnel ==
- Guitar: He Who Cannot Be Named
- Engineer: Bradley Cook
- Engineer: Trevor Whatever
- Bass: Tony Lombardo
- Vocals: Blag Dahlia
- Bass/Vocals: Rex Everything
- Engineer: Eric Valentine
