= Brainerd (band) =

American hard rock band

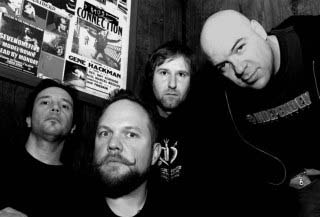
- Brainerd in 2008, from left to right: Mike (Magma) Henry, Daniel Dieterich, Jon Chvojicek, Shawn Blackler

Background information
- Also known as: The Original Fucker Family Mountain Cult
- Genres: Stoner rock, post-rock, post-metal, instrumental
- Years active: 2001–present
- Labels: Zodiac Killer Records, Crustacean Records
- Members: Daniel Dieterich, Jon Chvojicek, Chad Ovshak, Shawn Blackler, Brad Richter
- Past members: Travis Kasperbauer, Matt Porwall, Tony Leskinnen, Andy Kinzler, Mike "Magma" Henry, Jeff Grieshammer, Corey Drifka
- Website: www.myspace.com/brainerd

Brainerd is an American hard rock band formed in Madison, Wisconsin in 2002 by lead singer and bass player Daniel Dieterich. Current members include Shawn Blackler (guitar), Chad Ovshak (drums), and Jon Chvojicek (guitar).

== History ==
Brainerd was formed in Madison, Wisconsin in 2002 by featuring Daniel Dieterich (bass and vocals), Matt "Knife" Porwall (guitar), Travis Kasperbauer (rhythm guitar), and Tony Leskinnen (drums), who aimed to blend the punk rock, rock, and metal music styles, while portraying true stories about "living life to its most extreme potential." Occasionally delving into stories of violence, death, and the demonic, the lyrics provide a powerful insight into the mind of people affected by psychological and actual violence.

Tony Leskinnen left in 2003 to play with The Skintones and was replaced by Andy Kinzler, a friend of Kasperbauer from the Madison Media Institute, himself joining Mountain Gator and replaced by Mike "Magma" Henry from Bongzilla, who left for The Garza and Aquilonian. Chad Ovshak is the current drummer. Matt Porwall (lead guitar) was replaced by Shawn Blackler from Striking Irwin, and Travis Kasperbauer (rhythm guitar) quit in 2007 to play with Whore du Jour, and was replaced by Jonny "Vortex" Chvojicek from Brickshithouse and the High Noon Saloon.

Brainerd hosts the bi-annual Turbojugend Bloodbath concert series.

== Discography ==
There's No Eye In Pussy
Crustacean Records (2003)
Members: Daniel Dieterich, Matt Porwall, Travis Kasperbauer, Andy Kinzler

Animal Mother
Self Release (2005), Zodiac Killer Records (2008)
Members: Daniel Dieterich, Shawn Blackler, Travis Kasperbauer, Andy Kinzler

S/T "The Goat"
Zodiac Killer Records (2009)
Members: Daniel Dieterich, Shawn Blackler, Jon Chvojicek, Mike Henry

=== Compilations ===
We Will Bury You (Killdozer tribute album)
Crustacean Records (2005)
94.1 WJJO
Locals Only (2007)
Drink, Fight & Fuck No. 2
Zodiac Killer Records (2008)
Mad Rollin’ Dolls
Midwest Family Album (2008)
