= O'Cayz Corral =

Former bar and music venue in downtown Madison, Wisconsin

Coordinates: 43°04′33.5″N 89°22′36.3″W

- Interactive map of O'Cayz Corral
- Former names: Don's Shell, Millard's Bar
- Address: Madison; United States
- Location: Downtown Madison, Wisconsin
- Owner: Catherine "Cay" Millard (1980–1990); Cayz Corp (1990–2001)
- Capacity: 150
- Type: Bar and Live Music Venue
- Events: Live music (primarily punk, rock, grunge, and country-western)
- Field size: Approximately 23 ft (width) by 70 ft (depth) in the primary section

Construction
- Opened: 1980 (as O'Cayz Corral)
- Closed: January 1, 2001
- Demolished: January 1, 2001 (Destroyed by fire)
- Years active: 1980–2001 (as O'Cayz Corral)

O'Cayz Corral was a bar and music venue in downtown Madison, Wisconsin, that primarily featured local and national punk, rock, and grunge musical acts.

== History ==
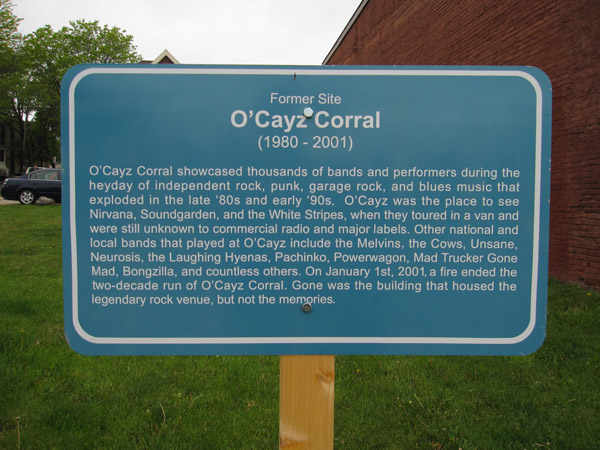
Memorial sign at venue site

Located in Madison, Wisconsin, United States, O'Cayz Corral was originally named Don's Shell (Owned by Don & Cay Millard) and later renamed Millard's Bar. Catherine "Cay" Millard became sole owner of the tavern in 1980 and changed the name to O'Cayz Corral, a country-western themed bar with a legal capacity of 150. Sometime in the early 80's Cay began to ask local musicians such as Pat MacDonald (who later formed Timbuk 3) if they would like to play at the venue, but it was not until The Replacements were booked for two back-to-back shows that the venue became well known for live music. It was operated by "Cay" until her death in 1990.

Four of the children (Mike, Mary, Pat, Don) formed a corporation "Cayz Corp" and continued the business. They then leased the club to Cathy Dethmers from 1994 until 2001. Referred to in the press as "iconic" and the "CBGB's of the Midwest," O'Cayz featured many underground punk, grunge, and rock bands that later became major contributors to pop culture.

Indeed, at one time many touring bands had O'Cayz Corral on their bucket list of places to play. Some famous bands such as Nirvana, Soul Asylum, and Living Colour only played there once. Other famous bands such as The Smashing Pumpkins played at O'Cayz several times in a single year before outgrowing the venue, while bands like L7 graced the venue once or twice a year for several years—even after they were selling out stadiums elsewhere.

People best remember two events at O'Cayz, aside from the many fine performances there. A drunk truck driver smashed into and destroyed the front facade of the building, also killing a 22-year-old University of Wisconsin student and destroying the band Surgery's ambulance filled with their equipment. On another occasion, the floor caved in on the dance floor during a Royal Crescent Mob performance.

O'Cayz was destroyed on January 1, 2001, by a fire that began in the Cay's Comic-Strip, a neighborhood bar at 502 East Wilson Street also owned by the family of Cay Millard. Dethmers reopened nearby in 2004 as the High Noon Saloon.

== Location ==
O'Cayz Corral was located on the isthmus of Madison's near east side, a short walk from the state capitol, marking a transitional space between the capitol and the Jenifer-Spaight historic district. Despite the many up-and-coming, on the cusp of breaking-through musicians who played at O'Cayz before—and sometimes after—finding success, the physical layout of the club was very small. The primary section of the L-shaped space spanned only about 23 feet in width and 70 feet in depth, and accommodated a bar and several tables.

== Featured artists ==
Some of the bands that played at O'Cayz Corral between 1985 and 2001 (listed alphabetically with reference to any live recordings released of the show):

- 7 Seconds
- 7 Year Bitch
- 24-7 Spyz
- 60 Cycle Hum
- 311
- The Afghan Wigs
- Agent Orange
- Alex Chilton
- Adrenalin O.D.
- American Music Club
- Animated Violence
- Appliances-SFB
- Archers of Loaf
- Arson Garden
- Art Paul Schlosser
- Asphalt Ballet
- At The Drive-In
- The Atomic Bitchwax
- Aunt Beaph Video on YouTube of 11/13/98 show
- Babes in Toyland
- Bad Brains
- Bash & Pop
- Bazooka
- The BellRays
- Better Off Airport
- Beyond Possession
- Big Big Bite Analog Zone on Youtube
- Big Black
- Big Damn Crazy Weight
- Big Hat
- Blanche Mobile
- The Blue Meanies
- Bongzilla Gestation, recorded February 7, 1998, was included on the Twin Threat To Your Sanity compilation released on 7", 7", and All Media by Bad People Records, Riotous Assembly, and Selfish Fucker Records in 2001. Trinity and Witch Weed were included on the He's No Good To Me Dead compilation released on Game Two Records in 1999
- Booty Fruit
- Boss Hog
- The Bottle Rockets
- The Bottles
- Brass Tacks
- Brian Ritchie
- Buffalo Tom
- Bugatti Type 35
- Bullet Head
- The Burning Ernies
- Buttress Available on YouTube: 1992
- Calexico with Neko Case
- Cattleprod
- Camper Van Beethoven
- Camper Van Chadbourne
- The Celibate Rifles
- Cherubs
- Charlie Pickett
- Chemlab
- The Chesterfield Kings
- Chokebore
- Citizen King
- Clip The Daisies
- Clutch
- Clyde Stubblefield
- Coat of Arms
- Cop Shoot Cop Available on YouTube: 10/19/93
- Cosmic Psychos
- Couch Flambeau
- Coven Of Thieves
- Corpsicle
- The Cows
- The Crossbones
- Cradle of Thorns
- Cruel
- The Crystal Method
- Cub
- Dan Hicks and the Acoustic Warriors
- Dazzling Killmen
- D.O.A.
- Damn The Machine
- Danger Prone Daphne Betty Page, recorded in January 1995, was included on Postpunkprelowfiposthifi, self-released in 1999 on CD
- Dash Rip Rock
- The dB's
- The Dead Milkmen
- Deerhoof
- Descendents
- Dick Dale
- The Didjits
- Die Kreuzen
- Dinosaur Jr
- Doctors' Mob
- D.R.I. aka Dirty Rotten Imbeciles
- Drug Induced Nightmare #4
- Dumptruck
- Droids Attack
- The Dwarves
- E*I*E*I*O
- Ed Hall
- Electric Hellfire Club
- Elephant Lips
- El Duce
- Elliott Smith
- Ethyl Meatplow
- Eugene Chadbourne
- Ex-Action Figures The 18 minute-long live recording of The Mirror, Marina appears on the band's self-titled album, released on Mafia Money in 1996
- Exene Cervenka
- The Exotics
- Fat Tuesday
- Facing Mecca
- Faucet
- Festering Rinyanyons Swimmin' Hole 7" on Train Wreck Entertainment, 1993 included the live track It's Awlright!
- Fetchin' Bones
- Fear
- The Feelies
- Flat Duo Jets
- Flywheel
- Fire Town
- Firehose 5/14/90 audio on YouTube
- The Flaming Lips
- The Fleshtones
- The Flying Luttenbachers 3/15/97 on YouTube
- For Christ Sakes
- Foreskin 500
- Freakshow
- Fred Pepper
- Frightwig
- The Frogs Tour De Gay '88 was self-released on cassette in 1989. YouTube Videos include: Men (Come on Men), I've Got Drugs/Disrespect Me, Blue is 4 Boys from the album It's Only Right And Natural released in 2025
- Fu Manchu
- Fudge
- The Funeral Party
- Funland
- Fuzzdolly
- Gel-tones
- Geraldine Fibbers
- GG Allin The first three songs on Insult & Injury Volume 2: The Bloody Years were recorded at O'Cayz Corral 8/7/86; however these songs were later attributed by GG Allin in another release as being 11/14/86. Teacher's Pet was released again on YouTube in 2023. YouTube account of the show by Bloody F. Mess:
- Glass Eye
- God and Texas
- God Bullies
- The Gomers
- Government Issue
- Green
- ~~Green Day~~ Note: Sometimes listed along with ~~Cracker~~ by people writing of O’Cayz Corral's history, but no witness remembers the actual show, no date or other evidence of these shows exist, and GreenDayAuthority.com does not mention O'Cayz in their tour history.
- Guzzard
- Half Japanese
- Hammerhead
- Hand Over Head
- Helios Creed
- Helmet
- Hole 7/5/91 audio on YouTube
- Homo Erectus
- The Honeymoon Killers The Honeymoon Killers Live! was recorded at O'Cayz and CBGB's. It was released in 1991 as a 7" on Munster Records
- Horny Genius
- House of Large Sizes
- Hum Machine
- Hüsker Dü
- Idaho
- Imminent Attack
- Impaler
- The Infants
- Inspector 12
- Iowa Beef Experience
- Ivory Library
- The Jayhawks
- The Jazz Butcher
- Jeffrey Lee Pierce
- The Jesus Lizard
- Joan Wildman Trio The Under The Silver Globe cassette was partially recorded live at O'Cayz and self released in 1989
- Johnny Thunders of New York Dolls
- Jon Spencer Blues Explosion
- Jonathan Fire*Eater
- Jonathan Richman
- Killbilly
- Killdozer Available on YouTube: 10/6/89
- The Kissers On a Monday Night live CD released in 2001 on the Skeptic Rock label after the club burned down.
- Kyuss
- Ladybeard
- L.A. Guns
- Lemon Debby
- L7 The She Devils (1992) CD on Bullseye Records was a bootleg of the July 1, 1992 show. Notable: L7's Suzi Gardner brought her red mid '50s Fender Stratocaster with gold hardware to Smart Studios to record their breakout album Bricks Are Heavy, and then brought it to their O'Cayz show afterwards in December 1991. It was placed on the side of the stage to keep it safe while they played and then forgotten. It floated around the club unclaimed for weeks. By the time the band realized the guitar had been left behind it had disappeared. It was never recovered.
- Last Crack
- Laughing Hyenas
- Legendary Pink Dots
- Less Than Jake The Less Than Jake / Boris The Sprinkler / Sonic Dolls / Mulligan Stu compilation (1996) was all recorded 10/6/96 and released on 8" flexi-disc by Rhetoric Records and Fueled By Ramen
- Letters to Cleo
- Libido Boyz
- Life Sentence
- Little Blue Crunchy Things
- Live Skull
- Living Colour
- Loomis Available on YouTube: (Date Unknown)
- Love Battery
- Lunachicks
- Lyres
- Magic Slim and the Teardrops
- Man Clam Chow
- M.I.A.
- Mad Trucker Gone Mad
- Madder Rose
- The Magnolias
- Man or Astro-man?
- Martini Gunmen
- Material Issue
- Meat Puppets
- Mecht Mense
- Megaloden
- The Mekons
- Melt Banana
- The Melvins
- The Mentors
- Mickey Finn
- Mike Watt 9/27/2000 on YouTube
- Moe Tucker
- Mojo Nixon
- Mondo Generator
- Monks of Doom One of their O'Cayz Corral shows was released on cassette by Static Attack Records in 1993.
- Mount Shasta
- Moving Targets
- Mudhoney
- Mud Wimin
- Muscle Car
- Naked Aggression You Can't Get Me Down/Keep Your Eyes Open (1992) CD on Broken Rekids included four songs recorded live at O'Cayz Corral in May 1992 by Ken Udell. The multitrack recordings were never remixed because the band lost Udell's contact information. Instead they used a live cassette mix down and dubbed it to digital. The same recordings were then re-issued as a cassette on Pop Noise (1996). The band released the Naked Regression CD (1998) on Broken Rekids including the same four recordings yet again.
- Naked Prey
- Naked Raygun
- Nashville Pussy
- Natural Cause
- Nautical Almanac
- Nebula 4/1/2000 audio on YouTube
- Negative Trend
- Neurosis
- New Bomb Turks
- New Duncan Imperials
- Nimrod 1992 video of Nimrod with Queen of Noise/erotic actress Mayuko Hino released on YouTube: Part One, Part Two, Part Three
- Nine Pound Hammer
- Nirvana Even in His Youth (instrumental) and Floyd the Barber audio from 7/7/89 is available on YouTube
- Nitro
- Nomeansno
- Nova Mob
- Nymb 11/20/98 audio on YouTube
- Old Skull
- The Other Kids Videos available on YouTube: Where The Wild Things Are, MadTown
- Overkill
- Overwhelming Colorfast
- P'elvis Videos on YouTube: Helvetica, Template, Highway Wreck, POW!,
- Pachinko When The Going Gets Tough, The Tough Get Dirty (1992) was recorded on the stage at O'Cayz Corral with producer Ken Udell. It became the band's debut release as a 7" EP on Bovine Records. However, the recording was made in the venue during the day, not during an evening show.
- The Pagans The Blue Album (2008) consists of 9 songs from their 1988 show. The compilation Live Road Kill 1978–89 (1998) had previously included the song Her Name Was Jane.
- Pansy Division
- Phantom Tollbooth
- Phantoms See You Cry and Shouldn't Hang Around, recorded by Ken Udell and released by the Mockingbird Hill label on the album The Songs that Made them Famous.
- Phil Gnarley and the Tough Guys Performing with Swamp Thing: Waiting for the Messiah and Walking The Dog 7/29/92 video on Youtube
- Plastic
- Plasticland
- Playhouse
- Poi Dog Pondering
- Poopshovel
- Pop Defect
- Possum Dixon
- Poster Children
- Pound WI
- Powerwagon
- Primus
- Psychedelicasi
- Queens of The Stone Age Available on YouTube: Video of You Can't Quit Me Baby 2/5/99 Audio of entire show 2/6/99
- Rapeman
- Railroad Jerk
- Rain Parade
- The Reivers
- The Replacements
- Resin
- The Reverend Horton Heat
- Richmond Fontaine Whiskey, Painkillers & Speed (Live On The Road) included the songs Madison and Made To Be Broken (a Soul Asylum cover), recorded 10/23/99 and released in 2001
- Rifle Sport
- Rights of the Accused Deathwish and Drew appeared on the Static Attack Live Compilation #2, recorded 4/25/91. A cassette of the full show was also released, but--like most of Static Attack Records' full live show releases--it was limited to just 20 copies.
- Ritual Device
- Rockadiles, The
- Rollins Band
- The Rousers
- Roger Miller (from Mission of Burma)
- Royal Crescent Mob
- Ruins
- Run Westy Run
- Salem 66
- Savage Republic
- Sevendust
- Scissor Girls
- Scratch Acid
- Scream
- Screaming Trees
- Screwtractor
- Season to Risk
- Seaweed
- Self Gratifukation
- The Sequentials
- Sevendust
- Severin
- Shiv
- Shockabilly
- Shorty
- Silkworm
- Silverfish
- Skatenigs
- Skeleton Key
- Skin Yard
- Skrew
- Sleater-Kinney
- Slint Available on YouTube: 8/8/89
- The Slow Pedestrians
- Sludgeplow
- The Smashing Pumpkins The Rubano Tapes Vol. 1 and The Rubano Tapes Vol. 2 included a total of 5 songs reportedly recorded at O'Cayz 1/5/90, 1/18/90, recorded by Mike Rubano, and 3/30/90, recorded by Matthew Rogers. They were released in 2022 on Martha's Music as two sets of double vinyl LPs. More songs are available on YouTube: 3/30/90, and the entire show recorded by Rogers is also available here.
- Snakefinger 4/9/1987 audio on YouTube
- Social Distortion
- Sometime Sweet Susan
- Son Volt
- Soul Asylum
- Soundgarden
- Southern Culture On The Skids
- Space Streakings
- Sparklehorse
- Spooner
- Steel Pole Bath Tub Recorded by Ken Udell and released on his Static Attack label. Gut and Hey Bo Diddly are also found on the Static Attack Live Compilation #2. These songs were then copied onto an O'Cayz Corral compilation CD that played at the High Noon Saloon.
- Sugar Shock
- SunSpot Carbon Copy on Youtube
- Superchunk
- The Super Suckers
- Surgery
- Swamp Thing Rubber Bands 6/29/92 and Mackerel Nose videos on Youtube
- Sweep the Leg Johnny
- Tad
- Tate's Blues Jam Available on YouTube: Heartstruck Blues, Little Girl
- Tar
- Tar Babies
- Tav Falco
- Teengenerate
- Tension Effect
- The Three Amigos
- Thelonious Monster
- The Tragically Hip
- Thee Hypnotics
- Thin White Rope
- Thinking Fellers Union Local 282
- Thug
- Timbuk3
- Tiny Lights
- Today is the Day Blue Bloods (2002) was recorded at O'Cayz in 1998 and released on the Rage of Achilles label on CD and LP
- Tool and Die
- Tortoise
- Tribe 8
- True Believers
- Twist of Fate
- Turbonegro
- U.K. Subs
- U.S. Maple
- U-Men
- Unsane
- Urban Myth
- Urge Overkill
- The Used To Be's 6/92 audio, 1993 audio on YouTube recorded by Eric Landmark
- Vampire Lezbos
- The Veldt
- Venison
- Violent Femmes
- Voivod
- The Vulgar Boatmen
- Walt Mink
- The Waterdogs
- The Weeds (WI) Cover of Lou Reed's Straw Man video from 11/20/92 on Vimeo
- Ween
- Wesley Willis
- White Available on YouTube: King Fat Sept 1993
- The White Sisters
- The White Stripes Audio available on YouTube: Dec 2000, 3/16/00
- White Zombie
- Wild Kingdom
- The Willies
- Willie Wisely 1997 Video available on YouTube: Go!
- The Windbreakers
- The Woggles
- The Young Fresh Fellows
- Xerobot
- XXX
- Yo La Tengo
- Zen Guerilla
- Zeni Geva Three songs digitally recorded 8/9/92 were included on the Live In Amerika (1993) CD/LP on Nux Organization.
