= Horror Story (disambiguation) =

Horror story is a genre of speculative fiction.

Horror Story or Horror Stories may also refer to:

- Horror Story (film), 2013 Indian film
- Horror Story (video game), 1989 run and gun arcade video game
- Horror Stories (album), an album by the garage punk band Dwarves
- Horror Stories (magazine), a pulp magazine
- Horror Stories (film), 2012 South Korean film
  - Horror Stories 2, 2013 South Korean film
  - Horror Stories 3, 2016 South Korean film
- Krvavý román, or Horror Story, 1993 Czech film

== See also ==
- American Horror Story
