= Blackgrass (album) =

Studio album by Earl Lee Grace
- Released: 1995
- Genre: Bluegrass
- Length: 24:29
- Label: Sympathy for the Record Industry
- Producers: Blag Dahlia; Bradley Cook

Blackgrass is a 1995 LP released by Earl Lee Grace.

== Production notes ==
Earl Lee Grace is a pseudonym of Dwarves front-man Paul Cafaro, most well known as Blag Dahlia. A review by Allmusic claims that Grace is a 15-year-old guitarist, which is false.

== Track listing ==
1. "Saturday Night" (Dahlia)
2. "Every Girl In The World" (Dahlia)
3. "Viodinah" (Dahlia)
4. "Together" (Dahlia)
5. "Riding on the Road" (Dahlia)
6. "Coyote Bridge" (Schiele)
7. "Sharon Needles" (Dahlia)
8. "Long, Long Time" (Dahlia)
9. "7-11" (Dahlia)
10. "Kitchen Girl" (Schiele)
11. "Big Vics" (Dahlia)
12. "So Good" (Dahlia)
13. "Sunday Morn" (Dahlia)

== Personnel ==
- Earl Lee Grace - vocals
- Dee Lamnon - vocals
- Karen Raymond - vocals
- Peter Straus - vocals
- Brian Godehaux - fiddle, vocals
- P. Alan Wooton - guitar, vocals
- Jonathan Schiele - banjo
- Paul Knight - bass
- Jim Mintun - dobro
- Alan Bond - mandolin
- 2-Pc. Jason - jaw harp
- Josh Freese - phantom percussion
- Wilson Gil - everything else
