= Thank Heaven for Little Girls (album) =

Studio album by Dwarves
- Released: 1991
- Studios: Smart, Madison, WI
- Genres: Punk rock; punk metal
- Length: 14:19
- Label: Sub Pop
- Producers: Dwarves, Mr. Colson

Dwarves chronology
Blood Guts & Pussy (1990)	Thank Heaven for Little Girls (1991)	Sugarfix (1993)

Thank Heaven for Little Girls is an album by the American band Dwarves, released via Sub Pop in 1991.

== Production ==
The subjects of the songs range from the macabre deaths of young ladies of the night in "Blag the Ripper" (inspired by the historical Jack the Ripper), to befriending Satan in "Satan", and to general selfishness in "Anybody But Me". "Dairy Queen" is inspired by being stranded at a local Dairy Queen restaurant in Missouri.

== Critical reception ==
Professional ratings
Review scores
Source	Rating
AllMusic	3/5 stars
Q	1/5 stars
Sputnikmusic	4.0/5

David Sprague of Trouser Press described the album as a "water-treading" release, and noted the band's shift to a metal-punk sound. The Washington Post opined that "the sex-and-violence themes of this calculatedly offensive California quartet ... are not especially enlightening, but their surprisingly melodic songettes are always invigorating." The Lancaster New Era deemed the album one of the 10 best of 1991, determining that "this slice-of-weirdness is hard as rock gets without veering into straight hardcore."

Matt Carlson of AllMusic stated that the album "reins in the disgust of Blood Guts & Pussy, as the Dwarves kick back for a celebration of pure evil."

== Track listing ==
All tracks are written by Blag Dahlia, HeWhoCannotBeNamed and Salt Peter.

No.	Title	Length
1.	"Satan"	1:01
2.	"Johnny Glue"	0:42
3.	"Speed Demon"	1:49
4.	"Blood Brothers Revenge"	1:18
5.	"Blag the Ripper"	2:07
6.	"Lucky Tonight"	0:59
7.	"Who’s Fucking Who"	0:44
8.	"Fuck ‘em All"	1:35
9.	"Anybody but Me"	1:19
10.	"Three Seconds"	1:06
11.	"Fuck Around"	1:39

=== CD reissue track listing ===
No.	Title	Length
12.	"Dairy Queen"	2:49
13.	"The Scum Also Rises"	0:49
14.	"Jonney Glue"	1:17
15.	"Anybody Out There"	3:00
16.	"Evil Primeval"	1:56
17.	"Reputation"	2:19
18.	"Lies"	1:38
19.	"Saturday Night"	2:25
20.	"New Orleans"	0:58
21.	"Action Man"	0:47
22.	"Smack City"	1:49
23.	"Cain Novacaine"	1:55
24.	"Underworld"	2:16
25.	"Wish That I Was Dead"	1:42
26.	"Gash Wagon"	1:02

- Reissued on CD in 1999 with "Sugarfix".
- Even though 24 tracks are listed, there are 26 tracks.
- Track 13 is a trailer for the Dwarves video The Scum Also Rises. Called "Radio #1 [Promotion]" on the band website.
- Track 26 is from the vinyl release of Blood Guts & Pussy.
