= The Dwarves Are Young and Good Looking =

Studio album by Dwarves
- Released: March 24, 1997
- Genre: Punk rock
- Length: 39:08
- Label: Epitaph/Theologian
- Producer: Eric Valentine; Blag Dahlia; Bradley Cook

Dwarves chronology
Sugarfix (1993)	The Dwarves Are Young and Good Looking (1997)	Free Cocaine (1999)

The Dwarves Are Young and Good Looking is an album released by punk rock band Dwarves in March 1997 Originally by Recess Records and then reissued by Epitaph Records and Theologian Records. It was the band's first album since 1993's Sugarfix, after which they were dropped by Sub Pop, and the liner notes include a 'modified' copy of the Sub Pop press release announcing the band's departure from the label.

== Critical reception ==
Professional ratings
Review scores
Source	Rating
Allmusic	4/5 stars
Ink19	(favorable)

Charles Deppner of Ink19 described the album as "some real repugnant punk rock...some of their best burnt offerings skewered on the shish kebobs of hell". Adam Bregman of Allmusic gave the album a 4-star rating, describing it as "their most satisfying record" and "the beginning of a new Dwarves, no longer a freak show, fistfight-type outfit with shows that last 15 minutes, but one that plays real songs, had a set list, and left the club unbloodied".

== Track listing ==
1. "Unrepentant" – 2:15
2. "We Must Have Blood" – 2:16
3. "I Will Deny" – 1:40
4. "Demonica" – 1:57
5. "Everybodies Girl" – 2:42
6. "Throw That World Away" – 1:35
7. "Hits" – 1.13
8. "The Ballad Of Vadge Moore" – 1:34
9. "One Time Only" – 1:30
10. "Pimp" – 1:07
11. "The Crucifixion Is Now" – 1:11
12. "You Gotta Burn" – 3:45
13. "Bonus Track" – 16:23

=== The Dwarves Are Younger And Even Better Looking ===
Side A (Alt-Versions and B-sides)

1. "Let's Take A Ride"
2. "The Wicked"
3. "Haunt Me"
4. "Theme From The Vicelords"
5. "Star 69 - A Million Miles"
6. "Ask Me Why"
7. "Come Gunnin'"
8. "Lord of the Road"
9. "One Time Only"
10. "Throw That Girl Away"

Side B (Live Radio 97 Session)

1. "Unrepentant Theme Intro"
2. We Must Have Blood
3. "Everybodies Girl"
4. "Demonica"
5. "Smack City"
6. "You Gotta Burn"
7. "Back Seat Of My Car"
8. "Dairy Queen"
9. "Drug Store"
10. "Fuck Em All"
11. "I Will Deny"
