= Horror Stories (album) =

Studio album by Dwarves
- Released: 1986
- Recorded: Willy Wells Studio, Champaign, Illinois in 1985
- Genre: Garage punk
- Length: 25:46
- Label: Voxx
- Producer: Dave Groins

Dwarves chronology
Horror Stories (1986)	Toolin' For A Warm Teabag (1988)

Professional ratings
Review scores
Source	Rating
Allmusic	3/5 stars

Horror Stories is the debut album released by garage punk band Dwarves. It was released in June 1986 on the Voxx label in the US, and was stylistically similar to their earlier Sonics/Frank Zappa-inspired output under the name The Suburban Nightmare.

The album was issued on compact disc in the UK in 1990, and again in 1992.

== Track listing ==
=== Original release ===
1. "In And Out" – 2:11
2. "Oozle" – 1:47
3. "Don't Love Me" – 1:10
4. "Monday Blues" – 1:17
5. "Mined Expanders" – 1:16
6. "I'm A Living Sickness" – 2:59
7. "College Town" – 2:15
8. "Be A Caveman" – 1:13
9. "Get Outta My Life" – 1:39
10. "Eat My dinner" (LP only)
11. "Sometimes Gay Boys Don't Wear Pink" – 1:08
12. "Stop and Listen" (LP only)
13. "Love Gestapo" – 3:00

=== Bonus tracks on later reissues ===
1. "Lick It" – 1:23
2. "Underwater"
3. "Lick It" (alt. take)
4. "Nothing"
