= Free Cocaine =

Compilation album by Dwarves
- Released: 1999
- Genre: Punk rock
- Length: 50:50
- Label: DLP
- Producer: Blag Dahlia

Dwarves chronology
The Dwarves Are Young and Good Looking (1997)	Free Cocaine (1999)	Lick It (1999)

Professional ratings
Review scores
Source	Rating
AllMusic	3.5/5 stars

Free Cocaine is a compilation album by punk rock band Dwarves, released on the Recess label in February 1999. It includes their album Toolin' for a Warm Teabag, as well as the Lucifer's Crank EP, and several other tracks. Patrick Kennedy of Allmusic describes the compilation as displaying the best of the band and described it as "fast-as-hell, catchy, raunchy hardcore punk".

== Track listing ==
1. "Free cocaine"
2. "Dead brides in white"
3. "Let's get pregnant"
4. "Fukking life"
5. "Eat you to survive"
6. "She's dead"
7. "I'm in a head"
8. "Nobody likes me"
9. "Hurricane fighter plane"
10. "Lesbian nun"
11. "I wanna kill your boyfriend"
12. "Sit on my face"
13. "That's Rock'n'Roll"
14. "I'm a man"
15. "Strange movies"
16. "Motherfukker"
17. "She's dead"
18. "Fukkhead"
19. "Fuck so good"
20. "Real creepy"
21. "Hate Street"
22. "Crawl"
23. "I'm not talking"
24. "Zap gun"
25. "Don't feel alright"
26. "The creep"
27. "Andy's poem"
28. "Fukking life"
29. "Sit on my face"
30. "I wanna kill your boyfriend" (alternative version)
31. "Fukkhead"
