= Patrick Macnee's Ghost Stories =

- Cover of the 1997 VHS box set
- Directed by: Jeffrey Fine
- Starring: Patrick Macnee
- Country of origin: United States
- No. of episodes: 6

Production
- Running time: 45 minutes

Original release
- Release: October 2 – October 7, 1997

Related
- Unsolved Mysteries, Sightings, A Haunting

Patrick Macnee's Ghost Stories, also known as Ghost Stories, Ghost Stories: A Paranormal Insight, and Real Ghost Stories, was a series of six specials that were originally released from October 2, 1997, to October 7, 1997. The specials were hosted by Patrick Macnee (of TV's The Avengers and The Howling.) The six specials were released separately and together on VHS and in several boxed sets on DVD. The specials investigate various hauntings and is similar to the format of Unsolved Mysteries. The series include such explorations as the legends of The Black Hope Horror, The Tower of London, Harriet’s Ghost and many more.

== Selected Stations ==
These stations carry "Ghost Stories" from 1997 to 2002. From April 22, 2003, to August 12, 2003, it aired on The Sci-fi Channel.

City	Station
Bloomington, Illinois	WYZZ-TV Channel 43
Indianapolis, Indiana	WIPX-TV Channel 63

== Episodes ==
No.	Title	Original release date
1	"The London Underworld & Beyond"	October 2, 1997
Segments include "The Screaming Tower", "Sweet Adelaida", "Real Life Poltergeist", "Lady in White", "You Can't Take it With You" and "Railroad Spirits".
2	"The Poltergeists"	October 3, 1997
Segments include "Alamo Spirits", "Spirits in Our Midst", "Ghosts Behind Bars", "Harriet's Ghost", "Banning Ghost" and "Hotel Hell".
3	"Spirits, Graveyards & Ghostbusters"	October 4, 1997
Segments include "Red Feather", "Legend of Moody's Light", "Spirit Investigators", "From the Other Side", "Shadows of Chicago", "Spirits Among Us" and "Star Struck Spirits".
4	"'Hollywood Ghosts'"	October 5, 1997
Segments include "Hollywood Ghosts", "Hollywood Sign Suicide", "Elizabeth Short", "Joan Crawford's House", "Marilyn Monroe" and "Afterlife".
5	"The Wild West of the Dead"	October 6, 1997
Segments include "Old West", "Big Nose Kate's", "Tombstone Spirits", "Emily Morton", "Historical Quirks" and "Calico".
6	"The Dead & the Restless"	October 7, 1997
Segments include "Wandering Spirits", "Legends", "Tofu Seller's Wives", "Native American Spirits", "Nigerian Ghosts", "The Dybbuk" and "Origins of Ghost Stories".

== Releases ==
There have been several releases over the years. There has not been a new release since the 2004 set. All releases listed below remain out of print.

Name	Release date	Ep #	Additional information
Ghost Stories, Vols. 1-6	October 10, 1997	6	Individual VHS releases.
Ghost Stories: Video 6 Pack	October 14, 1997	6	Box set containing all 6 videos.
Ghost Stories 1-5	April 14, 1998	5	All new VHS set containing first 5 episodes. Also available individually.
Ghost Stories: DVD 3 Pack	December 22, 1998	3	Includes first 3 episodes. Bonus features for this set include "Biography", "Paranormal Page", "Historical Site Page" and "Interactive Trivia Game". The 3 volumes were also available individually.
Ghost Stories: 5 Disc Set in Slipcase	April 4, 2000	5	5 disc set only includes the first 5 episodes. Bonus features include "Skill testing questions", "Informative screens" and "Direct scene access". The set is also available on VHS.
Ghost Stories: True Life Experiences	October 20, 2003	6	6 individual DVD volumes released in the UK, entitled, "Tower of London", "Ghosts of the Alamo", "Possessions", "Star Struck Spirits", "Tombstone" and "Ghost Dance of the American Indians". These DVDs include no bonus features. These volumes were also previously released on VHS.
Real Ghost Stories: Collector's Set	September 28, 2004	6	3 disc set includes all 6 episodes and no bonus features.
