= Dwarves (band) =

American rock band

- The Dwarves in 2017; left to right: Rex Everything, "Hunter Down" Martinez, Blag Dahlia, The Fresh Prince of Darkness, and HeWhoCannotBeNamed

Background information
- Origin: Chicago, Illinois, U.S.
- Genres: Punk rock; hardcore punk; garage punk; shock rock
- Years active: 1985–present
- Labels: Sympathy for the Record Industry; Sub Pop; Epitaph; Burger Records; Zodiac Killer Records
- Members: Blag Dahlia; Rex Everything; The Fresh Prince of Darkness; Snupac
- Past members: HeWhoCannotBeNamed; Salt Peter; Thrusty Otis; Wreck Tom; Clint Torres; Hunter Down; Dutch Ovens; Crash Landon; Whölley Smökkes; Vadge Moore; Dylan Weed; Gregory Pecker; Eric Generic; Marky DeSade; Sigh Moan; Tazzie Bushweed; Chip Fracture; Dark Shoulders; Andy Christ; Slambeau; Randall Cyr
- Website: www.thedwarves.com

The Dwarves, alternatively known as simply Dwarves, are an American punk rock band formed in Chicago, Illinois and based in San Francisco, California as of 2009.

Formed as a garage punk band under the name Suburban Nightmare, their career subsequently saw them move in a hardcore direction before settling into an eclectic punk rock sound emphasizing intentionally shocking lyrics. They have been described as "one of the last true bastions of punk rock ideology in the contemporary musical age".

== History ==
HeWhoCannotBeNamed in Sheffield, England 2007

The original members of the Dwarves began making music together in the mid-1980s as teenagers in the Chicago garage rock outfit, Suburban Nightmare, which was compared to The Sonics, and which has been described as part of the Paisley Underground scene. This era of the Dwarves is captured on Lick It (the psychedelic years 83-86) a 34 track collection put out by Recess records in 1999.

The band became notorious for self-mutilation, on-stage sex, and taking hard drugs. Their live shows would often only last around fifteen minutes, occasionally cut short due to injury caused by spectators. The band's sound began to evolve beyond its early garage roots with their second (nine-minute long) LP, Toolin' for a Warm Teabag, which saw the band drifting towards a more truculent punk rock sound, influenced by GG Allin. Recess records issued Free Cocaine 86–88 in 1999, a 39-song collection that shows the band's transition to the nihilistic style that took them to the Sub Pop era. The band released Blood Guts & Pussy on Sub Pop in 1990. By this time the Dwarves had dropped their early psychedelic sensibilities and morphed into a hardcore punk band. The Blood Guts & Pussy LP was followed up by EP Lucifer's Crank released by No.6 Records, as well as another Sub Pop LP, the metal-punk Thank Heaven For Little Girls, both in 1991.

In 1993 the band issued a press release stating their guitarist HeWhoCannotBeNamed had been stabbed to death in Philadelphia. Though this later turned out to be a hoax, the band even went as far as to attach a tribute to the "late" guitarist on their 1993 Sub Pop-released album Sugarfix. Sub Pop did not respond well to the hoax and summarily dropped the band from its label. The Dwarves reformed in 1997, releasing The Dwarves Are Young and Good Looking (described by Adam Bregman of AllMusic as "the beginning of a new Dwarves...one that plays real songs, had a set list, and left the club unbloodied"), and its 2000 follow-up The Dwarves Come Clean.

In 2004 the band released The Dwarves Must Die, its first LP for the indie label Sympathy for the Record Industry, which featured guest appearances from Dexter Holland (The Offspring), Nick Oliveri (Queens of the Stone Age), Nash Kato (Urge Overkill), and voice actor Gary Owens. Dahlia was assaulted by Josh Homme of QOTSA before a Dwarves show in Los Angeles in 2004, which saw Homme placed on summary probation for thirty-six months.

In 2022, Vadge Moore published My Life with the Dwarves: How I Drank, Fought & F**ked My Way Around The World, a retrospective memoir regarding his years as a member of the Dwarves. The introduction to the book was written by Blag Dhalia.

== In other media ==
In 2000 film Me, Myself & Irene, Jim Carrey is seen singing along to Dwarves "Motherfucker", which Dahlia later said he got "tens of thousands of dollars" for.

In 2000, the band offered the track "River City Rapist" to George W. Bush as his presidential campaign song. The Bush campaign did not use the song.

The Dwarves' cover of the Norwegian rock band Turbonegro's song "Hobbit Motherfuckers" from the Turbonegro tribute album "Alpha Motherfuckers" can be heard playing in the comic book store scene in the 2000s indie film "Ghost World" albeit without Blag Dahlia's profanity laden vocals. This song does not appear on the soundtrack album for the film.

In 2009, Blag and HeWhoCannotBeNamed were immortalised as Bobbleheads by Aggronautix.

== Band members ==
Singer Blag Dahlia (a.k.a. Julius Seizure, born Paul Cafaro), and guitarist HeWhoCannotBeNamed (a.k.a. Pete Vietnamcheque) have always been the two core members of the group. The lineup has shifted around them, and currently consists of members "Rex Everything" on bass and vocals, "The Fresh Prince of Darkness" on guitar and "Snupac" on drums. Former members include "Dutch Ovens", "Gregory Pecker", "Chip Fracture", "Wholley Smokes", "Clint Torres", "Tazzie Bushweed", "Thrusty Otis", "Crash Landon", "Wreck Tom", "Hunter Down" and "Vadge Moore", among others. Drummer Josh Freese appears on many Dwarves recordings.

== Musical style ==
The Dwarves are known for their simple, loud, yet nuanced punk repertoire, and controversial lyrics. Since the garage punk sound of their early days, they developed a more direct hardcore punk sound, often identified as "scum punk" due to the intentional perversity of the lyrics. Around the turn of millennium, the Dwarves developed more of a manic pop-punk influence. Bits of hardcore, surf rock, pop, hip-hop, and rock 'n' roll all factor into the band's current punk rock sound.

Their shows have been notable for some aggressive fights on stage (with the audience and even a cop), and because HeWhoCannotBeNamed performs either in nothing but a jockstrap or totally nude, apart from his trademark "Rey Mysterio" wrestling mask.

== Cover art ==
Many of the band's album covers are controversial, often featuring dwarf actor Bobby Faust with an assortment of naked women, sometimes with sacrilegious themes such as re-enacting the Crucifixion. Faust posed sodomizing a rabbit covered in blood for their 1990 album Blood Guts & Pussy - followed up a decade later, with a similar theme, this time covered in soap suds, for Come Clean.

== Side projects ==
- Former drummer Vadge Moore formed the noise/industrial band Chthonic Force with Wendy van Dusen, releasing two albums, a single, a compilation appearance, and a "best of" album.
- Former drummer Sigh Moan formed Specula with Specter Spec, releasing the Erupt album in 1995.
- Blag Dahlia has worked as a producer for Joey Santiago's band The Martinis, and is also half of the duo The Uncontrollable with Nick Oliveri.
- Blag Dahlia has also performed solo acoustic sets, which he described as his "camp counselor guy routine", released a bluegrass album, Blackgrass in 1995 under the name Earl Lee Grace.
- Blag Dahlia was a part the side project Penetration Moon, which released a sole single, "Fifth a Day", in 1991.
- Blag Dahlia has published three books, Armed to the Teeth with Lipstick (1998), Nina (2006), and Highland Falls (2022).
- Blag Dahlia sings "Doing the Sponge" in the SpongeBob SquarePants episode The Chaperone, which originally aired on Nickelodeon October 2, 1999. "Doing the Sponge" is written by Salt Peter (Peter Straus), former bassist for the Dwarves.
- Blag Dahlia's most recent side project is pop/rock band Candy Now!, which he formed with Angelina Moysov of Persephone's Bees.
- HeWhoCannotBeNamed has released two solo albums, which have featured guest appearances from his fellow Dwarves members, including Blag Dahlia. "Humaniterrorist", a vinyl only release in 2012, and "Love/Hate", a compact disc-only release in 2013.
- Blag Dahlia on Vocals recording The Who's "The Kids are Alright" with Peted on guitar of The Adicts and Cell Block 5
- Blag Dahlia sings vocals on the Royce Cracker single "Who Put the Methamphetamine in Mr. Everything".
- Rex Everything sings vocals on the Royce Cracker single "Doin' Whatche Say". The Royce Cracker Dwarves split 7-inch was released on Zodiac Killer Records (ZKR038) in 2009.
- Marc Diamond plays guitar, and Andy Selway plays drums on the Royce Cracker single "Meth Stop Calling".
- Snupac is the vocalist for hardcore punk band Get A Grip.

== Discography ==
=== Albums ===
- A Hard Day's Nightmare (as The Surburban Nightmare) LP (Midnight Records, 1985, MIR LP 109)
- Horror Stories LP (Voxx Records, 1986, VXS 200.037)
- Toolin' For A Warm Teabag LP (Nasty Gash Records, 1988, NG 001)
- Blood Guts & Pussy LP (Sub Pop, 1990, SP 67)
- Thank Heaven for Little Girls LP (Sub Pop, 1991, SP 126)
- Sugarfix LP (Sub Pop, 1993, SP 197)
- The Dwarves Are Young and Good Looking LP (Theologian Records, 1997, T53)
- The Dwarves Come Clean LP (Epitaph Records, 2000, 86575 1)
- How To Win Friends And Influence People (Reptilian Records, 2001, REP 068)
- The Dwarves Must Die (2004)
- The Dwarves Are Born Again (2011)
- The Dwarves Invented Rock & Roll (2014)
- Radio Free Dwarves (Riot Style Records / Greedy) (2015)
- Take Back The Night (Burger Records / Greedy) (2018)
- Concept Album (2023)
- Keep It Reel (2024)
- Jenkem (Greedy, 2026)

=== Compilations ===
- Free Cocaine DLP (Recess Records, 1999, RECESS No. 51)
- Lick It DLP (Recess Records, 1999, RECESS No. 52)
- Greedy Boot 1 (2005) - only available from their website

=== Live ===
- Toolin' for Lucifers Crank (1996)
- Fuck You Up and Get Live (2005)
- Radio Free Dwarves (2015)

=== EPs ===
- Lucifer's Crank cassette EP (self issued, 1988, reissued on 7-inch by Rough Trade No.6 (Karbon), 1991, KAR 13/7)
- We Kill Cock Throbbin' cassette-EP (self-issued, 1988)
- Underworld / Lies / Down By The River (Sub Pop, 1993, SP 183B)
- Fake ID, Bitch 10-inch Vinyl (2011)

=== Singles ===
- "Lick It" 7-inch (Ubik, 1988)
- "She's Dead" / "Fuckhead" 7-inch (Sub Pop SP50, 1990)
- "Drugstore" / "Detention Girl" / "Astro Boy" / "Motherfucker" 7-inch (Sub Pop SP81, 1990)
- "Sit on My Face" / "I Wanna Kill Your Boyfriend" (by Seizure) split 7-inch (Sympathy For the Record Industry, SFTRI 132, 1991)
- "Lucky Tonight" / "Speed Demon" / "Dairy Queen" 7-inch (Sub Pop SP21/163, 1992)
- "Anybody Out There" / "Who Cares" 7-inch (Sub Pop SP84/254, 1993)
- "That's Rock 'n' Roll" / "I'm a Man" 7-inch (Sympathy For The Record Industry SFTRI 280, 1994)
- Gentlemen Prefer Blondes (But Blondes Don't Like Cripples) 7-inch EP (Man's Ruin MR005, 1995)
- "I Will Deny You" / "The Dwarves are Young and Good Looking" / "One Life to Live" 7-inch (Reptilian REP018, 1997)
- "We Must Have Blood" / "Surfing the Intercourse Barn" 7-inch (Man's Ruin MR051, 1997)
- Dwarves/Royce Cracker 7-inch Vinyl/CD (Zodiac Killer Records ZKR038, 2009)
- "Trailer Trash" 7-inch (Recess Records, 2014)
- "Get Up & Get High" 7-inch (No Balls Records, 2014)
- "Gentleman Blag" 7-inch (Fat Wreck Chords, 2015)
- "Fun to Try" 7-inch (Burger Records, 2015)
- Dwarves/Svetlanas split 7-inch (Altercation Records, 2016)
- Dwarves/Potbelly split 7-inch

(P.I.G. Records 2023)

=== Videos ===
- Fuck You Up and Get Live DVD (2004)
- FEFU DVD (2006)

=== Music videos ===
- I'm a Living Sickness (1986)
- Drugstore (1990)
- We Must Have Blood (1997)
- Over You (2000)
- Salt Lake City (2004)
- FEFU (2004)
- Massacre (2005)
- Stop Me (2011)
- The Band That Wouldn't Die (2011)
- You'll Never Take Us Alive (2012)
- Devil's Level (2018)
- Damned If I Do (2026)

=== Compilation appearances ===
- 1990: Dope-Guns-'N-Fucking In the Streets Volume Five (Amphetamine Reptile Records, track "Lesbian Nun")
- 1999: Short Music for Short People (Fat Wreck Chords, track "The Band That Wouldn't Die")
- 2017: Punk against Trump (Denizen Records, track "Trailer Trash")

== See also ==
- Recess Records
- Sub Pop
- Epitaph Records
