= The Dwarves Are Born Again =

Studio album by Dwarves
- Released: May 2011
- Recorded: 2011
- Genre: Punk rock
- Length: 31:29
- Label: Music Video Distributors/Greedy

Dwarves chronology
The Dwarves Must Die (2004)	The Dwarves Are Born Again (2011)	The Dwarves Invented Rock & Roll (2014)

The Dwarves Are Born Again is the 2011 release by the American punk rock band Dwarves. It is the band's eighth full-length original album.

== Album information ==
This album marks a return to the standard thrash/punk/noise sound they are known for greatly more so than in previous Dwarves productions, the original sound of the Dwarves shows clearly in several tracks. This album follows a pop collaboration of Blag Dahlia's called "Candy Now!", as well as "Sunday School Massacre", a solo album from HeWhoCannotBeNamed. A remake of the song "Happy Suicide" from that album appears on "Born Again" retitled as "Happy Birthday Suicide". Like several previous Dwarves albums, it features the dwarf (Bobby Faust) and naked women attributed to The Dwarves, this time in a pseudo-religious framework.

Some editions of the album came with a 25th Anniversary DVD, which features live footage and the band's music videos.

== Track listing ==
All tracks are written by Dwarves.

No.	Title	Length
1.	"The Dwarves Are Still the Best Band Ever"	1:43
2.	"15 Minutes"	0:43
3.	"Stop Me"	1:07
4.	"Looking Out for Number One"	1:52
5.	"You'll Never Take Us Alive"	2:17
6.	"Bang Up"	1:55
7.	"We Only Came to Get High"	1:26
8.	"I Masturbate Me"	2:32
9.	"It's a Wonderful Life of Sin"	2:34
10.	"Happy Birthday Suicide"	1:46
11.	"Fake ID"	2:01
12.	"Working Class Hole"	2:29
13.	"F.U.T.Y.D."	1:08
14.	"Candy Now"	2:11
15.	"Do the HeWhoCannotBeNamed"	1:10
16.	"Your Girl's Mom"	1:16
17.	"Zip Zero"	1:36
18.	"The Band That Wouldn't Die"	1:35
