= Come Clean (Dwarves album) =

The Dwarves Come Clean

Studio album by Dwarves
- Released: March 7, 2000
- Genres: Punk rock, Horror punk
- Length: 21:23
- Label: Epitaph
- Producer: Eric Valentine

Dwarves chronology
Lick It (1999)	The Dwarves Come Clean (2000)	How To Win Friends and Influence People (2001)

The Dwarves Come Clean is an album by punk rock band Dwarves, released on Epitaph in 2000. It was reissued as a picture disc LP in July 2000 on the Cold Front label.

The band offered the song "River City" to George W. Bush's 2000 presidential campaign, feeling that its chorus of "I want to rape the U.S.A." was appropriate.

== Critical reception ==
Professional ratings
Review scores
Source	Rating
AllMusic	3/5 stars
The Encyclopedia of Popular Music	3/5 stars
Kerrang!	4/5 stars
Pitchfork	6.0/10

Steve Huey of AllMusic commented on the album's departure into "catchy, garagey punk-pop tunes with jackhammer electronic beats," and calling it "one of their most intriguing albums." Matt Le May of Pitchfork rated the album at 6.0 out of 10, describing the album as "trite, overused guitar progressions, incompetent pentatonic solos, and seriously fucked-up lyrics," but going on to say that "interesting sounds do occasionally pop up," and crediting the band for fully embracing "the role of fucked-up punk rockers." Westword deemed it "an oddball fusion of punk, industrial and dance." The Cleveland Scene called it an "overlooked classic" and a "slick and severe album full of potential radio hits that should have been the Dwarves' breakout LP."

== Track listing ==
1. "How It's Done" – 1:19
2. "River City" – 1:11
3. "Over You" – 2:41
4. "Way Out" – 1:30
5. "Come Where the Flavor Is" – 2:37
6. "Deadly Eye" – 2:30
7. "Better Be Women" – 2:35
8. "I Want You to Die" – 0:56
9. "Johnny on the Spot" – 1:35
10. "Accelerator" – 1:19
11. "Act Like You Know" – 1:49
12. "Production Value" – 1:21
