= Blag Dahlia =

American punk rock singer and author

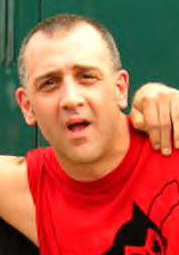
- Blag Dahlia in 2006

Background information
- Also known as: Captain Blag Dahlia; Blag Jesus; Blag Stallion; Blag the Ripper; Gentleman Blag; Earl Lee Grace; Julius Seizure; Kip Kasper; Junior High; Dominator; Astro Boy; Ralph Champagne
- Born: Paul Cafaro; May 8, 1966 (age 60); Highland Park, Illinois, U.S.
- Genres: Punk rock, hardcore punk, garage punk, acoustic rock, bluegrass
- Occupations: Singer; producer; author
- Labels: Thick Syrup Records, SubPop, Sympathy for the Record Industry, Epitaph
- Member of: Dwarves
- Formerly of: Suburban Nightmare; Penetration Moon; Candy Now!; The Desert Sessions

Paul Cafaro (born May 8, 1966), known professionally as Blag Dahlia, is an American singer and record producer, best known as the vocalist for punk band Dwarves.

== Career ==
=== Music ===
Dahlia is best known as the frontman of Dwarves, a punk rock band, which he founded while attending Highland Park High School in suburban Chicago in the mid-1980s. With the Dwarves, he has written and produced nearly a dozen studio records over a span of over 30 years. He has produced albums by Mondo Generator, Dwarves, F.Y.P, Jon Cougar Concentration Camp, Swingin' Utters, and The God Awfuls. He also released solo material as Blag Dahlia and under one of his other aliases, Earl Lee Grace. Blackgrass (1995), a 13-song LP of bluegrass songs, was released on the Sympathy for the Record Industry label using a backing band of real bluegrass musicians. He started an acoustic duo with Nick Oliveri, The Uncontrollable. He narrated the opening score on Last Day of School by Autopsy Boys. In 1999, he sang "Doing the Sponge" in the SpongeBob SquarePants episode "The Chaperone". In 2022, Dahlia released an outlaw country album titled, Introducing Ralph Champagne.

=== Films ===
Two songs recorded by Dahlia were on the soundtrack to A.W. Feidler's short film The Job (1997). In 2001, Dahlia performed "Zine-O-Phobia Music" for the Ghost World soundtrack. Dahlia appears in a mock snuff film entitled Misogynist: The Movie (2003). The Dwarves song "Massacre", which Dahlia wrote, was on the soundtrack to the 2006 film Hostel. He also narrated Chris Fuller's 2007 independent film Loren Cass.

=== Writing ===
Dahlia has authored three novels; Armed to the Teeth with Lipstick (1998), Nina (2006), and Highland Falls (2022).

== Controversy ==
In 2004, Dahlia was involved in an altercation with Josh Homme at a Los Angeles club, after which Homme was arrested for assault. Upon pleading no contest, Homme was ordered to remain at least 100 yards (91.44 meters) away from Dahlia and the club, was sentenced to three years' probation with community service, and was forced to enter a rehab program for 60 days.

== Solo discography ==
- "Let's Take a Ride" / "Lord of the Road" 7" (1994), Sympathy for the Record Industry
- Venus With Arms CD (1995), Atavistic
- Blackgrass CD album (1995), Sympathy for the Record Industry – released under the name Earl Lee Grace
- "Haunt Me" / "Let's Take a Ride" 7" (1996), Man's Ruin
- "Doing the Sponge" (2000), SpongeBob SquarePants
- Introducing Ralph Champagne (2022), Greedy Media

== Bibliography ==
- Dahlia, Blag (1998). Armed to the Teeth With Lipstick. Greedy. ISBN 9780966443202.
- Dahlia, Blag (2006). Nina. Scapegoat. ISBN 9780976403548.
- Dahlia, Blag (2022). Highland Falls. Rare Bird Books. ISBN 9781644282823.
