= Portuguese heraldry =

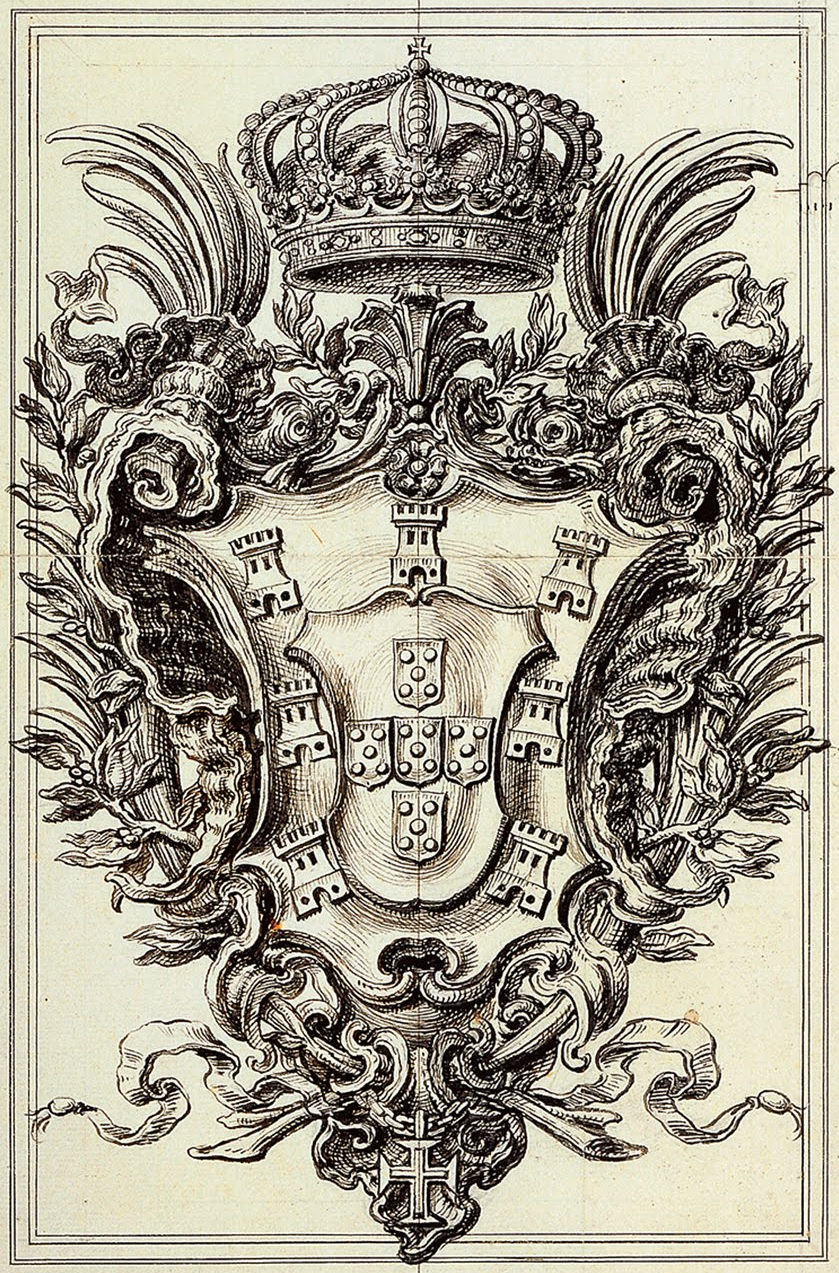
- Coat of arms of King João V of Portugal, as designed by João Frederico Ludovice; 1744.
- Heraldic tradition: Latin
- Governing body: Several

Portuguese heraldry encompasses the modern and historic traditions of heraldry in Portugal and the Portuguese Empire. Portuguese heraldry is part of the larger Iberian tradition of heraldry, one of the major schools of heraldic tradition, and grants coats of arms to individuals (usually members of the Portuguese Royal Family or the Portuguese nobility), cities, Portuguese colonies, and other institutions. Heraldry has been practiced in Portugal at least since the 12th century, however it only became standardized and popularized in the 16th century, during the reign of King Manuel I of Portugal, who created the first heraldic ordinances in the country. Like in other Iberian heraldic traditions, the use of quartering and augmentations of honor is highly representative of Portuguese heraldry, but unlike in any other Iberian traditions, the use of heraldic crests is highly popular.

== Characteristics ==
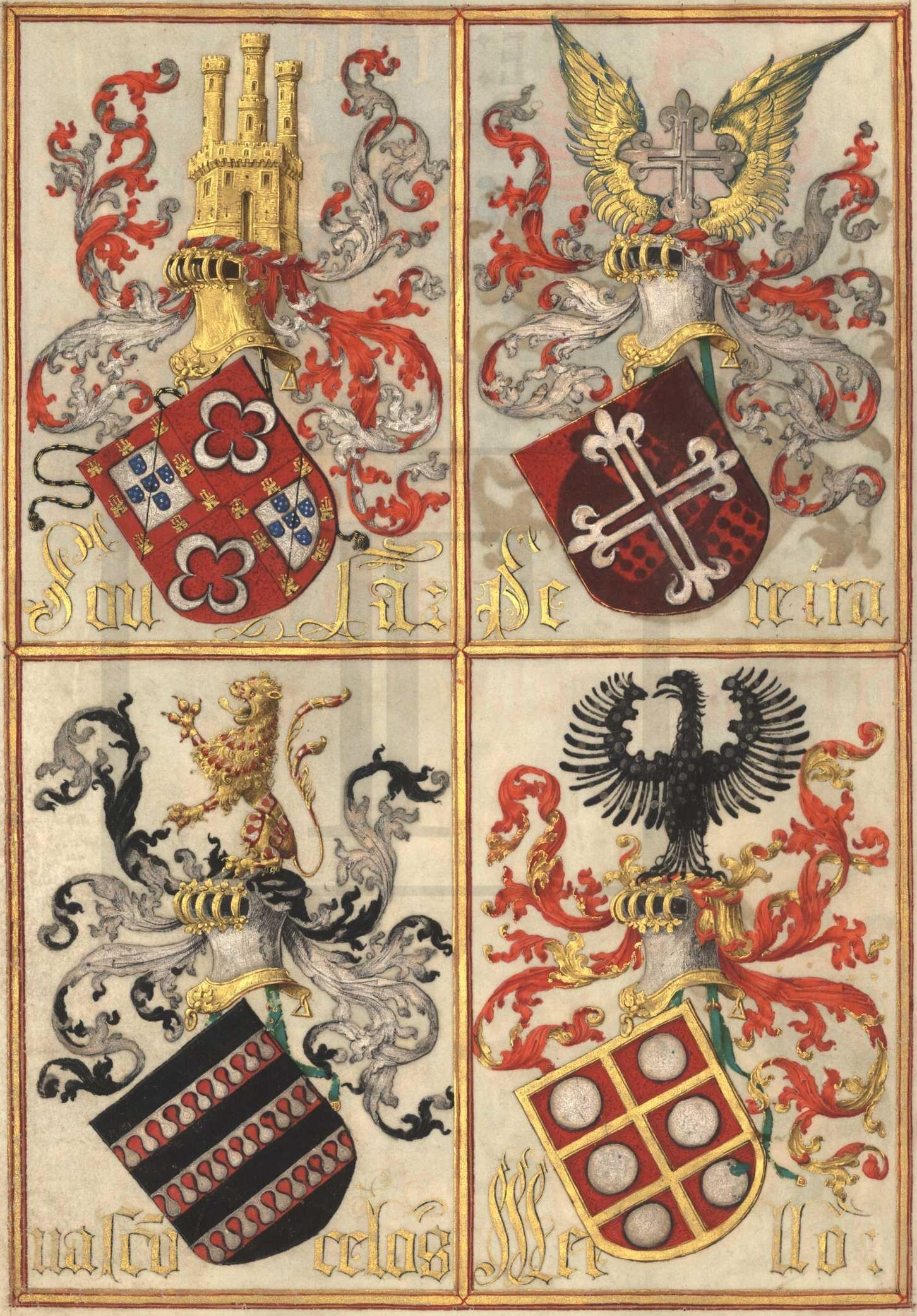
Arms of the Melo, Sousa, Pereira, & Vasconcelos in the Livro da Nobreza e Perfeiçam das Armas, 1521.

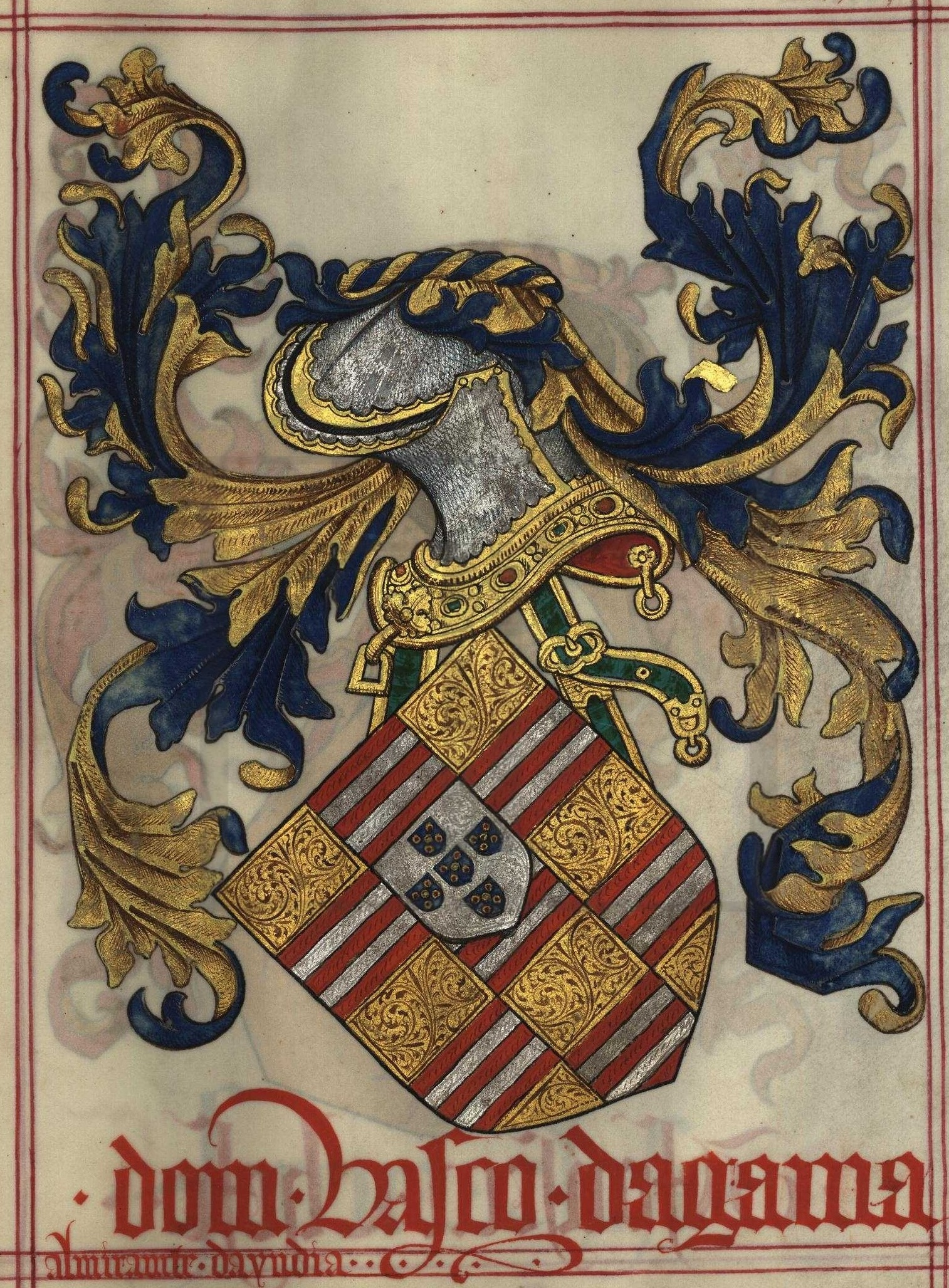
Coat of arms of Vasco da Gama, Viceroy of India from the Livro do Armeiro-Mor, 1509.

Portuguese heraldry was born within the Iberian heraldry tradition, itself a constituent part of the Latin heraldry family, and has kept many of its features to the present day. In the late 14th century it came under significant influence from English heraldry, also absorbing part of its features. Portuguese heraldry then evolved autonomously, and by the 16th century had many features of its own. These reached their peak with the ordinances of King Manuel I of 1521, which defined strict heraldic rules and established the statutes for the officers of arms.

Heraldry declined in Portugal from the 17th to the 19th century. However, in the late 19th century, and especially in the 20th, it had a strong revival, mainly driven by the high development of the civic, corporate and military heraldries.

Some features retained from the Iberian tradition include the frequent use of bordures, the appearance of mottos and legends inside the shield and the frequent use of some specific charges like the cauldron to represent the power of a nobleman to maintain and feed a military contingent and the castle to represent a place where a memorable action occurred. However, Portuguese heraldry departs from that tradition in that almost all armorial bearings are granted with a crest, which is rare in the rest of Latin heraldry. Additionally, it is characterized by the rarity of the granting of armorial bearings that include supporters, although informal ones are commonly represented in their artistic displays.

With the beginning of the Age of Discovery in the 15th century, many coats of arms came to include charges related to Portuguese overseas expansion. These included padrões, ships, flags and weapons, Moorish and African heads, exotic animals and other motifs.

Another feature of Portuguese heraldry is that when an achievement of arms includes a coronet, it is represented over the helm - when it is represented - and not below it (as is common in English heraldry, for example).

=== Shape ===
Since very early, the round bottom shield has been the preferred shape to display the coat of arms in Portugal, causing this shape to often be referred as the "Portuguese shield". In 1911, it was adopted as the standard shield shape for the national coat of arms, and in 1930 became mandatory for the coats of arms of local governments. In the past, however, other formats were frequently used, such as the modern French style in the late 19th century, the cartouche (oval) in the early 19th century, the Italian style (horse head shape) in the 18th century, the heater shield in the 14th century and the Norman shield (almond shape) in the 12th century. Women's coats of arms are always represented in a lozenge (lisonja), with the single exception of those of the Portuguese queens (regnants or consorts), which are represented in a shield.

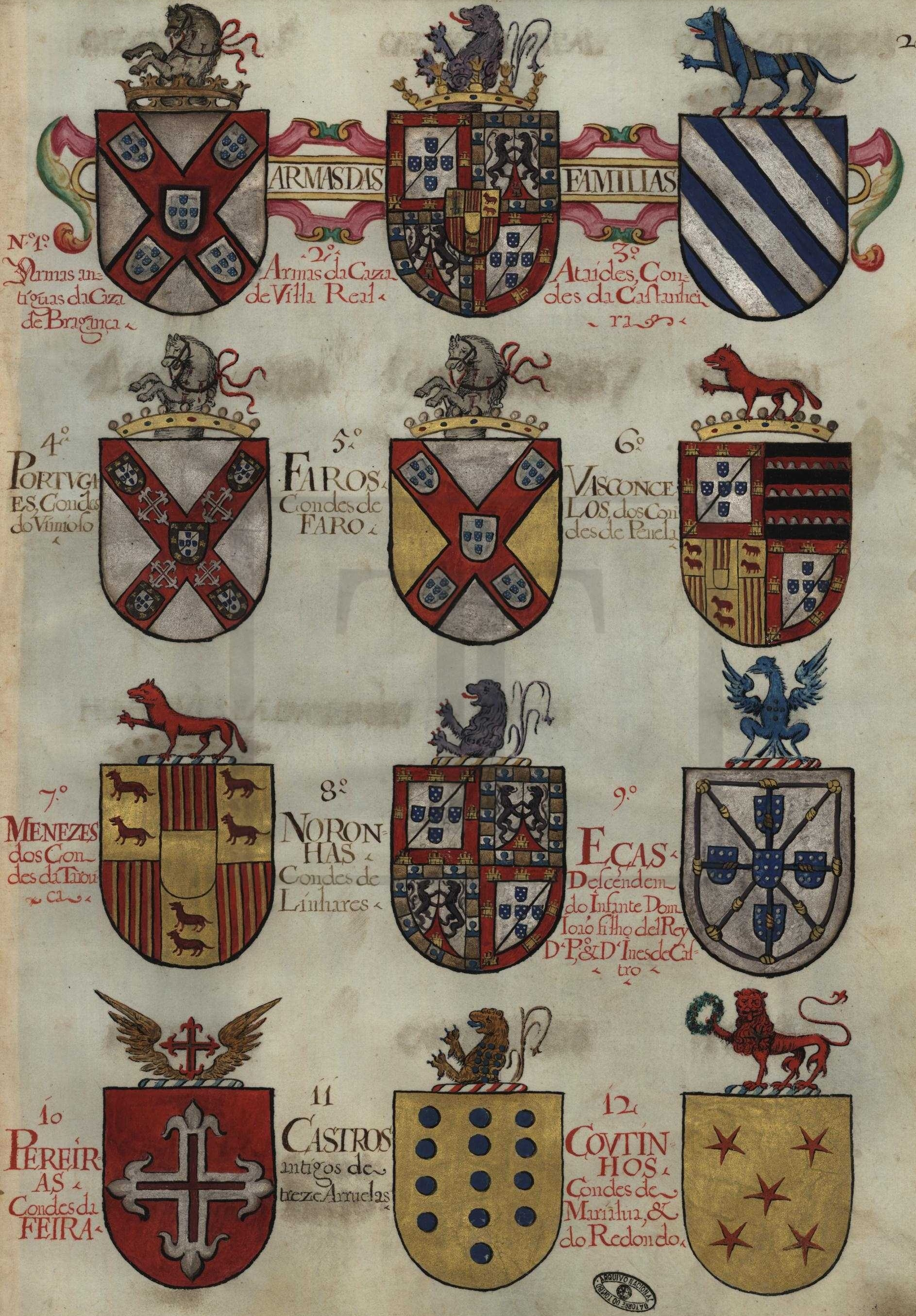
Coats of arms of principal families of the Portuguese nobility in the Thesouro de Nobreza; 1675.

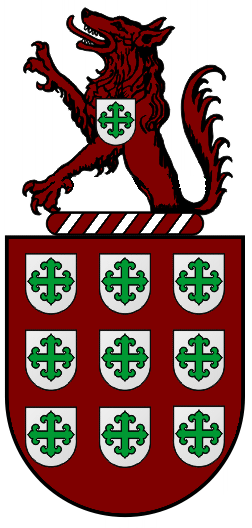
Moreira family arms.

=== Cadency ===
The Portuguese system of heraldic cadency originates in the regulations of King Manuel I. These regulations state that the head of a lineage, whether royal or common, is the only person to have the right to bear the full arms of the lineage without defacement. No other person can bear such full and undifferentiated arms, not even the heir apparent of the lineage. The system of cadency for the royal family has the same features as similar systems of other European countries, using labels to identify the order of the children of the monarch. However, the system of cadency of non-royal lineages is unlike any other. This system aims not to identify the place of the owner in the line of succession of each lineage, but instead aims to identify from which of his/her grandparents the coat of arms was inherited, this origin being signed by a specific mark of cadency, or brisure. Although it is true that the brisure personalizes the arms, in Portugal anyone is entitled to choose their surname and coat of arms from any of their ancestors, not necessarily the same ancestor for both.

=== Augmentations ===
It was common for Portuguese monarchs to grant augmentations of honour to the achievements of arms as a reward or recognition to their bearers. The most common of these augmentations was the inclusion of elements of the arms of Portugal: the escutcheon of Portugal ancient (arms of Portugal without the bordure), quinas (escutcheons Azure charged with five plates), or castles Or in Gules field. Occasionally, some augmentations were done with the inclusion of elements of the arms of other kingdoms in whose royal houses the Portuguese Monarchs had ancestors. In the late 19th century, some augmentations were done by the marshaling of the full and un-defaced arms of Portugal with the original arms of the bearers, which was a clear infraction of the heraldic rules that limit the use of those arms to the Monarch.

=== Tinctures ===
As tinctures, Portuguese heraldry uses the two metals ( Or [gold] and Argent [silver]), the five traditional colours (Gules [red], Azure [blue], Purpure [purple], Sable [black], and Vert [green]) and the furs (ermine, vair and their variations). Additional tinctures that are used in some other countries (like tenné, sanguine or orange) are not used. However, some new armorial achievements, granted in the 19th century, broke with the heraldry rules in including unconventional tinctures like azul celeste (sky blue) and carmesim (crimson). The carnation tincture is also occasionally used in the blazoning of human beings, and the description "proper" ("de sua cor") is also sometimes used to indicate the blazoning of animals or trees in their natural colors.

White (branco) is not considered a different tincture from Argent. However, probably by an heraldic error, it is so represented in some coats of arms, like those of the municipality of Santiago do Cacém (in which the white of the fallen Moor's clothing and the knight's horse is distinguished from the argent of the distant castle) and in those of the Logistical and Administrative Command of the Portuguese Air Force.

In Portuguese heraldry, the terms de ouro (Or [gold]) and de prata (Argent [silver]) are however replaced, respectively, by amarelo (yellow) and branco (white) in the description of flags. The rationale behind this is that metal materials do not enter in the composition of flags, which are made entirely of cloth.

=== Terminology ===
In English and some other countries' heraldry, achievements of arms are usually blazoned in a specialized jargon that uses derivatives of French terms. In Portuguese heraldry, however, achievements of arms are usually described in relatively plain language, using only Portuguese terms and tending to avoid specialized jargon. Examples include the use of Portuguese azul and verde for blue and green, as compared to the French-derived azure and vert used in English blazon. The hatchings in the right-hand half of the tincture illustrations are used to indicate the tincture in monochrome renderings.

Tinctures									
English	Or	Argent	Azure	Gules	Vert	Purpure	Sable	Ermine	Vair
Portuguese	Ouro	Prata	Azul	Vermelho	Verde	Púrpura	Negro	Arminho	Veiros

Ordinaries								
English	Pale	Fess	Bend	Bend sinister	Cross	Saltire	Chevron	Bordure
Portuguese	Pala	Faixa	Banda	Contrabanda or barra	Cruz	Aspa or sautor	Asna	Bordadura

Division of the field							
English	Party per fess	Party per pale	Party per bend	Party per bend sinister	Quarterly	Party per saltire	Gyronny
Portuguese	Cortado	Partido	Fendido	Talhado	Esquartelado	Franchado	Gironado

=== Particular charges ===
Cross of the:

Order of Christ

Order of Aviz

Order of St. James of the Sword

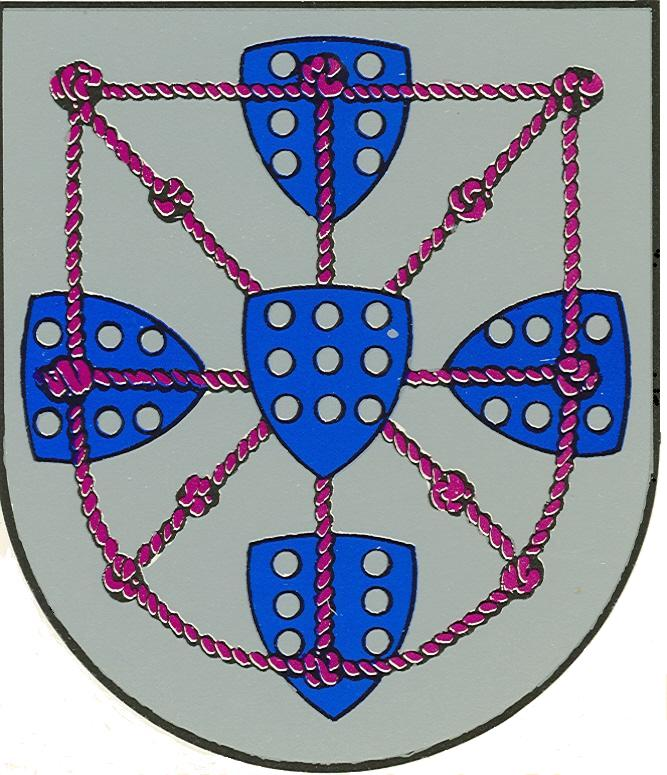
The main charge of the Eça arms is Portugal ancient.

The five quinas of the arms of Portugal.

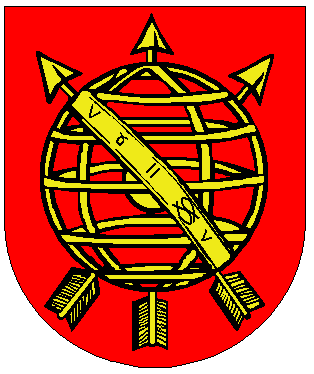

The armillary sphere, in the old arms of Rio de Janeiro (top) and in King Manuel I's standard (bottom)

Some particular charges are frequently used in Portuguese heraldry, with some of them being referred by specific terms. Most of these are related with the coat of arms of Portugal or other heraldic emblems, being occasionally used as augmentations of honor.

A quina is one of the five escutcheons Azure charged with five plates of the arms of Portugal. Quina is the Portuguese term for quincunx (the 5 face of a gaming die); it began to be used to designate the escutcheons of the Portuguese arms when the number of plates charging them was fixed at five in the late 14th century. Before that, each escutcheon was represented as Azure semée of plates. By synecdoche, the whole arms of Portugal are frequently refereed as the Cinco Quinas (Five Quinas) or simply as the Quinas. Similarly, the Portuguese flag is often referred as the Bandeira das Quinas (Flag of the Quinas).

The Portugal antigo (Portugal ancient) is the version of the shield of Portugal without the bordure Gules charged with castles Or. This designation is however misleading, as the Portugal ancient is not the real old version of the Portuguese coat of arms. The real old version of the Portuguese arms - before the introduction of the bordure with castles - was similar to the Portugal ancient, but with the dexter and sinister escutcheons lying horizontal and pointing to the center, with all the escutcheons being semée of plates and not just five plates. This real old version is occasionally also referred as "Portugal ancient". From the introduction of the bordure with castles in the arms of Portugal by King Afonso III until the introduction of the heraldic rules of King Manuel I, the Portugal ancient was often used as the coat of arms of the illegitimate children of the Monarchs. From then on, it was used as an augmentation of honor to a coat of arms granted by the Monarch.

The esfera armilar (armillary sphere) is also a charge that frequently appears in Portuguese heraldry, usually represented in Or. The armillary sphere was granted by King John II to Duke Manuel of Viseu as his personal badge when he was appointed heir of the Crown. When Manuel became King of Portugal in 1495, he continued to bear the armillary sphere. This reign coincided with the height of Portuguese overseas expansion and might, with the armillary sphere being widely displayed, alone or together with the Portuguese arms, in public buildings, documents, flags and other environments. The armillary sphere was so common in this period that it came to be considered not only as a royal personal badge but as a symbol of the country and of its overseas empire, with its use continuing even after the death of King Manuel I.

The cross of the Order of Christ, often referred to simply as the cruz de Cristo (cross of Christ), is a cross patty Gules charged with a small cross Argent. It is the symbol of the Portuguese Order of Christ, deriving from the old cross of the Knights Templar (ancestors of the Knights of Christ). As Prince Henry the Navigator was governor of the Order of Christ, the early Portuguese overseas maritime expeditions were sponsored by this Order, with the participating ships carrying the cross of Christ painted in their sails. The symbol was so heavily and prominently used in the Portuguese overseas expansion that it came to symbolize it and Portugal as a whole. As the government of the Order came into the hands of the King himself during the reign of Manuel I, the cross of Christ came to be also considered a royal badge (during that reign, being frequently represented together with the armillary sphere and the royal coat of arms) and later also as a national symbol.

The cross of the Portuguese Order of Aviz, referred simply as the cruz de Avis (cross of Aviz), is a cross fleury vert. As a heraldic badge, this cross had a high importance during the reigning of the House of Aviz. The founder of this House was King John I, who was the Master of the Order of Aviz before ascending to the throne. John I introduced this cross in the arms of Portugal, with its fleur-de-lis verts points appearing over the bordure of the shield. This inclusion was however considered as heraldically incorrect, and the points were removed from the shield during the reign of John II.

The castles or over a bordure gules were introduced by King Afonso III as a charge of the coat of arms of Portugal. Initially the bordure was charged with a semée of castles, but in the early 16th century the number of castles was reduced to eight and later was fixed at seven. There is a common myth that the bordure with castles represent the Portuguese reconquest of Algarve from the Moors, which was completed during the reign of Afonso III. However, today it is commonly accepted that the bordure of castles was taken by Afonso III from the arms of his mother (Urraca of Castile) and used by him as a differentiation of the arms of Portugal because its legitimate user would be his brother Sancho II. The castles were also later used as augmentations of honor.

== Personal and family heraldry ==
Portuguese Royal Family heraldic system
Monarch of Portugal	Consort of Portugal	Prince Royal	Prince of Beira	First; Infante of Portugal	Second; Infante of Portugal	Third and following Infantes of Portugal	Infantas of Portugal

=== Royal heraldry ===
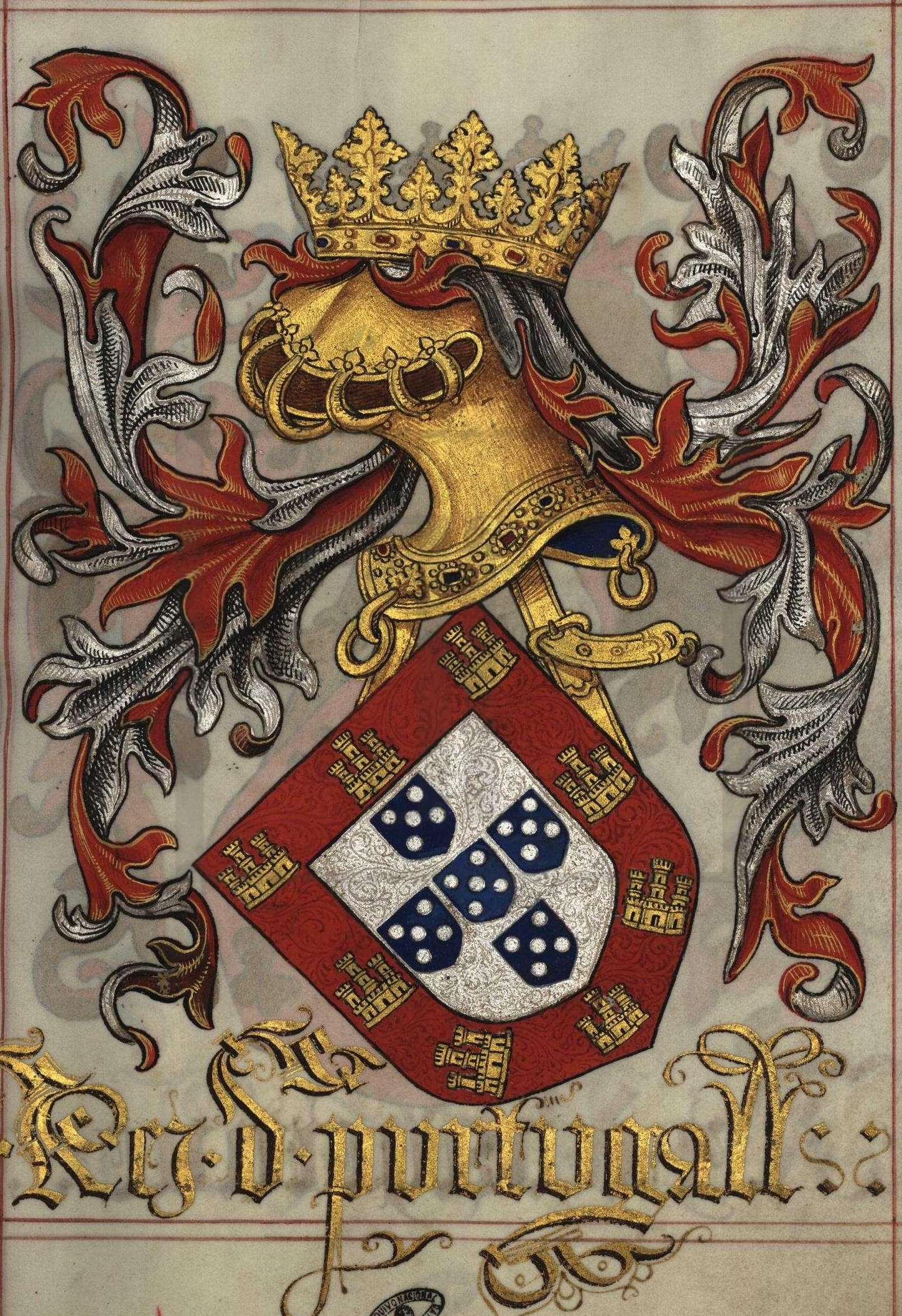
Arms of King Manuel I in the Livro do Armeiro-Mor; 1509.

Arms of D. José, Prince of Brazil.

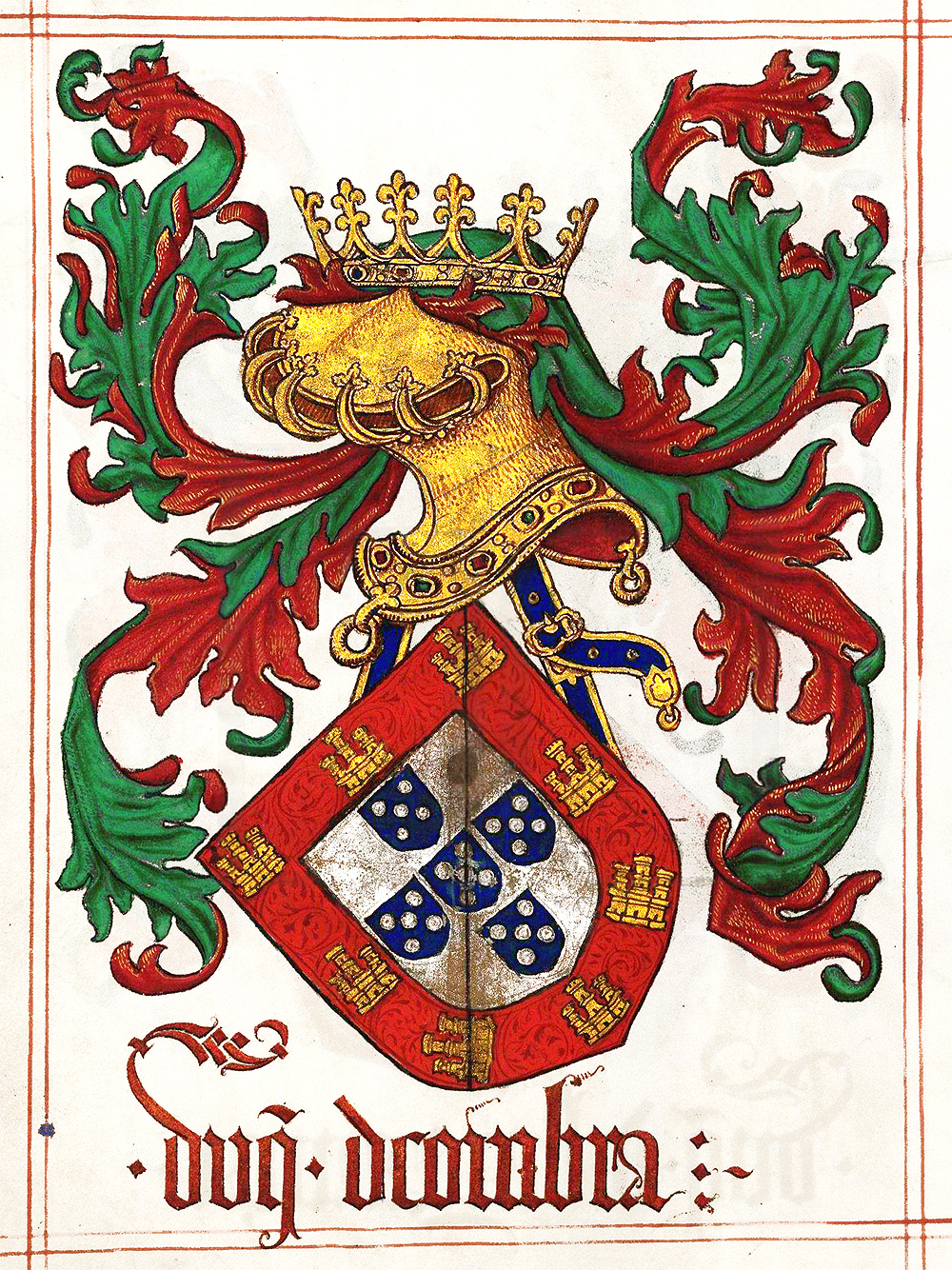
Arms of the Duke of Coimbra in the Livro do Armeiro-Mor; 1509.

Royal coat of arms during the United Kingdom of Portugal, Brazil, and the Algarves.

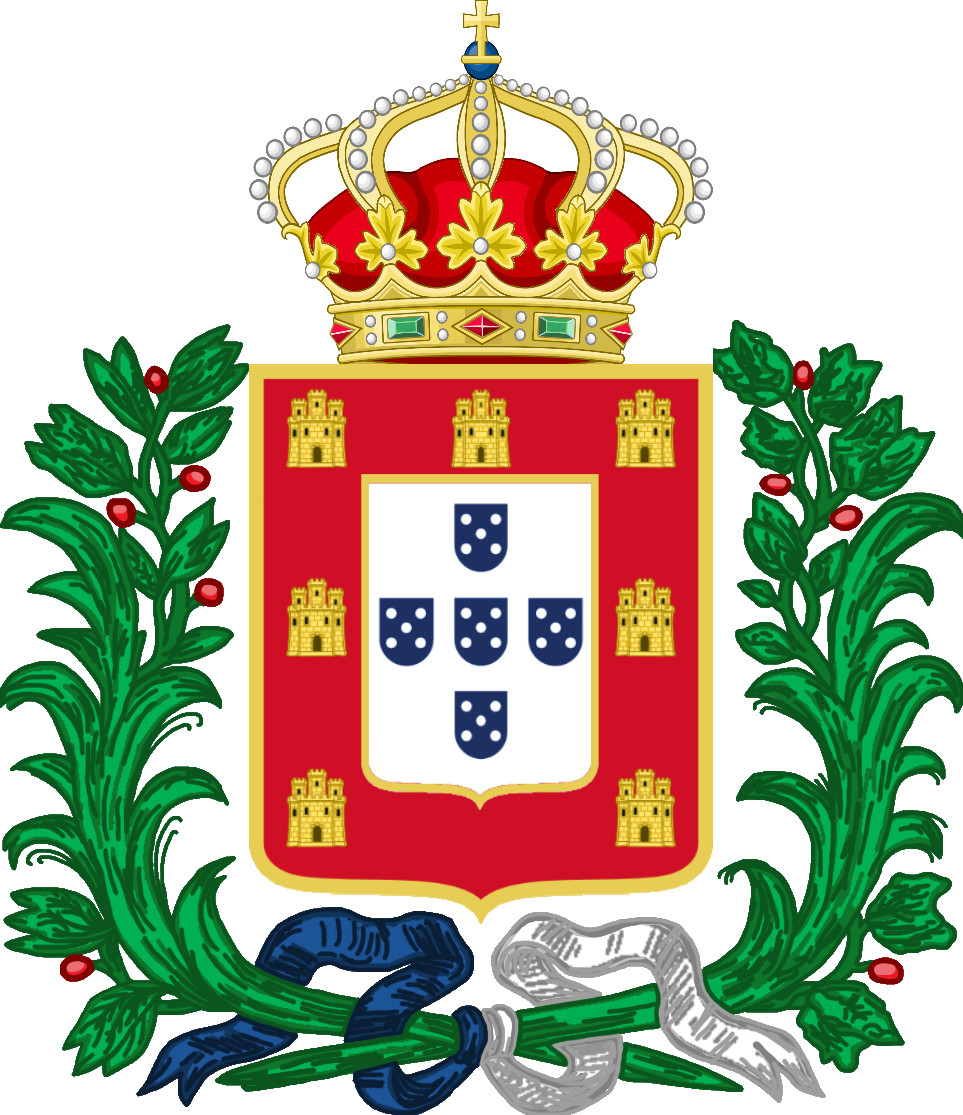
Royal arms during the reign of Queen Maria II.

Royal heraldry refers to the coats of arms of the members of the Portuguese Royal Family, including the Monarchs, the consorts, the princes and the infantes.

Until the 14th century, no clear rules existed for Portuguese royal heraldry. However, it was a practice of the children of the Monarchs to use a variation of the royal coat of arms (at that time field argent, five escutcheons azur with each semée of plates). This variation could be obtained by rearranging the elements of the Royal Coat of Arms and/or by adding to it additional elements as ordinaries or bordures. The main currently accepted theory is that the present coat of arms of Portugal was precisely originated in one of these variations, used by the future Afonso III while he was merely the brother of King Sancho II. This theory assumes that the future Afonso III assumed a coat of arms that consisted of the royal coat of arms differenced with a Gules border semée with castles Or, taken from the arms of his mother Urraca of Castile, this coat of arms being maintained after Afonso III deposed Sancho II and assumed the throne in 1248, becoming the Royal Arms of Portugal.

In the 14th century, the royal coat of arms began to be represented topped by a crown. Later, a crest was introduced, this being a wyvern Or.

In the reign of John I, a system of cadency for the coat of arms of his children was introduced. This consisted in differentiating the royal arms through the inclusion of a label, which field was different for each child of the King. Besides the use of coats of arms, the use of personal heraldic badges by the members of the Royal Family was also introduced in this reign. One of these badges - the armillary sphere of King Manuel I - obtained the status of a national insignia, being later included in the national achievement of arms.

The definitive system of royal heraldry was established by King Manuel I in its ordinances for the officers of arms of 1521. It follows strict rules that include a fixed system of cadency to distinguish the coat of arms of the different members of the royal Family.

According to the system, the Monarch of Portugal is the sole user of the undifferentiated full coat of arms of Portugal. No other person is authorized to use the full arms of Portugal, not even the Prince heir.

The consort of the Monarch uses a coat of arms with a field parti per pale, with the Portuguese arms in dexter and her/his family arms in sinister.

In the Portuguese heraldry system, Queens (either regnants or consorts) were the only women whose arms were represented in shields and not in lozenges.

The male children of the Monarch use the arms of Portugal differentiated by a label. The eldest son, as the Prince heir of Portugal, uses the label with all its points empty. The cadets (infantes) have the points of the label charged with arms of their ancestors (usually the arms of the lineage of their mother), other than the arms of Portugal. The first infante has only the dexter point of the label charged, the second one has the sinister and dexter points charged and the third and following infantes have all the three points charged.

The eldest son of the Prince heir uses the coat of arms of Portugal defaced by a label with each of its points charged with a heraldic rose.

The female children of the Monarch use a lozenge instead of a shield. This applies both to the Princesses and to the infantas. The field of the lozenge is parti per pale, with the arms of Portugal in sinister. The dexter of the shield remains empty (field argent) while the owner is single and is filled with the arms of her husband when she marries.

The members of the cadet branches had the right to include the differentiated arms of Portugal in their coat of arms until the fourth generation, when they ceased to have the status of members of the Royal Family. From the second generation on, their coat of arms would be the differentiated arms of Portugal quartered with the arms of the other non-royal ancestors of the person. The differentiated arms of Portugal always occupy the first quarter of the field of the shield.

The illegitimate children of the Monarchs also bear the arms of Portugal, but defaced with special marks of distinction. These marks varied accordingly with the old Portuguese usages of classifying illegitimate children either as natural children when both parents were not married, as bastards when just one of the parents was married, as adulterine when both parents were married but not to each other, as incestuous when the parents were close relatives or as sacrilegious when one or both parents had taken religious vows. The corresponding defacing marks would be a bend dexter for natural children, a baton sinister for bastards, a bend sinister azur for adulterine, a bend sinister vert for incestuous and a bend sinister gules for sacrilegious children.

In the late 17th century, the system of crowns and coronets to be used in the coat of arms of the members of the Royal Family was defined. From then on the royal crown (with four arches) was to be included in the coat of arms of the King and of the Queen. The princely crown (with two arches) was to be used in the coat of arms of the Prince heir (titled Prince of Brazil from 1645 to 1815 and Prince Royal from then on) and of the eldest son of the Prince heir (titled Prince of Beira since 1734). The ducal coronet was to be used in the coats of arms of the infantes.

From the 19th century on, it was common to represent the achievement of arms of the Monarchs with a pavilion issuing from the royal crown, which formed a backdrop for the shield. The Royal pavilion was purple with an ermine facing. Occasionally it was charged with elements of the coat of arms of Portugal, like quinas and castles.

=== Heraldry of the nobility ===
Coronets of the Portuguese nobility
Duke	Marquess	Count	Viscount	Baron

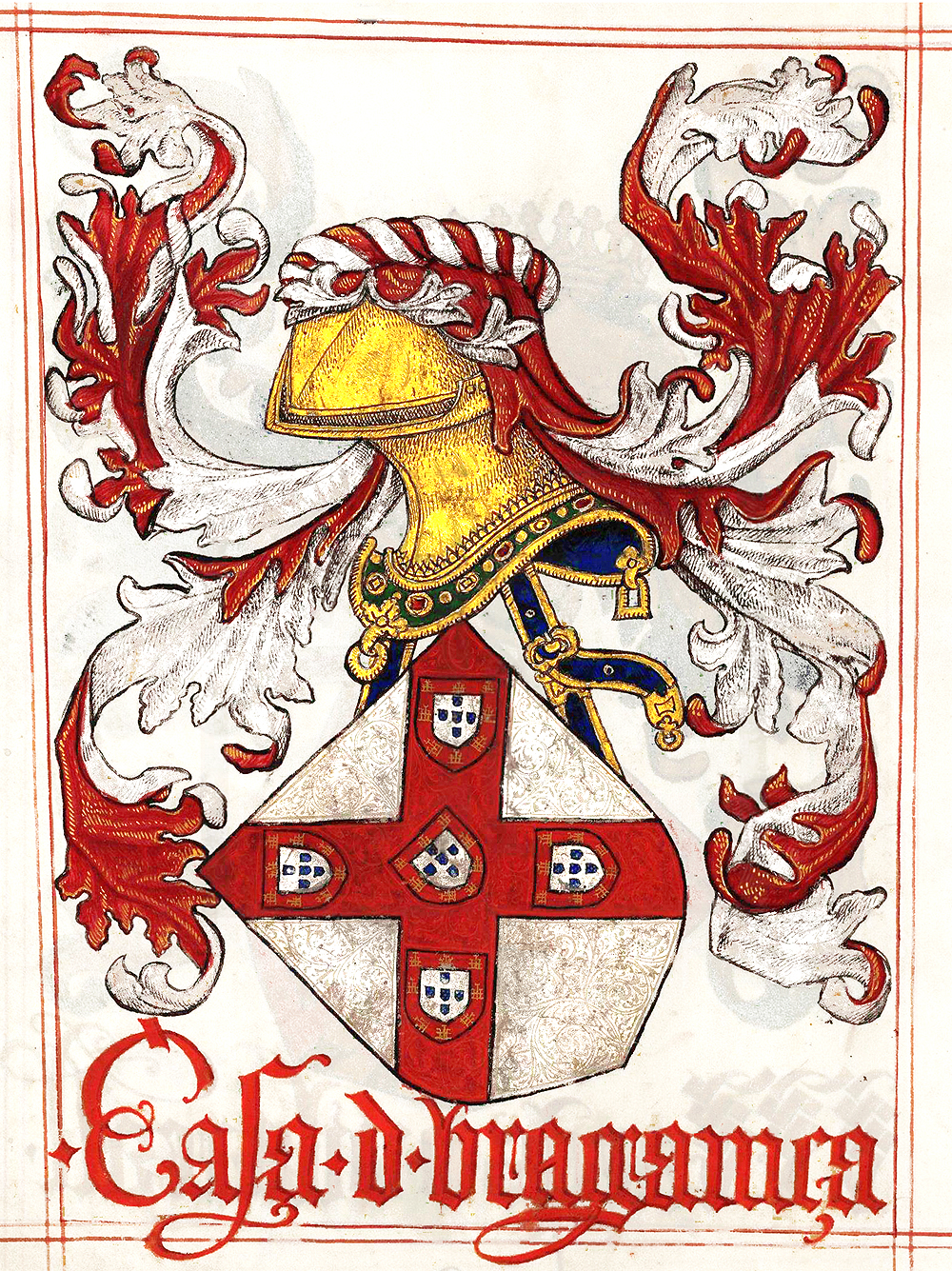
Arms of the House of Braganza in the Livro do Armeiro-Mor; 1509.

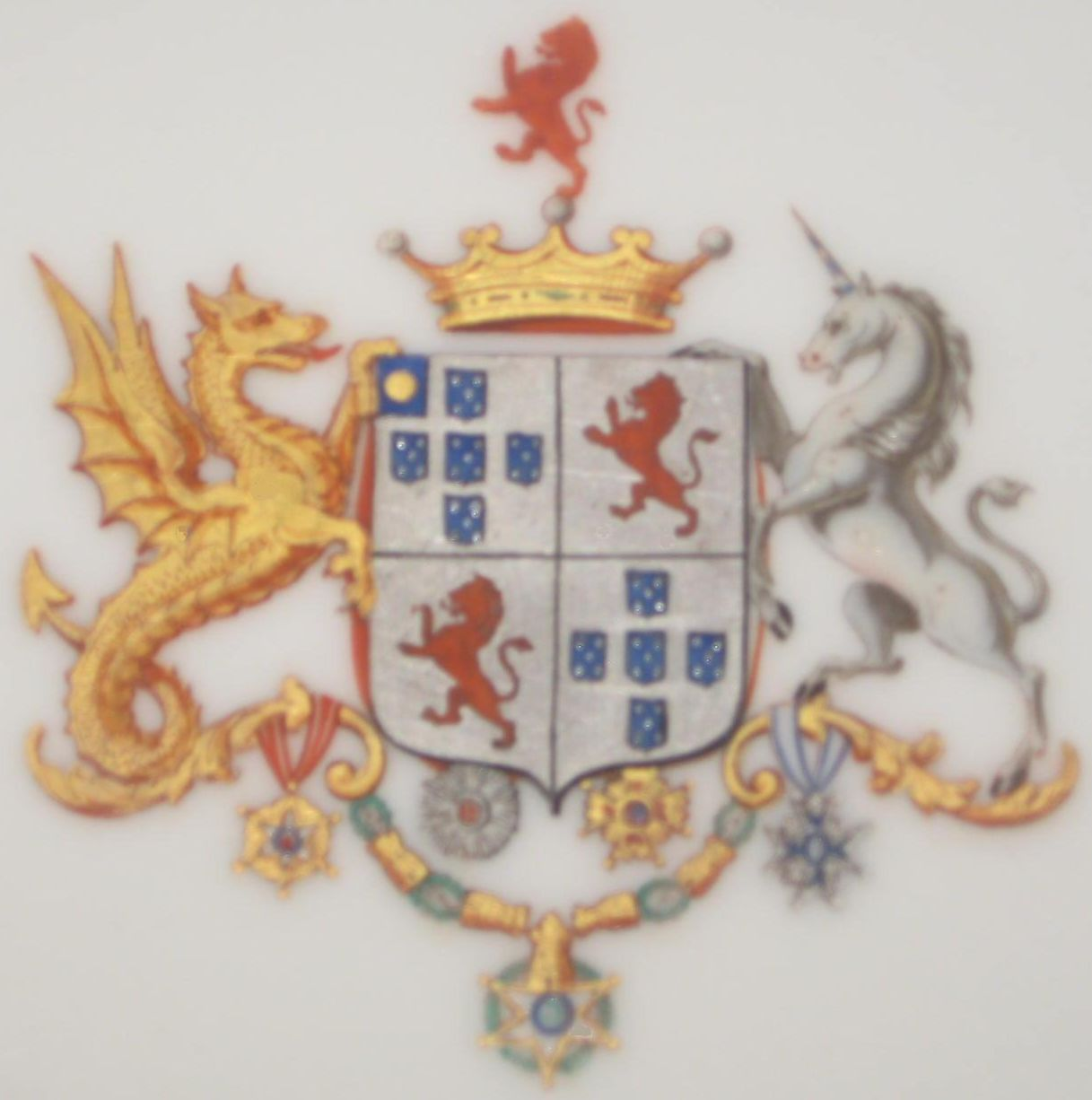
Arms of the Count of Trindade; 19th century.

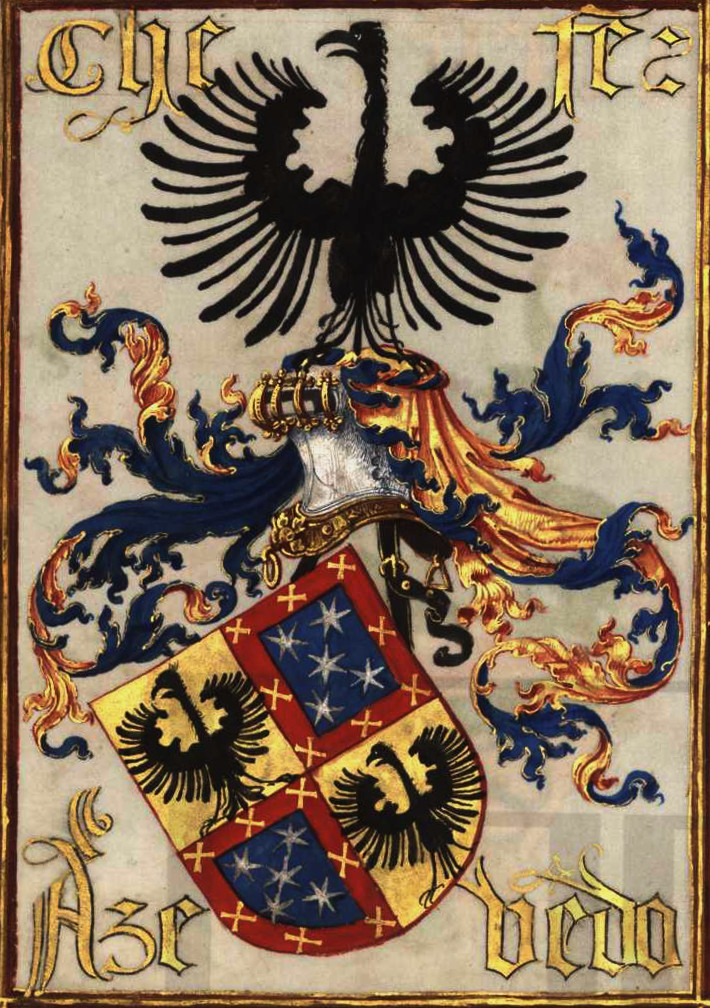
Arms of the Azevedo family in Livro da Nobreza e Perfeiçam das Armas.

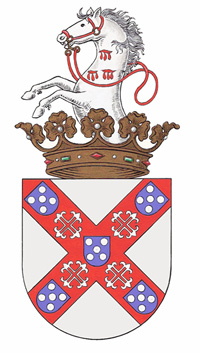
Arms of the Dukes of Cadaval; 21st century.

The system of heraldry of the Portuguese non-royal nobility applies to the noble persons and lineages that were not part of the Royal Family. These were referred as "popular lineages". The heraldic ordinances of the King Manuel I also established the rules for this type of heraldry.

These rules have taken in consideration some specific Portuguese usages that did not occur in some other European countries and that impact heraldry. One of these is that a Portuguese woman is able to hold titles and transmit them to her heirs. Another is that the surnames given to a person can optionally be taken either from the father's or from the mother's family, including surnames not used by the parents themselves, but used by their ancestors. This is reflected in heraldry, with a person being able to include quarters with arms both from the paternal and the maternal ancestors in his/her coat of arms. The chief of a lineage is the sole person entitled to bear the undifferentiated coat arms of the lineage. If the person was chief of two lineages, his coat of arms would be divided per fess, with the arms of each lineage occupying half of the field. If the person was chief of three or more lineages, the field of the shield would be quarterly, with the arms of the lineages being distributed by the several quarters.

A noble person that is not chief of a lineage bears a quarterly coat of arms, containing in its quarters the arms taken from the lineage of the father and from the lineage of the mother. These can be combined in different ways. The simple way is to have a quarterly field with the arms of the father in quarters I and IV and arms of the mother in II and III. Another option is to have the four quarters occupied by the arms of the four grandparents. All the arms included in the field must be differentiated, as the owner is not the chief of any of the represented lineages.

The ordinances of King Manuel I also introduced a kind of marks of cadency to differentiate the coats of arms of the cadets of the lineages. These are not intended however to establish the order of succession of the cadet in the family, as are the marks of cadency of the Portuguese royal heraldry and of the heraldry of other countries, but to establish from which ancestor of the person the arms were inherited. These marks consist of brisures, checkers (quarters of a canton) and half checkers, usually placed in the dexter of the chief of the field. The different marks identified if those arms came from the paternal grandfather (brisure), the paternal grandmother (half checker charged with a brisure), the maternal grandfather (checker charged with a brisure) or the maternal grandmother (checker charged with a cushion and this with a brisure).

The rules for the coats of arms of the illegitimate children of popular lineages were similar to those of the Royal Family. So, their arms would be defaced by a baton sinister, a bend dexter, a bend sinister azur, a bend sinister vert or a band sinister gules depending on the type of illegitimacy. Regarding the natural children of popular lineages, there were more precise rules than those for the natural children of the Royal Family. The defacing of the arms of a simple natural child would also be a single baton sinister. However, if the father of the child was also a natural child the defacing would be two batons. If both the father and the grandfather would also be natural children, the batons would be three. On the other side, the legitimate descendants of natural children would have a diminutive baton sinister, that would finally disappear from the coat of arms after a number of legitimate generations.

Women from the popular lineages that were holder of titles, landladies of territories with jurisdiction or ladies lieutenants (alcaidessas) had also the right to bear coats of arms. All the above rules applied to women's coats of arms, but these would be represented in lozenges and not in shields.

In the late 16th, a system of coronets similar to those used in other European countries was introduced, with the particularity that, in Portugal, those who had only the titles of baron and viscount but had the status of Grandee had the right to bear the coronet of count.

In the 19th century, during the period of Constitutional Monarchy, the peers of the Kingdom and the counselors of State had the right to bear a coat of arms including a black mantle with ermine facing issuing from the coronet.

=== Burgher arms ===
Until the reign of King John I there were apparently no restrictions on the use of burgher arms in Portugal. The first restriction appeared in this reign, with the ban of the use of the or tincture in these types of arms.

During the reign of King Afonso V, burgher arms were restricted to the use of colours only, with both metals being banned.

This restriction would become irrelevant when King Manuel I forbade the use of arms to those who were not of the Portuguese nobility. This restriction against burgher arms in Portugal lasted until the end of the Monarchy in 1910, although, by that time, it was very common to a burgher who stood out in politics, commerce, industry, agriculture, military or other matters, to be ennobled and so to become entitled to bear a coat of arms.

== Civic heraldry ==
The present coat of arms of Portugal.

=== National heraldry ===
Portuguese national heraldry evolved from the royal heraldry, with the royal coat of arms gradually coming to be considered a national coat of arms.

The present national achievement of arms of Portugal was established in 1910, after the replacement of the Monarchy by the republic. As its central element, the traditional Portuguese shield was kept. This was placed over an armillary sphere. The achievement of arms has three main versions. The simpler includes only the shield over the armillary sphere, and is so displayed in the National Flag.

In the second version, used in the national colors of military units, the armillary sphere is surrounded by two branches of laurel, tied in the base with a white scroll with Camões' verse "Esta é a ditosa Pátria minha amada" (This is my beloved blissful Homeland). The final version, intended to be used in seals, coins and other badges, is similar to the second version, but the scroll does not include the verse and is usually represented in red and green.

Evolution of the escutcheon
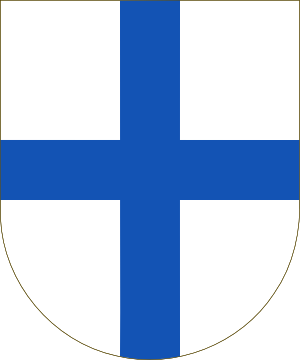
1095?–1139?

1139?–1247

1248–1385

1385–1481

1481–present

The Portuguese shield itself is the result of about 300 years of evolution, from the 12th to the 15th centuries. The putative initial shield used by Afonso Henriques, who became the first King of Portugal, was field argent with a cross azur. This evolved to a field argent with five escutcheons azur forming a cross, the dexter and sinister ones pointing to the center, with each escutcheon semée of plates. When Afonso III became King in 1247, he maintained the shield he used as brother of King Sancho II: the then Portuguese shield added with a bordure gules semée of castles or. When the master of the Order of Aviz became King in 1385, as John I, the cross of the order (cross vert with fleur-de-lis in its points) was inserted in the shield, with its points appearing in the bordure gules, between the castles or. Later, the semée of plates of each of the five escutcheons gradually evolved to fixed five plates disposed in saltire and, because of this, each of these escutcheons started to be known as quina (the face "five" of a dice). By synecdoche, the Portuguese shield started to be referred as the five quinas or simply as the quinas. Finally, in 1481, King John II ordered the correction of the Portuguese shield, eliminating its features identified as heraldic errors. So, the cross of the Order of Aviz was taken off and the dexter and sinister escutcheons were set upright. Later the semée of castles or of the bordure evolved to seven fixed castles, this being the version in use today.

=== Municipal heraldry ===
Mural crowns of the municipalities of Portugal
Capital	Cities	Towns	Parishes

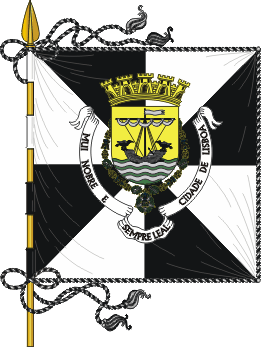
Standard of Lisbon.

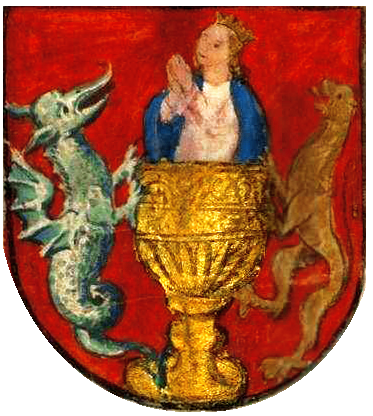
Coat of arms of Coimbra in the Thesouro de Nobreza; 1675.

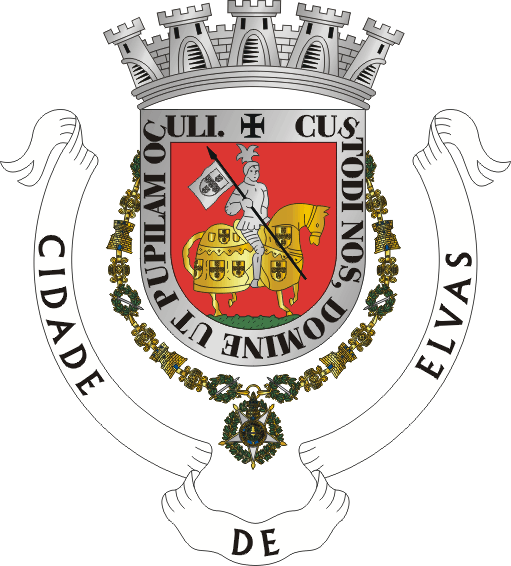
Coat of arms of Elvas, Alentejo.

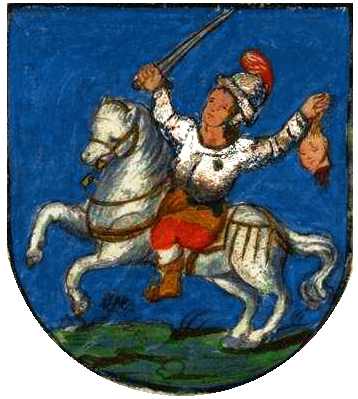
Coat of arms of Évora in the Thesouro de Nobreza; 1675.

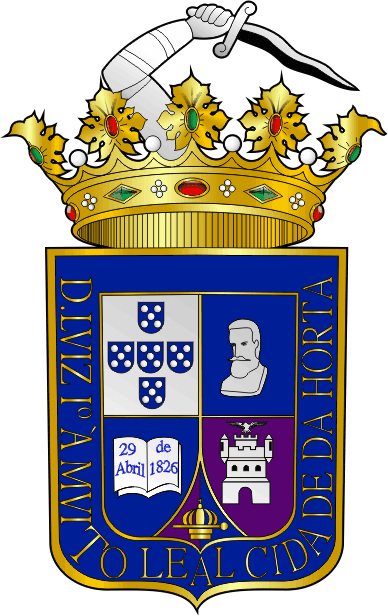
Arms of Horta, Azores.

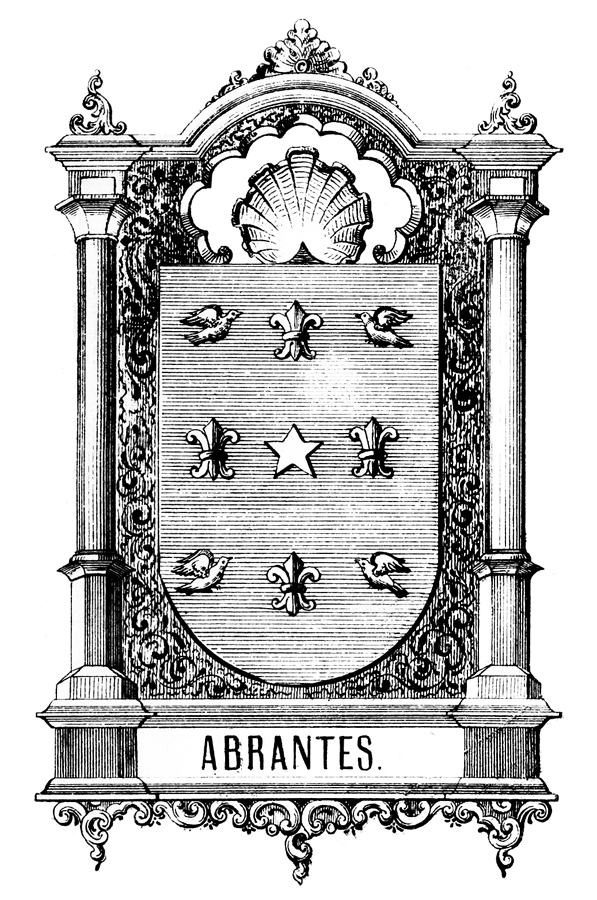
Arms of the city of Abrantes; 19th century.

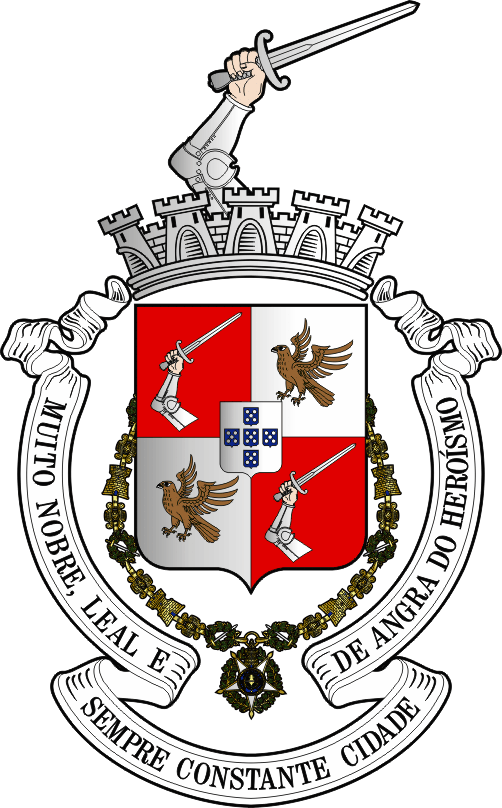
Arms of Angra do Heroísmo.

Portuguese municipal heraldry includes the heraldic symbols — including coats of arms, flags and seals — of the local governments of Portugal, that is, the municipalities and freguesias (civil parishes).

Municipal heraldry has a long tradition in Portugal, with city, town and municipal heraldic insignia appearing as early as the 12th century. The oldest example known is the coat of arms of the former municipality of Castelo Mendo, dated from 1202. These insignia were mainly used in seals, in ceremonial flags, in the municipal halls and in the public infrastructures built by the municipalities (such as fortifications, fountains, aqueducts and bridges). Until the 19th century, the assumption of coats of arms by the municipalities was the rule, with the right to bear heraldic insignia and the right to choose their design being understood by the municipalities as one of the prerogatives of their old autonomy. Thus, the creation of municipal coats of arms did not usually pass through the officers of arms of the Crown. In the 19th century, however, some municipal coats of arms started to be granted centrally by the Crown.

The revival of heraldry in Portugal in the 20th century was much driven by a large revival in the field of municipal heraldry. Despite the restrictions on heraldry imposed by the Republican regime 1910, many municipalities expressed the desire to continue to bear arms and, in the case of some municipalities that had not had them before, even to obtain new arms. Marinha Grande was one of these municipalities, and its intention to bear a coat of arms would trigger the high development of the municipal heraldry in Portugal. In the 1920s, the recently created Municipal Council of Marinha Grande expressed the desire to bear arms, but did not find any authority capable of creating it. It then appealed to the general public through the press. The appeal was answered by Afonso Dornellas, an heraldic specialist and member of the Portuguese Association of Archaeologists, who presented a proposal for coat of arms, flag and seal designs for the Marinha Grande municipality. This proposal was approved and adopted by the respective Municipal Council. At the same time, Dornellas created a draft of regulation for the municipal heraldry.

On 14 April 1930, the Ministry of the Interior, through its Directorate General of Political and Civil Administration, issued a circular letter defining the heraldic standards to be used in the coat of arms, flags and seals of all municipalities. These were based on the regulation draft created by Dornellas. The municipal heraldic rules were reformed in 1991, but the basic standard rules established in 1930 were kept and are still in force. Most of the municipal arms were then gradually reformed in order to comply with the standard rules. In most cases, the reform kept the basic design of the original coat of arms, occasionally with a mere adjustment of the tinctures and charges in order to fully comply with the heraldic rules. However, in many cases the standardization led to a radical change, with completely new designs being introduced in some cases. While the blazon of the old municipal coat of arms tended to have an erudite meaning, with frequent references to the history of the municipality or puns regarding their names, the blazon of the municipal coat of arms introduced after 1930 tended to have more mundane meanings, frequently referring to their economical activities or landmarks. This resulted in the frequent repetition of some charges (like bunches of grapes representing the local production of wine or castles representing the existence of castles in the area), which made many of the coats of arms very similar to each other. Some municipalities refused to abandon their traditional and distinctive heraldic emblems and maintained them, even if they were non-conforming to the new standards. Caldas da Rainha, for example, kept the coat of arms that was bestowed upon the settlement by Queen Leonor and Horta kept the coat of arms granted to the city, together with the title "most loyal" bestowed by King Louis I in 1865. Angra do Heroísmo, despite having its traditional coat of arms replaced in 1939 by a completely new design intended to be standards-compliant, decided in 2013 to readopt its old coat of arms granted to the city by Queen Mary II in 1837, even though it defied the standards in the inclusion of a crest, in the divisions of the field and in not using the round bottom shape shield.

Accordingly, with Law no. 53/1991 of 7 August 1991, the Portuguese municipalities, freguesias, cities and towns had the right to bear three types of standardized heraldic symbols: the coat of arms, the flag and the seal.

Coats of arms follow a standard design that consists of a shield topped by a mural crown and under it a scroll. The shield is required to be of the round-bottom shape (Portuguese shield). The mural crown defines the rank of the seat of the local government, being five apparent towers or for Lisbon as the capital city, five towers argent for the other cities, four towers argent for towns and three towers argent for villages and urban freguesias. The scroll contains the name of the seat of the municipality or freguesia, including possible honorific titles associated with it. Alternatively, the scroll may include a motto, although this is very rare. The coat of arms may also include the insignias of the decorations awarded to the municipality or freguesia.

The blazon of the shield must obey the general Portuguese heraldry rules, which follow general European tradition. Some of the specific Portuguese heraldic norms followed include the interdiction of the inclusion of the Portuguese shield (unless it is defaced), the use of only the seven traditional tinctures (excluding others like the orange allowed in the heraldry of some other countries), and the permission to use mottos and legends inside the field of the shield. In municipal heraldry there is also the interdiction of the use of divisions of the field that cause a split in their meaningful whole.

The flags of the municipalities and freguesias may follow one of the following three standard designs, regarding their field: gyronny of eight pieces, quarterly or single tincture. Tinctures used are those corresponding to the dominant metal and/or color of the coat of arms. Following the Portuguese usage for blazoning flags, or and argent are not used, being respectively replaced by yellow and white. Flags with a gyronny field are reserved for cities. Regarding the other two designs, although not a mandatory rule, recent practice has been to give quarterly flags to towns and flags with a single tincture to the rest of the freguesias. There are two shapes of flags, according to the intended use. The first type is the standard, to be used as parade flag. This is square with a side of 1 meter, made of silk, with the coat of arms represented in the center of its field. Standards are bordered by a cord in the dominant metal and color, ending in tassels and tied to a golden staff and spear. The other type are the flags to be flown from fixed staffs, flagpoles or halyards. These are rectangular, with a proportion of 2:5 and with no fixed dimensions. The flags of this type may include the coat of arms or not (with exception of flags with a single tincture, which always include it).

The seals are always round and consist of a central circle surrounded by a bordure. The central circle contains the charges of the coat of arms, but without the tinctures. The bordure contains the name of the body of government of the municipality or freguesia.

=== Regional heraldry ===
The regional heraldry refers to the coat of arms used by the regional level (above municipal level) self-governing entities of Portugal. Although provinces, autonomous districts and other self-governing entities existed in the past, at present the only such entities these type are the autonomous regions of Azores and Madeira. In contrast with the municipal heraldry, there is no regional heraldry tradition in Portugal.

Unused mural crown for the Administrative Regions.

The local government heraldry law of 1991 also defines the standards for the coats of arms and flags of the administrative regions. These are envisioned in the Portuguese Constitution as regional local government entities of mainland Portugal, but were never created, so their heraldry was also never implemented. The administrative regions would also have the right to bear arms, seal and flag, with similar features to those of the municipalities. The arms would be topped by a special mural crown similar to that of the city of Lisbon, but with a quina alternating with each tower. The flags would be a gyronny of sixteen pieces.

In contrast, the Portuguese autonomous regions were implemented. They established their own heraldry, case by case by the regions' own governing bodies within the scope of their developed powers, not following any specific standards besides the general rules of heraldry. Both the regional achievement of arms of the Azores and that of Madeira follow a model inspired by the old Portuguese royal heraldry. The shield of Madeira, together with its seal and flag, was established in 1978, but its complete achievement of arms (with the addition of supporters, motto, helmet and crest) was only established in 1991. The arms of the Azores were established in 1979, as well as their seal and flag. Before that, however, a heraldic charge identifying Azores (a flying goshawk (açor) or with a quina in its claws) was already in use, inserted in the chief of the coats of arms of many municipalities of the Region.

Coats of arms of the regions of Portugal
Autonomous Region; Azores	Autonomous Region; Madeira	Former Kingdom of The Algarve

Besides the two autonomous regions, the region of the Algarve, although not existing as a legal personality, is also occasionally collectively identified by a coat of arms: the putative coat of arms of the ancient honorary Kingdom of the Algarve, consisting of a quarterly shield, with the head of a Christian king in the I and IV, and the head of a Moor in the II and III. The fields of the I and IV are usually represented in Or and those of the II and III in Gules, although variations occur. Elements of this coat of arms were included in the arms of most of the Algarve municipalities (usually the Christian king and Moor heads in the chief). Some regional and local organizations also use the Algarve coat of arms or include elements of it in their own emblems.

== Military heraldry ==
Version of the Coat of arms of Portugal used by the Portuguese Armed Forces.

Military heraldry is the youngest branch of Portuguese heraldry. Each branch of the Armed Forces and the Republican National Guard (GNR) has its own system of heraldry, that also includes their heraldic vexillology.

Before the 20th century, the Portuguese military made only rare use of heraldry, besides use of the royal and national coats of arms. In contrast with the usage of other militaries, even the use of particular badges, insignia or mottos was rare in the Portuguese military units. In the late 1920s, the Portuguese Army started a policy of reviving its units' historical traditions. As part of its policy, mottos were introduced for some units in the late 1920s, and units' semi-heraldic guidons were introduced in the early 1930s. In the late 1940s and early 1950s, the first unit's coat of arms were introduced, although in most cases these consisted of non-heraldic designs. In 1953, the Portuguese Institute of Heraldry proposed a system of rules to construct heraldically compliant coats of arms for the Army. Some units adopted coats of arms following these rules.

In 1964 the Army finally started to experiment with the implementation of a regulation of heraldry and symbology, establishing strict heraldic compliance rules for the creation of coats of arms and heraldic flags for the units. A particular characteristic of these rules was the use of the heater shield in the coat of arms, instead of the traditional Portuguese shield with a round point proposed in the 1950s. Although an Army heraldic coronet was established, this was rarely used, with the coat of arms usually represented in a similar way to personal heraldry, with the shield topped by a helm and this by a crest. These regulations became official in 1969.

The other branches of the Armed Forces followed the Army in implementing processes of heraldic regulation. In 1960, the Portuguese Air Force established a regulation of vexillology that also defined the unit's coat of arms to be inserted in their guidons. Most of these coats of arms consisted of non-heraldic designs. The Portuguese Navy established several regulations for the guidons of their units in the 1960s, but not rules for coats of arms. The Navy adopted its own heraldic regulation in 1972, similar to the Army regulation but preferring the use of round-bottom shields, and with the units' coats of arms being always represented topped by a naval coronet. The Air Force implemented its own heraldic regulation in 1985, based on the Army standards but with the unit's coat of arms always represented topped with an aeronautical coronet.

Meanwhile, the Army changed its heraldry regulation in 1987, with deep changes in heraldic vexillology and also some changes in the heraldry itself. These changes were not adopted by the other branches, which makes the Army's heraldry, especially the vexillology, markedly different from those of the Navy and the Air Force.

=== Army heraldry ===
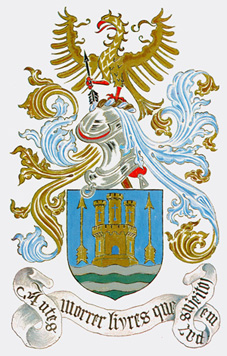
Coat of arms of the Regimento de Guarnição n.º 1 of the Portuguese Army.

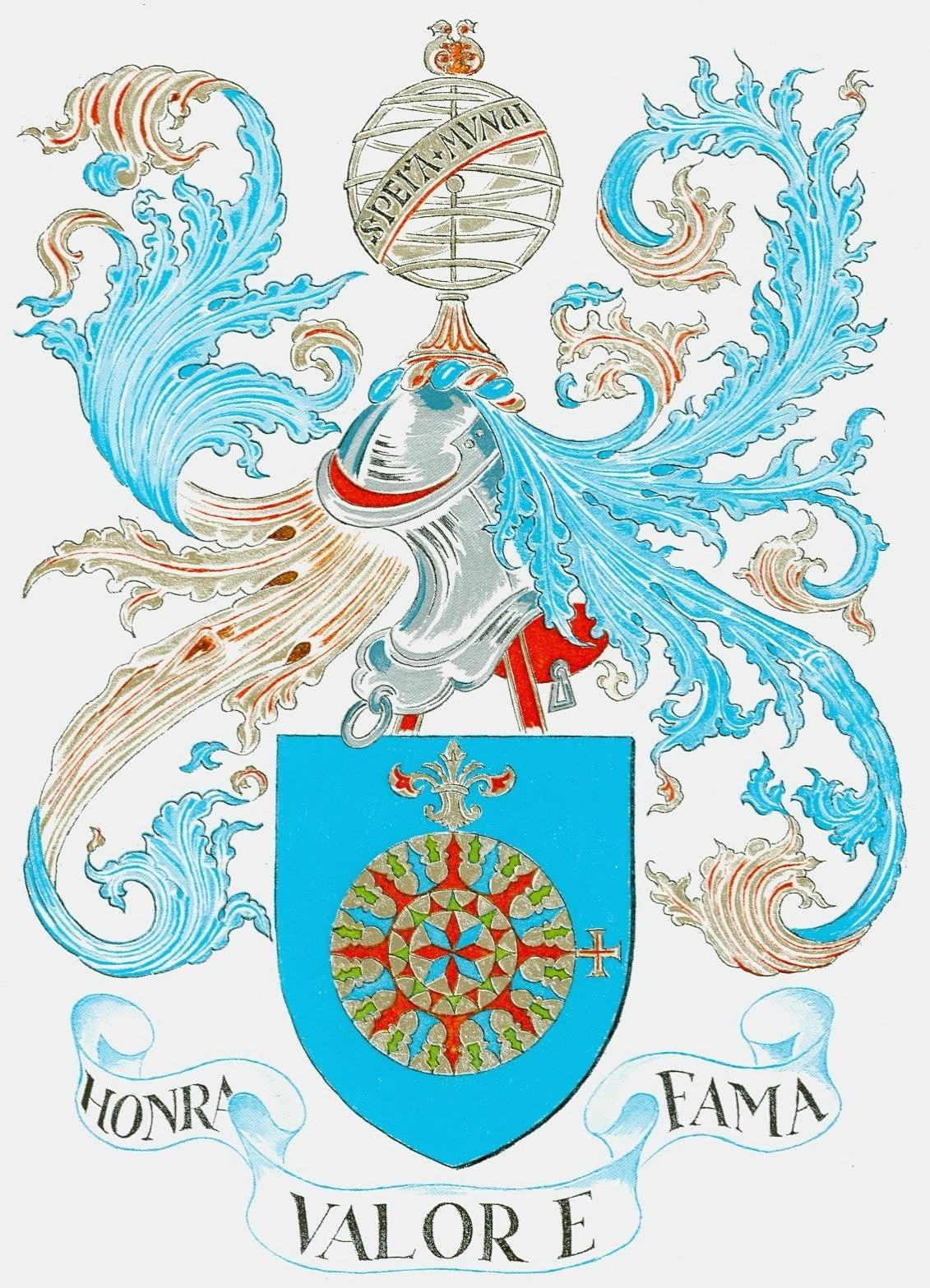
Arms of the Army Center for Geospatial Information.

Coat of arms of the Army's Intervention Brigade.

The present regulation of Army heraldry was established in 1987, replacing the regulation of 1969. The new regulation marked a deep change in the Army heraldic vexillology, that incidentally became substantially different from the vexillology of the other branches of the Armed Forces that continued to be based on the Army's 1969 standards. However, it did not cause substantial changes in the standards of the coat of arms.

The coat of arms of the Army is gules, a lion rampant or holding an ancient sword argent with a handle or, the crest of the achievement being the figure of the shield. The badge of the Army is this coat of arms, but represented in a round shield surrounded by a laurel wreath in dexter and oak wreath in sinister, topped by the Army's coronet, with or without the crest. The Army's coronet is a mural crown with eight towers, five of them apparent, interspersed by cannonballs.

Each independent body of the Army has the right to bear a coat of arms and a flag to be flown. The coat of arms is represented in a heater shield (referred to as "classical shield"). The field is blazoned accordingly with the general rules of Portuguese heraldry, but mottoes, legends and monograms are not allowed inside the shield, and partitions of the field are only allowed without any charges on them.

The complete achievement of arms of a body is represented by the shield, helmet, torse, mantling and crest, scroll with motto and, optionally orders, supporters, compartment and a war cry. Alternatively, the achievement can be represented by the shield topped by the Army's coronet and optionally the crest on its top, without any other elements including the helmet.

The previous 1969 Army heraldic regulations also envisioned the existence of personal coats of arms for certain general officers. These included rank or office insignia to be put under or on the sides of the shield. Examples of those insignia were two crossed batons under the shield for marshals, two crossed cannon under the shield for the director of the artillery branch, two towers in the dexter and sinister of the shield for the director of the engineering branch, a Greek cross under the shield for the director of the military health service and a collar with flaming grenades and cog-wheels around the shield for the director of the ordnance service. However, the present regulations include only achievements of arms for bodies.

The heraldic flags used by the bodies of the Army are the flags to be flown, the standards (estandartes) and the pennants (flâmulas). The standards of the independent bodies are square (75 cm × 75 cm), being a quadrature of the respective coat of arms. The flags to be flown are similar, but their dimensions can vary. The standards of the sub-units of battalion size have the center of the field occupied by the quadrature of its mother unit coat of arms, with a bordure of the main metal of the arms, with the angles occupied by a color or fur which identifies the order of the sub-unit inside the unit. It is notable that while the battalion flags were traditionally referred as "guidons" (guiões), this new designation implemented in 1987 broke with that tradition. The company size sub-units bear a pennant (75 cm × 25 cm forked flag) with a quadrature of its mother battalion near the host and the tips with a specific color that identifies the company inside the battalion. Independent companies bear battalion type standards and not pennants.

The Portuguese Army has its own heraldic authority, the Directorate of Military History and Culture, through its Section of Heraldry.

=== Navy heraldry ===
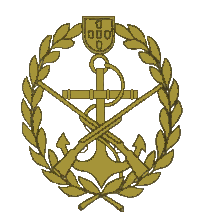
Emblem of the Portuguese Marine Corps.

Portuguese Naval heraldry is regulated by the Office of Naval Heraldry, under the 2010 Regulation of the Heraldry of the Navy, that replaced the previous Regulation of 1972.

The coat of arms of the Navy is a field azur with a dolphin argent, a naval crown or, a scroll with the war cry São Jorge (Saint George) on the top and a scroll with the motto Talant de bien faire (Talent to make good) on the bottom. This coat of arms, including its external elements, but represented in a round shield flanked by a laurel wreath in dexter and an oak laurel in sinister, constitutes the badge of the Navy.

Besides the Navy itself, the following bodies have the right to bear coats of arms: the Naval Command and the maritime zone commands, the bodies that are part of the Naval Command that are headed by commanders or officers of higher rank, the bodies of the National Maritime Authority, the Hydrographic Institute, the frigates, corvettes, submarines, training ships and other naval units commanded by commanders or officers of higher rank, permanent naval forces and groups, other bodies headed by captains or officers of higher rank, the Naval Staff and the Naval Band. When authorized by the Chief of Staff of the Navy, a coat of arms can be granted to non-permanent naval or marine force commanded by a commander or officer of higher rank. Flag officers with the role of commanders, directors or chiefs of the aforementioned bodies also have the right to bear achievements of arms. The small naval units not included in the aforementioned ones usually bear an heraldic device that serves as badge and as main charge of their heraldic pennants.

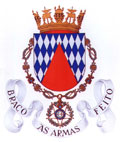
Coat of arms of the Portuguese Marine Corps.

The achievements of arms used in the Navy usually consist of a shield topped by a naval crown. They can also include crosses and collars of orders, decorations with their ribbons, trophies, mottos and war cries. The achievements may also include supporters and their compartments. The achievements of arms of the flag officers consist of the shield of the body under his/her command, with the rank insignia of the bearer under the shield and with the naval crown replaced by helm, torse and crest. The shields are of the round-bottom shape, but round shields flanked by laurels can also be used to constitute badges. The Navy's heraldry allows the augmentation of honors to the achievements of arms. The possible marks of augmentation are based in the ancient Portuguese usage of royal augmentation with elements of the coat of arms of Portugal and are a canton charged with a castle or, a canton charged with a quina or an escutcheon argent with the five quinas.

Naval flag officers have specific heraldic rank insignia to be inserted under the shields of their achievements of arms. These are two anchors argent in saltire each charged with two quinas for admirals, the same anchors but without the quinas for vice-admirals, a single anchor argent per pale for rear-admirals and the same anchor but with a reduced canton in the shield charged with an anchor argent for commodores.

The Portuguese Navy has the custom of granting coats of arms to ships with the blazoning of the family or personal coat of arms of their patrons. Example are the shields of the three Vasco da Gama-class frigates (Vasco da Gama, Álvares Cabral and Corte Real), which fields have the identical blazoning of the coats of arms borne, respectively, by Vasco da Gama, by Pedro Álvares Cabral and by the brothers Miguel and Gaspar Corte-Real.

The Navy also uses heraldic flags that are based in the Army's 1969 standards and so are considerably different from those used today by that branch of service. These flags are the heraldic standards (estandartes heráldicos), the guidons (guiões) and the heraldic pennants (flâmulas heráldicas). The heraldic standards are square flags (1 m × 1 m), whose fields may be blazoned with a combination of ordinaries, crosses, stars or stripes, with an optional cross or saltire overall, the fields having in the center the shield of the bearers surrounded by a scroll with their designation. The guidons are also square flags (0.8 m × 0.8 m), the field charged with the heraldic badges of the bearers, with a bordure that can be simple, gyronny, quartered or cantoned. The heraldic pennants - not to be confused with the commissioning pennants - are triangular flags (0.75 m × 0.25 m), divided in four parts by a scroll in bend with the name of the bearers and charged with their heraldic badges. Heraldic standards are borne by the Navy itself, the Naval Command and the maritime zone commands, the Marine Corps and the naval and marine forces and units entitled to bear coats of arms, the marine battalions, the Naval School, the Naval Technologies, Maritime Authority and Marines schools and the Naval and Marine bases. Guidons are borne by independent Marine companies and divers units. Heraldic pennants are borne by small naval units not entitled to bear heraldic standards and by Marine companies that are part of battalions.

=== Air Force's heraldry ===
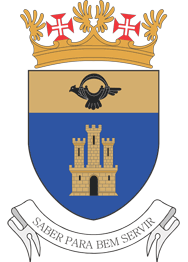
Coat of arms of Air Force Base Nº 1 in Sintra.

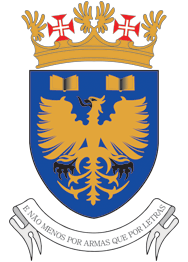
Arms of the Portuguese Air Force Academy.

Roundel of the air force.

The heraldry of the Portuguese Air Force was officially regulated in 1985, being largely based on the Army's 1969 heraldic standards. The 1985 Regulation of Heraldry is an update of the transitional standards approved in 1978 and replaced the previous Air Force's flag regulation of 1960, which also defined the mainly non-heraldic shields used by each unit.

The coat of arms of the Air Force itself is field azur with a spread eagle or beaked and membered gules, an aeronautical coronet and under the shield a scroll with the motto Ex mero motu (from the mere motion). The aeronautical or Air Force's coronet is a variation on an astral crown, in which the pairs of wings alternate with crosses of Christ (traditional emblem of Portuguese military aviation). The achievement of arms of the Air Force can also be represented in the form of greater arms, with the addition of the following external elements: crest (a wing Or charged with a cross of Christ), torse (Azure and Or), supporters (a lion Gules holding the banner of arms of the Armed Forces General Staff in dexter and a dolphin Sable holding the banner of arms the Air Force in sinister) and compartment (mountains Vert in dexter and water waves Vert in sinister).

Besides the Air Force itself, the following existing bodies have the right to bear coats of arms: base units, technical departments, commands, the Air Force Academy, the Inspection General of the Air Force and the Air Force Staff. The commanding officers of the base units and technical departments with a rank of colonel or above have also the right to bear a coat of arms. Exceptionally and if authorized by the Chief of Staff of the Air Force, coats of arms can also be granted to other bodies not listed above whose commanding officers have the rank of major or above.

The coats of arms of the bodies are usually represented in a heater shield with an aeronautical coronet, with or without the crest. Additional external elements can also be represented. The coats of arms can form a badge, for this use being represented in a round shield surrounded by a laurel wreath in dexter and an oak wreath in sinister, topped by the aeronautical coronet and the crest.

The personal achievements of arms of commanding officers of the bodies are the coats of arms of the respective bodies, but with the aeronautical coronet replaced by a helmet with torse and mantling. These coats of arms can also include the crest and other external elements.

The heraldic flags used by the Air Force are the distinctive flags (galhardetes), the standards (estandartes), the merit guidons (guiões de mérito), the guidons (guiões) and the pennants (flâmulas). The distinctive flags are borne by the general officers and usually are a quadrature of the coat of arms of the body they command. The standards are square banners (1 m × 1 m) with a field resulting from a geometric combination of quarterlies and gyronnies, over which a cross or a saltire may lap up, with the shield of the body in the center, surrounded by a scroll bearing either its designation or motto. The standard of the Air Force itself is its banner of arms. The guidon of merit is a square flag (0.75 m × 0.75 m) with the field Azure with an eagle displayed Or, a bordure Or with a palm Vert in each flank. The guidon is a square flag (0.75 m × 0.75 m) with a quadrature of the coat of arms of the bearer, with a bordure that can be simple, with cantons, quarterly or gyronny. The pennant is a triangular flag (0.25 m × 0.5 m) containing the symbology of the unit. The standards are intended to be borne by the base units, commands, the Air Force Academy and the Air Force; the guidons are by groups; and the pennants by squadrons and independent flights. The merit guidons are to be borne by flights, squadrons and groups distinguished, with the golden medal of distinguished services or above decorations, for exceptional merit in a combat action, including the name of the unit and the date when that action occurred.

The Air Force heraldic authority is the Historical Archive of the Air Force, which includes a deputy chief for heraldry.

=== Unified bodies' heraldry ===
Personal ensign of the Minister of National Defense.

The heraldry of the General Staff of the Armed Forces (EMGFA) was established in 1977, based on the 1969 heraldic rules of the Army and the 1972 rules of the Navy. The achievement of arms of the EMGFA was established as Azure, a winged sea lion Or handling an ancient sword Argent, a coronet with five apparent cannonballs or, the winged sea lion of the shield issuing as crest and a scroll with the motto Que quem quis sempre pôde (That anyone who wanted always could). The coat of arms was represented in a round bottom shield. The coat of arms of the Chief of the General Staff consisted of the shield of the EMGFA with the coronet replaced by a helm and the crest of the EMGFA. A coat of arms of Vice-Chief of the General Staff was also established, being the field of the shield of the EMGFA with a bordure Argent, topped by a helm and the crest of the EMGFA, this defaced by a roundel Gules. The distinctive flags (galhardetes) of the Chief and Vice-Chief of Staff were their respective banners of arms. The standard (estandarte) of the EMGFA followed the 1969 model of the Army units' heraldic standards with a quarterly field of Azure and Argent and a countercharged bordure of Gules and Or, a reduced cross Or overall and the shield of the EMGFA on the center surrounded by a scroll with the designation of the body.

The heraldry of some of the unified bodies of the Armed Forces that were under the direct authority of the EMGFA followed the same model, including the use of the special coronet of the EMGFA. These are the operational commands of the Azores, Madeira, and the Hospital of the Armed Forces.

In 1979, a coat of arms was also established for the Minister of National Defense. The shield was the reproduction of a quina (Azure, five plates in saltire), an helm, torse and mantling Azure and Argent, with an issuing wyvern Argent as crest, a scroll with the motto Os Portugueses somos do Ocidente (We Portuguese are of the West).

Heraldry for several other bodies of the Ministry of National Defense has been created, but not following a specific standard besides the general standards of the Portuguese heraldry.

=== GNR's heraldry ===
Arms of the Republican National Guard (GNR).

The Republican National Guard (GNR) is a gendarmerie type security force, whose members have military status. The GNR started to implement a system of heraldry in the 1970s, following closely the model of the Army's heraldry. The standards used until 1987 were based in the Army's heraldic regulations of 1969. When the Army changed its regulations in 1987, the GNR kept the heraldry of the already existing bodies, but the heraldry of the newly created bodies started to follow the Army's new regulations. Finally, in 2009, the GNR implemented a new heraldic regulation for general application, which is based in the Army's 1987 regulation.

The coat of arms of the GNR is field Vert, an ancient sword Or sustained by two wyverns combatant Or, military helmet Argent, torse and mantling Vert and Or, a wyvern of the shield wielding an ancient sword Or as crest, the collar of the Order of the Tower and Sword and a scroll with the motto Pela Lei e pela Grei (For the Law and for the People). This coat of arms was granted in 1973 and replaced a non-heraldic design used since the 1950s.

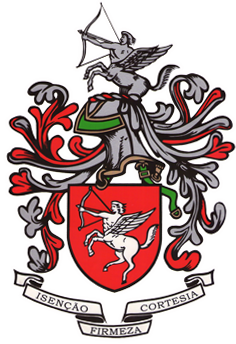
Coat of arms of the GNR Transit Brigade.

Besides the GNR itself, the following bodies have the right to bear a coat of arms: the Command General, the Guard Inspection, the Operational Command, the Human Resources Administration Command, the Training and Doctrine Command, the School of the Guard and the units. Units and sub-units deployed outside of the national territory of Portugal have also the right to bear a coat of arms.

The coats of arms of the above bodies follow exactly the model of the coat of arms of the GNR, being always represented with a heater style shield.

The heraldic flag types used in the GNR are the flag to be flown (bandeira de arvorar), the standard (estandarte), the guidon (guião), the pennant (flâmula) for sub-units, the pennant for vessels and the distinctive flag (galhardete). The flags, the standards, the guidons and the pennants for sub-units follow the model of the Army's respective flags, standards for independent bodies, standards for battalions and pennants. The GNR's own standard is larger, 1 m × 1 m. The pennants for vessels are triangular flags and include near the staff the heraldic symbol of the Coastal Control Unit, and near the fly the symbol of the vessel. The distinctive flags to be borne by general officers are the quadrature of the field of the coat of arms of the bodies they command, with a chief Vert charged with a number of stars Or corresponding to the rank of the general. The flags are to be borne by the bodies entitled to bear a coat of arms, the guidons by battalion-size units, and the pennants by company-size units and by vessels under the command of officers.

The former Fiscal Guard (GF) also made use of heraldry before its integration into the GNR in 1993. The coat of arms of the GF was established in 1980 as Azure with a star of 16 points or (this star was the traditional badge of this body since the 19th century), a helm Argent, torse and mantling Azure and Or, the crest being an issuing griffon or holding a bugle Or, a scroll with the motto Pela Pátria e pela Lei (For the Motherland and for the Law). In 1989, particular coats of arms were also granted to the several units and commands of this body, following the same general standard. With the integration of the GF in the GNR as its Fiscal Brigade, the coat of arms of the previous body became the coat of arms of its successor.

=== Other security forces and services ===
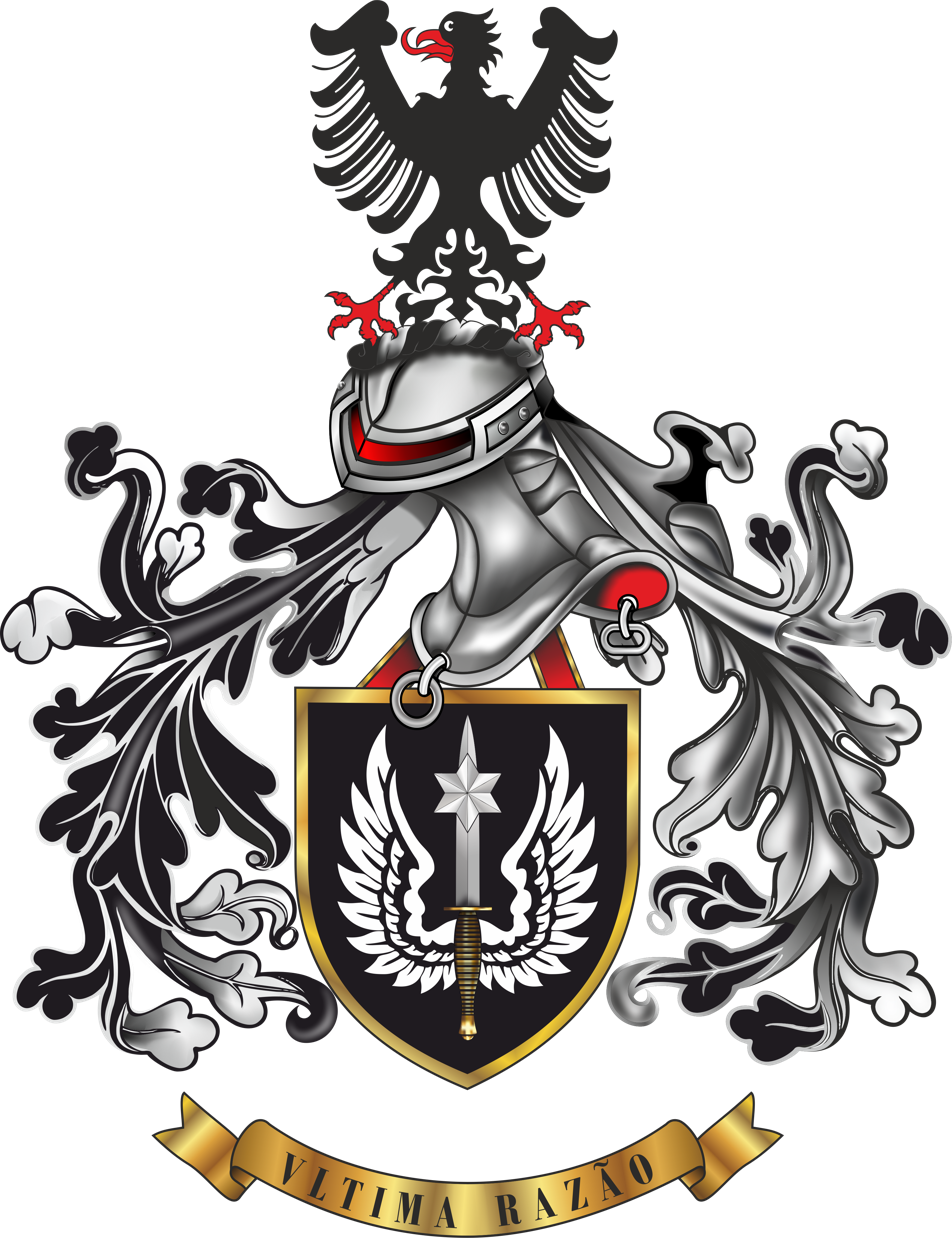
Arms of Public Security Police (PSP)'s Special Operations.

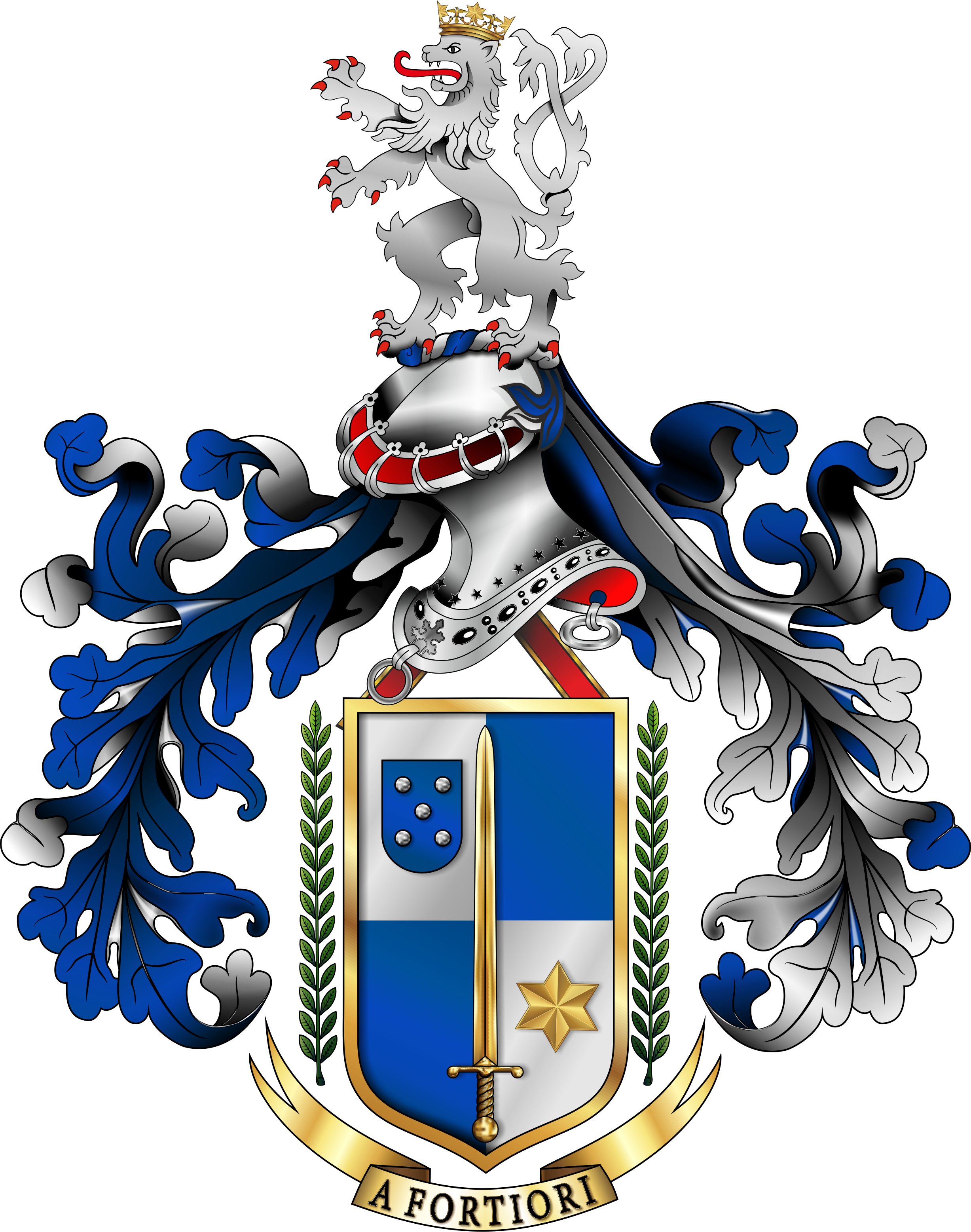
Arms of the Public Security Police (PSP)'s Intervention Corps.

Besides the National Republican Guard and the former Fiscal Guard, other Portuguese security forces and services make use of military type heraldry, despite most of these having a civil nature.

The coat of arms of the Public Security Police (PSP) was approved in 1982. It was Azure with a star of six points Argent, a helm Argent, torse and mantling Azure and Argent, a flying falcon Argent for a crest, the collar of the Order of the Tower and Sword and a scroll with the motto Pela Ordem e pela Pátria (For the Order and for the Motherland). In the same year, the PSP Command initiated a process of creation of coat of arms for the several units and commands of the body, with the support of Colonel Jorge Guerreiro, head of the Army's Heraldic Office. Col. Guerreiro designed a specific PSP coronet, consisting of a ring topped by four stars of six points (three visible) with displayed falcons in their intervals, all in Or. The achievements of arms of most of the units (including of all territorial commands) were then represented as a heater shield topped by the PSP coronet and a scroll with a motto under the shield. However, the heraldic standardization was not universal as, besides the PSP's own coat of arms, the coats of arms created for a number of units did not follow the PSP heraldic standards.

The Portuguese intelligence system (SIRP) and its constituent services also make use of coats of arms. That of the Secretary General of the SIRP was established in 2007 as being a shield Sable with a wall with three doors Argent, accompanied by two lamps in the chief and an armillary sphere in the base all Or, a helm Argent, the crest being a phoenix Argent crowned Or issuing from flames Gules, a scroll with the motto E com força e saber, que mais importa (And with strength and knowing, what matters most). The coat of arms of the Internal Security Intelligence Service (SIS) is Sable, an eagle head Argent beaked Or, a bordure Or with eight castles Sable, an ancient crown Or, a scroll with the motto Principiis Obstare (To hold the front line). The coat of arms of the external intelligence service (SIED) is Gules, an armillary sphere Or, a helm Argent, the crest an owl Or and a scroll with the motto Adivinhar Perigos, e Evitallos (To foresee dangers and avoid them). The achievements of arms of the three bodies are represented with round bottom shields.

A heraldic emblem was granted to the Border and Immigration Police (SEF) in 1989. This is a shield Azure with an armillary sphere Or, helm Argent, torse and mantling Azure and Or, the crest a flying swallow proper, a scroll with the motto Sub Lege, Libertas (Under the law, freedom).

The Economic and Food Security Authority (ASAE) also wished to have a heraldic insignia. The entity adopted a coat of arms in 2012, although the adopted design does not comply with the rules of heraldry. It includes a round bottom shield with a dancetty field with the logo of the ASAE, two crossed halberds over the shield, two griffons on top the shield, a scroll with the motto Pro Lege (For the Law) and the coat of arms of Portugal under the achievement, all involved by laurel wreaths.

== Portuguese Empire ==
Coat of arms of Portugal and its colonies at the headquarters of the Banco Nacional Ultramarino.

Heraldry accompanied the Portuguese overseas expansion since the early 15th century, reaching Africa, Asia and America. The heyday of Portuguese heraldry coincided with the height of the Portuguese Empire in the 16th century.

The Portuguese monarchs granted probably the first achievements of arms to be borne by sub-Saharan Africans: namely, coats of arms were granted to Prince Bemoym (Buumi Jelen) of Jolof, to King Afonso I of Congo and to Emperor Mwenemutapa of Mutapa.

In the main cities and towns of the Portuguese Overseas, local municipal councils were established according to the model that already existed in European Portugal. As their European counterparts did, many of these municipal councils also adopted their own heraldic insignia.

The Portuguese practice was the universal use of the royal coat of arms through all the Portuguese Empire and not to create particular coats of arms for the dominions, even to those to which the status of state was granted (Portuguese India, and later Brazil). Besides the coat of arms of Portugal, other national heraldic insignia were used, these being especially the cross of the Order of Christ and the armillary sphere. From the reign of Manuel I onward, this last device was so much used in the Overseas that it came to be considered as a kind of semi-official symbol of the Portuguese Empire.

The first official grant of coat of arms to a Portuguese overseas territory was made to Brazil in 1815, when it was elevated to the status of a constituent kingdom of the then created United Kingdom of Portugal, Brazil and the Algarves. The coat of arms of the Kingdom of Brazil became field azure with an armillary sphere or. The armillary sphere (often displayed over a cross of the Order of Christ) had been already used as a badge of the Portuguese State of Brazil since the 17th century and, from 1822, continued to be present in the coat of arms of the Empire of Brazil. After the establishment of the republic in 1889, the armillary sphere was altered and transformed in the celestial sphere of the present Brazilian national flag and coat of arms.

Coats of arms of the Portuguese overseas provinces (1935 models, as modified in 1951)
Shield								
Full achievement								
Province	Angola	Cabo Verde	Guinea	India	Macau	Mozambique	São Tomé and Príncipe	Timor

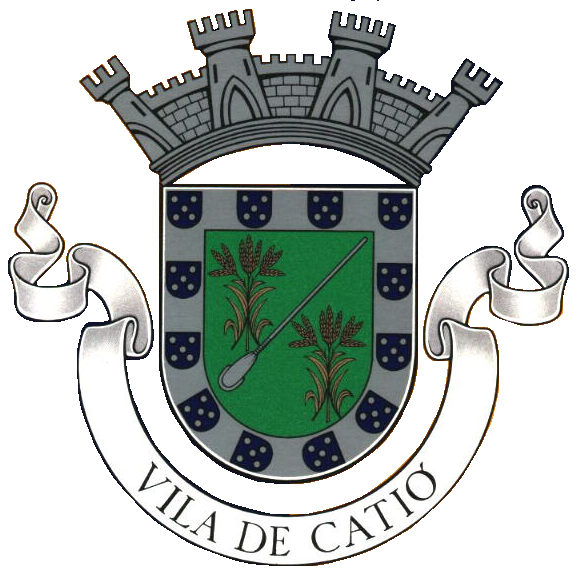
Coat of arms of the town of Catió, Portuguese Guinea.

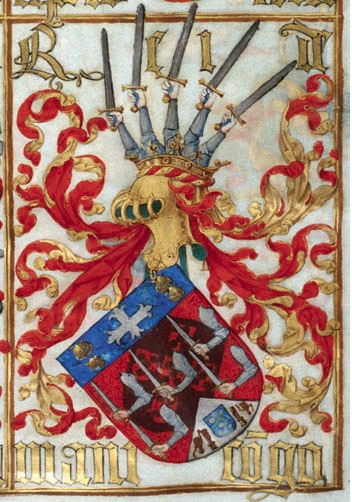
Coat of arms granted by King Manuel I of Portugal to King Afonso I of Kongo, 1528.

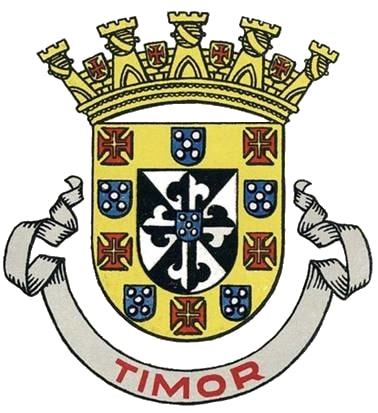
Provisional semi-official coat of arms of the Portuguese Timor, accordingly with the model proposed by the Portuguese Institute of Heraldry in 1932.

After the independence of Brazil in 1822, a Brazilian heraldry appeared, which continued the Portuguese tradition in most of its aspects. Regarding family heraldry, as most of the noble families of Brazil descended from Portuguese lineages, in many cases they continued to bear their coats of arms. The Portuguese tradition of civic heraldry was also partially followed in Brazil. In the 20th century, the Portuguese municipal heraldry official standards established in 1930 served as the model for the municipal heraldry of Brazil. Many Brazilian municipalities created new coats of arms or adapted their old ones to such standards.

Former coat of arms of the East Timorese capital, Dili

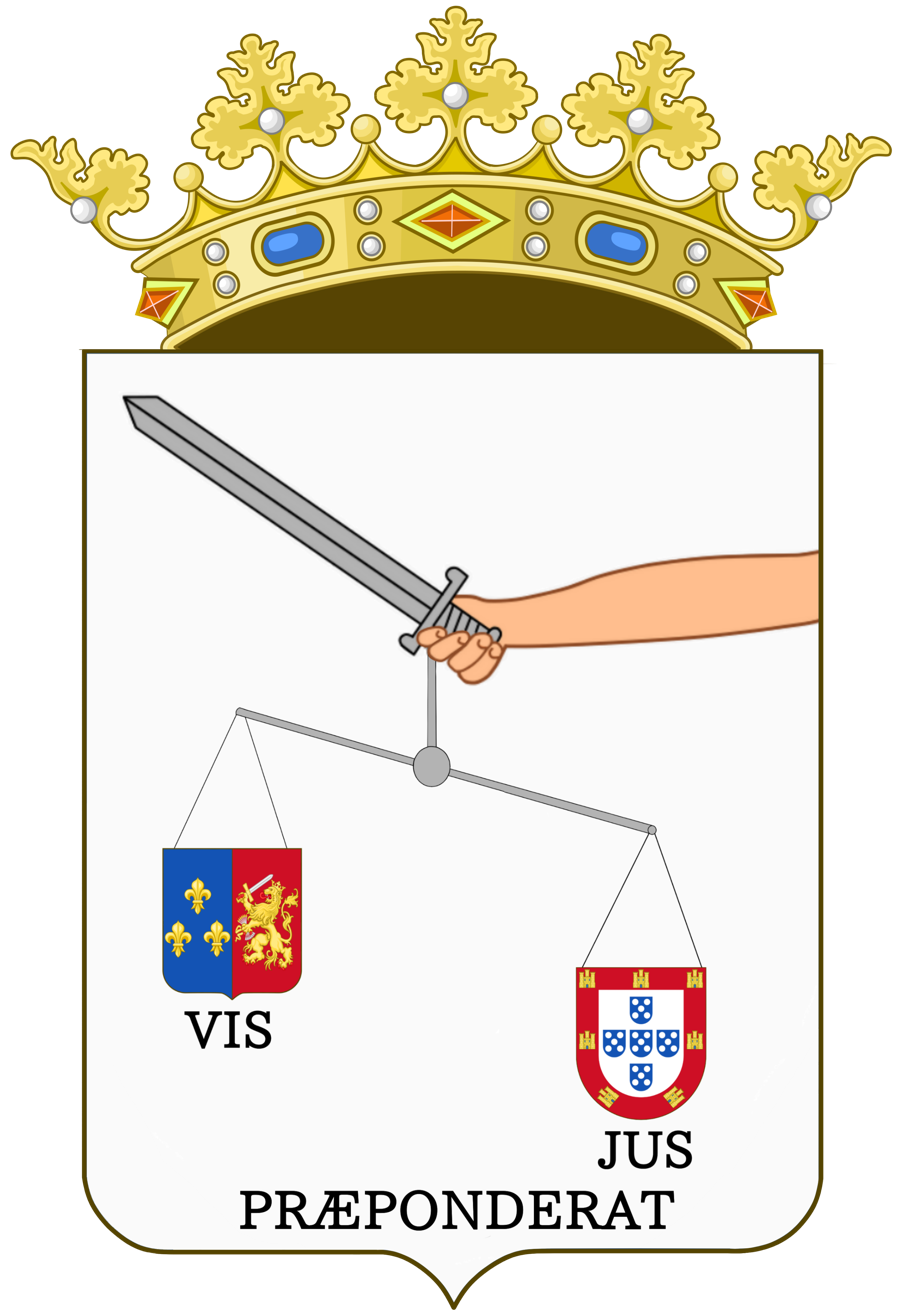
Arms of São Luiz adopted in 1674

In the remaining parts of the Portuguese Empire, the official grant of civic coats of arms only started in the late 19th century, when a number of municipal achievements of arms were granted to several cities of the Overseas by the Portuguese Crown. These granted coats of arms joined municipal coats of arms that had been assumed earlier by other Overseas municipalities.

In 1932, the Portuguese Institute of Heraldry proposed a model of coats of arms to be borne by the Portuguese colonies. Each coat of arms would have a field with the particular heraldic achievement of each colony and a common bordure or charged with four quinas alternating with four crosses of the Order of Christ. The shield was to be topped by a specific model of mural crown with five visible towers or, each tower charged with an armillary sphere gules and between each tower a shield argent charged with the cross of the Order of Christ. Particular heraldic achievements for each colony were also designed to be inserted in the fields of the respective coats of arms. Although this model was never officially adopted, it was apparently in limited use by some colonies.

Finally in 1935, the Ministry of Colonies granted official coats of arms to all of the then Portuguese colonies. All these coats of arms followed the same model: a shield tierced in mantle, the I field argent with the five quinas of Portugal (Portugal ancient), the II with the particular heraldic achievement of the colony and the III field wavy in vert and argent. The shield was placed over an armillary sphere or, topped by a colonial mural crown of the same design as was proposed in 1932 and under it a scroll argent with the name of the colony. As a kind of lesser arms, the achievement was occasionally represented with only the shield topped with the crown. Some of the designs for the particular heraldic achievements proposed for the colonies in 1932 were also used in this model of coats of arms, being placed in the II division of the field of the shields. The coats of arms had a small adjustment in 1951, when the status of the overseas territories reverted from that of "colonies" to "overseas provinces", this being reflected in the inscriptions of the scrolls with the name of those territories.

In the late 1950s, the Portuguese Government started a policy of general granting of coats of arms to the municipalities of the Overseas, most of which - especially the newly created ones - did not yet have them. These new coats of arms followed the 1930 standards established for the heraldry of the municipalities of European Portugal. However, as the municipalities of the Overseas were not under the authority of the Ministry of the Interior and its rules, instead being under the Ministry of the Overseas, some different approaches were made. Instead of resorting to the Heraldry Section of the Association of Portuguese Archeologists, the Ministry of the Overseas asked the Office of Corporative Heraldry, headed by F.P. Almeida Langhams, to design the new municipal coats of arms. Besides introducing its own style, Almeida Langhams ignored some of the restrictions imposed by the 1930 standards of municipal heraldry. So some coats of arms were made with divisions of the field and, in others, a motto replaced the designation of the municipality in the scroll under the shield. Most of the rest of the standards were followed, including the use of the round bottom shield and the mural crowns with a number of towers identifying the rank of the municipal seat. The coats of arms granted to the capital cities of the several Overseas provinces included mural crowns of five visible towers or like the model until then only used by Lisbon as capital of the Nation.

== Ecclesiastical heraldry ==
Arms of Manuel Gonçalves Cerejeira, Patriarch of Lisbon; the Patriarch of Lisbon is the only person besides the Pope himself that can bear the Papal tiara in his arms.

Arms of Cardinal-King Henry I of Portugal.

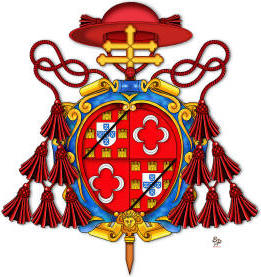
Arms of Cardinal D. Luís de Sousa.

The members of the Portuguese Catholic Church have made use of heraldry since it was first introduced in Portugal. One of the first known ecclesiastical heraldic insignia appears in the seal of Soeiro Mendes, the first bishop of Évora after its reconquest from the Moors in 1165.

Portuguese ecclesiastical heraldry follows the general standards established for the heraldry of the Roman Catholic Church. However, some national features stand out.

One such feature is that the Patriarchate of Lisbon is the only Catholic see - besides the Holy See itself - that has the right to bear the Papal tiara in its achievement of arms. The coat of arms of the Patriarchate of Lisbon differs from that of the Holy See only in combining the tiara with a processional cross crossed with a pastoral staff, while the Holy See combines the crossed keys of Saint Peter. The Patriarchs themselves have the right to bear the Papal tiara in their personal coat of arms; however this has fallen into disuse, with the latter holders of the office (who, by tradition, are always made cardinals) preferring the use of the red ecclesiastical hat (galero) of cardinal.

Another feature is that the Portuguese bishops and archbishops often don't use the standard entirely green ecclesiastical hat, but use instead a Portuguese specific model that is black with the facing and tassels in green. With fifteen tassels, the black and green galero may also be used in the coats of arms of the Primates of Braga and of the Patriarchs of Lisbon if they are not cardinals.

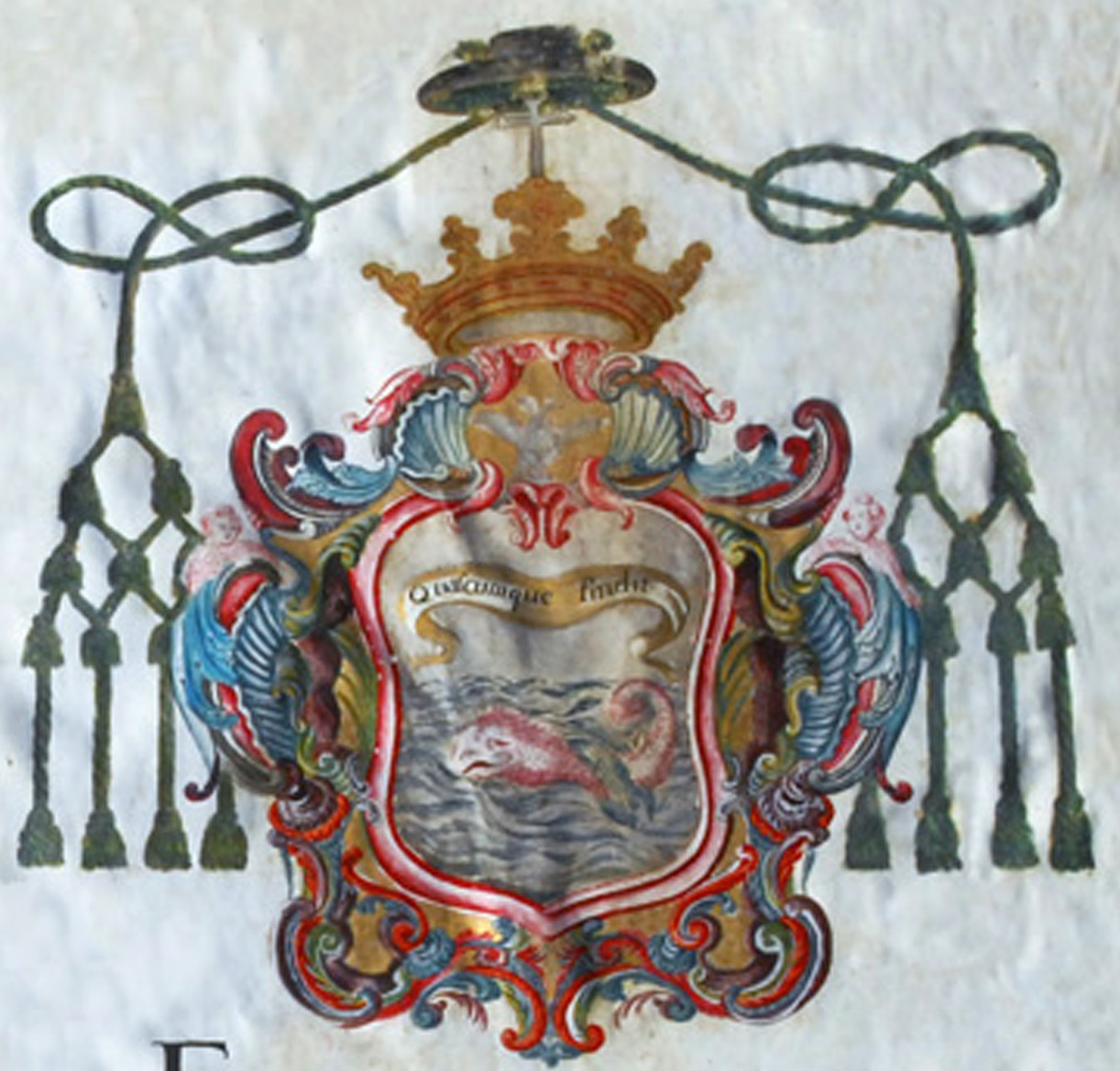
Arms of Miguel de Távora, Archbishop of Évora; 1745.

Ecclesiastical coats of arms are often represented in oval shields. However, the use of round-bottom ("Portuguese shield"), heater and other shapes of shield is also common.

In the past, most ecclesiastical coats of arms consisted of family coats of arms, often representing the lineages from which the holder descended. This reflected the noble origin of most of the high-ranking officials of the Portuguese Church. As there were few legal restrictions regarding the ecclesiastical coat of arms, many officials of the Church bore arms that they were not supposed to be entitled to bear, e.g., the undefaced family arms, in theory reserved to the heads of lineages. There were also many cases of officials of the Church that adopted the family coat of arms corresponding to their surnames, although not even belonging to that lineage. Other officials of the Church bore instead Arms of Faith (Armas de Fé), with elements that represented their religious devotions and philosophies. These have become more common, as a growing number of non-noble persons ascended to the high ranks of the Church. There were also coats of arms created through the marshaling of Arms of Faith with family arms.

The bishop of Coimbra João Galvão was made count of Arganil, by King Afonso V in 1472. Since then the title has remained associated with the ecclesiastical office, with its holders being known as "bishops-counts". Because of their singular status as holders of both an ecclesiastical and a secular title, the bishops-counts of Coimbra used a coat of arms in which the shield was topped by a count's coronet, and that was topped by a bishop's ecclesiastical hat. Following the ban on the use of noble titles by the members of the Catholic Church, the bishops of Coimbra dropped the use of the title and the use of the respective coronet in their coat of arms.

Another peculiar mixed ecclesiastical and secular coat of arms was that of by the Cardinal-King Henry of Portugal. Being the youngest son of King Manuel I, Henry followed the ecclesiastical life, later becoming a cardinal. When his great nephew King Sebastian died in the battle of Alcácer Quibir in 1578, Henry was the next in the line of succession and became King of Portugal, although maintaining his ecclesiastical standing. As a cardinal and King, Henry bore the Royal Arms of Portugal, with a cardinal hat over the royal crown.

=== Santa Casa da Misericórdia ===
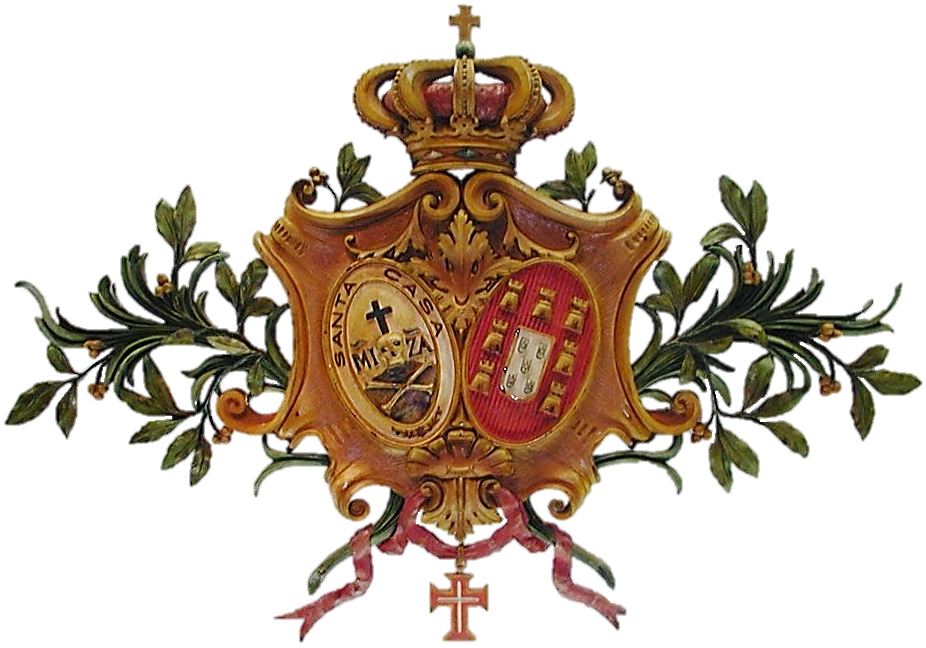
Arms of the Santa Casa da Misericórdia de Lisboa.

Other Portuguese corporations that also make significant use of heraldry are the misericórdias (holy houses of mercy). The traditional achievement of arms used by the misericórdias consisted of two shields represented in courtesy. The sinister shield is usually the coat of arms of Portugal, while the dexter shield is usually the particular coat of arms of the misericórdia itself. This contains heraldic charges representing the attributes of the institution, the most common being: cross (representing God and the support to the sick during their life), skull and crossed bones (representing spiritual comfort given in death), the legend "MIZA" (old abbreviation for misericórdia "mercy"), the allegoric figure of the Mercy, the image of Our Lady and images of Saints. The two shields are usually oval and represented in a cartouche, surrounded by a laurel wreath and frequently topped by the Portuguese royal crown (representing the royal tutelage of the misericórdias since their foundation).

After the implantation of the republic, some misericórdias opted by less "monarchic" achievement, eliminating the royal crown and instead placing the two shields in courtesy over the armillary sphere of the present Portuguese coat of arms. Besides this, many variations occur, like the representation of the arms of the misericórdia and of Portugal in the same shield parti per pale, or the replacement of the arms of Portugal by those of the local municipality. In the early 1930s, the heraldist Afonso Dornelas of the Section of Heraldry of the Association of Portuguese Archeologists proposed a model for the heraldry to be bore by the misericórdias, but this not implemented by most of them. In the 1990s, the heraldist J. Bernard Guedes proposed a new heraldic model that has been accepted and implemented by a number of misericórdias. Accordingly, with this model, the achievement of arms is composed of a round-bottom shield, a Marian crown and a scroll with the designation of the institution. The charges included in this model of coat of arms are more heterogeneous than in the old one, although some of them, such as the shrimping net (heraldic badge of Queen Eleanor, founder of the misericórdias), are frequently repeated. Bernard Guedes also established the model for the heraldic flags, which have a white field with a saltire azur (taken from the crest of the family coat of arms of Friar Miguel Contreiras, the mythical creator of the misericórdias), a bordure in the main color of the coat of arms, with the cantons in the main metal charged with the abbreviation "MIZA" in the I and IV and with diverse charges in the II and III.

== Corporate heraldry ==
Corporate heraldry refers to the coats of arms of the several types of Portuguese corporations, including charitable organizations, labor organizations, educational institutions and others. Corporate heraldry achieved a high development in the scope of the corporative regime of the Estado Novo, in force from 1933 to 1974.

Under the Estado Novo, the labor and economic activities of the Nation were to be framed by corporative bodies or corporations (in a broad sense), including the trade unions, the guilds, the orders of independent professionals, the houses of the fishermen and the houses of people. Under the leadership of the heraldist F. P. Almeida Langhans, the Office of Corporate Heraldry was established as the official heraldic authority for those bodies. Almeida Langhans created a specific model for the coats of arms of corporative bodies that consisted of an oval shield entirely encircled by a cartouche (designed as a scroll) bearing the designation of the body. The charges used in these coats of arms were often the tools used in the crafts that the body represented and the images of the patron Saints of those crafts. An unconventional type of charges, also often included in the field of the shields, were complete achievements of arms (including its external elements), especially those of the municipalities where the corporative bodies were located. The model created for the coats of arms of the corporations (in the narrow sense) that represented the large branches of industry was different and consisted in a heater shield topped by an helmet, torse, mantling and crest.

Arms of the Portuguese professional orders
Order of Lawyers	Order of Engineers	Order of Physicians	Order of Veterinarians

Within the scope of corporate heraldry, Almeida Langhans was also responsible for the creation of a model of coat of arms for the corps of volunteer firefighters. This consisted in the Phoenix issuing from the flames and holding two crossed axes, charged with the municipal coat of arms of the city or town where the corps was located. This model of coat of arms is still today used by almost all the corps of volunteer firefighters of the country.

The use of heraldic insignia was not traditional among Portuguese universities and other educational institutions. As insignia, these usually preferred the use of variants of their seals, usually with allegoric and non-heraldic designs. However, since the 1970s, a number of universities and polytechnic institutes have adopted coats of arms as their insignia.

The 1991 law regulating the Portuguese municipal heraldry also defined a model for the corporate coat of arms to be borne by the legal persons of administrative public interest. These would be represented in a round-bottom shield, with a civic crown and a scroll with the name of the institution; however, this model of coat of arms was apparently never granted to any institution.

== Heraldic authorities ==
=== King of Arms ===
During the period of the Monarchy (until 1910), the heraldic authorities of the Kingdom were the officers of arms and the Nobility Register Office.

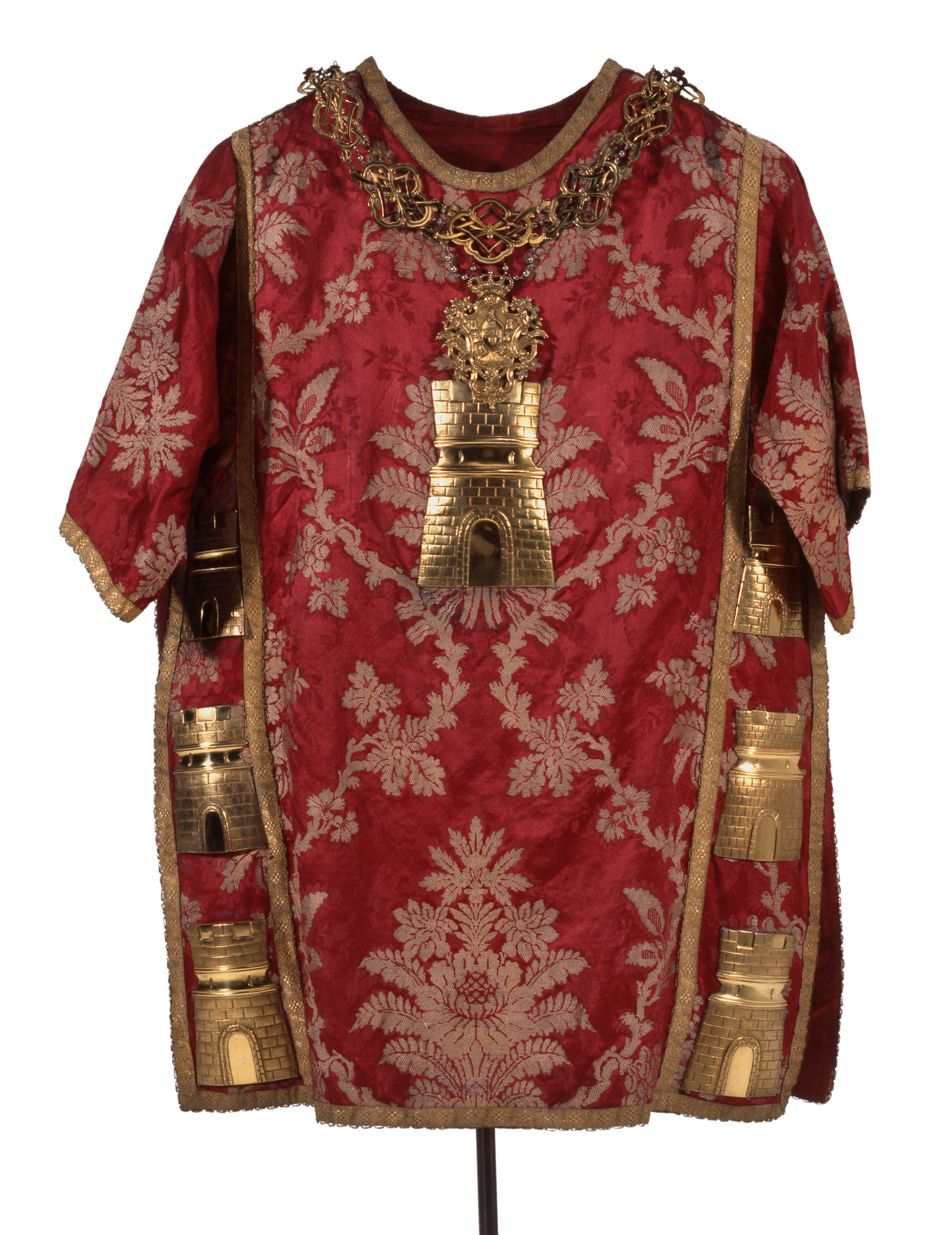
Tabard and collar of a Portuguese King of Arms in the 18th century.

The Portuguese Monarchs had officers of arms at their service since the 14th century or earlier. The first known holder of the office of Portugal King of Arms was probably an Englishman named Harriet, during the reign of John I.

At that time, the granting of arms was not reserved to the Monarch. Several nobles not only assumed their own arms, but also granted arms to their vassals. So besides the Monarchs, several princes and other members of the high nobility also had private officers of arms in their service. This ended in 1476, when King Afonso V decreed that all grants of arms were to be made through the Portugal King of Arms.

The heraldic ordinances of King Manuel I of 1521, not only regulated the heraldry itself, but also strictly regulated the organization of the corporation of officers of arms of the Crown. The corporation was to be headed by a principal king of arms - whose role was to be fulfilled by the already existing Portugal King of Arms - and was to further include additional kings of arms, heralds and pursuivants.

The corporation of the officers of arms came so to include three kings of arms, three heralds and three pursuivants. The kings of arms were named after the three constituent states of the Portuguese Crown (the Kingdom of Portugal, the Kingdom of Algarve and the State of India), the heralds after their respective capital cities and the pursuivants after a notable town of each of the states. So, there were the Portugal King of Arms (Rei de armas Portugal), the Algarve King of Arms (Rei de armas Algarve), the India King of Arms (Rei de armas Índia), the Lisbon Herald (Arauto Lisboa), the Silves Herald (Arauto Silves), the Goa Herald (Arauto Goa), the Santarém Pursuivant (Passavante Santarém), the Lagos Pursuivant (Passavante Lagos) and the Cochin Pursuivant (Passavante Cochim). The Silves Herald was later retitled Tavira Herald (Arauto Tavira), when the capital of Algarve was moved to this city. Also, in the course of the transfer of the Portuguese Court to Brazil, the India King of Arms was retitled America, Africa and Asia King of Arms (Rei de armas América, África e Ásia) in 1808, returning to the original title in 1825.

Besides the officers of arms proper, the heraldic authority of the Crown also included the Scrivener of the Nobility (Escrivão da Nobreza) and the High Armorer (Armeiro-mor). The former headed the Nobility Register Office (Cartório da Nobreza), being responsible for keeping the registers of all the coats of arms of the Kingdom and for the signing of new grants. The High Armorer, besides his main role of maintaining the personal armor and weapons of the King, had the heraldic responsibility of keeping a roll of arms for the King's immediate consultation.

From the late 17th century, associated with the beginning of a period of decadence of heraldry in Portugal, the role of the officers of arms became increasingly merely ceremonial. The offices were often filled by persons with little heraldic knowledge, instead of the highly literate officers of arms in the past. From then until the end of the Monarchy, the responsibility for the heraldic authority function fell mainly on the Scrivener of the Nobility and his Nobility Register Office.

=== Contemporary authorities ===
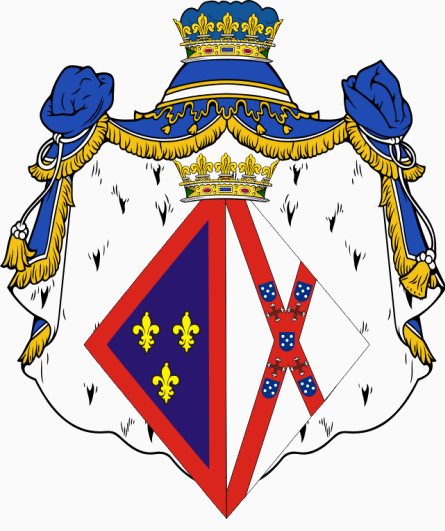
Contemporary arms of Princess Diana of Cadaval, Duchess of Cadaval & Anjou.

With the introduction of the republican regime on the 5 October 1910, the body of officers of arms and the Nobility Register were disbanded. Since then no central heraldic authority has existed in Portugal. However, some sectorial heraldic authorities were later established.

In 1930, the Heraldic Section of the Association of Portuguese Archeologists (AAP) was appointed by the Ministry of Interior as the authority for municipal heraldry. The municipal heraldry law of 1991 anticipated the establishment of a State Office of Municipal Heraldry that would become the authority in these matters. However, as this office was never created, the Heraldic Section of the AAP continued to fulfill that role until today. This section also serves as heraldic adviser for other entities, but with no formal authority.

In the 1940s the Office of Corporate Heraldry was established within the FNAT (the workers' leisure organization during the Corporatist Estado Novo). This office became the authority for corporate heraldry, including the heraldry used by labor groups such as trade unions, guilds, and professional orders. Besides the corporate heraldry, this office was also required by the Ministry of the Overseas to serve as the authority for the Overseas municipalities heraldry. The Office of Corporate Heraldry was disbanded in 1974, following the overthrow of the Estado Novo and the end of Portuguese corporatism.

The Institute of the Portuguese Nobility is the heraldic authority for the personal and family coats of arms of the descendants of the old Portuguese nobility. It was established in 2004 by members of Portugal's titled nobility, with Duarte Pio, Heir to the Portuguese Crown as its honorary president, as a replacement for the previous Council of Nobility. As a private institution with no formal powers granted by the State, it is not an official authority, although its technical know-how and its decisions in these matters have been accepted by the Portuguese courts of Justice and by other official authorities.

There are other private institutions that are frequently required to act as heraldic advisers for public and non-public entities, like the Portuguese Institute of Heraldry and the Portuguese Academy of Heraldry. However, these institutions have no formal heraldic powers.

=== Rolls of arms ===
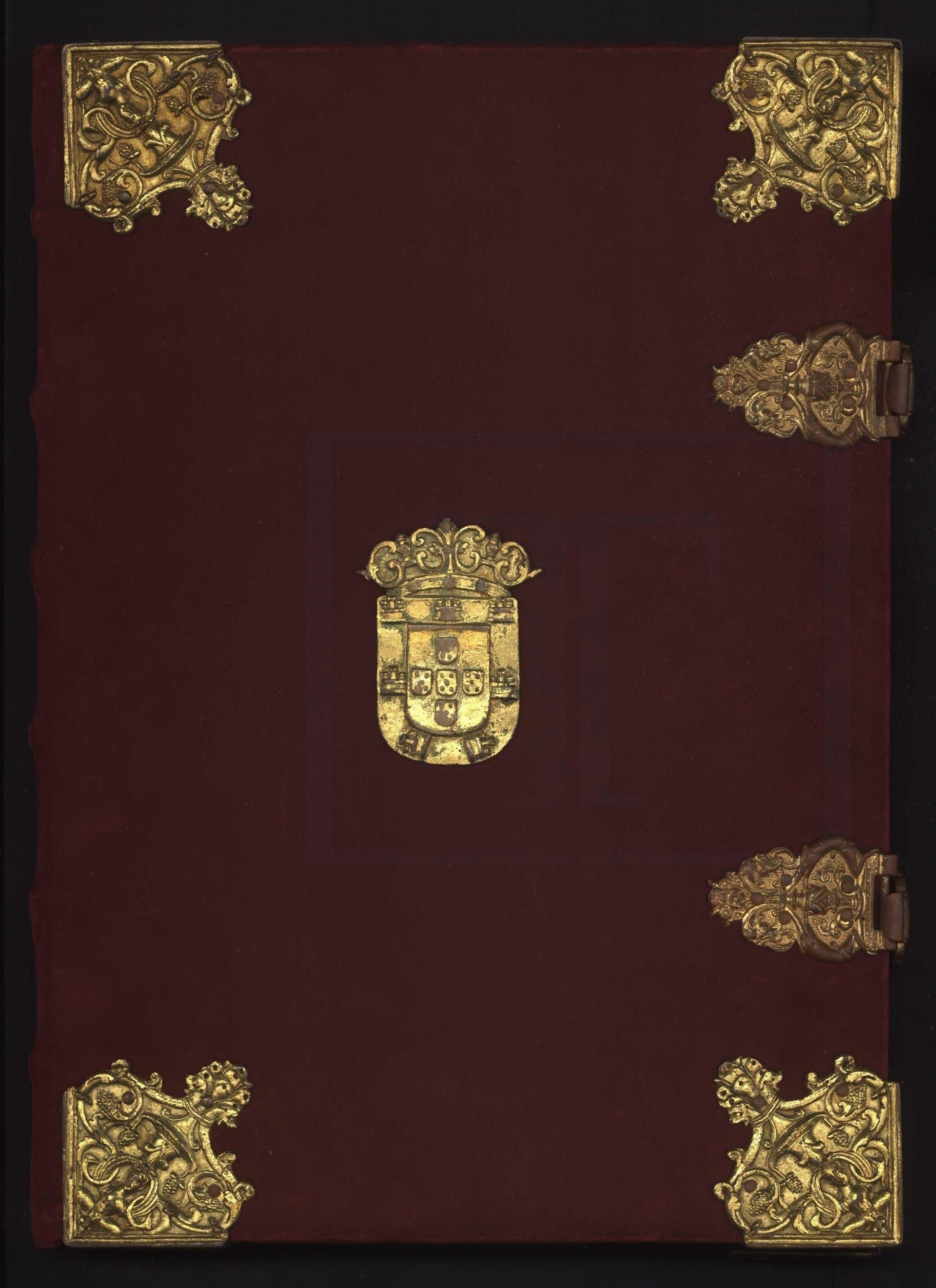
The Livro da Nobreza e Perfeiçam das Armas.

The Portuguese officers of arms and the Nobility Register Office had to maintain official rolls of arms. These rolls took usually the form of illuminated manuscripts that constitute beautiful works of art. Unfortunately, part of these disappeared when the Nobility Register Office was destroyed by the 1755 Lisbon earthquake. Others however survived and still exist.

The most notable still existent Portuguese rolls of arms are:

- Livro do Armeiro-Mor (Book of the King of Arms) - dated from 1509 and created by João do Cró, Portugal King of Arms. It includes the real and imaginary coats of arms of the Nine Worthies, of the states of Europe, Africa and Asia, of the electors of the Holy Roman Emperor, of the peerage of France, of members of the Royal Family of Portugal and of the other noble families of Portugal. It was supposed to be the book kept by the King of Arms near the Monarch to be consulted by him when needed.
- Livro da Nobreza e Perfeiçam das Armas (Book of the Nobility and Perfection of the Arms) - dated from 1521 to 1541 and created by António Godinho, secretary of King John III of Portugal. It follows the model of the Livro do Armeiro-Mor, being its update, but omitting the chapters on the Nine Worthies, the electors of the Emperor and the peers of France.
- Thesouro de Nobreza (Treasure of the Nobility) - dated from 1675 and created by Francisco Coelho, India King of Arms. It includes the real and imaginary arms of the 12 tribes of Israel, the Nine Worthies, the Romans, the peers of France, the electors of the Empire, the cavalry and regular orders of Portugal, some cities of the overseas dominions of Portugal, the cities and principal towns of Portugal, the Kings and Queens of Portugal, the dukes and marquises of Portugal, and the counts of Portugal and their families.

== See also ==
- Coat of arms of Portugal
- Portuguese vexillology
