= Serviço de Informações Estratégicas de Defesa =

Portuguese governmental intelligence agency

Defense Strategic Information Service
- Serviço de Informações Estratégicas de Defesa

Agency overview
- Formed: 2004
- Preceding agency: Serviço de Informações Estratégicas de Defesa e Militares (SIEDM)
- Type: Foreign intelligence service
- Jurisdiction: Portugal
- Headquarters: Lisbon
- Minister responsible: Luís Montenegro, Prime Minister
- Agency executive: Manuel Silva Vieira, Director of the SIED
- Parent agency: Intelligence System of the Portuguese Republic (SIRP)
- Website: www.sied.pt

The Serviço de Informações Estratégicas de Defesa or SIED (Portuguese for: Defense Strategic Information Service) is the foreign strategic intelligence agency of Portugal.

SIED's mission is to produce information aimed at safeguarding the national independence, the national interests and the external security of the Portuguese State.

Together with the SIS (Portugueses domestic intelligence agency), the SIED is a component of the SIRP (Portuguese Intelligence System).

== History ==
The existence of SIED was originally envisaged by the Law of the Information System of the Portuguese Republic in 1984. However, even before being activated, it was merged with the Military Information Service (SIM), originating the SIEDM (Strategic and Military Information Service). This was activated in 1997.

In 2004, the SIEDM lost its military component and was renamed SIED.

== See also ==
- List of intelligence agencies
- Sistema de Informações da República Portuguesa
- PIDE
