= Sistema de Informações da República Portuguesa =

Portuguese intelligence service

Informations System of the Portuguese Republic
- Sistema de Informações da República Portuguesa

Agency overview
- Formed: 1984
- Type: Intelligence service
- Jurisdiction: Portugal
- Headquarters: Lisbon
- Annual budget: €34.687 million (2018)
- Minister responsible: Luís Montenegro, Prime Minister
- Agency executive: Vítor Sereno, Secretary-General of the SIRP
- Child agencies: SIS; SIED
- Website: www.sirp.pt

The Sistema de Informações da República Portuguesa (SIRP, Portuguese for "Informations System of the Portuguese Republic") is the coordinating structure of Portuguese intelligence.

It is the parent body for two separate intelligence agencies: the Serviço de Informações de Segurança (SIS, Security Intelligence Service) for the internal security intelligence and the Serviço de Informações Estratégicas de Defesa (SIED, Defense and Strategic Informations Service) for foreign intelligence.

The SIS and the SIED are the public services responsible for ensuring—within the Constitution and the law—the production of intelligence necessary to safeguard national independence internal security.

== History ==
Logo of the SIED.

During the New State regime and until its end in 1974, the main intelligence agency in Portugal was the PIDE—Polícia Internacional e de Defesa do Estado (International and State Defense Police). Nominally under jurisdiction of the Ministry of the Interior, PIDE was in fact a secret police force controlled directly by Portuguese prime-minister António de Oliveira Salazar. In 1968, under Salazar's successor Marcello Caetano, PIDE was renamed the Direcção Geral de Segurança (DGS, Directorate General of Security) and underwent some reform. Following a coup by the Portuguese military in 1974 the agency was immediately abolished due to the abhorrence felt for the PIDE/DGS as a tool of the authoritarian regime.

Because of the memory of the abuses of the PIDE/DGS in supporting the regime the establishment of a new civilian intelligence agency was delayed for more than a decade. However, following a terrorist attack on the Embassy of Turkey in 1983, the assassination of a Palestine Liberation Organization representative at a Socialist International conference also in 1983, and a number of domestic terrorist attacks, the Portuguese government became convinced of the need for a new intelligence agency. This led to the establishment of SIRP in 1984.

== Organization ==
Logo of the SIS.

The SIRP is under the direct authority of the Prime Minister of Portugal and includes:

- the Supervisory Council of the SIRP (under the authority of the Portuguese Parliament);
- the Data Supervisory Committee of the SIRP (under the authority of the Attorney General of Portugal);
- the Superior Council of Intelligence;
- the Secretary General of the SIRP;
- the SIED;
- the SIS.

The Secretary General—equivalent to a secretary of State and designated by the Prime-Minister—is the head of the SIRP and coordinates the directors of the SIED and the SIS. It is the inspection, supervision and coordination organ of both the intelligence services.

Directly under the Secretary General is the Administrative and Technical Support Office and the four joint departments of the SIRP (Finance and General Support, Security, Human Resources and Information Technology).

== See also ==
- List of intelligence agencies
- Serviços de Informações de Segurança
- PIDE
