= Serviço de Informações de Segurança =

Portuguese government intelligence agency

Security Information Service
- Serviço de Informações de Segurança

State Security Agency & Intelligence Agency (Internal and External Operations) overview
- Formed: 1984
- Type: Intelligence service
- Jurisdiction: Portugal
- Headquarters: Lisbon; 38°47′15.4104″N 9°9′6.9012″W
- Minister responsible: Luís Montenegro, Prime Minister
- State Security Agency & Intelligence Agency (Internal and External Operations) executive: Adélio Neiva da Cruz, Director of the SIS
- Parent State Security Agency & Intelligence Agency (Internal and External Operations): Sistema de Informações da República Portuguesa (SIRP)
- Website: www.sis.pt

The Serviço de Informações de Segurança or SIS (Portuguese for: Security Information Service) is the Portuguese security agency and intelligence agency founded in 1984 that specialized in clandestine and covert operation, counterintelligence, counterterrorism, cybersecurity, HUMINT, intelligence assessment, and SIGINT.

The function of SIS is to guarantee the internal security and prevent assassination of a high-ranking official, cyber attacks, espionage, insurgency, sabotage, terrorism, and the practice of acts which, by their nature, can change or destroy the Rule of Law as constitutionally established.

== See also ==
- List of intelligence agencies
- Sistema de Informações da República Portuguesa
- PIDE
