= Turke, Croatia =

Settlement in Primorje-Gorski Kotar County, Croatia

Turke
- Settlement
- Interactive map of Turke
- Location of Turke in Croatia
- Coordinates: 45°30′55″N 14°45′05″E
- Country: Croatia
- County: Primorje-Gorski Kotar
- City: Delnice

Area
  - Total: 3.4 km^{2} (1.3 sq mi)

Population (2021)
  - Total: 19
  - Density: 5.6/km^{2} (14/sq mi)
- Time zone: UTC+1 (CET)
  - Summer (DST): UTC+2 (CEST)
- Postal code: 51300 Delnice

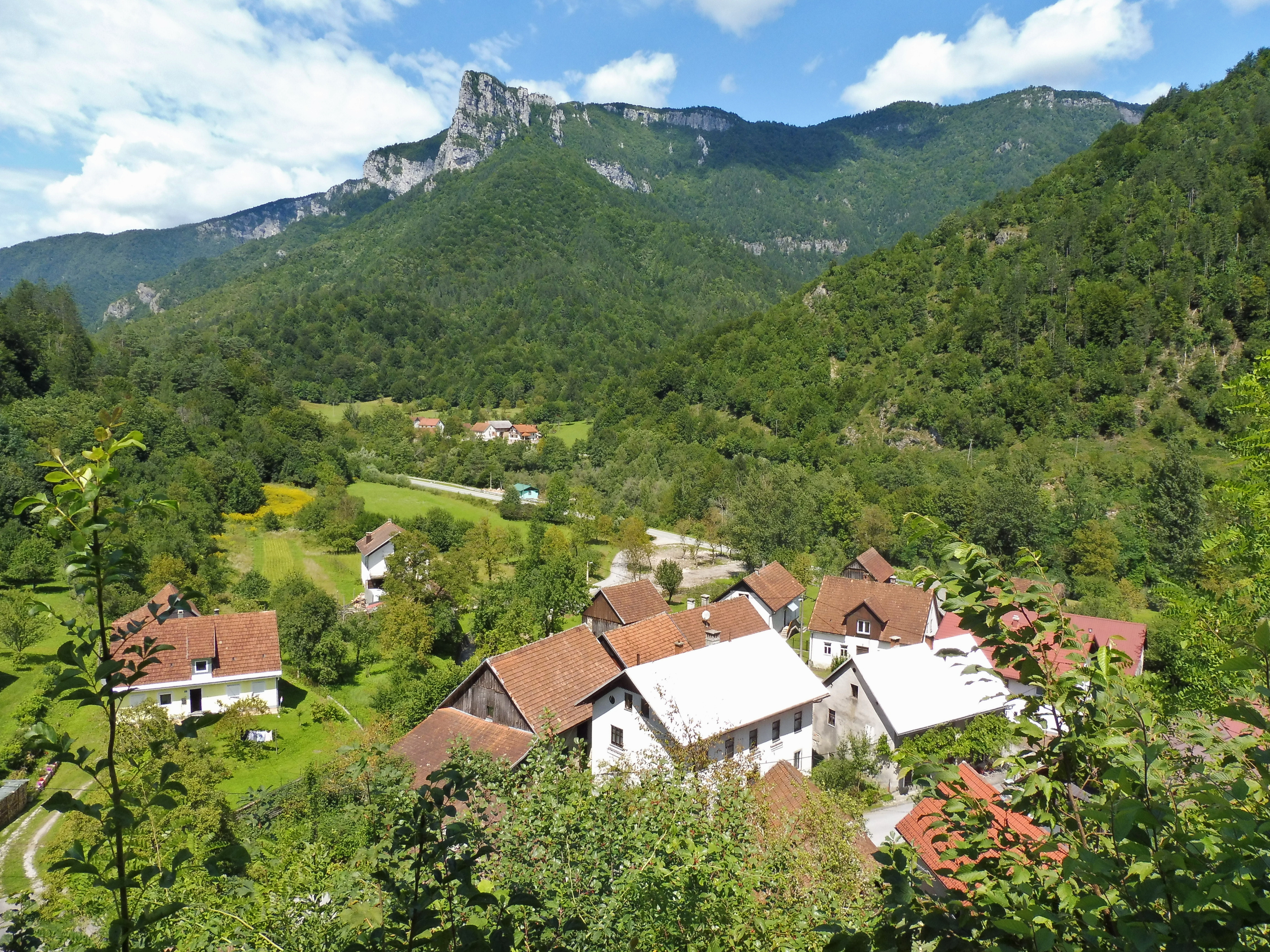

Turke is a settlement in the City of Delnice in Croatia. In 2021, its population was 19.

== History ==
=== Kingdom of Yugoslavia ===
A 22 December 1939 decision as part of agrarian reforms by Ban Šubašić to confiscate the local forest property of the Thurn and Taxis family, Kálmán Ghyczy and Nikola Petrović resulted in a legal dispute known as the Thurn and Taxis Affair, in part because of the relative status of the family and in part because of the proximity to the Italian border.

=== WWII ===
==== 1942 ====
At 21:30 on 30 April 1942, a group of Partisans from the 2nd battalion of the Notranjska Detachment and part of the 3rd battalion of the Primorje-Gorski Kotar Detachment attacked the outpost of the Croatian Armed Forces in Brod na Kupi with multiple machine guns, simultaneously attacking the Financial Guard. There were around 120 Partisans with 5 machine guns against 10 Croatian soldiers. After a short battle, the soldiers were disarmed, and a Croatian soldier Luka Klanac was captured by the Partisans and taken to their camp. 4 financial guardsmen fled, later appearing in Delnice, while 6 were captured. On 1 May, about 300 rebels from the Croatian side moving along the road through Kuželj joined about 600 Partisans from the Slovene side and completed the capture of Brod, confiscating the soldiers' uniforms and imprisoning them in their barracks, eventually taking several soldiers with them and letting two go on 9 May. The fate of the Croatian garrison in Turke, which had been withdrawn to that village from Hrvatsko, remained unknown, save for Franjo Drašković who was taken with them. The Delnice-Brod connection was cut the same day by these Partisans, at 15:30. The Italian garrison of around 150 in Brod had retreated on 29 April to Kočevje and were poorly defended, but on 10 May, the Italian army entered Brod from all sides and the Partisans fled.

==== 1945 ====
At the behest of Dušan Rašković, Josip Posiek parish priest of Lokve and others gathered in Delnice signed a document recognising the JNOF on 21 February 1945, selecting a delegation to represent the priesthood before their authority.

== Demographics ==
Turke: Population trends 1857–2021
v

population	144	158	123	130	126	161	145	140	111	99	111	84	63	58	44	31	19
	1857	1869	1880	1890	1900	1910	1921	1931	1948	1953	1961	1971	1981	1991	2001	2011	2021

Sources: Croatian Bureau of Statistics publications

== Governance ==
=== National ===
At the 1920 Kingdom of Serbs, Croats and Slovenes Constitutional Assembly election in Modruš-Rijeka County, Turke voted mainly for the Croatian People's Peasant Party.

Results at the poll in Turke
Year	Voters	Electors	NRS	DSD	KPJ	HPSS	Independent	SS	HSP	HZ
1920	506	139	2	12	2	117				6

== Sports ==
Beginning in 2013, the 7 stage 260 kilometres (160 mi) long Cycling Trail of Gorski Kotar (Croatian: Goranska biciklistička transverzala) passes through Turke.

== Bibliography ==
=== History ===
- OONF PGO (1945-03-19). "Svećenstvo Gorskog Kotara pristupa JNOf-i". Primorski vjesnik: Glasilo jedinstvene Narodno-oslobodilačke fronte Hrvatskog primorja (in Serbo-Croatian). No. 144. p. 4.
- Prusac, Stjepan (2023-09-26) [defended 2023-09-25]. Posjedi obitelji Thurn Taxis nakon 1918. godine [Thurn Taxis Estates in Croatia after First World War] (Thesis) (in Croatian). Zagreb: Filozofski fakultet Sveučilišta u Zagrebu.
- Trgo, Fabijan, ed. (1964). Zbornik dokumenata i podataka o Narodno-oslobodilačkom ratu Jugoslovenskih naroda. Vol. V, 32.
- Banska vlast Banovine Hrvatske (1940b). "Gospodarska prosvjeta i banovinska dobra". Godišnjak banske vlasti Banovine Hrvatske. Vol. 1. pp. 89–96.
