= Brod na Kupi =

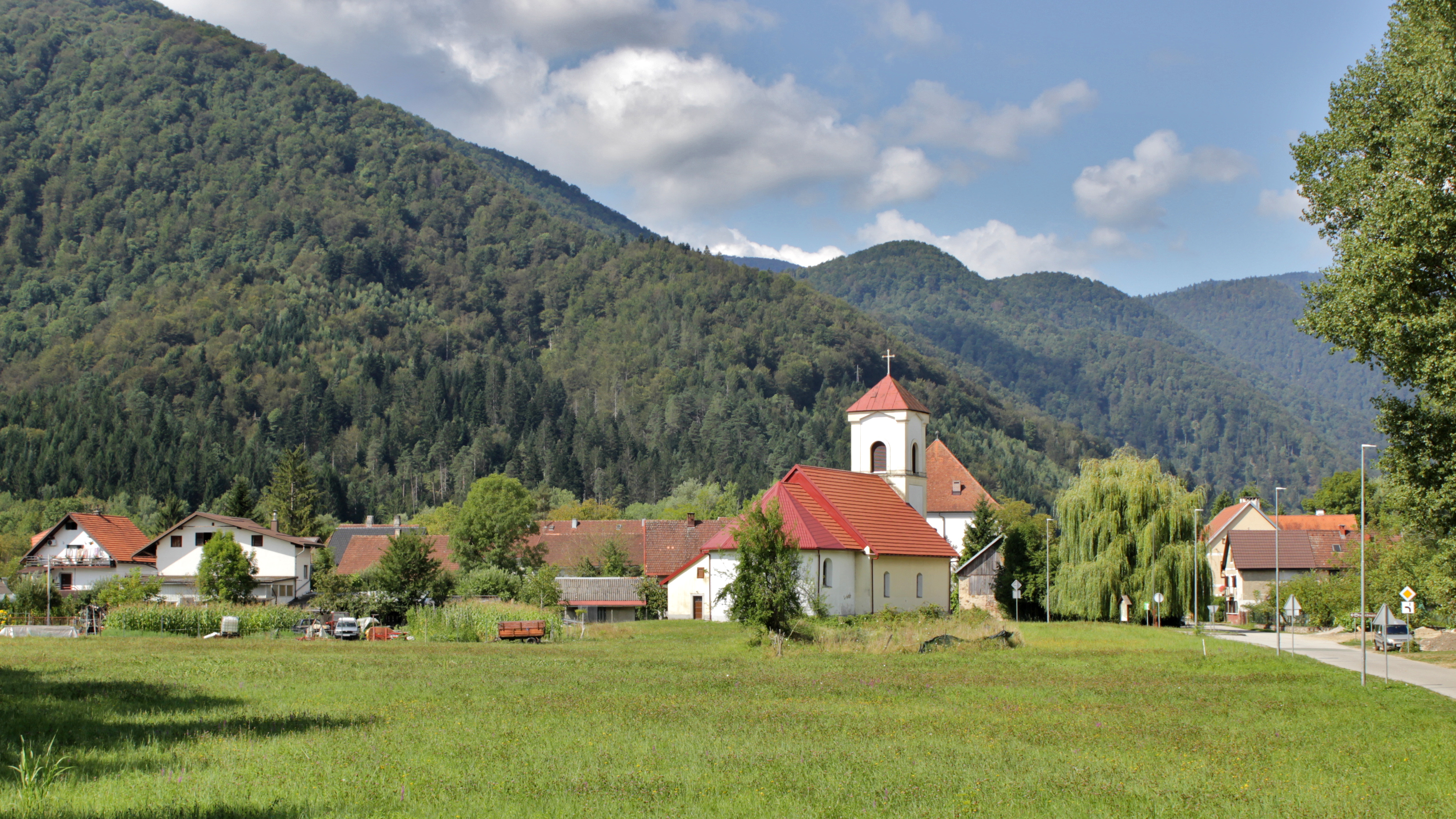

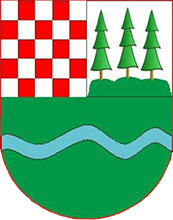
- Seal

- Location within Croatia
- Coordinates: 45°28′N 14°51′E
- Country: Croatia
- County: Primorje-Gorski Kotar
- City: Delnice

Area
  - Total: 0.6 km^{2} (0.23 sq mi)

Population (2021)
  - Total: 156
  - Density: 260/km^{2} (670/sq mi)
- Time zone: UTC+1 (CET)
  - Summer (DST): UTC+2 (CEST)

Brod na Kupi (pronounced [brɔ̂ːd na kûpi]) is a village located 12 km north of Delnice, in the western part of Gorski Kotar in Croatia. A bridge connects it with Petrina in Slovenia. Its population is 207 (2011 census).

== History ==
Brod na Kupi was first mentioned on 22 February 1481 in a document freeing the citizens of Grič from tariffs in Brod and elsewhere.

On 4 June 1657, as part of a delimitation between the possessions of the Zrinski family in Brod and those of the Frankapan family in Severin, a document was drawn up before a committee in Moravičke Drage consisting of baron Planker oberhautmann of Karlovac on behalf of Juraj IV Frankapan and Juraj Sili kapetan dvoranski and vicekapetan of Žumberak and Boltizar Babonosić prefect of Ozalj on behalf of Petar Zrinski. Those who gave testimony about the boundary were Martin Goljak (80), Matija Šnepergar (80), Mihajlo Šepec (80), Petar Butina (85), Petar Abramović (85), Lovro Crnković (85), Juraj Šnepergar (88), Juraj Podnar (90), Matija Goljak (90), Jakov Goršet (90), Jakov Butina (90) and Martin Blažević who claimed to be a centenarian and helped build the Turanj tower in Gornje Moravice when ordered by brothers Juraj and Nikola Zrinski.

It was recorded as Brod on the 1673 map of Stjepan Glavač.

The volunteer fire department DVD Brod na Kupi was founded on 2 April 1882, and is today part of the Požarno područje Gorski Kotar I. Its current commander is Milan Šokčević.

In 1899, the notary of Brod, M. Pavelić, set out to excavate an easier path down to the source of the Kupa.

=== Kingdom of Yugoslavia ===
In early August 1933, the local chapter of the HPS, PD "Hajdova hiša", was founded, with Matija Štimac as its temporary president. Already in November, its membership reached 28, and Antun Grgurić was elected president. Its founding members included the općinski načelnik, Mato Ofak, as well as Ivan Grčević, (Note: The principal of the elementary school in Brod.) Josip Šneler, (Note: A prominent merchant.) Štirl Karlo, (Note: The local doctor.) Martin Ožanić and others. They initially met in the Općinski Dom, and their first major project that year was to mark and clear the path to the source of the Kupa, since it was visited by many foreign tourists every year. The clearing was done by the state forestry service. Soon, however, "Hajdova hiša" had difficulty operating at all, and it was liquidated on 12 November 1936.

A 22 December 1939 decision as part of agrarian reforms by Ban Šubašić to confiscate the local forest property of the Thurn and Taxis family, Kálmán Ghyczy and Nikola Petrović resulted in a legal dispute known as the Thurn and Taxis Affair, in part because of the relative status of the family and in part because of the proximity to the Italian border.

=== WWII ===
==== 1942 ====
The Italians withdrew from Brod na Kupi on 20 January 1942. The Italians did not leave those towns along the railway, which they fortified with barbed wire

At 21:30 on 30 April 1942, a group of Partisans from the 2nd battalion of the Notranjska Detachment and part of the 3rd battalion of the Primorje-Gorski Kotar Detachment attacked the outpost of the Croatian Armed Forces in Brod with multiple machine guns, simultaneously attacking the Financial Guard. There were around 120 Partisans with 5 machine guns against 10 Croatian soldiers. After a short battle, the soldiers were disarmed, and a Croatian soldier Luka Klanac was captured by the Partisans and taken to their camp. 4 financial guardsmen fled, later appearing in Delnice, while 6 were captured. On 1 May, about 300 rebels from the Croatian side moving along the road through Kuželj joined about 600 Partisans from the Slovene side and completed the capture of Brod, confiscating the soldiers' uniforms and imprisoning them in their barracks, eventually taking with them soldiers Mate Mese, Josip Stipetić, Domobran Mato Momitrović and Jure Tonković. They let Josip Ivančić and Marko Magličić go on 9 May. The fate of the Croatian garrison in Turke, which had been withdrawn to that village from Hrvatsko, remained unknown, save for Franjo Drašković. The Delnice-Brod connection was cut the same day by these Partisans, at 15:30. The Italian garrison of around 150 in Brod had retreated on 29 April to Kočevje and were poorly defended, but on 10 May, the Italian army entered Brod from all sides and the Partisans fled. The commander Josip Seleš, who had remained imprisoned, was thus freed along with Ivan Barković and Josip Soldatić.

On 9 June, Partisans attacked Italian soldiers on the territory of Brod. The battle lasted 5 hours.

==== 1945 ====
At the behest of Dušan Rašković, Ivan Butorac deacon of the Brod deaconate and parish priest of Mrkopalj and others gathered in Delnice signed a document recognising the JNOF on 21 February 1945, selecting a delegation to represent the priesthood before their authority. Butorac was chosen as the religious delegate of Gorski Kotar to the JNOF.

=== Recent ===
On 19 September 2010, heavy rain led to severe flooding in Brod.

On 16 September 2022, torrential rains caused locally extreme flooding in Brod.

== Demographics ==
In 1870, Brod općina, in Delnice podžupanija, had 625 houses, with a population of 4334. Its 53 villages were divided into 5 porezne obćine for taxation purposes. Parishes included Brod, Kuželj, Turke and Podstene, and the curate of Razloge.

In 1895, the obćina of Brod na Kupi (court at Brod na Kupi), with an area of 119 square kilometres (46 mi^{2}), belonged to the kotar of Delnice (Delnice court and electoral district) in the županija of Modruš-Rieka (Ogulin court and financial board). There were 718 houses, with a population of 3788 (the highest in Delnice kotar). Its 53 villages and 7 hamlets were divided for taxation purposes into 5 porezne obćine, under the Delnice office.

Town of Brod na Kupi: Population trends 1857–2021
v

population	172	187	197	174	189	266	196	166	125	171	179	161	150	176	248	207	156
	1857	1869	1880	1890	1900	1910	1921	1931	1948	1953	1961	1971	1981	1991	2001	2011	2021

Note:"Brod" until 1869. Sources: Croatian Bureau of Statistics publications

== Governance ==
=== National ===
At the 1920 Kingdom of Serbs, Croats and Slovenes Constitutional Assembly election in Modruš-Rijeka County, Brod na Kupi voted mainly for the Croatian People's Peasant Party.

Results at the poll in Brod na Kupi
Year	Voters	Electors	NRS	DSD	KPJ	HPSS	Independent	SS	HSP	HZ
1920	782	350		17	17	305	1			10

=== Local ===
Representatives of the Brod kotar at the Sabor:

- Ljudevit Karoly (1848) (Note: Representative of Gorski, Čabar and Brodski kotar.)
- Ljudevit Otto (1868), (Note: Čabar-Brod) NUS
- Ivan Vončina (1868), NS
- Franjo Rački (1871), NS/NLS/NNS
- Lovro Vidrić (1875–1881)

=== Judiciary ===
In 1875, the kotar court of Delnice encompassed a population of 28,347, being responsible for the općine: Delnice, Lokve, Fužine, Mrkopalj, Ravna Gora, Brod, Skrad, Vrbovsko.

== Culture ==
=== Cuisine ===
The society Plodovi gorja Gorskog kotara (Note: Official website) organises "Apple days" (Croatian: Dani jabuka) in Brod.

== Sports ==
Beginning in 2013, the 7 stage 260 kilometres (160 mi) long Cycling Trail of Gorski Kotar (Croatian: Goranska biciklistička transverzala) passes through Brod, where the third stage ends and the fourth begins.

== Attractions ==
The 11,700 square metres (126,000 ft^{2}) school garden was started in the second half of the 20th century and remains unprotected.

== Notable people ==
Notable people that were born or lived in Brod na Kupi include:

- Eugen Kvaternik (31 October 1825 – 11 October 1871)
- David Belošević, county judge
- Marijan Ofak (5 August 1924 – 20 August 1968)

== Gallery ==
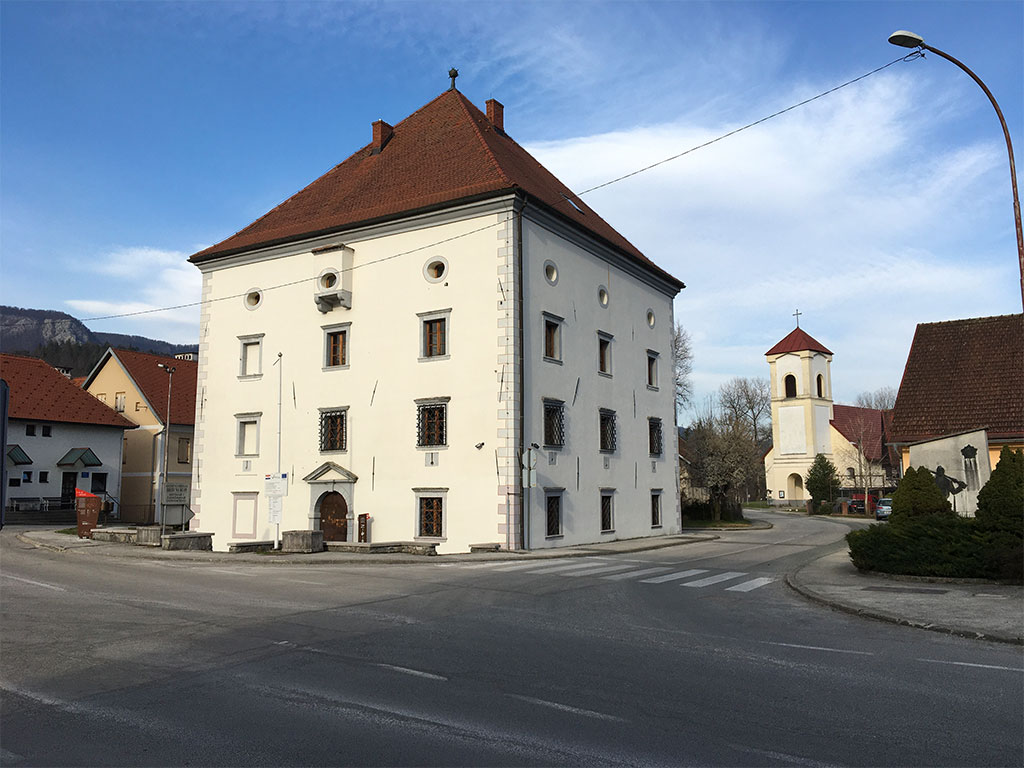
Zrinski family castle.

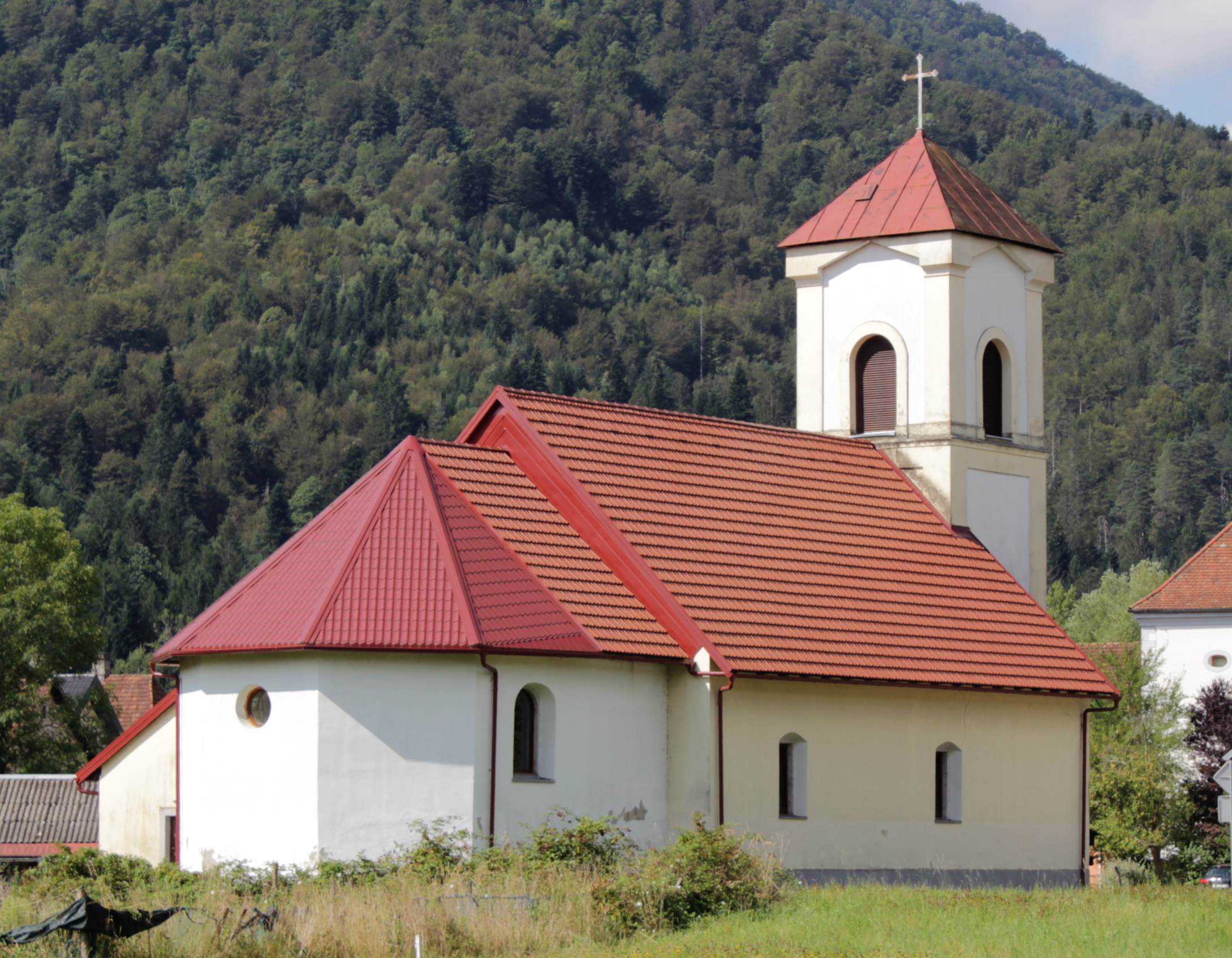
Sv. Marije Magdalene church.

== Bibliography ==
- OONF PGO (1945-03-19). "Svećenstvo Gorskog Kotara pristupa JNOf-i". Primorski vjesnik: Glasilo jedinstvene Narodno-oslobodilačke fronte Hrvatskog primorja (in Serbo-Croatian). No. 144. p. 4.
- Melem Hajdarović, Mihela (2023-06-14). "Glavačeva karta Hrvatske iz 1673. – njezini toponimi, geografski sadržaj i historijskogeografski kontekst" [Glavač’s map of Croatia from 1673: Its toponyms, geographical content, and historical-geographical context]. Studia lexicographica. 17 (32): 47–78. doi:10.33604/sl.17.32.2. eISSN 2459-5578.
