= Law enforcement in the Azores =

Law enforcement in the Azores is part of the law enforcement in Portugal.

The atlantic archipelago of Azores constitutes one of the two autonomous regions of Portugal, with a number of devolved powers being performed by its Regional Government. However, the law enforcement in the region remains mainly under the responsibility of the Central Government of Portugal, being performed by the several Portuguese national police agencies. There are, however, minor law enforcement agencies dependent from the Regional Government of Azores like the forest police and the sanitary, food and economical police. Also, at the end of 2009, Ponta Delgada became the first city of a Portuguese autonomous region to create its own municipal police force.

The several law enforcement agencies that operate in the Azores police a population of 240,000 people over an area of 2,333 km^{2}.

== National law enforcement agencies operating in the Azores ==
1. Public Security Police (PSP) - Regional Command of the Azores: responsible for the preventive police in the region. In contrast to what happens in Mainland Portugal - where PSP only operates in the main urban metropolitan areas and cities - in Azores it is also responsible for rural policing;
2. National Republican Guard (GNR) - Territorial Command of the Azores: responsible for customs, border and maritime patrol. In contrast to what happens in Mainland Portugal, GNR has not rural policing responsibilities in Azores. Except for a brief period in the 1940s and 1950s operating only as military police, GNR was not present in Azores until 1993, when it absorbed the former Fiscal Guard, including its units and responsibilities in the archipelago;
3. Judicial Police (PJ) - Criminal Investigation Department of Ponta Delgada: responsible for the criminal investigation related with serious crimes;
4. Foreign and Border Service (SEF) - Regional Directory of the Azores: responsible for border and immigration control.

== See also ==
- Law enforcement in Madeira
- Law enforcement in Portugal
