= Law enforcement in Madeira =

Law enforcement in Madeira is part of the law enforcement in Portugal.

The atlantic archipelago of Madeira constitutes one of the two autonomous regions of Portugal, with a number of devolved powers being performed by its Regional Government. However, the law enforcement in the region remains mainly under the responsibility of the Central Government of Portugal, being performed by the several Portuguese national police agencies. There are, however, minor law enforcement agencies dependent from the Regional Government of Madeira like the forest police and the sanitary, food and economical police.

The several police forces in Madeira provide security for the archipelago's 797 km² of territory and population of 267,000

== National law enforcement agencies operating in Madeira ==
1. Public Security Police (PSP) – Regional Command of Madeira: responsible for the preventive police in the region. In contrast to what happens in Mainland Portugal – where PSP only operates in the main urban metropolitan areas and cities – in Madeira it is also responsible for rural policing;
2. National Republican Guard (GNR) – Territorial Command of Madeira: responsible for customs, border and maritime patrol. In contrast to what happens in Mainland Portugal, GNR has not rural policing responsibilities in Madeira. The presence of GNR in Madeira dates only from 1993, when it absorbed the former Fiscal Guard, including its units and responsibilities in the archipelago;
3. Judicial Police (PJ) – Criminal Investigation Department of Funchal: responsible for the criminal investigation related with serious crimes;
4. Foreign and Border Service (SEF) – Regional Directory of Madeira: responsible for border and immigration control.

== See also ==
- Law enforcement in the Azores
- Law enforcement in Portugal

== Sources ==
1. World Police Encyclopedia, ed. by Dilip K. Das & Michael Palmiotto published by Taylor & Francis. 2004,
2. World Encyclopedia of Police Forces and Correctional Systems, second edition, 2006 by Gale.
3. Sullivan, Larry E. Encyclopedia of Law Enforcement. Thousand Oaks: Sage Publications, 2005.
