= Guarda Fiscal =

Portuguese special military police unit

Fiscal Guard Guarda Fiscal
- Abbreviation: GF
- Motto: Portuguese: Pela Pátria e pela Lei; For the Motherland and for the Law

Agency overview
- Formed: September 17, 1885
- Preceding agency: Barrier guards (Guardas barreiras)
- Dissolved: 1993
- Superseding agency: Fiscal Brigade of the Guarda Nacional Republicana (GNR)
- Employees: 8500 military 100 civilian

Jurisdictional structure
- National agency: Portugal
- Operations jurisdiction: Portugal
- Governing body: Ministry of Finance (Portugal)
- General nature: Gendarmerie; Civilian police
- Specialist jurisdictions: Customs, excise, gambling; Taxation; National border patrol, security, integrity

Operational structure
- Headquarters: Lisbon
- Elected officer responsible: Several, Minister of Finance
- Agency executive: Several, Commander-General

The Guarda Fiscal (Fiscal Guard in English) was a Portuguese special military force, tasked with the border and maritime control of people and goods and the law enforcement, particularly in the fields of taxation and customs.

In time of peace, the Guarda Fiscal was under the authority of the Ministry of Finance. In case of war, the Guarda Fiscal would pass for the authority of the Portuguese Armed Forces, forming combat units that would be used primarily in the border defense.

The Guarda Fiscal was formed on September 17, 1885, based on the Barrier Guards detached from the former Royal Guard of the Police (ancestor of the present National Republican Guard) for the tax and customs service. In 1993, the Guarda Fiscal was dissolved as an independent corps, becoming the Fiscal Brigade of the National Republican Guard (GNR). In 2009, the Fiscal Brigade was divided into the current Fiscal Action and Coastal Control units of the GNR.

The Garda Fiscal in popular culture is part of a larger set of stories about the Portuguese-Galician rivalry between them at the border.

== See also ==
- Financial Guard (disambiguation)
- Law enforcement in Portugal
- Law enforcement in Azores
- Law enforcement in Madeira
