= Crime in Portugal =

Crime in Portugal is combatted by a host of government agencies including the Ministry of Internal Administration, Ministry of Justice, Maritime Authority System, Economic and Food Safety Authority, and the Informations System of the Portuguese Republic, among others. Portugal has been a member of the International Criminal Police Organization (ICPO), commonly known as INTERPOL, since 1930.

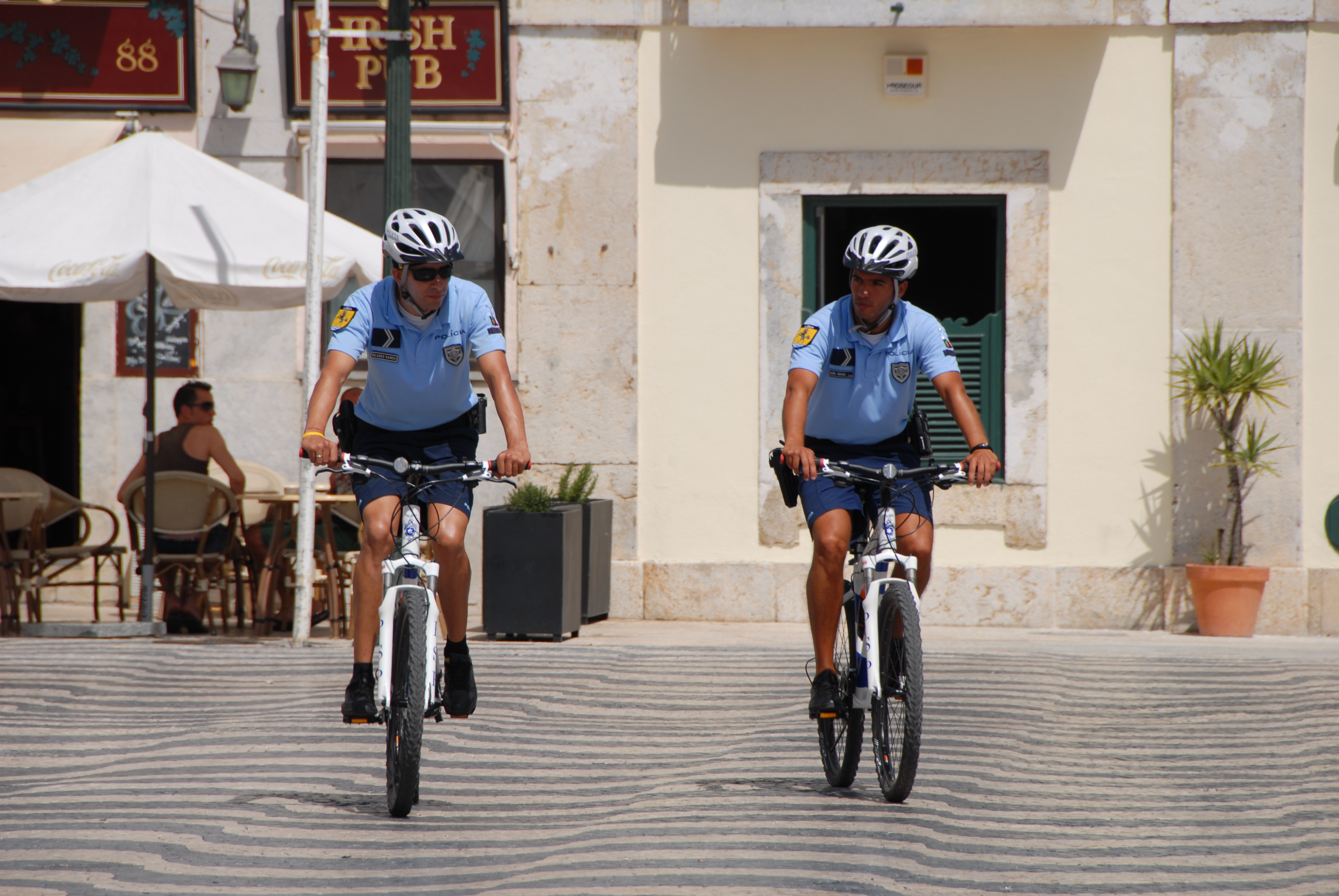
Portuguese police patrolling on bicycle a street in Lisbon.

Crime rates in Portugal are generally low, and most crimes are non-violent. Portugal's security and peace indicators compare favourably to those of other countries: According to the Institute for Economics and Peace's 2024 Global Peace Index report, Portugal ranks as the 7th most peaceful country in the world. According to Gallup’s 2024 Global Safety Report, 83% of people in Portugal felt safe walking alone at night in the place where they live in 2023.

== Crime by type ==
Crime in Portugal
- Homicide: 0.7 (2023)
- Assault: 7.3 (2023)
- Burglary: 149.5 (2024)
- Theft: 737.2 (2024)
- Fraud: 436.3 (2024)
- Corruption: 2.1 (2024)
- Bribery: 0.5 (2024)
- Money laundering: 1.3 (2024)
- Rape: 4.7 (2023)
- Sexual violence: 30.9 (2023)
- reported per 100,000 inhabitants

=== Murder ===
In 2019 the murder rate was 0.7 per 100,000 people in Portugal; Murder rates per 100,000 people by region were 0.5 in The North, 1.4 in The Algarve, 0.6 in Central Portugal, 0.7 in The Metropolitan Area of Lisbon, 1.0 in The Alentejo, 0.8 in the autonomous island region of The Azores, and 0.0 in the autonomous island region of Madeira.

In 2021 there were a total of 85 murders registered in Portugal; 78 occurred on Continental Portugal, 4 on the autonomous island region of The Azores, and 3 on the autonomous island region of Madeira.

=== Rape ===
In 2021 there were a total of 400 cases of rape registered in Portugal (an increase of 82, or 26% over 2020).

=== Assault ===
In 2021 there were a total of 48,572 crimes of assault registered in Portugal; 44,995 occurred on Continental Portugal, 2,046 on the autonomous island region of The Azores, and 1,517 on the autonomous island region of Madeira.

=== Human trafficking ===
Portugal is a destination and transit country for women, men, and children subjected to human trafficking, specifically forced prostitution and forced labor, as of 2010. Between 2008 and 2016, authorities confirmed a total of 569 victims of human trafficking in Portugal. Of the victims, 68% were from Europe; 36% were Romanian, 28% were Portuguese, and 4% were Bulgarian. For 63% of the victims, Portugal was a Country of Destination, for 28% it was a Country of Origin, and for 9% it was a Country of Transit. Of the total, 417 victims were trafficked for the purpose of labour exploitation. Children from Eastern Europe, including Roma people, have been subjected to forced begging, sometimes by their families.

The U.S. State Department's Office to Monitor and Combat Trafficking in Persons placed the country in "Tier 1" in 2017. The country was at Tier 2 in 2023.

From 2016 to 2020, Portugal identified 1152 victims of human trafficking (an average of almost 25 people per month); most of these were working in agriculture.

In 2023, the Organized Crime Index noted that Portugal was mainly a destination country for groups in Eastern Europe, China, and Morocco.

Portugal ratified the 2000 UN TIP Protocol in May 2004.

=== Domestic violence ===
In 2021 there were a total of 22,524 crimes of Domestic Violence registered in Portugal; 21,028 occurred on Continental Portugal, 846 on the autonomous island region of The Azores, and 647 on the autonomous island region of Madeira.

=== Hate crime ===
Racially motivated hate crimes have increased dramatically in recent years; In 2020 there were a total of 655 complaints of racist abuse (an increase of 50% over 2019) filed with The Portuguese Commission for Equality and Against Racial Discrimination (official abbreviation "CICDR"; Portuguese; Comissão para a Igualdade e Contra a Discriminação Racial).

=== Robbery ===
According to Eurostat data from 2019, Portugal had a robbery rate of 106 per 100,000 inhabitants per year. This ranks as the fourth highest robbery rate of the countries measured for that year, after England, Spain, and Belgium.

=== Theft ===
Pickpockets and purse snatchers are present in crowded popular tourist sites, restaurants, transportation hubs and on public transportation in the largest cities, especially within the Lisbon and Porto metropolitan areas. While thieves may operate anywhere, the largest number of reports of theft received by the authorities are usually from heavily populated areas and major tourist destinations.

In 2021 there were a total of 6,053 incidents of theft in public places (excluding theft from motor vehicles and carjackings) registered in Portugal; 5,863 occurred on Continental Portugal, 81 on the autonomous island region of The Azores, and 107 on the autonomous island region of Madeira.

In 2021 there were a total of 29,735 incidents of theft from motor vehicles and carjackings registered in Portugal; 28,922 incidents occurred on Continental Portugal, 569 on the autonomous island region of The Azores, and 239 on the autonomous island region of Madeira.

=== Organised crime ===
With the development and modernisation of the economy within the globalisation process, corporate crime, financial crime, and corruption are increasingly important issues.

According to the World Economic Forum's 2019 Global Competitiveness Report, Portugal ranked 9th best out of 141 countries for level of costs imposed on businesses by organised crime. According to the 2021 Global Organized Crime Index, Portugal received a score of 4.55 for criminality, and 6.46 for resilience, ranking 117th, and 29th out of 193 countries globally, 24th, and 21st out of 44 countries in Europe, and 5th, and 2nd out of 8 countries in Southern Europe.

The Galician clans, particularly the Los Charlines clan, have been major players in illicit drug trafficking, primarily involved in smuggling cocaine and hashish from Colombia and Morocco into Portugal via sea routes since the 1970s.

Various groups of the Italian Mafia have been known to be active throughout Portugal since at least the 1980s. The Camorra is known to be active in Porto where it is involved in the business of fake designer fashion merchandise. Calabrian organised crime group 'Ndrangheta has been involved in drug trafficking, as well as money laundering specifically through the tourism sector.

Organised crime groups from former Soviet states have been increasingly active in the Iberian Peninsula since the 1990s, especially after the fall of the USSR. In 2016, members of a Russian criminal gang led by Alexander Tolstikov, with ties to the Russian mafia, were caught running a money laundering operation using the Portuguese football club U.D. Leiria. By 2019, members of the Georgian mafia had committed over 370 burglaries throughout Portugal. In 2021, two members of the Montenegrin Kavač clan, which is responsible for money laundering, extortion, and smuggling cocaine from South America into Europe, were arrested in Portugal after living and operating discreetly in the country for nearly one year.

Since the 2000s, Mexican drug cartels including Joaquín 'El Chapo' Guzmán's Sinaloa Cartel, Los Zetas, and the Gulf Cartel, have been establishing their presence in Portugal. Of these three, the Sinaloa cartel has evolved to become the one with the most dominant presence in the country, where it is involved in drug trafficking and money laundering. The group's primary modus operandi is smuggling cocaine of Colombian origin into Portugal, with the aid of corrupt officials and businessmen; The smuggling operation is overseen by Joaquín Guzmán's two sons Iván Archivaldo, and Jesús Alfredo. Once in Portugal, only a small amount of the smuggled cocaine remains in the country; The majority is transferred to partners with whom the Sinaloa Cartel has alliances, including Portuguese, Brazilian and Russian drug traffickers, who then distribute the drugs throughout the rest of Europe to command higher prices.

In the 2010s the presence of Brazilian organised crime group First Capital Command (abbreviation "PCC"; Portuguese; Primeiro Comando da Capital) in Portugal was confirmed for the first time by Portuguese authorities. A federal report by the Brazilian government revealed that there were at least 43 members of the group involved in drug trafficking known to be operating in Portugal, the highest number of any country in Europe. First Capital Command has had a working relationship with 'Ndrangheta since the 1980s to export drugs from Brazil to Europe, where 'Ndrangheta then takes over trafficking and distribution operations throughout the continent.

=== Corruption ===
In Transparency International's 2021 Corruption Perceptions Index, Portugal scored 62 out of 100, ranking it 32nd out of 180 countries surveyed. The nonprofit's 2021 Global Corruption Barometer revealed that of those surveyed, when asked if they thought that the level of corruption had changed in the past twelve months, and if so how, 41% said that corruption had increased, 13% said it had decreased, 41% said it had remained the same, and 4% either did not know, or declined to answer.

The percentage of people surveyed who thought that most, or all of the people in specific institutions were involved in corruption was 33% for bankers, 27% for business executives, 27% for Members of Parliament, 19% for local government representatives (including mayors), 16% for national government officials, 15% for the Prime Minister, 13% for non-governmental organisations, 11% for judges and magistrates, and 5% for the police.

The bribery rate for public services overall, based on people who had used them within the past twelve months was 3%. For specific services, the rates were 3% for social security benefits, 3% for police, 2% for public schools, 2% for public clinics or hospitals, and 2% for identity documents.

== By location ==
Portugal's largest metropolitan areas of Lisbon and Porto are the main sources of both petty and violent crime.

- Greater Lisbon: Theft is widespread in tourist destinations in the Greater Lisbon area such as the towns of Sintra, Cascais, and Mafra. Casal Ventoso, a neighbourhood of Lisbon where drug traffickers and drug users used to gather, was demolished in response to its increasingly unsavoury reputation. Amadora, the municipality where Buraca and the feared Cova da Moura neighbourhood is located, is a stopping point for many of the displaced people of the former Casal Ventoso, and Marvila (a parish in eastern area of the Lisbon municipality), neighbourhoods. Some areas of the municipalities of Odivelas, Loures and Vila Franca de Xira around the Portuguese capital also have a higher incidence of crime. Automobile break-ins sometimes occur in parking areas at tourist attractions and near restaurants. There are reports of organised crime and gangs.
- Greater Porto: There have been reports of theft and violent crime in the area. Some places such as train stations, the Ribeira neighbourhood in Porto, as well as some areas of the Gondomar and Valongo municipalities have been especially problematic. There are reports of organised crime and gangs.
- Algarve: There are few reports of organised crime or gangs, however, as a major centre of international tourism, and located in a corner of Europe geographically close to Northern Africa, the region has been noted for the growing number of cases related to drug trafficking. Pickpockets and other petty criminals exist in moderate numbers (e.g. in Faro). A wave of violent crime targeting wealthy foreign expatriates and tourists residing in the region was noted since the Great Recession, which brought decreasing economic opportunities for African, Eastern European and South American immigrants, and a rise in the number of unemployed Portuguese.
- Azores (archipelago): Pickpocketing and purse snatching are not common occurrences in the Azores. Organised crime is mostly centred around drug trafficking.
- Madeira (archipelago): Pickpocketing, while infrequent, may occur in some areas of Funchal, such as at Pico do Arieiro, Mercado dos Lavradores, Zona Velha (near the cable car), Old Town, and Santa Catarina Park.

Other cities where some violent crime occurs are Aveiro, Braga and Coimbra.

Regions such as Setúbal, Alentejo and Ribatejo are the safest areas next to Lisbon, with lower crime levels compared to the capital.

== Crime dynamics ==
The crime rate rose in the 1990s, reaching an all-time high during much of the decade. It still is low compared to other developed countries, and has decreased substantially beginning in the 2000s. Violent crime also rose during the same period and reached record highs before falling.

== Victims ==
Victims of crime should report to the nearest police station, national republican guard station, judiciary police post, or directly to the public prosecution services. The national telephone emergency number is 112, which is used throughout the European Union. To file a criminal complaint online, victims may use the official Electronic Complaint System Portal (Portuguese; Portal do Sistema Queixa Eletrónica) administered by the Ministry of Internal Administration.

Law enforcement and the justice system assists victims, helping them to find appropriate medical care, contact family members or friends, understand how further legal procedures could be used, understand the criminal justice process, obtain financial compensation, and find an attorney if necessary.

Portugal has a crime victim's assistance program administered through an organisation known as the Portuguese Association for Victim Support (official abbreviation "APAV"; Portuguese; Associação Portuguesa de Apoio à Vítima). The organisation operates a free victims support telephone hotline on weekdays from 9h to 21h, and can be reached by dialling number 116 006, in addition to their website. Services are available in a variety of languages.

== Tolerance of drugs ==
Portugal has arguably the most liberal laws concerning the possession and use of illicit drugs in the Western world. In 2001 Portugal decriminalised possession of effectively all drugs that are still illegal in other developed nations including, but not limited to, marijuana, cocaine, heroin, and LSD. However while drug consumption is not a crime, it is considered an illness, and people who use drugs are in most cases required to undergo rehabilitation. While possession is not a crime, trafficking and possession of amounts greater than "10 days worth of personal use" are still punishable by jail time and fines.

== See also ==
- Law of Portugal
- Law enforcement in Portugal
- Judiciary of Portugal
- Racism in Portugal
