= Law enforcement in Portugal =

Law enforcement in Portugal originated with local communities, under the authority of feudal lords and courts.

In modern times, it is the responsibility of three bodies:

- Guarda Nacional Republicana: National Republican Guard. The Portuguese national gendarmerie force that mainly work out of major cities but in 98% of the Portuguese territory and provides a national highway patrol, a fiscal guard and a national environment protection police.
- Polícia de Segurança Pública: Public Security Police. The Portuguese national civilian police force that works in larger urban areas, as well as at border checks.
- Polícia Judiciária: Judicial Police. Overseen by the Public Ministry, they investigate criminal cases.

== See also ==
- Maritime Authority System

Islands:

- Law enforcement in Madeira
- Law enforcement in the Azores

Crime:

- Crime in Portugal
- Police brutality in Portugal
- Police corruption in Portugal
