= Jean Victor, Count of Novion =

French general, nobleman and politician (1745–1825)

Jean Victor, Count of Novion, as commander of the Royal Guard of Police

Jean Victor, Count of Novion (20 November 1745 – 18 August 1825) was a French nobleman, politician, émigré and officer. He was a deputy to the Estates General of 1789 and later went to Portugal, where he became a colonel and the first commander of the Royal Guard of Police, created in 1801 by Prince Regent João, the predecessor of the National Republican Guard, Portugal's national gendarmerie. After the first French invasion of Portugal in 1807, he returned to France with Junot the following year.

== Biography ==
Novion as a deputy to the States General of 1789

He was born in Thionville, France, in 1745. In 1755, at the age of 10, he joined the Royal Military Academy. He finished his course of study on 2 March 1762, being promoted to lieutenant. He fought in Martinique, Saint-Domingue, and Guadeloupe. He was promoted to ensign in 1765, to lieutenant in 1769, and to captain in 1789.

As captain of the Vermandois Infantry Regiment, he served as deputy suppleant of Amiens to the Estates General of 1789, representing the nobility.

Some time later, he went into exile in Great Britain and then in Portugal. He joined the ranks of the Army, retaining the French rank of lieutenant colonel, to which he was promoted in 1792, and participated in the War of the Oranges in 1801. In the same year, by decree of 10 December, Prince Regent João created the Royal Guard of Police, and Novion was appointed its commander. The following year, he was promoted to colonel. When Portugal was invaded by French troops in 1807, Novion received Junot and was appointed commander of arms of Lisbon in December. On 31 August 1808, he left command of the Guard and left for France with Junot in September. Brigadier Filipe de Sousa Canavarro succeeded him in command of the Guard on 18 October.

He died in Nantes on 18 August 1825.
