= Financial Guard (Romania) =

Financial Guard Garda Financiară
- Coat of Arms of the Financial Guard

Agency overview
- Formed: 1991
- Dissolved: November 2013

Jurisdictional structure
- National agency (Operations jurisdiction): Romania
- Operations jurisdiction: Romania
- Legal jurisdiction: As per operations jurisdiction
- Specialist jurisdictions: Customs, excise, gambling; Taxation

Operational structure
- Headquarters: Bucharest
- Agency executive: Adrian Cucu, Comisar general
- Parent agency: Ministry of Economy and Finance

Website
- www.gardafinanciara.ro

The Financial Guard (Romanian: Garda Financiară) was the control agency, subordinated to the National Agency for Fiscal Administration (ANAF), with a mandate to control the financial, economic and customs domains to prevent and sanction the tax evasion and tax-related fraud according to the legislation in effect. The institution was headed by a civil servant, having the mandate of the Chief Commissioner, being appointed by the Minister of Public Finance.

The Financial Guard could identify acts and deeds that had the effect of evasion and tax fraud, identifying their fiscal implications and having, under the Tax Code Procedure, taking the precautionary measures - imposing the seizure - whenever there was a danger that the debtor would evade from prosecution, hide or waste the property. Also, the Financial Guard's Commissioners may carry out, in the course of the operative and unannounced check, the monitoring and verification necessary to prevent, detect and combat tax evasion.

Since January 2010, the Financial Guard had acquired new powers, principally to conclude control acts to establish the tax situation and to establish the circumstances in the commission of criminal-law acts in the financial-fiscal field.

The Financial Guard has the following structure:

- The General Commissariat;
- County Sections and the Bucharest City Hall.

At the end of 2009, the Financial Guard reported a contribution of over 2,240 million lei (over 530 million euro) to the state budget, the recovery of funds reported by the economic agents regarding the unpaid obligations at the legal deadlines.

== History ==
By GEO no. 74/2013, the Financial Guard was abolished, and the "General Anti-Fraud Directorate" (DGAF) was established.

== See also ==
- Financial Guard (disambiguation)
