= Kuželj, Croatia =

Settlement in Croatia

Kuželj
- settlement
- Interactive map of Kuželj
- Location within Croatia
- Coordinates: 45°28′33″N 14°48′19″E
- Country: Croatia
- County: Primorje-Gorski Kotar
- City: Delnice

Area
  - Total: 8.3 km^{2} (3.2 sq mi)

Population (2021)
  - Total: 28
  - Density: 3.4/km^{2} (8.7/sq mi)
- Time zone: UTC+1 (CET)
  - Summer (DST): UTC+2 (CEST)
- Postal code: 51300 Delnice

Kuželj is a settlement in the City of Delnice in Croatia. In 2021, its population was 28.

== History ==
=== WWII ===
At 21:30 on 30 April 1942, a group of Partisans from the 2nd battalion of the Notranjska Detachment and part of the 3rd battalion of the Primorje-Gorski Kotar Detachment attacked the outpost of the Croatian Armed Forces in Brod na Kupi with multiple machine guns, simultaneously attacking the Financial Guard. There were around 120 Partisans with five machine guns against 10 Croatian soldiers. After a short battle, the soldiers were disarmed, and a Croatian soldier Luka Klanac was captured by the Partisans and taken to their camp. Four financial guardsmen fled, later appearing in Delnice, while six were captured.

On 1 May, about 300 rebels from the Croatian side moving along the road through Kuželj joined about 600 Partisans from the Slovene side and completed the capture of Brod, confiscating the soldiers' uniforms and imprisoning them in their barracks, eventually taking several soldiers with them. The Delnice-Brod connection was cut the same day by these Partisans, at 15:30.

The Italian garrison of around 150 in Brod had retreated on 29 April to Kočevje and were poorly defended, but on 10 May, the Italian army entered Brod from all sides and the Partisans fled.

At the behest of Dušan Rašković, Janko Weingerl parish priest of Kuželj and others gathered in Delnice signed a document recognising the JNOF on 21 February 1945, selecting a delegation to represent the priesthood before their authority.

=== Recent ===
On 16 September 2022, torrential rains caused locally extreme flooding in Kuželj.

== Demographics ==
Kuželj: Population trends 1857–2021
v

population	285	239	221	244	204	219	194	195	147	140	124	95	79	49	35	52	28
	1857	1869	1880	1890	1900	1910	1921	1931	1948	1953	1961	1971	1981	1991	2001	2011	2021

Sources: Croatian Bureau of Statistics publications

== Bibliography ==
- OONF PGO (1945-03-19). "Svećenstvo Gorskog Kotara pristupa JNOf-i". Primorski vjesnik: Glasilo jedinstvene Narodno-oslobodilačke fronte Hrvatskog primorja (in Serbo-Croatian). No. 144. p. 4.
- Trgo, Fabijan, ed. (1964). Zbornik dokumenata i podataka o Narodno-oslobodilačkom ratu Jugoslovenskih naroda. Vol. V, 32.
