= Brigada de Trânsito =

Portuguese special traffic force

The Traffic Brigade (Portuguese: Brigada de Trânsito) was a Portuguese special traffic force, from the National Republican Guard, which controls the traffic out of the urban areas, they can in some cases act in cities, if they catch violators in those areas.

They are mainly responsible for highways and national roads traffic patrolling.

It was extinct in 2007. The new orgas are "Unidade Nacional de Trânsito" and "Destacamentos de Trânsito dos Comandos Territoriais".

== Official link ==
- GNR - Brigada de Trânsito
