= Hrvatsko, Primorje-Gorski Kotar County =

Settlement in Croatia

Hrvatsko
- settlement
- Interactive map of Hrvatsko
- Location within Croatia
- Coordinates: 45°31′56″N 14°42′11″E
- Country: Croatia
- County: Primorje-Gorski Kotar
- City: Delnice

Area
  - Total: 4.1 km^{2} (1.6 sq mi)

Population (2021)
  - Total: 49
  - Density: 12/km^{2} (31/sq mi)
- Time zone: UTC+1 (CET)
  - Summer (DST): UTC+2 (CEST)
- Postal code: 51306 Čabar

Hrvatsko is a settlement in the City of Delnice in Croatia. In 2021, its population was 49.

== Demographics ==
Hrvatsko: Population trends 1857–2021
v

population	121	91	53	68	74	65	58	91	97	101	74	66	66	72	59	49	49
	1857	1869	1880	1890	1900	1910	1921	1931	1948	1953	1961	1971	1981	1991	2001	2011	2021

Sources: Croatian Bureau of Statistics publications

== Sports ==
Beginning in 2013, the 7 stage 260 kilometres (160 mi) long Cycling Trail of Gorski Kotar (Croatian: Goranska biciklistička transverzala) passes through Hrvatsko.

== Bibliography ==
- Šašić, Martina; Nahirnić, Ana; Tarmann, Gerhard M. (2016-12-31). "Zygaenidae (Lepidoptera) in the Lepidoptera collections of the Croatian Natural History Museum". Natura Croatica: Periodicum Musei Historiae Naturalis Croatici. 25 (2): 233–248. doi:10.20302/NC.2016.25.19. eISSN 1848-7386.
