= Financial Guard =

A Financial Guard is the name of some civilian or military police forces responsible for enforcing financial laws such as taxation or customs. It may refer to:

- Financial Guard (Austria), an Austrian civilian police force under the authority of the Ministry of Finance
- Guardia di Finanza, an Italian military police force under the authority of the Minister of Economy and Finance
- Financial Guard (Romania), a former control agency, subordinated to the Romanian Ministry of Economy and Finance
- Guarda Fiscal, a former Portuguese special military force, under the authority of the Ministry of Finance
- Finanční stráž - Czechoslovak descendant of the Austro-Hungarian Financial Guard, active 1918-1939 and 1945–1949.
- Finančná stráž - Financial Guard of the Slovak Republic 1939–1945.
- Vám- és Pénzügyőrség - Hungarian Customs and Finance Guard
