= National Republican Guard (Portugal) =

National gendarmerie force of Portugal

Republican National Guard Guarda Nacional Republicana
- Coat of arms of the Guarda Nacional Republicana
- Motto: Pela Lei e Pela Grei (English: "For the Law and for the People")

Agency overview
- Formed: 1911; 115 years ago
- Employees: 22,608

Jurisdictional structure
- Operations jurisdiction: Portugal
- General nature: Gendarmerie

Operational structure
- Headquarters: Quartel do Carmo, Largo do Carmo, Lisbon, Portugal
- 38°42′45.3492″N 9°8′25.746″W
- Parent agency: Ministry of the Home Affairs (in peacetime); Ministry of National Defence (in wartime)

Notables
- Significant operation: Overseas Deployment; Angola; UNAVEM III 1995–96; MONUA 1997–99; East-Timor; UNTAET 2000–02; UNMISET 2002–03; UNOTIL 2005–07; UNMIT 2006–09; DR Congo; MONUC 2003–04; EUPOL Kinshasa 2005–09; Iraq; IRAQ FREEDOM 2003–06 (within MSU); Republic of North Macedonia; OSCE Skopje 2002–03; EUPOL 2005; Liberia; UNMIL 2004–05; Ivory Coast; UNOCI 2004–05; Haiti; UNSTAMIH 2004–05; Palestine; EUPOL 2005–08; Bosnia; EUPM 2007–; EUFOR Althea 2007–09; Italy; EUROGENDFOR 2005–11; Kosovo; EULEX 2008–09; Georgia; EUMM Georgia 2008–09>
- Awards: Officer Order of the Tower and Sword; Grand Cross Order of Christ; Member Order of Aviz; Member Order of Prince Henry; Member Order of Timor-Leste; Member Order of Liberty

The National Republican Guard (Portuguese: Guarda Nacional Republicana) or GNR is the national gendarmerie force of Portugal.

Members of the GNR are military personnel, subject to military law and organisation, unlike the agents of the civilian Public Security Police (PSP).

The GNR is responsible for the preventive police and highway patrol in 94% of Portuguese territory. At national level, GNR also has duties of customs enforcement, coastal control, nature protection, search and rescue operations and state ceremonial guards of honor.

Since the 2000s, the GNR has provided detachments for participation in international operations in Iraq, East Timor and other theatres.

As October 2023, the GNR is now partly in charge of controlling the Portuguese borders (alongside the PSP), with the dissolution of the Foreigners and Borders Service.

== Strength ==
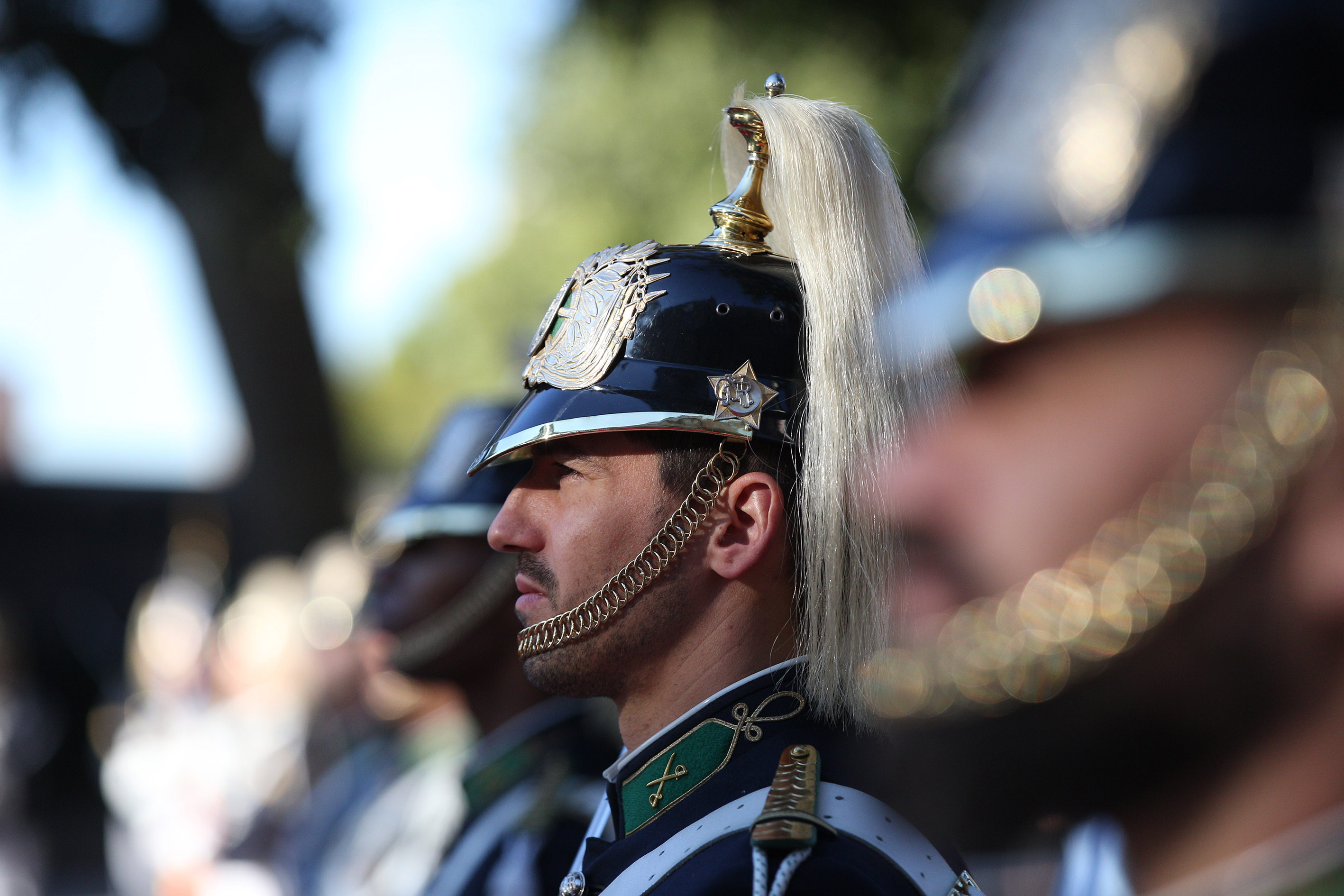

The GNR deploys over 22,608 personnel over 90 percent of Portuguese territory. The GNR are deployed in Bosnia as part of IFOR/SFOR/EUFOR Althea and 140 GNR were also deployed between 2006 and 2012 in Timor-Leste as part of UNMIT.

== Organization ==
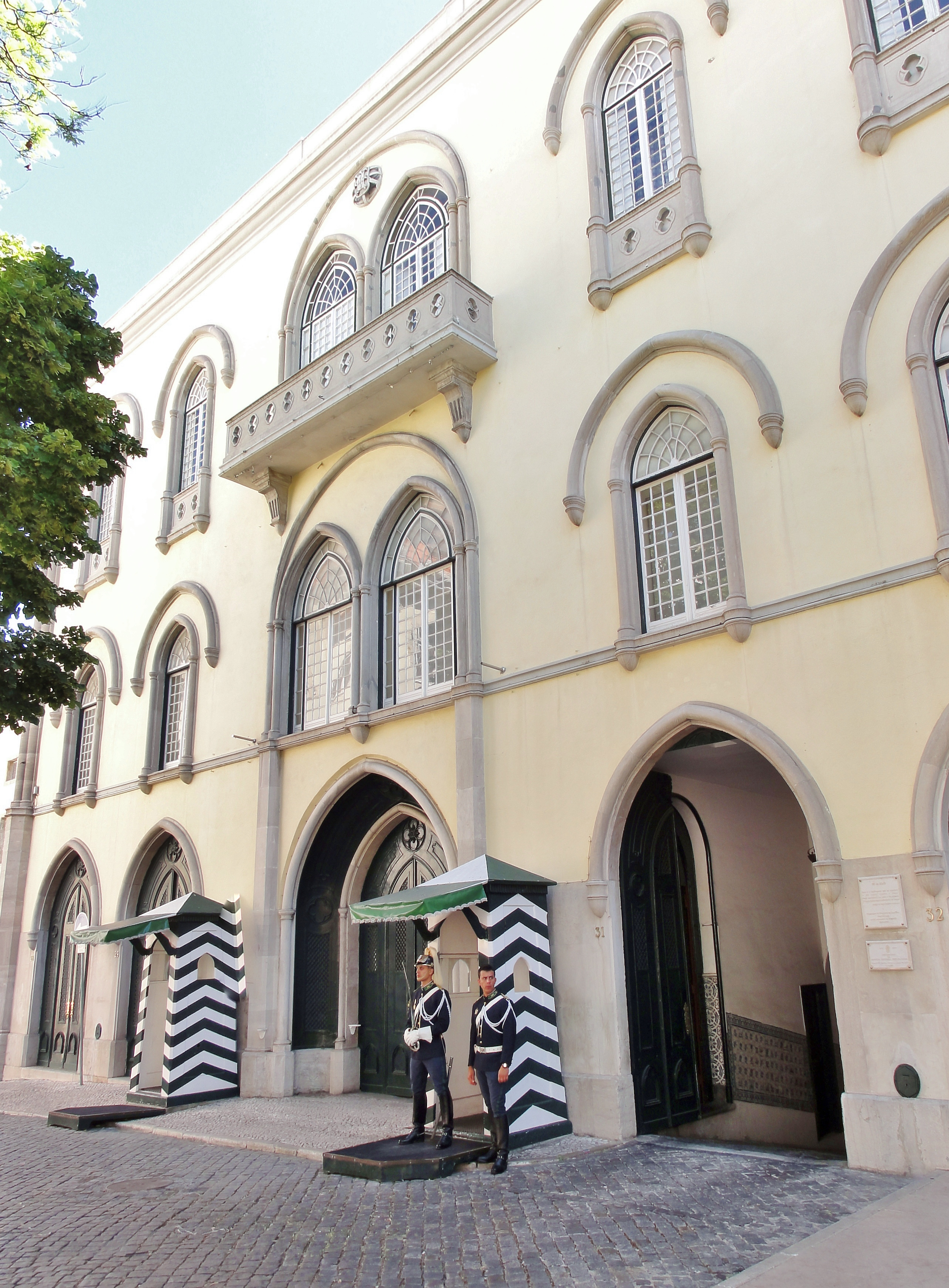
Portuguese National Republican Guard (GNR) headquarters at Largo do Carmo, Lisbon, Portugal, since 1868.

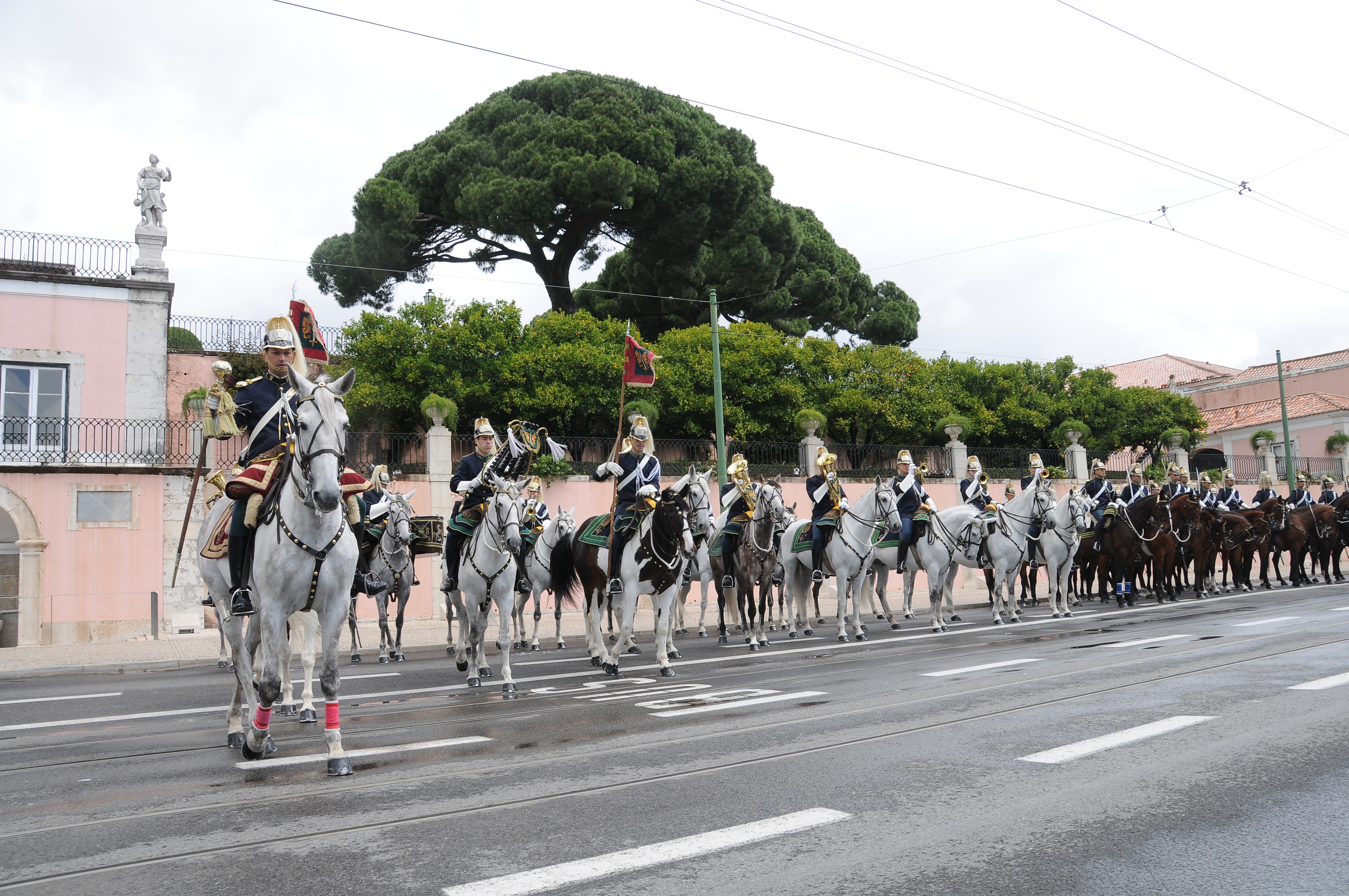
GNR cavalry at the changing of the guard of the Presidencial Palace of Belém.

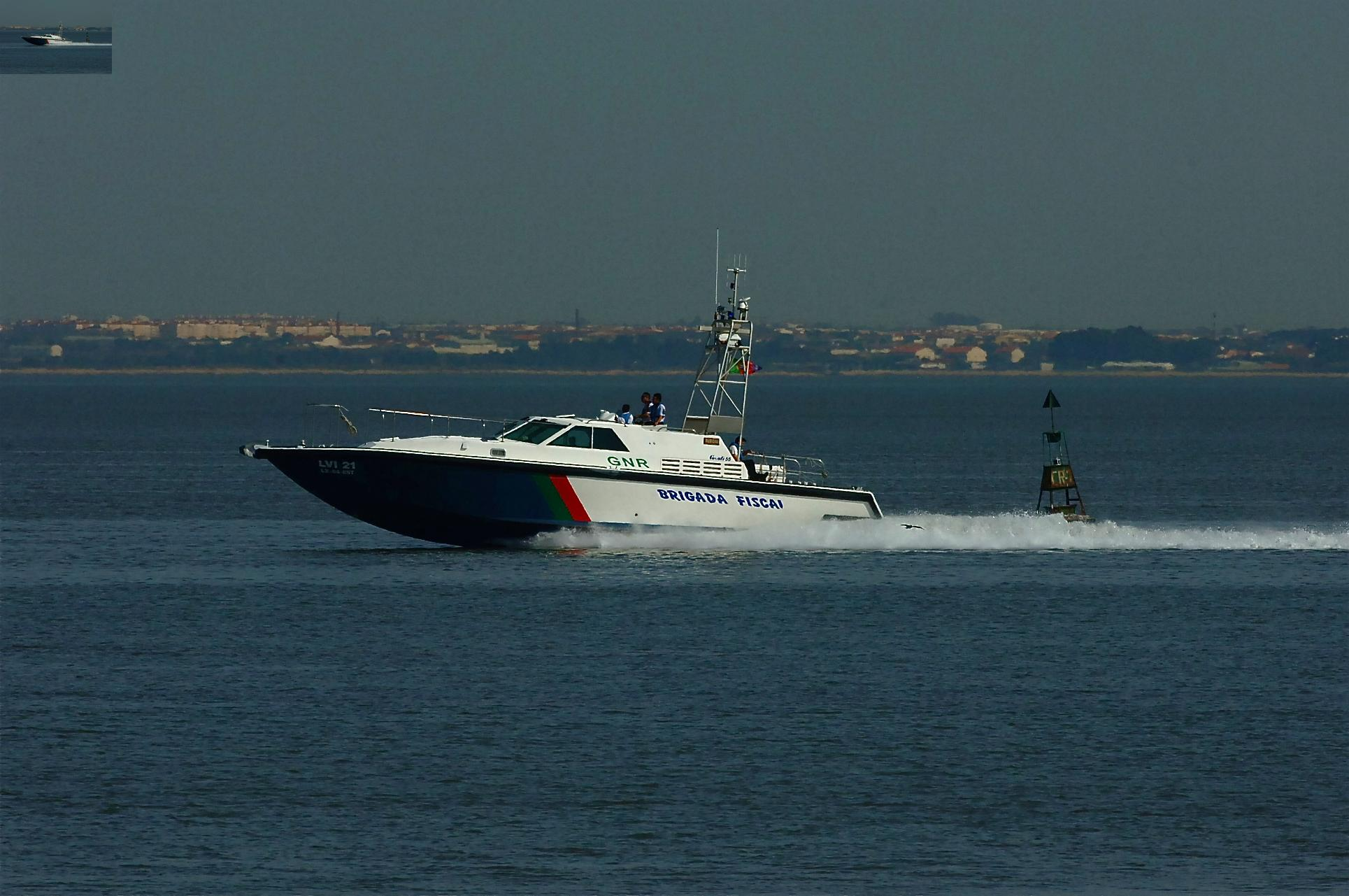
GNR Fiscal Unit patrol boat. This Unit is in charge of enforcing custom and taxation duties in the country.

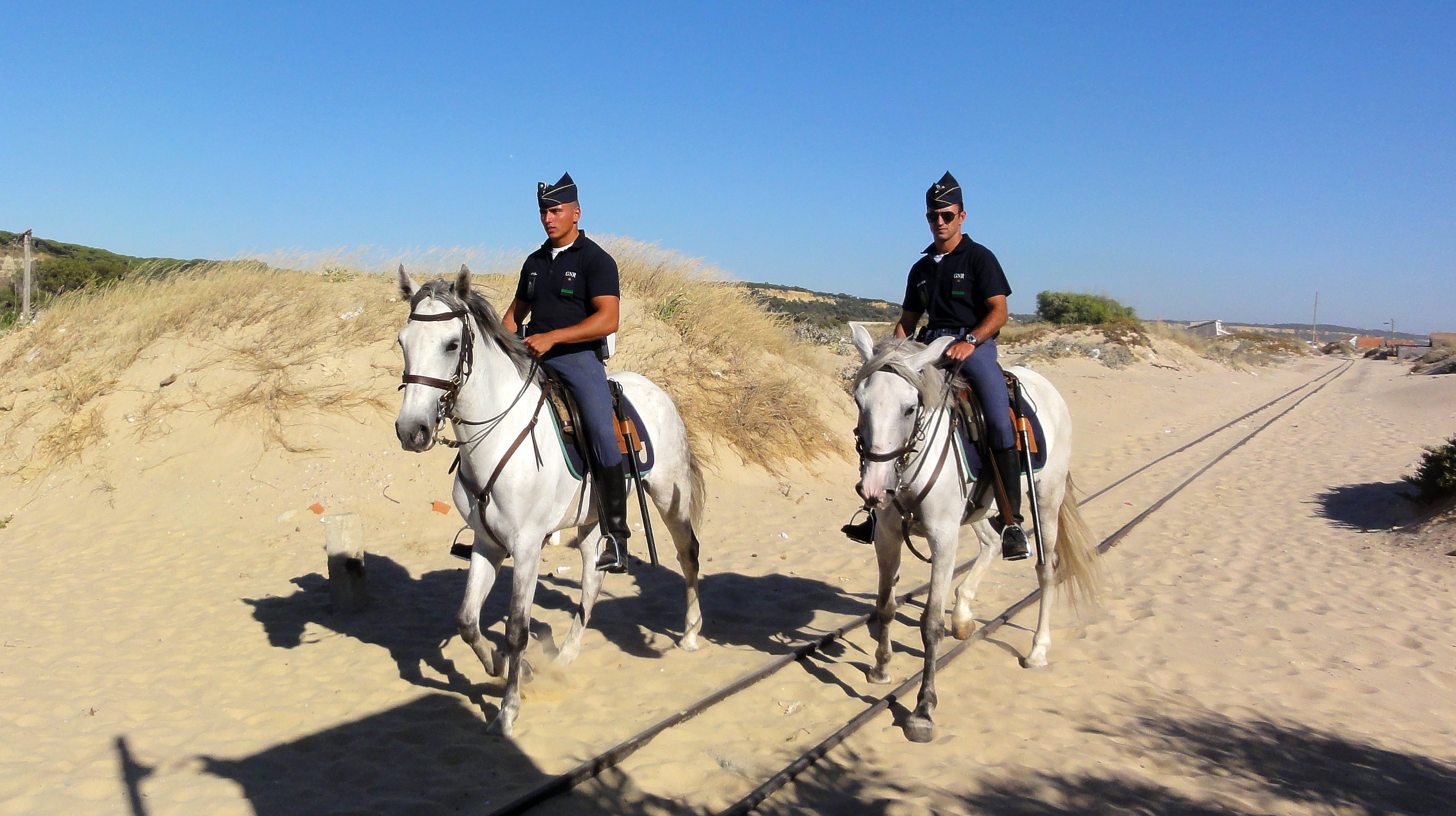
GNR cavalry patrol with horses, at Praia da Saúde (in English, Beach of Health) Costa da Caparica, next to Almada, and 15 kilometers of the Lisbon city in Portugal.

The National Republican Guard is in peacetime subordinate to the Ministry of Home Affairs for recruitment, administration, discipline and operational control and is also subordinate to the Ministry of National Defence for "uniformisation and normalisation" of military doctrine, armament and equipment. In wartime or situations of crisis, the GNR can be placed under the operational control of the Armed Forces General Staff.

Until 2007, the GNR maintained a traditional organization, whose bases still followed the organizational structure established in the early 20th century. This organization included: territorial units (four territorial brigades, that were designated "battalions" until 1993), special units (the Fiscal and the Traffic Brigades) and reserve units (the Cavalry and the Infantry regiments). The old organization also included a central structure that reflected the command of a military field division, including a military-type staff.

In 2006, the multinational consulting company Accenture made a study, requested by the Government of Portugal, that recommended the change of the organization of the Portuguese security forces, including a radical reorganization of the GNR.

Most of the recommendations regarding GNR were accepted and, in accordance with the Law No. 63/2007 (new Organic Law of the GNR), its traditional structure was replaced by a new and considerably different one, that was implemented in early 2009.

The GNR is commanded by a general officer, with the title of Commandant-General (Comandante-Geral).

The National Republican Guard now includes the following:

=== Command Headquarters and HQ Services, NRG ===
- GNR General Headquarters in Largo do Carmo, in Central Lisbon;

Reporting directly to the Commandant-General are the following:

- Direção de Justiça e Disciplina (DJD, Directorate of Justice and Discipline);
- Divisão de Planeamento Estratégico e Relações Internacionais (DPERI, Strategic Planning and International Relations Division);
- Divisão de Comunicação e Relações Públicas (DCRP, Communications and Public Relations Division);
- Comando Operacional (CO, Operational Command);
- Comando da Administração dos Recursos internos (CARI, Command of the Administration of Internal Resources);
- Comando da Doutrina e Formação (CDF, Training and Doctrine Command).

=== Territorial Units ===
The old four-brigade structure was replaced by a system of territorial commands, each covering a district or an autonomous region. Each territorial command – commanded by a colonel or lieutenant colonel – includes detachments – commanded by majors, captains or junior officer, Sub-detachments – led by junior officers – and posts – led by sergeants. Each territorial command usually includes a traffic detachment (from the former Traffic Brigade) and a detachment of intervention. The territorial commands of the Azores and Madeira play, essentially, just a coastal monitoring and fiscal actions, respectively, under the functional dependence of the UCC and UAF. The current territorial commands correspond essentially to the previous territorial groups of the old territorial brigades. With the extinction of the territorial brigades by the end of 2008, the territorial commands were placed in direct dependence on the central structure of command of GNR;

The territorial commands are as follows:

- Azores Territorial Command (Comando Territorial dos Açores)
- Aveiro Territorial Command (Comando Territorial de Aveiro)
- Beja Territorial Command (Comando Territorial de Beja)
- Braga Territorial Command (Comando Territorial de Braga)
- Bragança Territorial Command (Comando Territorial de Bragança)
- Castelo Branco Territorial Command (Comando Territorial de Castelo Branco)
- Coimbra Territorial Command (Comando Territorial de Coimbra)
- Évora Territorial Command (Comando Territorial de Évora)
- Faro Territorial Command (Comando Territorial de Faro)
- Guarda Territorial Command (Comando Territorial da Guarda)
- Leiria Territorial Command (Comando Territorial de Leiria)
- Lisbon Territorial Command (Comando Territorial de Lisboa)
- Madeira Territorial Command (Comando Territorial da Madeira)
- Portalegre Territorial Command (Comando Territorial de Portalegre)
- Porto Territorial Command (Comando Territorial do Porto)
- Santarém Territorial Command (Comando Territorial de Santarém)
- Setúbal Territorial Command (Comando Territorial de Setúbal)
- Viseu Territorial Command (Comando Territorial de Viseu)
- Viana do Castelo Territorial Command (Comando Territorial de Viana do Castelo)
- Vila Real Territorial Command (Comando Territorial de Vila Real)

=== Special Units ===
Special Units fall directly under the Operations Command (Comando Operacional).

- Coastal Control Unit (Unidade de Controlo Costeiro, UCC) – Essentially a coast guard service but without dedicated Search & Rescue and other functions, is commanded by a major-general (or a rear-admiral, if a naval officer), is responsible for surveillance and interception at sea and coast, including the operation of the Integrated Surveillance, Command and Control System (SIVICC), distributed along the Portuguese coast. This unit replaced the former Maritime Service of the Fiscal Brigade;
- Fiscal Action Unit (Unidade de Ação Fiscal, UAF) – commanded by a colonel, is responsible for carrying out the mission of taxation, tax and customs attributed to the GNR. It succeeded the previous Fiscal Brigade;
- National Transit Unit (Unidade Nacional de Trânsito, UNT) – the national Highway Patrol, is commanded by a colonel, is responsible for standardization of procedures and training under the supervision of traffic. This unit replaced the central structure of the former Traffic Brigade, losing its territorial subunits transit, which went to the dependence of the various command authorities;
- Security and State Honor Unit (Unidade de Segurança e Honras de Estado, USHE) – commanded by a major-general, is responsible for tasks of representation and security of the organs of sovereignty. Includes the Presidential Squadron (Esquadrão Presidencial), Horse Band (Charanga a Cavalo), the Guard Marching Band (Banda da Guarda), the State Honors and Security Group (Grupo de Segurança e Honras de Estado). This unit replaced the old Regimento de Cavalaria (Cavalry Regiment) and part of the old Regimento de Infantaria (Infantry Regiment);
- Intervention Unit (Unidade de Intervenção, UI) – commanded by a major-general, is responsible for the missions of maintaining and restoring public order, management of critical incidents, tactical operations, security of sensitive installations, inactivation of explosives, protection and relief and projection of forces for international missions. Includes the Public Order Intervention Group (Grupo de Intervenção de Ordem Pública, GIOP), the Special Operations Intervention Group (Grupo de Intervenção de Operações Especiais, GIOE), the Intervention Group for Protection and Rescue (Grupo de Intervenção de Proteção e Socorro, GIPS), the Canine Intervention Group (Grupo de Intervenção Cinotécnico, GIC), the Center for Ordnance Disposal and Underground Security (Centro de Inativação de Explosivos e Segurança em Subsolo, CIESS) and the International Missions Force Training and Readiness Centre (Centro de Treino e Aprontamento de Força para Missões Internacionais). This unit was organized with several subunits of the former Infantry Regiment.

=== Services ===
- Serviço de Protecção da Natureza e do Ambiente- SEPNA (Nature and Environment Protection Service)

=== Educational establishment ===
- NRG Basic School (Escola da Guarda, EG) – commanded by a major-general, is responsible for technical and professional training of military personnel of the GNR. Includes training centers in Figueira da Foz (CFFF) and Portalegre (CFP).

== History ==
The National Republican Guard is the direct descendant of the Royal Police Guard created in the beginning of the 19th century.

=== Royal Guard of the Police, 1801 ===
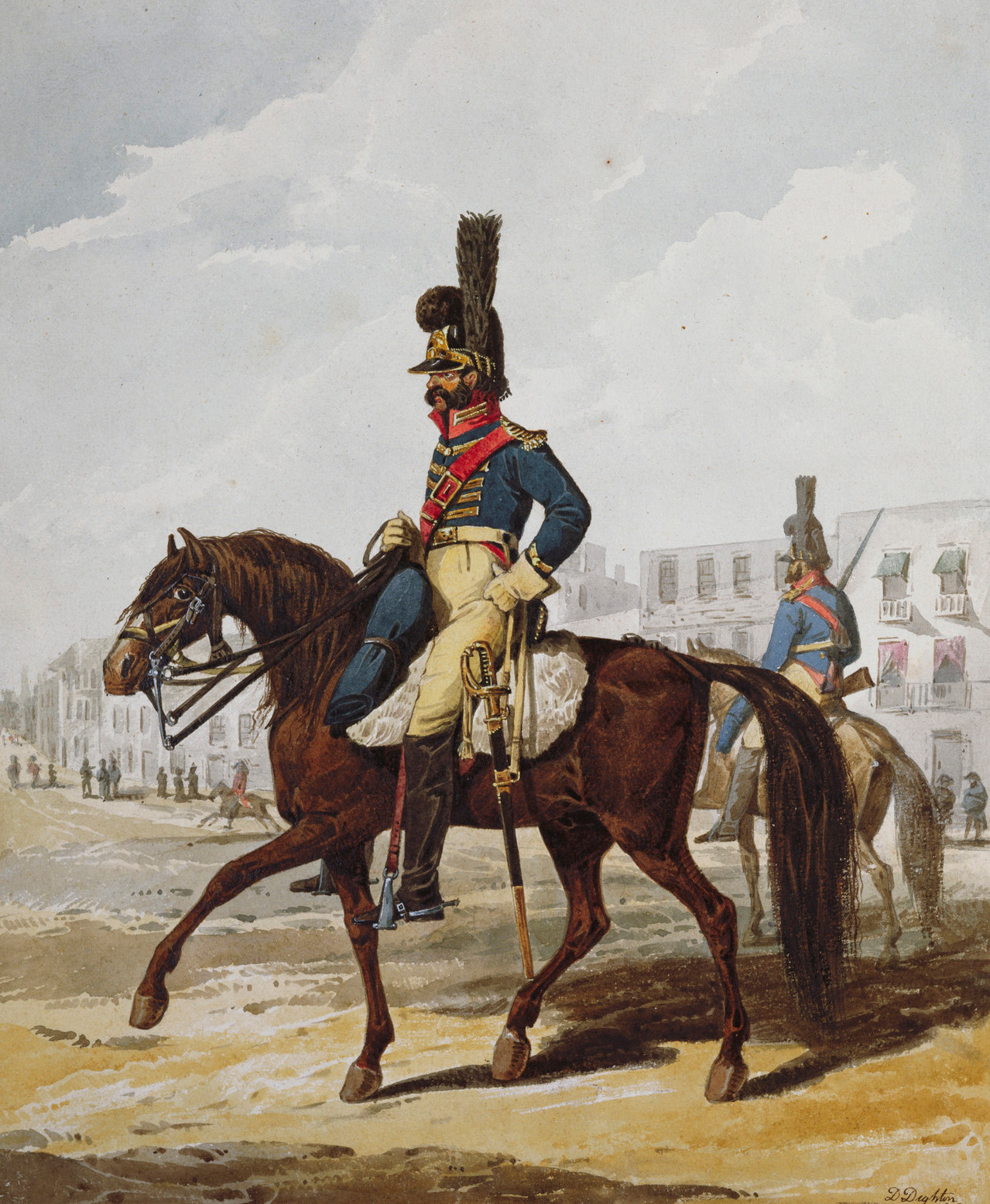
Royal Guard of the Police of Lisbon cavalry in 1812

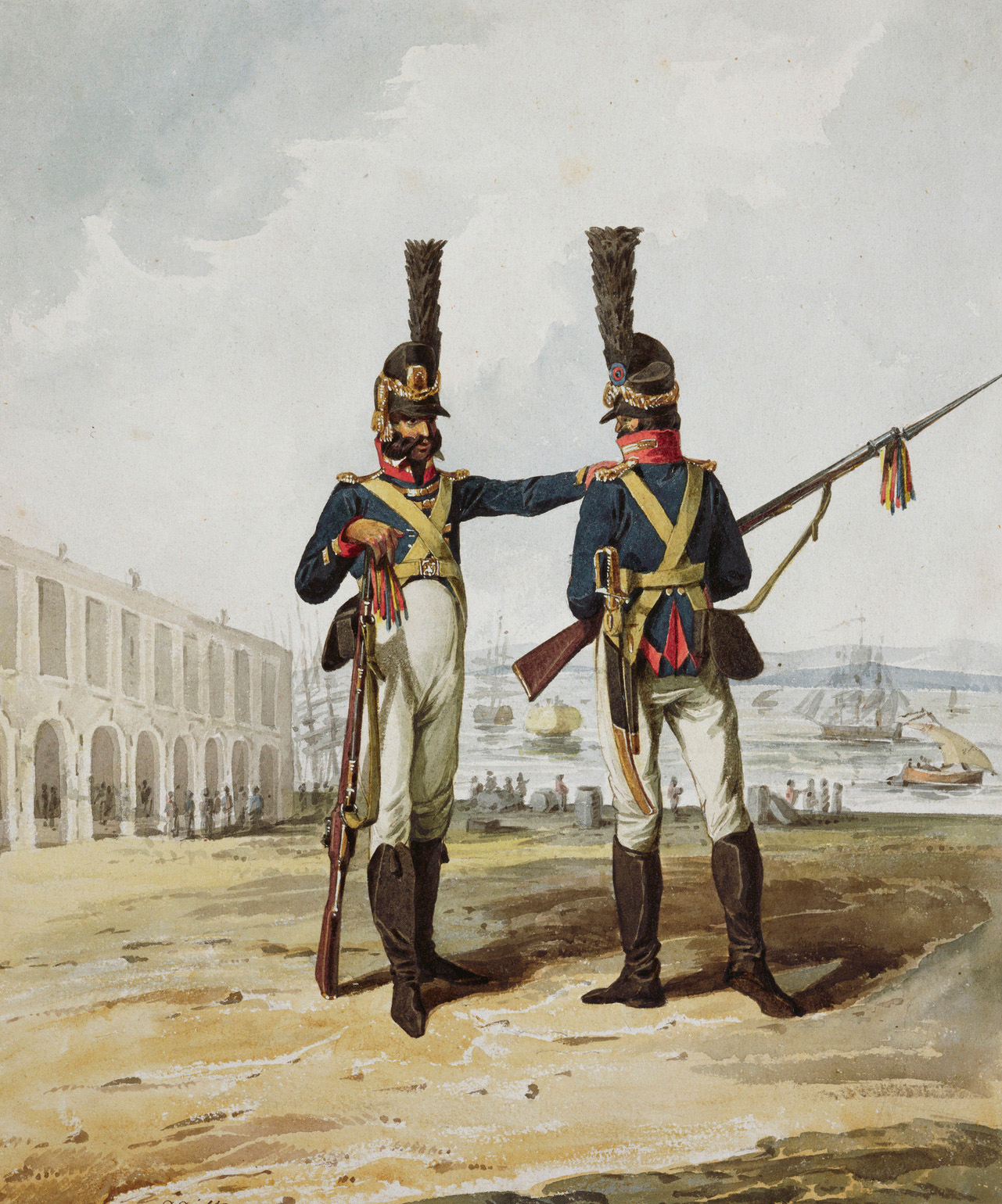
Royal Guard of the Police of Lisbon infantry in 1812

The Royal Guard of the Police of Lisbon (Guarda Real da Polícia de Lisboa) was created in 1801 by Prince Regent John on the initiative of the Intendant-General of the Police of the Court and the Kingdom, Pina Manique. It took as a model the French Gendarmerie (1791).

Following the creation of Lisbon's Royal Guard of the Police, a similar Guard was created in Porto. After the transfer of the Portuguese Court to Rio de Janeiro, after the invasion of Portugal by the Napoleonic forces in 1807, a similar Royal Guard of the Police of Rio de Janeiro was created, this being the origin of the present military police of that state and of the other member states of Brazil.

=== Municipal Guard, 1834 ===
At the end of May, 1834, as a result of the Civil War, King Peter IV, assuming the regency in name of his daughter Queen Mary II, disbanded the Royal Police Guard in Lisbon and Porto, creating the "Municipal Guards" of Lisbon and Porto on the basis of similar conditions.

In 1868 both of the Guards were put under a unified Commandant-General, installed in the Carmo Barracks in Lisbon, which today still is the Headquarters of the GNR. The Municipal Guard was considered part of the Army, but was dependent on the Ministry of Internal Affairs for all matters regarding public security.

=== Republican Guard, 1910 ===
After the 5 October 1910 revolution, which replaced the Constitutional Monarchy with the Republic, the new regime changed the name of the Municipal Guard to the Republican Guard (Guarda Republicana), keeping the same organization. At this time, plans were already underway for the transformation of this Guard into a National Republican Guard, covering all the territory of Portugal.

=== National Republican Guard, 1911 ===
In 1911, the Republican Guard was transformed in the National Republican Guard (GNR): this was to be a security force consisting of military personnel organised in a special corps of troops depending, in peace time, on the Ministry of Internal Administration, for the purpose of conscription, administration and execution with regards to its mission, and the Ministry of the National Defense for the purpose of uniformization and normalization of the military doctrine, as well as for its armament and equipment. In case of war or situation of crisis, the forces of National Republican Guard will, in terms of the respective laws and for operational effect, be subordinated to the Commander-in-Chief of the Armed Forces.

In 1993 the National Republican Guard absorbed the independent Fiscal Guard (Guarda Fiscal) that became the Fiscal Brigade of the GNR. In 2006 a new GNR unit was created with the purpose of firefighting and was named GIPS.

A unit of the GNR was deployed in Iraq during the NATO mission MNF-I within the Italian led Multinational Specialized Unit.

A small contingent of GNR forces were deployed in Timor-Leste in 2006.

== General commanders ==
=== Royal Guard of Police ===
- Jean Victor, Count of Novion (10 December 1801 – 31 August 1808)
- Filipe de Sousa Canavarro (18 October 1808 – 3 July 1813)
- Joaquim da Câmara (4 July 1813 – 10 October 1815)
- José Pereira Lacerda (12 October 1815 – 2 February 1819)
- Joaquim José Maria de Sousa Tavares (2 February 1819 – 23 March 1821)
- Bento Maria Lobo Pessanha (24 March 1821 – 4 June 1823)
- Bernardo Doutel de Almeida, Baron of Portela (7 June 1823 – 8 August 1826)
- Francisco José de Figueiredo Sarmento (9 August 1826 – 27 February 1828)
- Joaquim José Maria de Sousa Tavares (1 March 1828 – 27 October 1833)
- Manuel Teixeira Gomes (4 November 1833 – 26 May 1834)

=== Municipal Guard of Lisbon ===
- Francisco de Paula de Oliveira (18 August 1834 – 18 June 1835)
- Luís de Moura Furtado (19 June 1835 – 15 August 1836)
- Francisco Xavier António Ferreira (16 August 1836 – 10 September 1836)
- Manuel Bernardo Vidal (11 September 1836 – 26 December 1836)
- António César de Vasconcelos Correia (27 December 1836 – 11 June 1841)
- Carlos Mascarenhas (12 June 1841 – 28 May 1846)
- João Firmino de Lemos Corte Real (29 May 1846 – 24 July 1846)
- António Vieira da Fonseca (25 July 1846 – 5 October 1846)
- Carlos Mascarenhas (6 October 1846 – 16 May 1851)
- Fernando da Fonseca Mesquita e Sola, 1st Viscount of Francos (17 May 1851 – 28 August 1856)
- Cristóvão José Franco Bravo (29 August 1856 – 26 December 1861)
- José de Vasconcelos Correia (27 December 1861 – 23 December 1868)

=== Municipal Guard ===
- José de Vasconcelos Correia (24 December 1868 – 22 September 1869)
- Henrique de Almeida Girão (23 September 1869 – 19 June 1870)
- Joaquim Bento Pereira (20 June 1870 – 19 September 1875)
- João Pedro Schwalbach (22 December 1875 – 9 May 1878)
- Luís Augusto de Almeida Macedo (11 March 1878 – 5 May 1884)
- José Joaquim Henriques Moreira (6 May 1884 – 11 January 1893)
- José Maria Smith Barruncho (12 January 1893 – 12 March 1893)
- António Abranches de Queirós (13 March 1893 – 1 March 1902)
- Filipe Malaquias de Lemos (3 March 1902 – 4 October 1910)

=== Republican Guard ===
- Ernesto da Encarnação Ribeiro (12 October 1910 – 2 May 1911)

=== National Republican Guard ===
- Ernesto da Encarnação Ribeiro (3 May 1911 – 31 March 1915)
- António de Carvalho (2 June 1915 – 29 February 1916)
- António Barreto (1 March 1916 – 11 December 1917)
- José Oliveira Duque (12 December 1917 – 19 June 1918)
- António de Andrade (11 February 1919 – 16 March 1919)
- Josué Mendonça e Matos (17 March 1919 – 12 January 1920)
- João Pedroso de Lima (23 February 1920 – 8 March 1921)
- António Correia Barreto (9 March 1921 – 10 May 1921)
- Vitoriano José César (11 May 1921 – 24 May 1921)
- Bernardo de Faria e Silva (25 May 1921 – 25 September 1921)
- Abel Hipólito (26 September 1921 – 19 October 1921)
- Ernesto Vieira da Rocha (20 October 1921 – 31 May 1926)
- Júlio Schiappa de Azevedo (14 June 1926 – 19 June 1926)
- Eduardo Augusto Lopes Valadas (20 June 1926 – 20 March 1927)
- Augusto Manuel Farinha Beirão (23 March 1927 – 22 July 1939)
- João de Azevedo Monteiro de Barros (6 September 1939 – 2 February 1943)
- Carlos Maria Ramires (19 February 1943 – 18 May 1945)
- Afonso Talaia Lapa de Sousa Botelho (22 May 1945 – 9 August 1957)
- Aníbal Ferreira Vaz (5 September 1957 – 18 May 1961)
- Francisco Holbeche Fino (19 May 1961 – 6 December 1961)
- Avelino Barbieri e Figueiredo Baptista Cardoso (7 December 1961 – 29 January 1965)
- Raul Pereira de Castro (30 January 1965 – 30 June 1970)
- Adriano Augusto Pires (1 July 1970 – 25 April 1974)

== Awards and decorations ==
1921: Awarded an exceptional move, the 3rd Battalion of the Fiscal Guard degree of Officer of the Order of the Tower and of the Sword, of Valour, Loyalty and Merit (by the action of this Battalion in Republican Revolt 31 January 1891, in the city. Porto).
1934: Order of the Tower and of the Sword, of Valour, Loyalty and Merit to the National Guard.
1965: Grand Cross of the Order of Christ the National Guard.
1984: Praise the Minister of Internal Affairs to the National Guard.
1985: Order of the Tower and of the Sword, of Valour, Loyalty and Merit the Fiscal Guard.
1986: Honorary Member of the Military Order of Aviz the National Guard.
1988: Order of Christ the Fiscal Guard.
1990: Municipal Merit Medal, gold grade, Mayor of Lisbon, the Fiscal Guard.
1993: Medal Ensign Joaquim José da Silva Xavier, the Federal Military Police of the Brasilia National Guard.
1994: Gold Medal for Distinguished Service to the Public Safety Fiscal Guard.
2004: Praise the Minister of Internal Affairs to the National Guard.
2005: Distinguished Service, with palm, the Subassemblies ALFA GNR (mission in Iraq).
2006: Praise from the President to the Presidential Squadron, Cavalry Regiment of the GNR.
2006: title of honorary member of the Order of Prince Henry the Symphonic Band of the GNR.
2006: title of honorary member of the Order of Prince Henry the Cavalry Regiment of the GNR.
2008: Praise and gold medal for distinguished services, granted by the Minister of Internal Affairs, the Units of extinct GNR, namely: Territorial Brigade Nos. 2, 3, 4 and 5, Brigade Tax, Traffic Brigade, Infantry Regiment, and Cavalry.
2010: Praise the Minister of Internal Affairs to the National Guard.
2010: Title of honorary member of the Order of Prince Henry the National Guard.
2010: Order of Timor-Leste National Guard.
2011: Praise the Minister of Internal Affairs to the National Guard.
2011: Honorary Member of the Order of Liberty National Guard.

== Ranks ==
=== Officers ===
NATO code	OF-10	OF-9	OF-8		OF-7	OF-6	OF-5	OF-4	OF-3	OF-2	OF-1
National Republican Guard
National Republican Guard			Tenente-general; Comandante-general	Tenente-general	Major-general		Coronel	Tenente-coronel	Major	Capitão	Tenente	Alferes

=== Non-commissioned officers and enlisted ===
NATO code	OR-9		OR-8	OR-7	OR-6	OR-5	OR-4		OR-3	OR-2		OR-1
(Portugal) National Republican Guard
(Portugal) National Republican Guard	Sargento-mor	Sargento-chefe	Sargento-ajudante	Primeiro-sargento	Segundo-sargento	Furriel	Cabo-mor	Cabo-chefe	Cabo-de-curso	Cabo	Guarda principal	Guarda

== Equipment ==
=== Armament ===
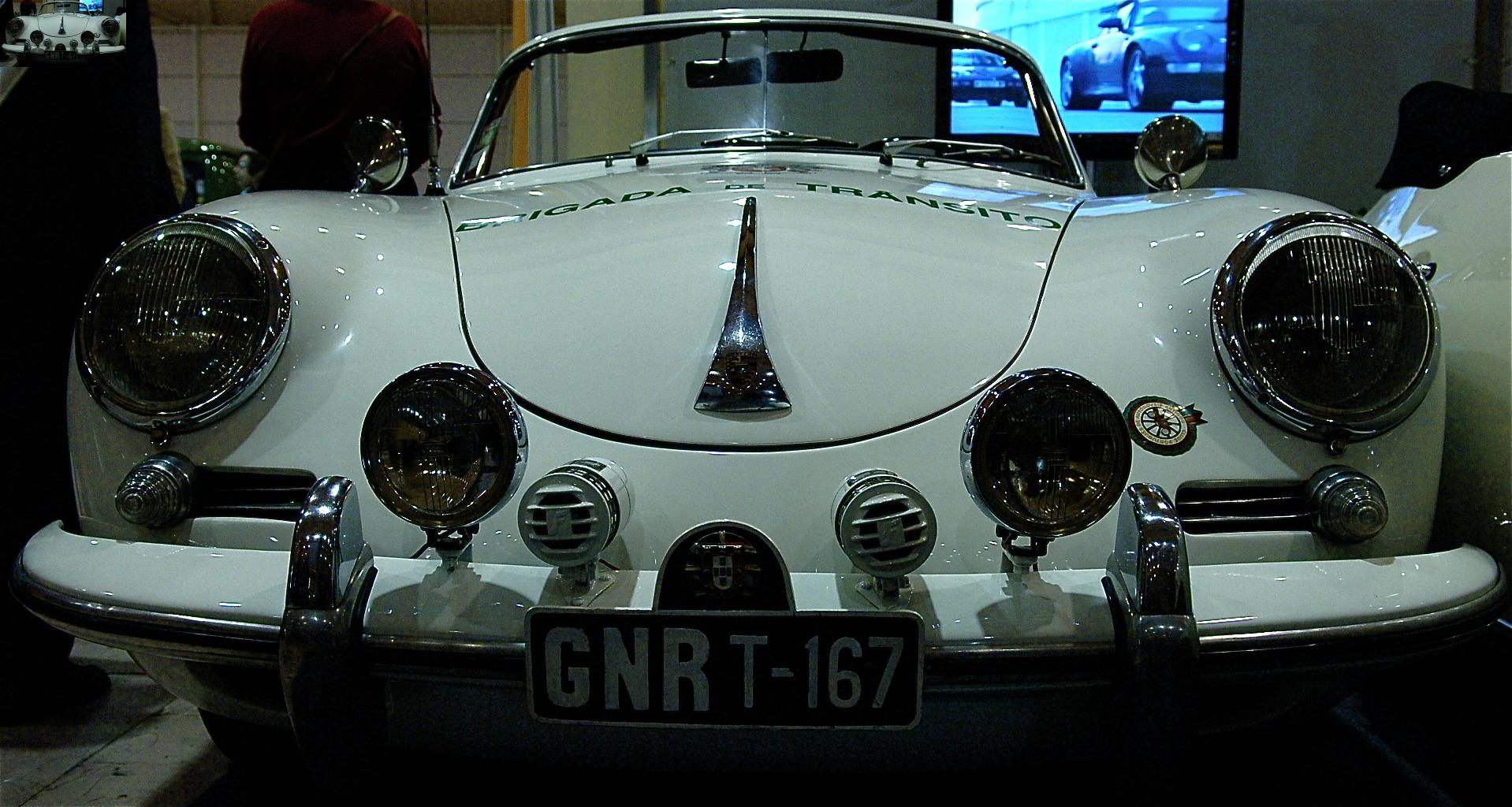
Former GNR highway patrol Porsche.

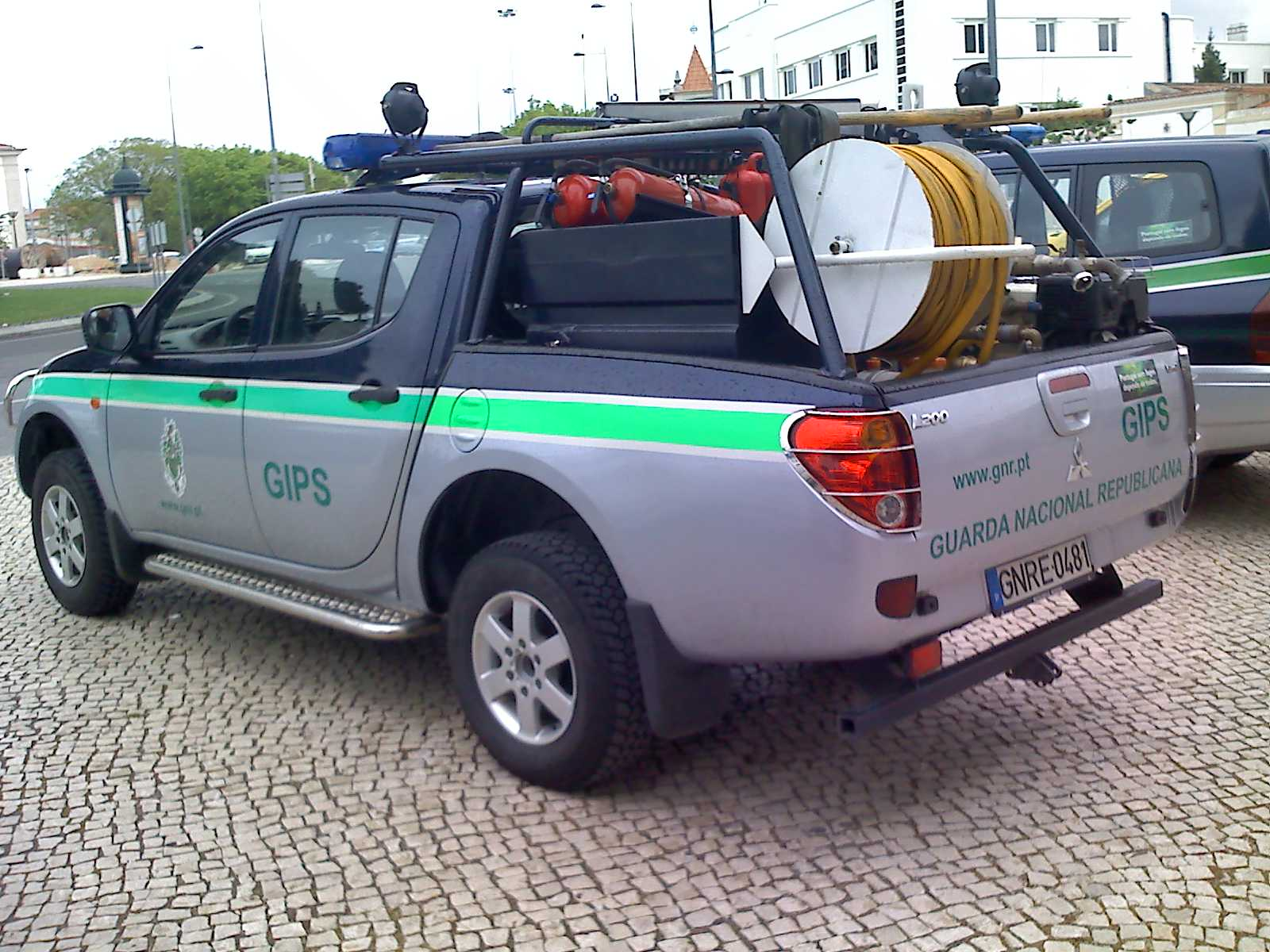
GNR forest rescue vehicle.

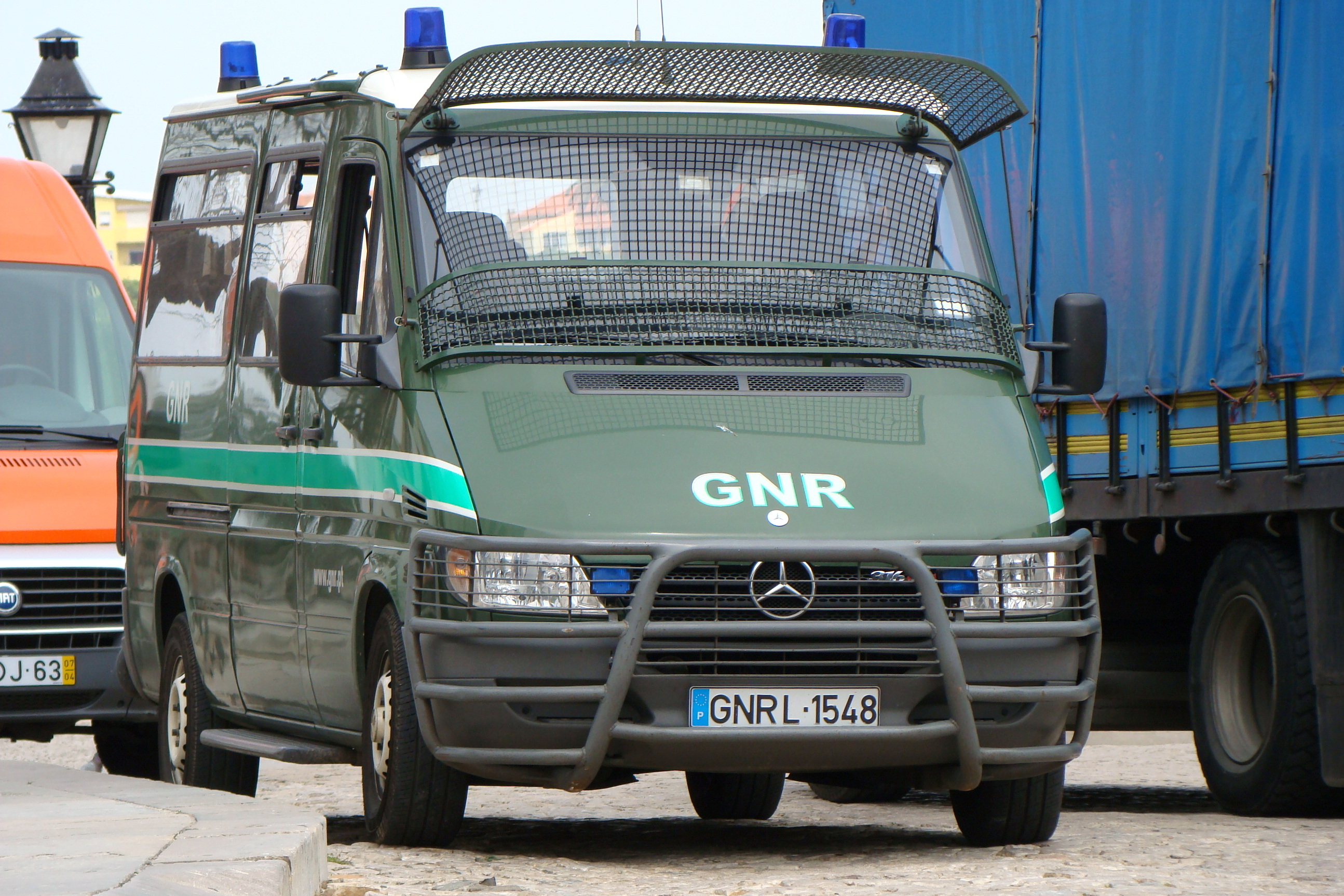
Mercedes-Benz Sprinter

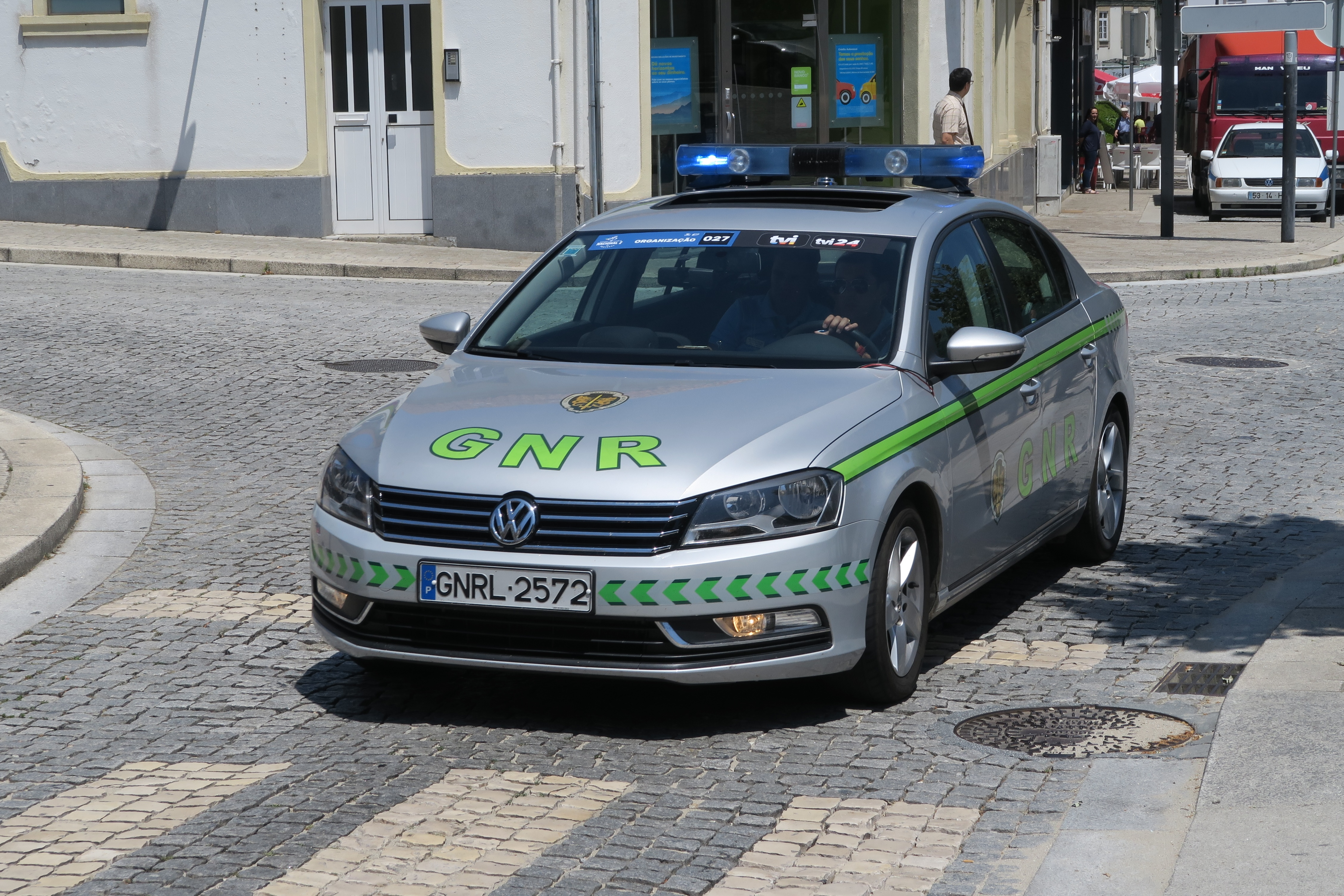
GNR patrol car (Volkswagen Passat)

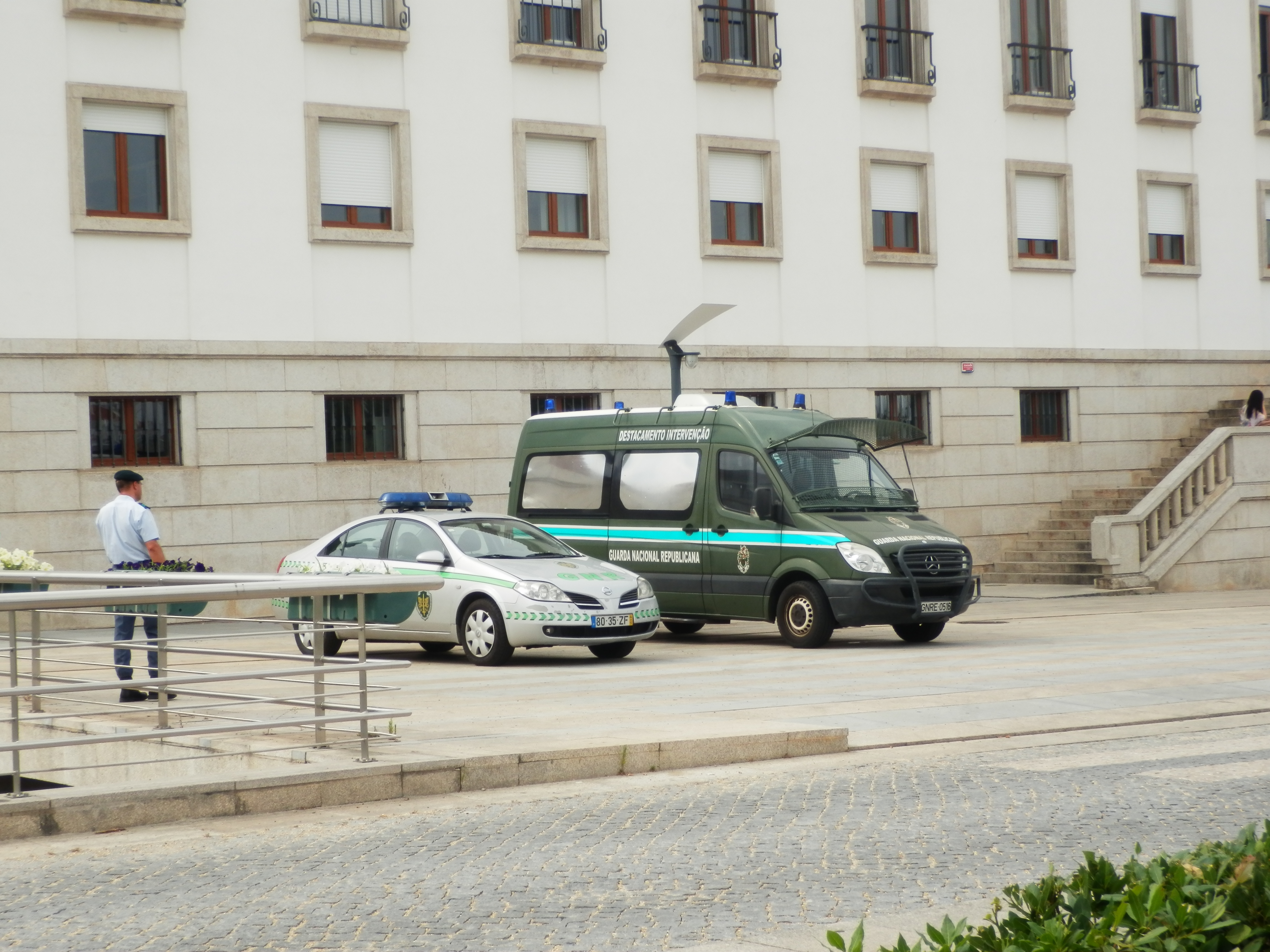
GNR patrol car (Nissan Almera) and GNR van (Mercedes-Benz Sprinter)

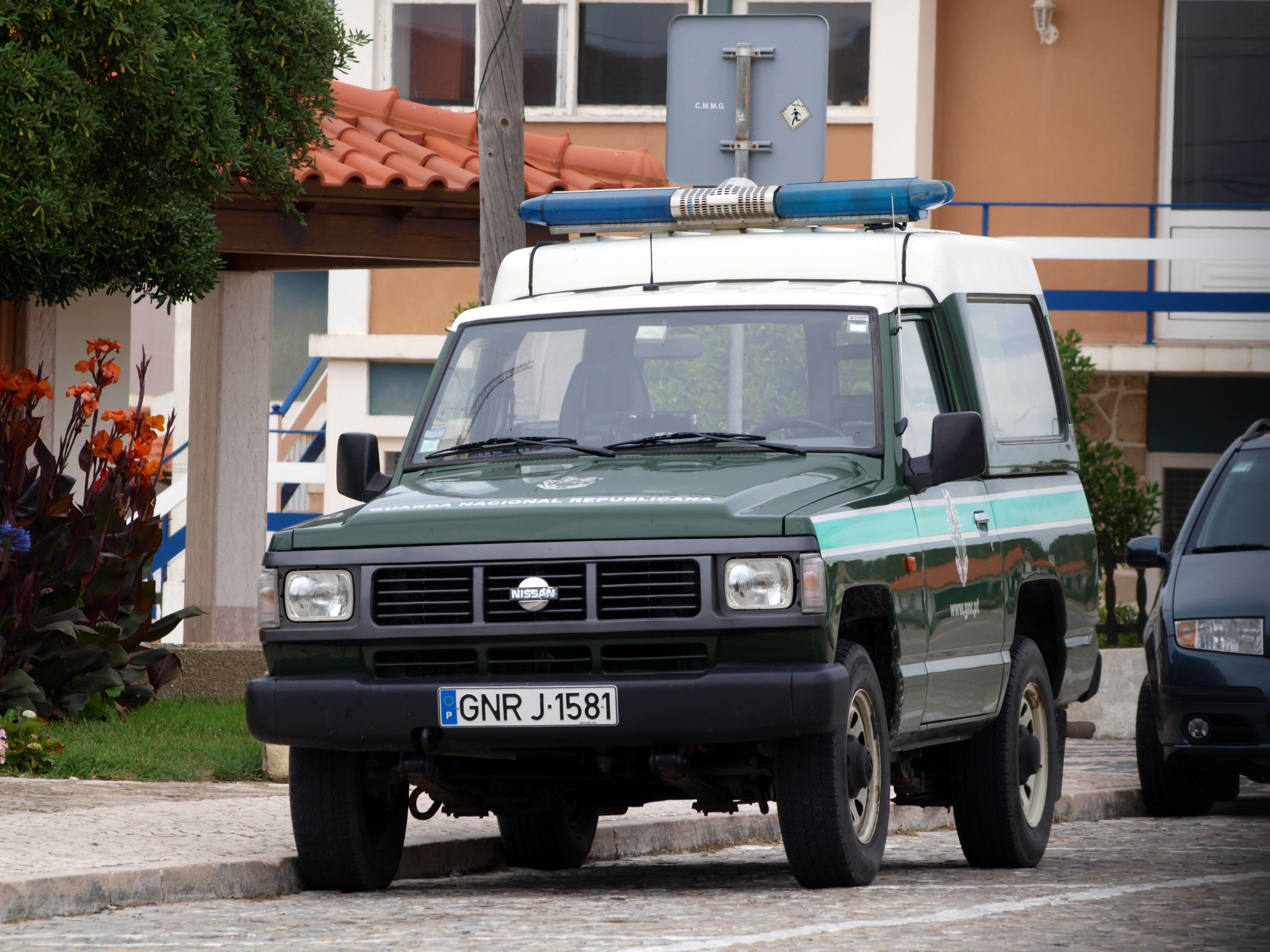
GNR Nissan Patrol

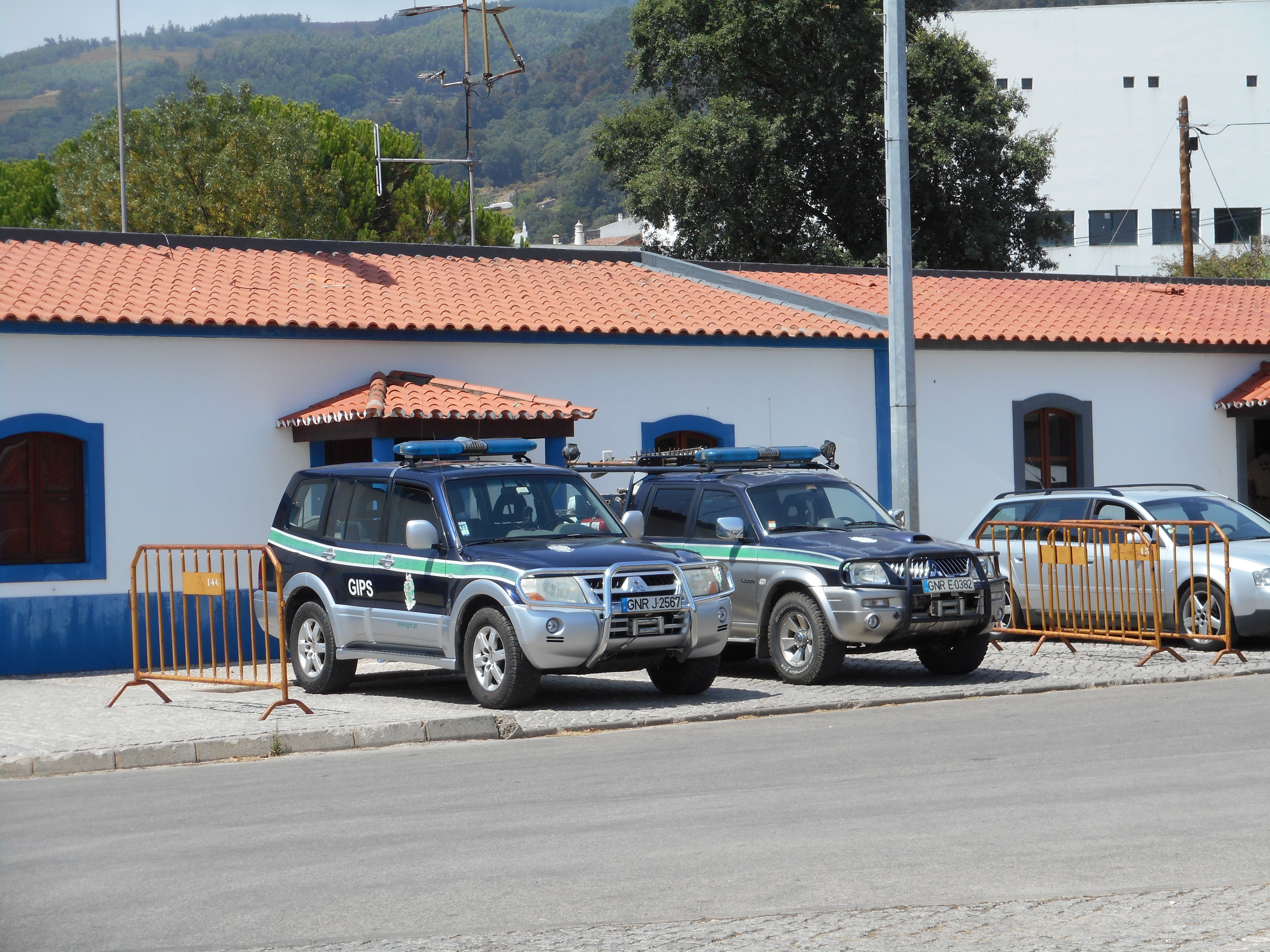
GNR forest rescue vehicles (Mitsubishi Pajero and Mitsubishi L200)

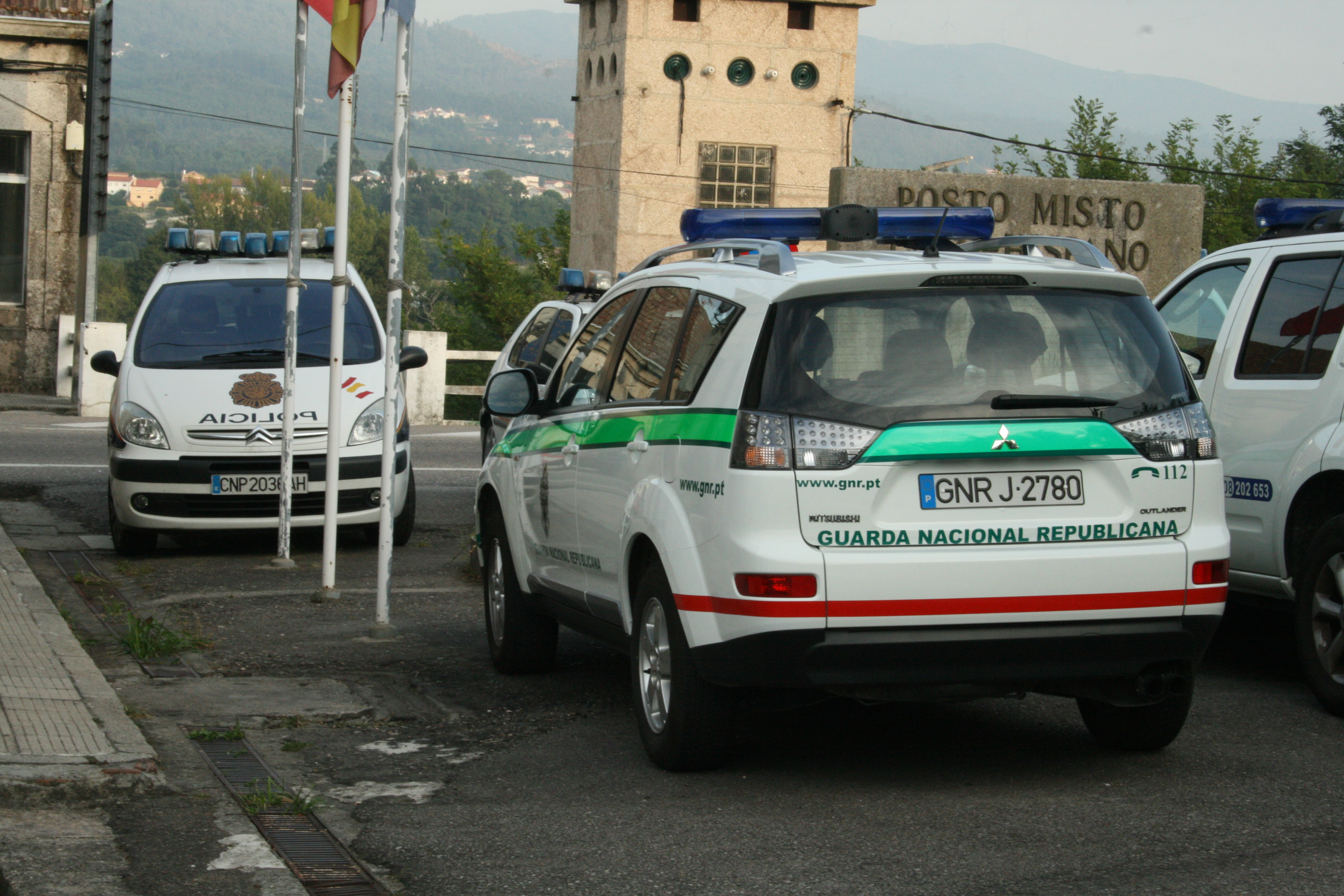
GNR Mitsubishi Outlander

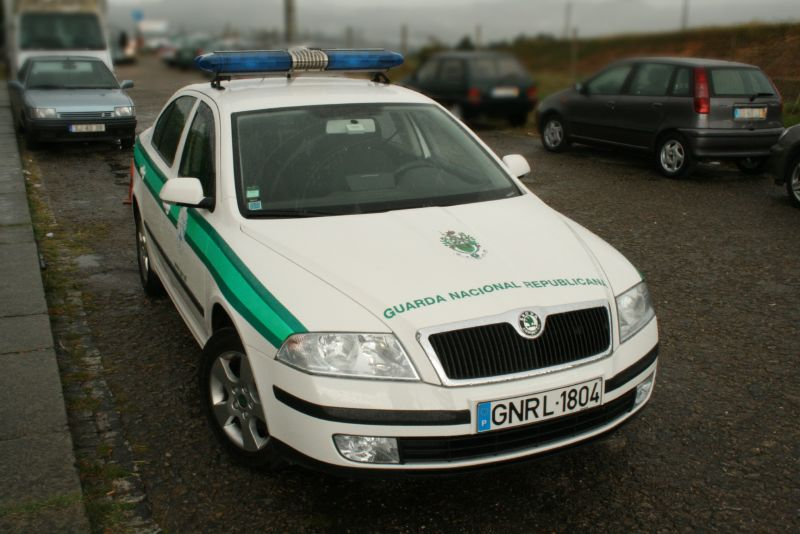
GNR patrol car (Škoda Octavia)

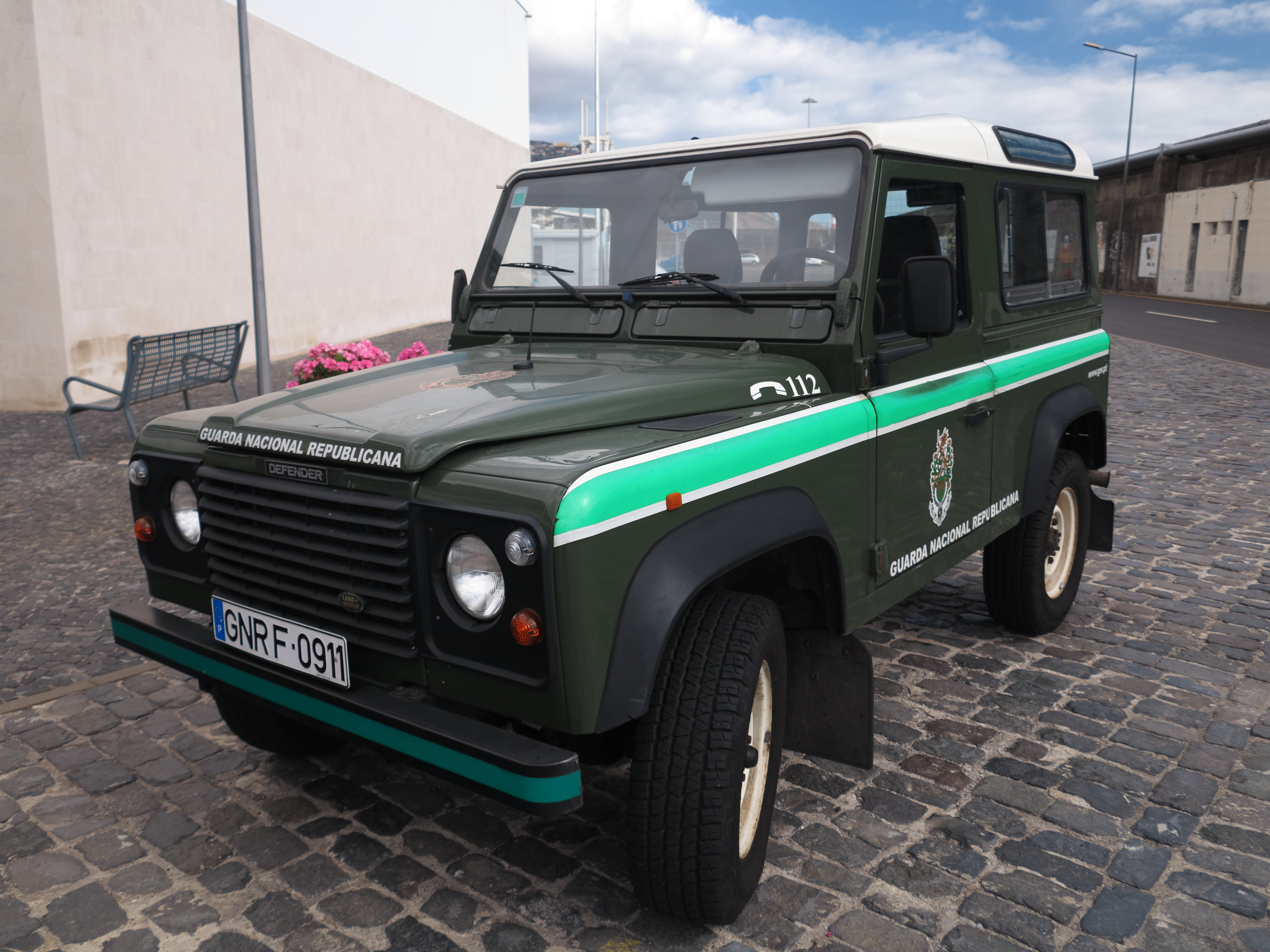
GNR Land Rover Defender

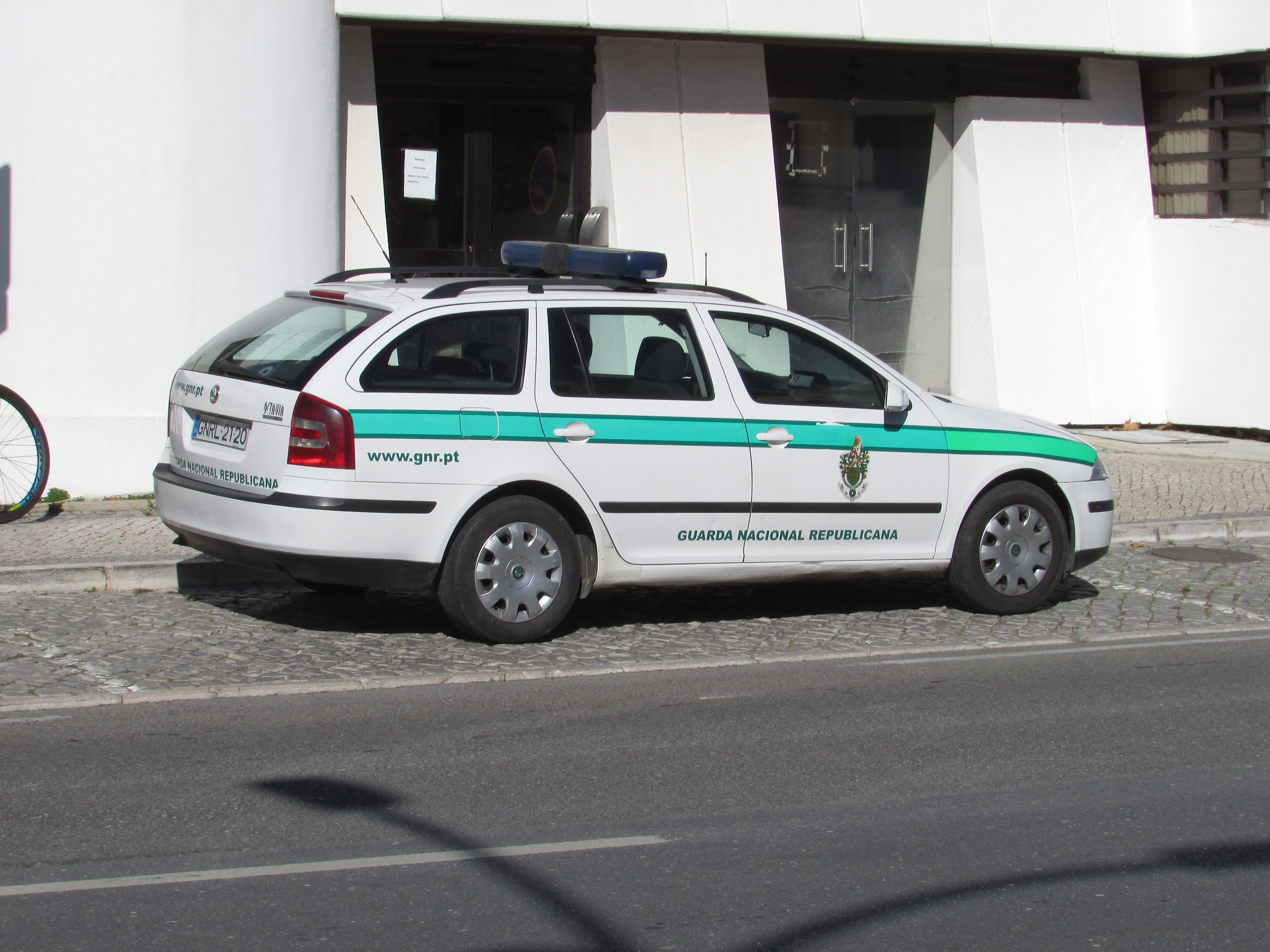
GNR Škoda Octavia

Police services in Portugal have always used a wide range of firearms in 9×19mm to equip their personnel.

Weapon	Origin	Type
ASP Street Defender	USA	Standard issue pepper spray
ASI 2000	USA	Standard issue pepper spray
Taser X26	USA	Less lethal electroshock weapon
Glock 19	Austria	Standard issue sidearm
Glock 17	Austria	Sidearm for special operations
Heckler & Koch USP Compact	Germany	Sidearm for special operations
SIG Sauer SP 2022	Germany	Sidearm for special operations
Walther P99	Germany	Sidearm for special operations
Desert Eagle	Israel	Sidearm for special operations, chambered in .357 Magnum
Heckler & Koch MP5	Germany	Submachine gun
Heckler & Koch MP7	Germany	Submachine gun
HK UMP45	Germany	Submachine gun
Brügger & Thomet MP9	Switzerland	Submachine gun
Fabarm SDASS Tactical	Italy	Shotgun
Benelli M3	Italy	Shotgun
Benelli M4	Italy	Shotgun
H&K G3A3	Germany	Assault rifle
HK G36	Germany	Assault rifle
H&K 416A5	Germany	Assault rifle
H&K 417A2	Germany	Assault rifle
H&K G28	Germany	Assault rifle
Brügger & Thomet APR	Switzerland	Sniper rifle
MSG-90	Germany	Sniper rifle
Accuracy International AW50	UK	Sniper rifle
Heckler & Koch MG4	Germany	Machine gun for special operations
FN MAG	Belgium	Machine gun for special operations
Browning M2	USA	Machine gun for special operations
H&K GMG	Germany	Less lethal launcher
Heckler & Koch AG36	Germany	Less lethal launcher
Flash-ball	France	Less lethal launcher
Cougar 56mm	France	Less lethal launcher

Retired sidearms

Weapon	Origin
Walther PP	Nazi Germany
Walther P38	Nazi Germany
Browning Hi-Power	Belgium
Heckler & Koch P9S	Germany
Heckler & Koch VP70M	Germany
SIG Sauer P226	Germany
Walther P5	Germany
Star Model B	Spain

=== Vehicles ===
Patrol cars

- Audi A4 B8 3.0 V6 (unmarked cars, highway patrol)
- Audi TTS 8S and Audi TT 8N (highway patrol)
- BMW 535d (unmarked cars, highway patrol)
- BMW 5 Series (F10) (1 unit, special vehicle)
- Citroën C-Elysée (527 units)
- Lexus IS 220d (unmarked cars, highway patrol)
- Mitsubishi Lancer
- Nissan Almera
- Nissan GT-R (1 unit, special vehicle)
- Porsche 911
- Porsche Panamera
- Skoda Octavia (hundreds of units)
- Škoda Superb (99 units)
- Subaru Impreza STI (some unmarked cars, highway patrol)
- Toyota Avensis (hundreds of units)
- Toyota Corolla
- Toyota Yaris
- Volkswagen Golf GTI Mk5
- Volkswagen ID.3
- Volkswagen Passat (hundreds of units)
- Volkswagen Sharan

Patrol jeeps

- Audi Q7 (1 unit, special operations)
- BMW X6 (1 unit, special operations)
- Dacia Duster
- Land Rover Defender (hundreds of units)
- Mitsubishi L200
- Mitsubishi Outlander
- Mitsubishi Pajero
- Nissan Navara
- Nissan Patrol (hundreds of units)
- Toyota Hilux 2.4D
- Toyota Land Cruiser KDJ150L 3.0 D-4D (2 units, Serra da Estrela rescue unit)

Motorcycles

- BMW G310 GS
- Honda ST1300
- Yamaha FJR1300

Vans, trucks and buses

- Citroën Berlingo 1.6 BlueHDI 100cv (K-9 units)
- Citroen Jumper 33 BlueHDi 130
- Fiat Ducato 2.3 Multijet 130cv (mobile station)
- Volkswagen Crafter (1 unit, with coast radar)
- Iveco Daily 50C18 (Command Post)
- Iveco EuroCargo ML75E16 tow truck (4 units)
- Iveco EuroCargo ML150E28 WM (8 units, with coast radar)
- Iveco Eurotech 6x6 tow truck (3 units)
- Iveco Trakker 330E5 (HAZMAT units)
- MAN TGM 13.290 4×4 BB
- MAN TGS 35.460 8×8 BB
- Mercedes-Benz Sprinter
- Mercedes-Benz Vito
- Mitsubishi Fuso Canter FE74B 4×4
- Scania P230 (1 unit)
- Renault Kangoo
- Renault Trafic (60 units)

Armoured and water cannon vehicles

- Iveco VM 90P Protetto (21 units, special operations)
- MAN TGM 18.290 4X2 BL (1 unit)

Others

- Manitou MT625H Forklift
- MAN 18.370 HOCLA-II Bus
- Polaris RZR

=== Boats ===
- Bojador-class offshore surveillance (1 unit)
- Ribamar-class surveillance and interception boats (12 units)
- Cassiopeia-class surveillance and interception boats (4 units)
- Zodíaco-class inland waters control boats (8 units)
- High Speed Speedboat (5 units)

=== Unmanned aerial vehicle ===
- Tekever AR3
- Tekever AR4 Light Ray
- UAVision SPYRO

== See also ==
- Polícia de Segurança Pública – Portuguese police force
- Polícia Judiciária – Portuguese criminal investigation police
- Serviço de Estrangeiros e Fronteiras – Portuguese border and immigration police
