= List of police operations in Martim Moniz =

Police Operations in Martim Moniz
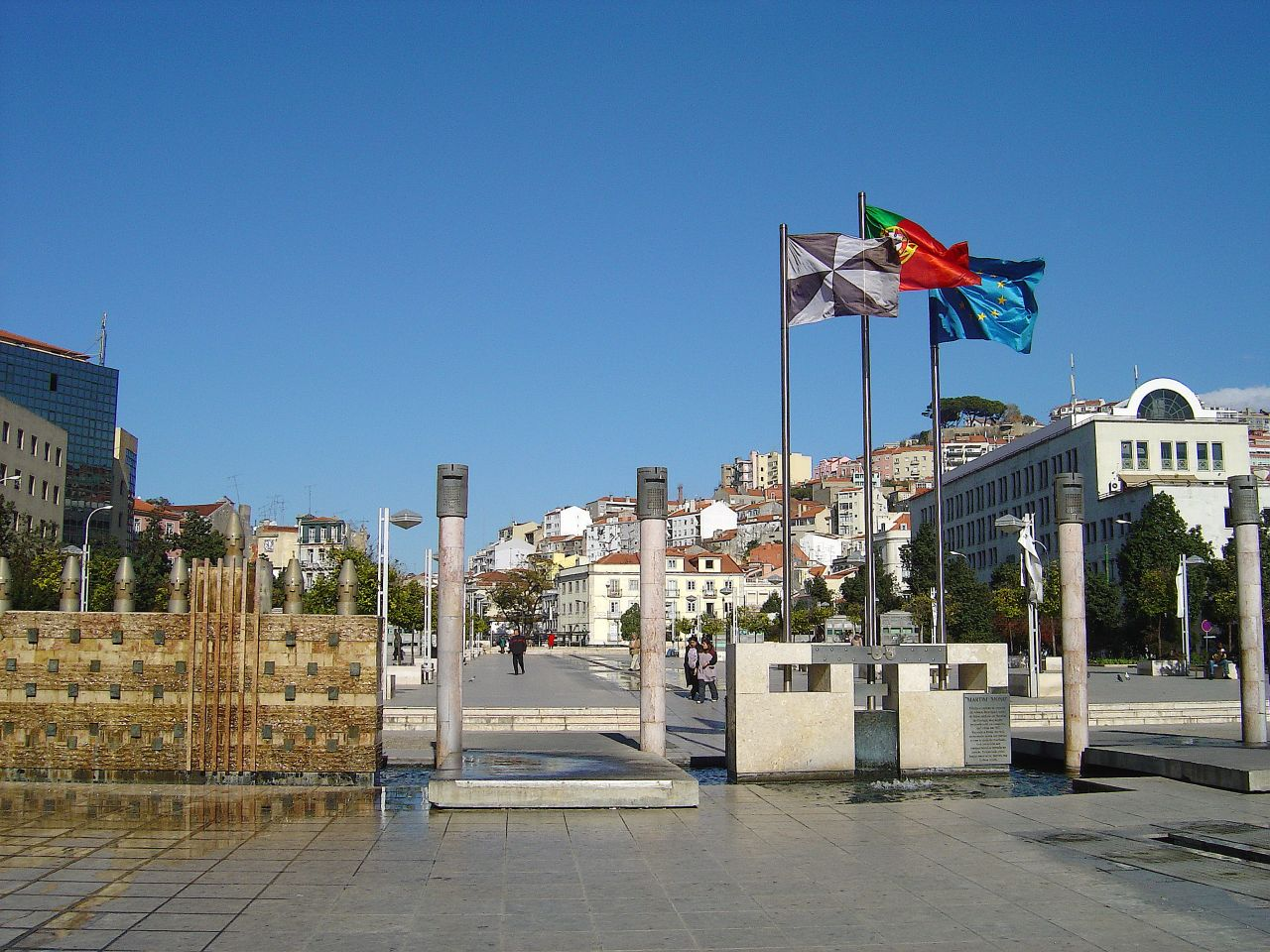
- Martim Moniz, Lisbon
- Native name: Operações Policiais no Martim Moniz
- English name: Police Operations in Martim Moniz
- Date: February 13, 2007; 19 years ago – present
- Duration: Ongoing (2007–2024)
- Venue: Martim Moniz, Lisbon, Portugal
- Location: Martim Moniz, Lisbon
- Type: Law enforcement operations
- Theme: Crime prevention and public safety
- Cause: Reports of illegal activities and public complaints
- Motive: Combatting drug trafficking, illegal immigration, theft, vandalism, and public disturbances
- Target: Illegal activities and immigration control
- Perpetrators: Various individuals and groups
- Organised by: PSP; Polícia Judiciária; SEF; Inspecção Tributária; ASAE
- Participants: Law enforcement agencies, local residents
- Outcome: Multiple arrests, contraband seized, recurring public criticism
- Arrests: Many
- Charges: Drug trafficking, selling counterfeit goods, illegal immigration
- Operations are conducted regularly in response to recurring issues in the area.

This is a list of police operations in Martim Moniz from 2007 to December 2024.

== List of operations ==
=== February 13, 2007 ===
On February 13, 2007, a major operation in Martim Moniz led to the detention of 29 individuals. The police conducted street checks, requiring anyone passing through the area to present identification. The focus was on controlling illegal immigration and verifying the legality of commercial activities.

=== April 10, 2008 ===
On April 10, 2008, an operation spanned from Martim Moniz to Alameda. While numerous individuals were identified, no arrests were made.

=== November 26, 2008 ===
Just seven months later, another operation led to no arrests but resulted in the seizure of counterfeit perfumes, belts, and clothing from local businesses.

=== December 10, 2010 ===
On December 10, 2010, a joint operation was carried out by the PSP, SEF, the Inspecção Tributária and the ASAE. Starting at 15:00 and lasting three hours, the operation targeted the Mouraria and Martim Moniz shopping centers, as well as nearby public spaces, including the Mouraria Esplanade and establishments in Martim Moniz Square. The raid resulted in five arrests and 1535 suspects caught. The operation included isolating the commercial center, blocking metro access, and cutting off local traffic. The focus was to restrain illegal activities and improving public safety.

The Mouraria Shopping Center, in particular, has faced several police inspections over the years, as described by Paulo Afonso, a Portuguese vendor who has operated in the area for 21 years. Despite routine patrols, local merchants often witnessed illegal activities, forcing a law enforcement operation to address the issues.

During the operation, 1535 individuals were identified, including shopkeepers and shoppers, and no one was allowed to leave without proper identification. The police deployed sniffer dogs to search for narcotics but reported no findings. ASAE seized counterfeit goods, including handbags, watches, and clothing, valued at nearly €6,000. Two establishments were closed for violations, and four administrative offenses were documented for issues such as the absence of complaint books and inadequate safety measures. SEF detained five individuals for being in the country illegally, while the Tax Inspection issued four infractions for diverse irregularities.

Although the operation disrupted business activities, with shopkeepers and visitors stranded during the inspections, law enforcement described the operation as a success. PSP spokesperson Sub-commissioner Carla Duarte confirmed the peaceful conduct of the operation.

=== July 17, 2023 ===
On July 17, 2023, the Polícia Judiciária's Counterterrorism Unit carried out an operation targeting illegal immigration. The action included 20 search warrants executed across houses and hostels in Martim Moniz. Simultaneously, coordinated arrests were made in Vila Franca de Xira and the South Bank of the Tagus, leading to six detentions.

=== November 19, 2024 ===
On November 8, 2024, the government launched the “Portugal Sempre Seguro” campaign, which spanned six weeks. On November 19, 2024, a police operation in Martim Moniz detained two individuals. The PSP described this as a “special operation for criminal prevention”.

=== December 19, 2024 ===
On December 19, 2024, the PSP carried out a special operation in Martim Moniz focused on criminal prevention. The operation currently has led to the detention of two individuals.

== Bibliography ==
- Torres, Diogo (December 21, 2024). "Operações no Martim Moniz repetem-se todos os anos para combater problemas com décadas: eis as mais mediáticas". SIC Notícias. Diogo Torres.
- Soares, Marisa (December 11, 2010). "Polícia deteve cinco pessoas e identificou 1535 numa rusga ao Martim Moniz". Publico. Marisa Soares.
- Notícias, TVI (December 11, 2010). "Mega-rusga no Martim Moniz: cerca de mil identificados e três detidos". TVI Notícias.
- Portugal, Agência Notícias (December 10, 2010). "Operação policial no Martim Moniz". RTP Notícias. Agência de Notícias de Portugal.
- Ramos, A. M. (December 24, 2024). "Operação no Martim Moniz: IGAI abre processo administrativo relativo ao comportamento da PSP". SIC Notícias. Amélia Moura Ramos.
- Alves, Adriana (December 22, 2024). "Do combate ao tráfico de droga ao comércio e imigração ilegal. Operações policiais no Martim Moniz repetem-se há anos". Observador. Adriana Alves.
- RTP, Antena 1 (December 24, 2024). "Rusga no Martim Moniz. Aguiar-Branco iliba Governo de qualquer responsabilidade". RTP.
