= Operation in Martim Moniz (2024) =

Police operation carried out in Martim Moniz, Lisbon, Portugal

- Part of Police operations in Martim Moniz
- Operation name: Operation in Martim Moniz (2024)
- Part of: Police operations in Martim Moniz
- Type: Police operation
- Scope: Local

Roster
- Planned by: Polícia de Segurança Pública (PSP)
- Initiated by: Polícia de Segurança Pública (PSP)
- Executed by: Polícia de Segurança Pública (PSP)
- Countries participating: Portugal
- No. of countries participating: 1

Mission
- Target: Criminal activities in Martim Moniz
- Objective: Combat drug trafficking, illegal trade, and illegal immigration
- Method: Street searches, public interventions

Timeline
- Date begin: December 19, 2024
- Duration: Ongoing
- Date executed: December 19, 2024

Results
- Suspects: Dozens
- Arrests: 2
- Miscellaneous results: Administrative investigation opened by IGAI

Operation Martim Moniz (2024) is an ongoing police operation carried out on December 19, 2024, in Martim Moniz, Lisbon, Portugal, with the objective to combat drug trafficking, illegal trade, and illegal immigration.

== Background ==
Prior to the operation on December 19, the Polícia de Segurança Pública (PSP) has conducted several operations in the area to combat drug trafficking, illegal trade, and illegal immigration. The current operation is part of ongoing efforts to improve safety and security in the area.

== Operation ==
The operation began on December 19, 2024, and was led by the PSP. Officers conducted street searches and public interventions, focusing on individuals suspected of involvement in illegal activities. The operation resulted in many suspects being cornered and the detention of two Portuguese citizens. Despite the PSP’s claims that all actions were conducted lawfully, the operation is attracting criticism for alleged racial profiling and excessive measures.
