= Polícia Civil (Portugal) =

Police organisation in Portugal

Civil Police
- Polícia Civil

Agency overview
- Formed: 1867
- Dissolved: 1935
- Type: Police
- Jurisdiction: Portugal
- Headquarters: Lisbon
- Parent agency: Ministry of the Kingdom (1867-1910); Ministry of the Interior (1910 - 1935)

The Polícia Civil, or Civil Police, was the general police organisation of Portugal from its inception in 1867 until its progressive dispersion in several autonomous police organisations during the first half of the 20th century. In 1910, following the implementation of the republic, it was redesignated the "Civic Police".

The Civil Police (and its successor Civic Police) was responsible for public safety, criminal investigation, border enforcement, administrative police, and security information collection.

Until 1918, the Civic Police was organised as district bodies, independent of each other, each subordinated to the respective district's civil governor. From 1918, it became a unified national body subordinated to a central body, designated the "General Directorate of Public Security".

The current Polícia de Segurança Pública and Polícia Judiciária have direct origins in the Polícia Civil. The current Serviço de Estrangeiros e Fronteiras, Serviço de Informações de Segurança, and Autoridade de Segurança Alimentar e Económica all also have origins in the Polícia Civil.
