= Foreigners and Borders Service =

Foreigners and Borders Service Serviço de Estrangeiros e Fronteiras
- Logo of SEF
- Abbreviation: SEF

Agency overview
- Formed: 1974
- Preceding agency: Direcção-Geral de Segurança
- Dissolved: October 2023
- Superseding agency: National Unit for Foreigners and Borders

Jurisdictional structure
- National agency: Portugal
- Operations jurisdiction: Portugal
- Primary governing body: Government of Portugal
- Secondary governing body: Ministry of Internal Administration
- General nature: Civilian police
- Specialist jurisdiction: Immigration

Operational structure
- Headquarters: Lisbon
- Agency executive: Manuel Jarmela Palos, National Director

Website
- www.sef.pt

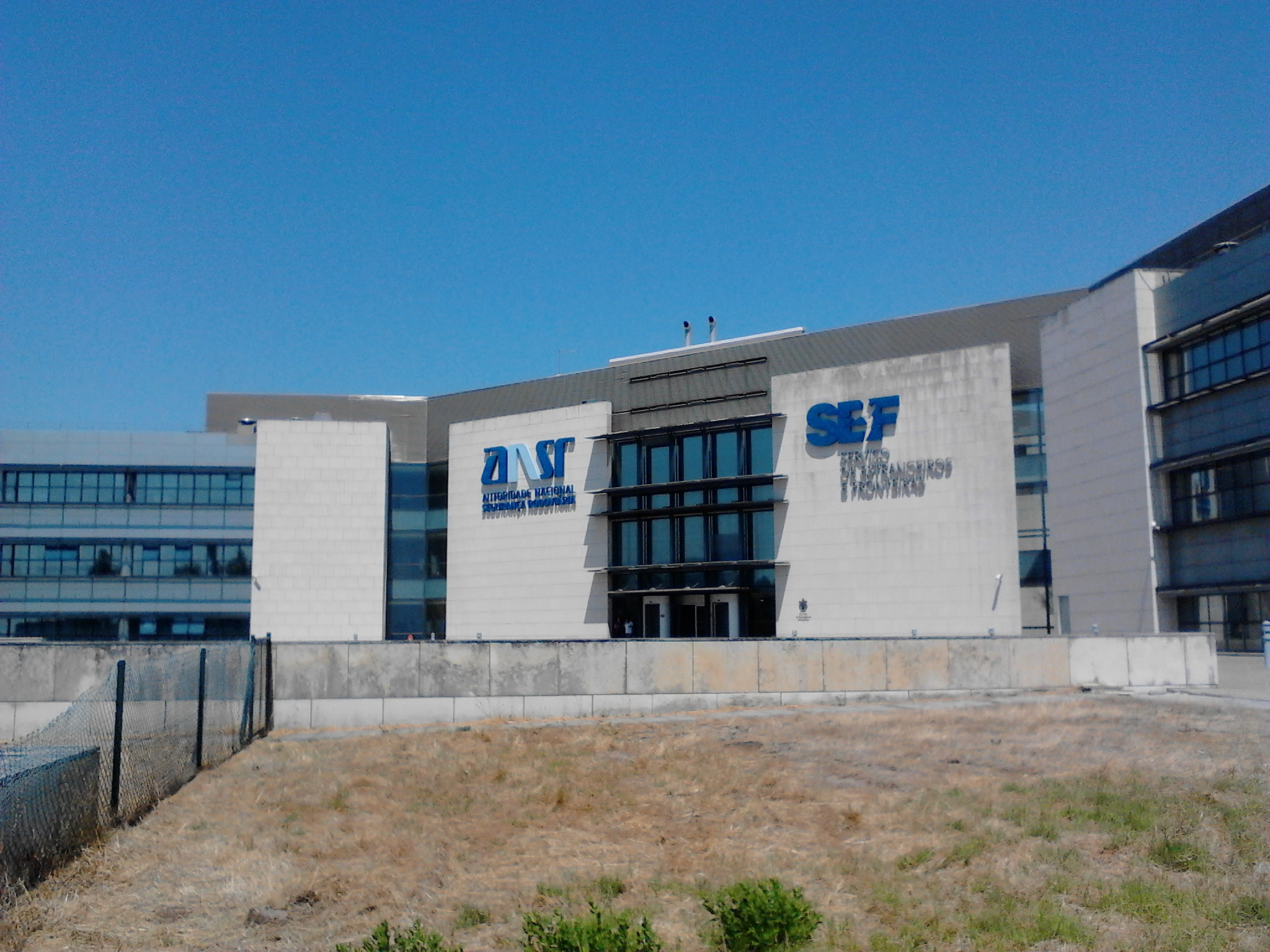
Building of Autoridade Nacional Segurança Rodoviária and Serviço Estrangeiros e Fronteiras

The Foreigners and Borders Service - SEF (Portuguese: Serviço de Estrangeiros e Fronteiras) was the police service integrated into the Ministry of Internal Affairs, whose mission was to enforce immigration and asylum in Portugal, in accordance with the provisions of constitutional, legal and governmental guidelines.

Among other duties, the SEF was the agency responsible for border control and the issuing of residence permits to foreign nationals legally residing in Portugal.

This police force was dissolved in October 2023, splitting its duties between the National Unit for Foreigners and Borders subordinated to the PSP (the Portuguese national civilian police force), the National Republican Guard (the country's Gendarmerie force), the Institute of Registries and Notary and the Agency for Integration, Migration and Asylum

== Organization ==
Headquartered in Lisbon, the SEF was headed by a director general, including central and decentralized services.

- Central services:
  - Administrative Council;
  - Offices: Asylum and Refugees, Documentation, Communication and Public Relations, Juridical and International Relations and Cooperation;
  - Central Directorates: Border, Management and Administration, Immigration, Control and Documentary, Information Technology and Research, Research and Information Analysis;
  - Autonomous departments: Nationality, Operations and Planning and Training.
- Decentralized services:
  - Regional Directorates: Lisbon and Tagus Valley, Alentejo, North, Algarve, Beira, Madeira and Azores;
  - Delegations, border posts and mixed posts, depending on the regional directorates. The mixed posts, located on the Portuguese-Spanish border, are joint units garrisoned by police officers from Portugal and Spain.

== History ==
By decree of King Carlos I on August 29, 1893, the Civil Police of Lisbon (Corpo de Polícia Civil de Lisboa) were divided into three sections, one of which was the Administrative Inspection Police, which, among other duties, was responsible for the monitoring of foreigners with Portugal.

In 1918, the Emigration Police (Polícia de Emigração) were created through Decree-Law No. 4166 of April 27. The Emigration Police were responsible for the control of the land borders and were a division that worked directly under the General Directorate of Public Safety.

In 1928, the Portuguese International Police (Polícia Internacional Portuguesa) were created with the responsibility of monitoring the land borders and foreigners who resided in Portugal. The International Police operated under the Information Police (Polícia de Informações), a body with responsibility for national security, until it was disbanded in 1931.

In 1930 the International Police were moved from the command of the Information Police to the command of the Criminal Investigation Police (Polícia de Investigação Criminal) as its International Section. Through Decree No. 20 125 of July 28, 1931, the Portuguese International Police returned to the Ministry of the Interior, remaining under direct control of the Ministry.

In 1932, the Political and Social Surveillance Section (Secção de Vigilância Política e Social) of the Portuguese International Police was created, responsible for preventing and combating crimes of a political and social nature. Through Decree No. 22 151 of January 23, 1933, the Political and Social Surveillance Section was transformed into the Political and Social Defense Police (Polícia de Defesa Política e Social), becoming independent of the International Police.

By Decree-Law No. 22 992 of August 29, 1933, the Portuguese International Police and the Political and Social Defense Police were once again merged into a single body that became the State Surveillance and Defense Police (Polícia de Vigilância e Defesa do Estado) (PVDE). The PVDE included an International Section which was responsible for verifying the entry, stay and exit of foreigners from the National Territory, their detention if they were deemed undesirable, fighting against espionage, and collaboration with the police of other countries.

In 1945, through Decree-Law No. 35 046 of October 22, the PVDE was transformed into the International and State Defense Police (Polícia Internacional e de Defesa do Estado) (PIDE). PIDE was entrusted with administrative functions and functions to prevent and combat crime. As part of its administrative functions, PIDE was responsible for immigration and passport services, land border, sea and air border services and for foreigners' stay and stay service in Portugal. As part of its functions to prevent and combat crime, it was incumbent upon PIDE to prepare preparatory documents for crimes related to the illegal entry and stay of foreigners in Portugal, border protection against criminal activities crimes of illegal emigration, and crimes against the internal and external security of the State.

PIDE was disbanded in 1969, by Decree-Law no. 49 401 of November 24, and the General Directorate for Security (Direcção-Geral de Segurança) (DGS) was created in its place. The DGS included the Directorate of Foreigners and Border Services (Direção dos Serviços de Estrangeiros e Fronteiras), the basis of the current service which was created in 1974.

In 2023, Portugal's government approved the abolition of the SEF with its responsibilities divided between the Institute of Registries and Notary, Agency for Integration, Migration and Asylum and the National Unit for Foreigners and Borders .

== Controversy ==
In 2020, 42-year old Ukrainian Ihor Homeniuk was beaten to death while in the SEF's custody at Lisbon Airport; in 2021, three SEF officers – Duarte Laja, Luís Silva and Bruno Sousa – were found guilty of inflicting serious bodily harm that ultimately led to Homeniuk's death and sentenced to several years in jail.
