= Agency for Integration, Migration and Asylum =

Portuguese public institution

- Agência para a Integração, Migrações e Asilo
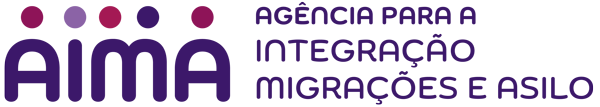

Government agency overview
- Formed: October 29, 2023
- Jurisdiction: Portugal
- Headquarters: Avenida António Augusto de Aguiar, 20, Lisbon; 38.728863211°N 9.1489020412°W
- Parent Government agency: Government of Portugal
- Website: aima.gov.pt

The Agency for Integration, Migration and Asylum (Portuguese: Agência para a Integração, Migrações e Asilo) known in its acronym AIMA is a public institution integrated into the indirect administration of the Government of Portugal, endowed with legal personality, administrative and financial autonomy, and its own assets. On April 6, 2023, the Council of Ministers approved the creation of a new entity that would assume some of the administrative functions of the Foreigners and Borders Service (SEF) and also absorb the functions of the High Commissioner for Migration. On October 29, 2023, with the completion of the SEF's abolition process, AIMA officially began operations. AIMA holds technical and administrative responsibilities in implementing migration policies, such as documentation, database management, relationships and cooperation with other institutions, and external representation, particularly within the Schengen Area and with the European border and asylum agencies.

== History ==
By decree of King Carlos I of August 29, 1893, the Lisbon Civil Police Corps was divided into three sections, one of which was the Administrative Inspection Police, which, among other functions, was responsible for controlling foreigners.

In 1918, the Emigration Police was created by Decree-Law No. 4166 of April 27. The Emigration Police was responsible for controlling land borders and was established as a department that operated under the direct authority of the General Directorate of Public Security, the highest authority of the Civil Police.

In 1928, the Portuguese International Police was created, with the authority to monitor land borders and control foreigners remaining in Portugal. The International Police operated under the Intelligence Police, the agency responsible for state security, which was dissolved in 1931.

The International Police left the Intelligence Police in 1930 and became part of the Criminal Investigation Police, as its International Section. By Decree No. 20,125 of July 28, 1931, the Portuguese International Police returned to the Ministry of the Interior, reporting directly to the minister.

In 1932, the Political and Social Surveillance Section of the Portuguese International Police was created, responsible for preventing and combating crimes of a political and social nature. By Decree No. 22,151 of January 23, 1933, the Political and Social Surveillance Section was transformed into the Political and Social Defense Police, leaving the International Police.

By Decree-Law No. 22,992 of August 29, 1933, the Portuguese International Police and the Political and Social Defense Police were merged into a single body, becoming the State Surveillance and Defense Police (PVDE). The PVDE includes the International Section, which is responsible for verifying the entry, stay, and exit of foreigners from Portuguese territory, their detention—if they are undesirable elements—, combating espionage, and collaborating with the police forces of other countries.

In 1945, by Decree-Law No. 35,046 of October 22, the PVDE was transformed into the International and State Defense Police (PIDE). The PIDE was assigned administrative functions and the functions of preventing and combating crime. As part of its administrative functions, the PIDE was responsible for immigration and passport services, land, sea, and air border crossings, and the passage and residence of foreigners in Portugal. As part of its crime prevention and control functions, the PIDE was responsible for conducting preliminary investigations into criminal cases related to illegal entry and residence in Portugal, violations related to border crossing regulations, illegal immigration and illicit enticement of immigrants, and crimes against the internal and external security of the State.

The PIDE was abolished in 1969 by Decree-Law No. 49,401 of November 24, and the General Directorate of Security (DGS) was created in its place. The DGS included the Directorate of Foreigners and Borders Services within its organization, centralizing responsibility for its responsibilities in the foreigners and borders sector.

On April 25, 1974, the General Directorate of Security was abolished by Decree-Law No. 171/74. The same decree-law assigned the Judicial Police (PIDE) the control of foreigners in Brazil, and the Fiscal Guard the surveillance and enforcement of borders. The assignment of these functions to the Judicial Police and the Fiscal Guard was a temporary and emergency solution following the abolition of the DGS.

Since the Judiciary Police was not specifically designed to perform the function of controlling foreigners, in May 1974, by Decree-Law No. 215/74 of May 22, this function was transferred to the General Command of the Public Security Police Force. The Public Security Police Force General Command also received the responsibilities of issuing passports to foreigners and issuing opinions on applications for visas to enter the country.

To perform these functions, by Decree-Law No. 651/74 of November 22, the Directorate of Foreigners' Services (DSE) was created within the Public Security Police Force General Command.

In 1976, by Decree-Law No. 494-A/76 of June 23, the DSE was restructured, becoming known simply as the "Foreigners Service (SE)," and granted administrative autonomy. It ceased to be dependent on the Public Security Police Force and became directly subordinate to the Minister of Internal Administration.

By Ordinance No. 1045/81 of December 12, the positions of director and deputy director of the SE were equated to director-general and deputy director-general, respectively.

The SE was transformed into the Foreigners and Borders Service (SEF) in 1986, by Decree-Law No. 440/86 of December 31. At that time, the SEF was also assigned border control functions. However, since the SEF did not yet have the resources to ensure this control, the function continued to be provisionally performed by the Fiscal Guard in cooperation with the SEF.

On August 1, 1991, the SEF began operating at all border crossings in the country, replacing the Fiscal Guard.

=== SEF Closure and Creation of AIMA ===
In 2020, the government began studying a model to transform the SEF into a purely administrative entity for granting visas, residence permits, and asylum.

The cadre of inspectors in the various categories, numbering approximately 1,000, will be absorbed by other entities—such as the PSP, GNR, and Judiciary Police—for oversight, prevention, and criminal investigation. For the bureaucratic services of issuing visas and residence permits, currently under the jurisdiction of the SEF, a new agency will be created: the Agency for Integration, Migration, and Asylum, under the jurisdiction of the General Secretariat of Internal Administration.

On July 9, 2021, the Government's proposal defining the transfer of police powers from the Immigration and Borders Service (SEF) to the PSP, GNR, and Judiciary Police, as part of the SEF's restructuring, was approved in Parliament.

On October 20, 2021, the abolition of the SEF and the distribution of its police and administrative powers among the Public Security Police Force, National Republican Guard, Polícia Judiciária, and the Institute of Registries and Notary, as the government intended, were approved in a specialized hearing. The abolition of the Agency for Integration, Migration, and Asylum was also created.

However, at the end of November 2021, a bill authored by the Socialist Party was introduced in the Assembly of the Republic, extending the SEF's abolition period by another six months due to the worsening of the COVID-19 pandemic. This bill was approved by Parliament and signed into law by the President of Portugal, Marcelo Rebelo de Sousa. This leaves the implementation, amendment, or repeal of the previously enacted law in the hands of the next Parliamentary composition and the new government elected after the legislative elections on January 30, 2022. In December 2022, protocols were signed between the police forces to effectively abolish the SEF.

On May 24, 2023, the President Marcelo Rebelo de Sousa promulgated the Government decrees establishing the AIMA and the transition regime for SEF workers to the National Police or IRN (for workers in the administrative career). This decree was published in Diário da República in May 2023.

=== 2026 nationality law reform ===
Under the revision of the Nationality Law promulgated by President António José Seguro in May 2026, the residency period required for naturalisation is counted from the date AIMA issues a residence permit, rather than from the date of application — reversing a 2024 amendment that had been designed to protect applicants from administrative delays. In his promulgation statement, the President stressed the importance of ensuring that statutory naturalisation timelines are not undermined by the slowness of the state, a remark widely understood to refer to AIMA's processing backlog.

== See also ==
- Institute of Registries and Notary
- National Unit for Foreigners and Borders
