= Polícia de Segurança Pública =

National civil police force of Portugal

Public Security Police Polícia de Segurança Pública
- PSP logo

- PSP coat of arms
- Abbreviation: PSP
- Motto: Pela ordem e pela pátria For order and for the fatherland

Agency overview
- Formed: July 2, 1867
- Employees: 21,000

Jurisdictional structure
- National agency (Operations jurisdiction): Portugal
- Operations jurisdiction: Portugal
- Legal jurisdiction: As per operations jurisdiction
- Governing body: Government of Portugal
- General nature: Civilian police

Operational structure
- Headquarters: Lisbon, Portugal
- 38°43′47.7588″N 9°7′52.4172″W
- Elected officer responsible: Margarida Blasco, Minister of Internal Administration
- Agency executive: Superintendent Luís Carrilho, National Director
- Parent agency: Ministry of Home Affairs
- Child agency: National Unit for Foreigners and Borders

Website
- www.psp.pt

The Polícia de Segurança Pública MHTE (PSP; Public Security Police) is the national civil police force of Portugal. Part of the Portuguese security forces, the mission of the PSP is to defend republican democracy, safeguarding internal security and the rights of its citizens. Despite many other functions, the force is generally known for policing urban areas with uniformed police officers, while rural areas are normally policed by National Republican Guard (GNR), the country's national gendarmerie force. PSP is focused in preventive policing, only investigating minor crimes. Investigation of serious crimes falls under the Judicial Police responsibility, which is a separate agency.

Since October 2023, the PSP is now in charge of controlling the Portuguese borders (alongside the GNR), with the dissolution of the Foreigners and Borders Service.

== History ==
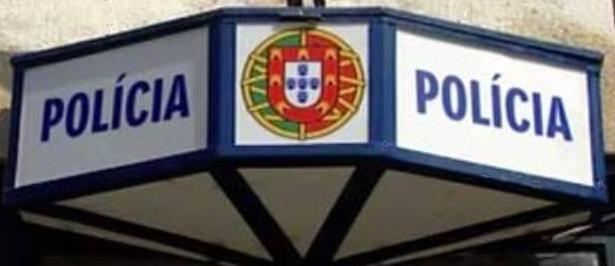
A traditional lantern sign which identifies a PSP station

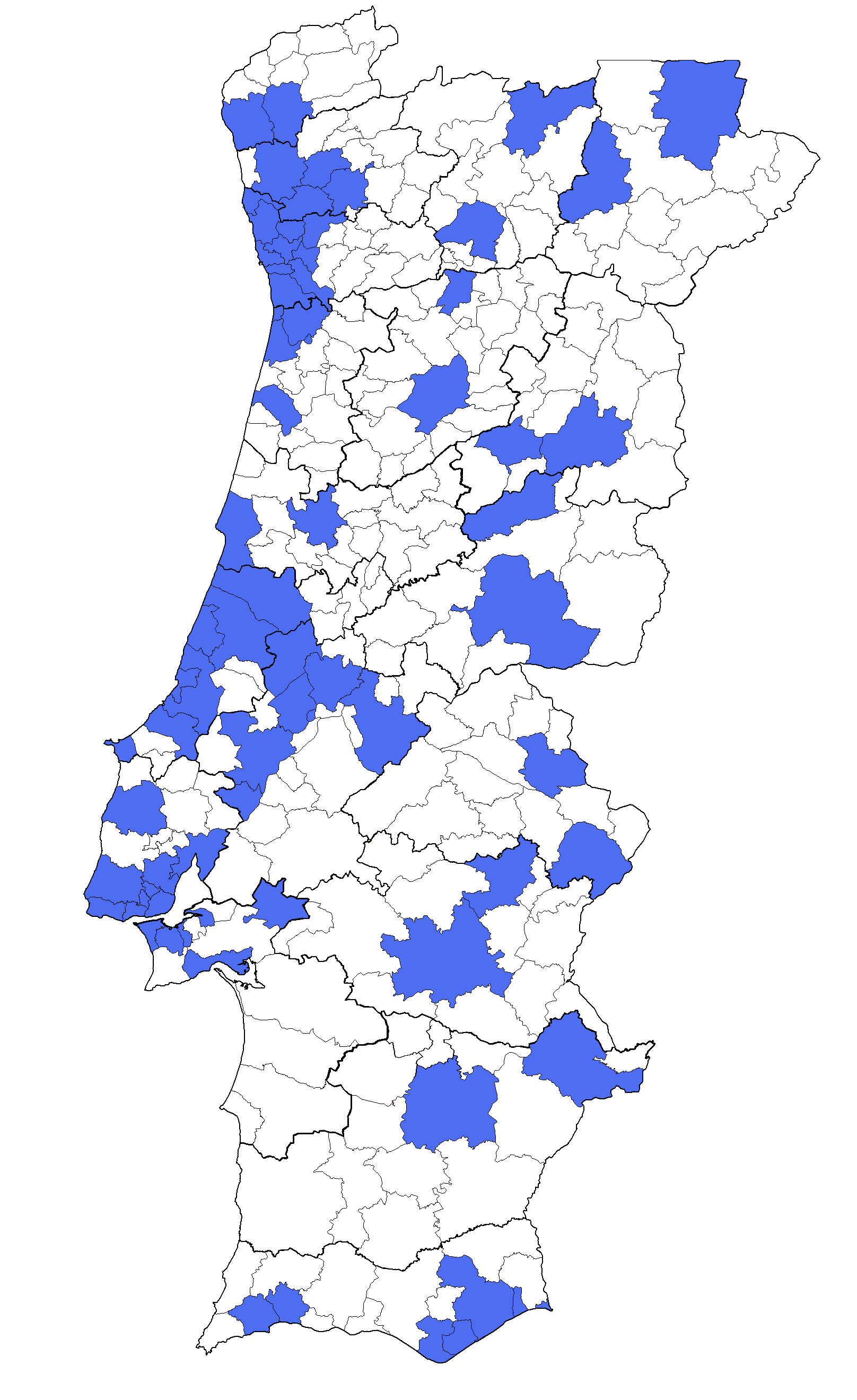
A map of the municipalities policed by the PSP in Mainland Portugal. The Azores and Madeira are entirely policed by PSP, while most of municipalities on the Mainland are patrolled by the GNR.

Like most of Europe, until the Middle Ages the defence of public order was the responsibility of local communities, under the authority of feudal lords and courts.

In Portugal, there are few references to the administration of justice until the second half of the 15th century. With the reign of King Afonso V (under the regency of Infante Pedro) came the first ordinances and penal codes, known as the Ordenações Afonsinas. These ordinances were reissued during the reign of King John I in 1514, after various changes under Manuel I. Some of the early judicial measures came from the early nobles. Afonso Henriques ordered the incarceration of women who lived with elements of the clergy, while in the era of Afonso II, under the influence of Visigothic codes and Roman law resulted in the appearance of the first general laws. Similarly, Afonso III punished anyone who assaulted and robbed the home of another. King Pedro I, the Just, decreed that anyone who falsified coins, gold or silver objects would have their hands and feet amputated.

However, criminals were provided shelters by which to flee justice: the churches, monasteries and "privileged" lands. These privileged lands became areas of thieves and criminals, which resulted in King John extinguishing these areas. This was also something that King Fernando did with bairros, and only churches and convents became sanctuaries.

The first corps of police agents, the Quadrilheiros, was created by Fernando I, on 12 September 1383, consisting of 20 members, who were recruited by force from the strongest physical men, to serve Lisbon. These men were subject to the town council for three years, and required to swear fealty and carry a weapon (a staff), which they would display at their homes, representing a symbol of their authority to arrest and direct criminals to the Corregedores (magistrates). Since these men never received payment for their services, and since these activities were dangerous, most chose to escape the responsibility. For most, these services were intolerable, with little prestige, at various times resulting in bruises and wounds in the execution of their tasks. Owing to this, by 1418, these constables were not required to circle the town. Later, Afonso V provided the Quadrilheiros, on 10 June 1460, with several social and economic privileges. However, these would disappear over time.

Even as Afonso V put into action other laws, regulations, advisories and ordinances, many were ineffective. King Sebastian promulgated laws on 31 January 1559, 17 January 1570, 12 July and 13 August 1571, to reinforce the laws of Fernando I, Edward and Afonso V. To compensate the diminishing benefits of their service, the Quadrilheiros were exempt from paying taxes or military service. Sebastian also ordered that Lisbon be divided into barrios, and that each should be administered by an official of justice, with discretionary powers. On 12 March 1603, King Philip II ordered new regulations for the Quadrilheiros to reinforce their authority. The Lisbon Council, on 30 January 1617, determined that Quadrilheiros should have a label over their doors to identify them, and that the King should confer on them special privileges, such as sitting at the council table. King John IV of Portugal provided a new charter, and a decree on 29 November 1644, forced them (under terrible sanctions) to serve the public, working in the day and evenings. By the first half of the 18th century, little had improved. There continued to be a lack of policing, resulting in leis in 1701, 1702 and 1714. As new circuits were created to blanket the city, many of the criminals were aware that the laws transformed the situation into forgettable enclaves. The Quadrilheiros continued to be a poor class, due to their limitations, resulting in poor public order.

After the 1755 Lisbon earthquake new laws and resolutions were established to maintain public order and reduce anarchy. Sebastião José de Carvalho e Melo, the Marquess of Pombal, found it necessary to create an organism to centralize all laws. By law, on 25 June 1760, he created the Intendência da Polícia da Corte e do Reino (Police Quartermaster of the Court and the Kingdom), and the position of Intendente-Geral da Polícia da Corte e do Reino (Quartermaster-General), with unlimited jurisdiction. The first Quartermaster-General was Inácio Ferreira Souto, at the same time that the term polícia (police) was commonly used, and the Quadrilheiros were relegated to the evenings. However, this foundation did little to resolve criminal issues, and locks on doors, grades on windows and blunderbusses beside the bed continued to be important. The Intendente-Geral was preoccupied with pursuing those who spoke badly of the King, Government or Pombal himself.

Between 1760 and 1780, chaos persisted. By decree, on 18 January 1780, Queen Maria I of Portugal named the old Criminal Judge for the Bairro do Castelo de S. Jorge, Diogo Inácio de Pina Manique, Intendente-Geral. Instructed in laws at the University of Coimbra, he became a powerful chief: he began by expunging the police services of criminal elements, and took advantage of all laws to arrest all criminals or suspects in the Alfama, Mouraria, Bairro Alto and Madragoa, reorganizing the services and bringing a level of respectability to the department.

Around the same time, the Guarda Real de Polícia (Police Royal Guard) was founded on 25 December 1801, a militarized cavalry corps. While correctional "houses" were established, the Polícia Sanitária (Sanitary Police) was established to curb prostitution. The Casa Pia de Lisboa was founded to collect abandoned children. As the Police Royal Guard was overwhelmed with customs supervision, the Guarda das Barreiras was created, later to be replaced by the Guarda das Alfândegas (Customs Guard). In 1808 the General Loison, at the behest of the Quartermaster-General of the Royal Guard Police, established a Polícia Secreta (Secret Police). In 1823, the Liberal government established the Guarda Nacional (National Guard) and on 23 June 1824, a new secret police was reestablished, the Polícia Preventiva (Preventative Police force). On 21 August 1826 the Guarda Real de Polícia was discontinued.

On 8 November 1833, the position of Intendente-Geral was discontinued with José António Maria de Sousa e Azevedo. All the services of the police, from this period, were transferred to the prefects (later civil governors), of which the Prefect of the Province of Estremadura, Bento Pereira do Carmo, stands out. The police prerogatives of this position remained temporary and territorial, influenced by prefects, general administrators and later civil governors. On 18 April 1835, the kingdom was divided into 17 administrative districts, with a civil governor for each district, and divided into municipalities, civil parishes and ecclesiastical parishes. The civil governors were responsible for public security.

During a period of political confusion caused by the Liberal Wars, the Guarda Real de Polícia was substituted by the Guarda Municipal (Municipal Guard), currently represented by the GNR, then created by Pereira do Carmo. In this entanglement of police institutions, many times contradictory, the Guarda Nacional was dissolved in 1846. Yet, the inconsistency of public security resulted in the 22 February 1838 law, that created a corps to maintain public security in each of the administrative districts of the country. Until this period, the laws, decrees and dispatches that were published provided better results in thefts and murders. The guards and judges, however, felt they were betrayed by threats and reprisals, which resulted in a demoralization of the profession. To remedy this situation, King Luis ordered the publication of a law that founded a corps of civil police (2 July 1867). With the formation of the Corpo de Polícia Civil, the foundations were laid for creating the Public Security Police.

In July 2024, the PSP assisted French law enforcement by sending officers to Paris to protect the city for the Olympics with National Republican Guard troops.

In June 2025, a member of the PSP, an officer from the Lisbon Municipal Police, was arrested alongside other members of the Neo-Nazi Lusitanian Armillary Movement on charges of plotting the kidnapping and assassination of prominent political figures such as Portuguese Prime Minister Luís Montenegro, Carlos Moedas, Mayor of Lisbon, and former presidents Aníbal Cavaco Silva and Marcelo Rebelo de Sousa.

== Roles and responsibilities ==
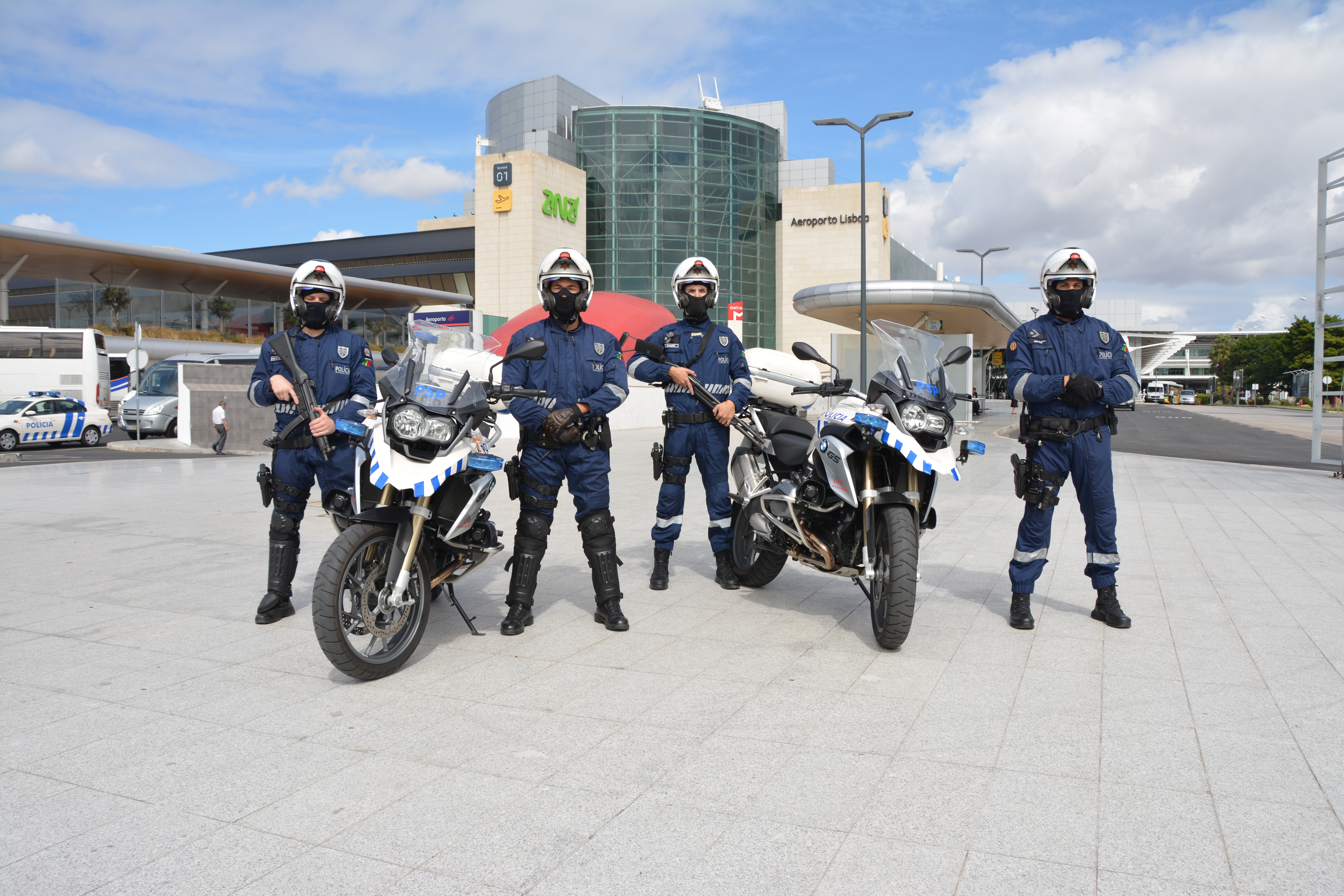
PSP Prevention and Immediate Reaction Team at Lisbon Airport.

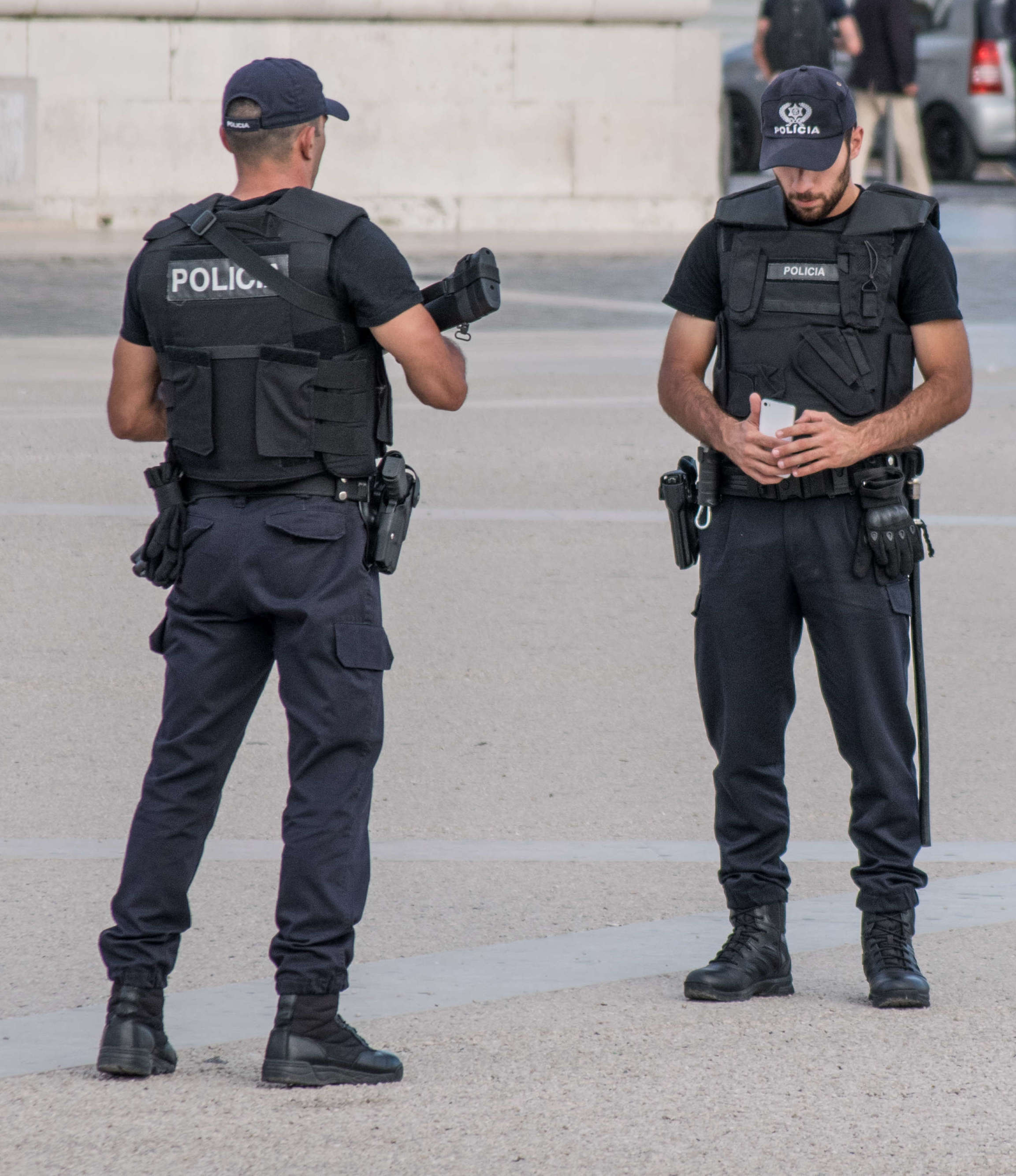
Two PSP officers on patrol at Praça do Comércio in Lisbon.

The PSP has the following police roles and responsibilities:

- Preventive Police: includes the prevention of general or organised crime and protection from terrorism guaranteeing the security of people and goods (to the level of petty crime), in areas that are not specifically reserved for the Polícia Judiciária (PJ)
- Public Order: this includes the responsibility for intervention and special operations
- Administrative Police: this is the administrative arm of the security forces, including the responsibility for acts emanating from the competent authority and some matters of licensing
- Immigration law, refuge and asylum, extradition and expulsion, as well as border control: since October 2023.
- Exclusive powers: responsible for weapons control, ammunition and explosives, outside the authority of the armed and security forces, as well as guaranteeing the security for personnel of domestic and foreign entities, and other citizens subject to threat of person
- Special powers: responsible for airport security and the protection of diplomatic missions both locally and internationally
- Special Programs: responsible for educational programs, such as the Safe School, security of the elderly, trade insurance, spring insurance, domestic violence and the Integrated Policing of Proximity Program (PIPP)

== Organisation ==
The Public Security Police is headed by a National Director, who is under the dependency of the Minister of Internal Administration. Its internal organization includes the following components:

- National Directorate, including:
1. National Director
2. Inspector General
3. Deputy National Director for operations and security
4. Deputy National Director for human resources
5. Deputy National Director for logistics and finance
- Educational police establishments, including:
1. Higher Institute of Police Science and Internal Security (ISCPSI, Instituto Superior de Ciências Policiais e Segurança Interna) – university level police officer academy
2. Practical School of Police (EPP, Escola Prática de Polícia) – constable training school
- Special Police Unit, which includes as its sub-units:
1. Intervention Corps (CI, Corpo de Intervenção) – riot sub-unit
2. Personal Security Corps (CSP, Corpo de Segurança Pessoal) – bodyguard sub-unit
3. Special Operations Group (GOE, Grupo de Operações Especiais) – special operations and anti-terrorist sub-unit
4. Centre for Inactivation of Explosives and Underground Security (CIEXSS, Centro de Inativação de Explosivos e Segurança em Subsolo) – bomb disposal and underground security sub-unit
5. Canine Technical Operational Group (GOC, Grupo Operacional Cinotécnico) – police dog sub-unit
- Police territorial commands, including
1. Metropolitan commands (CoMet, comandos metropolitanos): Lisbon and Porto
2. Regional commands (CR, comandos regionais): Azores and Madeira
3. District commands (CD, comandos distritais): Faro, Beja, Évora, Portalegre, Setúbal, Santarém, Leiria, Castelo Branco, Coimbra, Aveiro, Viseu, Guarda, Braga, Viana do Castelo, Vila Real and Bragança.

The regional and district commands have territorial jurisdiction over, respectively, the corresponding autonomous regions and districts. Despite their designations, the territorial jurisdictions of the metropolitan commands are not the metropolitan areas of Lisbon and Porto but are instead the districts of Lisbon and Porto.

The squad (esquadra in Portuguese) is the traditional basic police sub-unit of the PSP, each being usually headed by a Sub-Commissioner. Most of the squads are responsible for the generic territorial preventive policing of a given area of responsibility, which can be a neighbourhood of a large city or an entire small city. Each of these squads occupies a police station and because of that, by metonymy, the police stations are usually referred to as esquadras in Portugal. Besides the previous, there are also specialized squads (transit, criminal investigation, intervention, airport security, tourism support, etc.).

The minor territorial commands (district commands of Beja, Bragança, Castelo Branco, Évora, Guarda, Portalegre and Viana do Castelo) are directly sub-divided in squads. They usually include two or more territorial generic squads, a transit squad, a criminal investigation squad and an intervention and inspection squad.

In the major territorial commands (metropolitan commands, regional commands and district commands of Aveiro, Braga Coimbra, Faro, Leiria, Santarém, Setúbal, Vila Real and Viseu) there is, however, an intermediate level of sub-unit between them and the squad, this being the division. These commands are thus organized in two or more divisions, each including several squads. The divisions can be generic (named "police divisions" and being responsible for a given area of responsibility) or specialized (transit, criminal investigation, airport security, installations security or public transportation security).

The municipal police of Lisbon and Porto are also composed of PSP members, who retain all their police powers. However, they are not under the operational command of the PSP, but are instead under the direct control of the municipal governments of Lisbon and Porto. These two police forces are thus different from the rest of the municipal police forces of the country, which are made of municipal employees with very limited police powers.

== Personnel ==
As of 2019, the entry level salary for a police officer in the PSP is 789 euros a month.

PSP police personnel is divided into three categories: officers, chiefs and agents. The access to the agent category requires the conclusion of a technical course in the Practical School of Police (EPP) at Torres Novas. The access to the category of chief is made through the promotion from the category of agent, after the conclusion of a specific course also at the EPP. The access to the officer category requires a previous graduation from the Higher Institute of Police Sciences and Internal Security (ISCPSI), a university-level police academy.

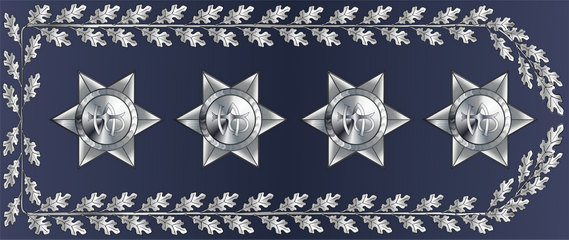
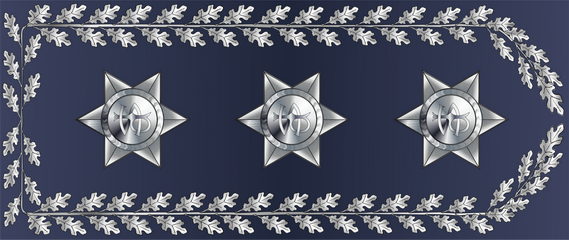
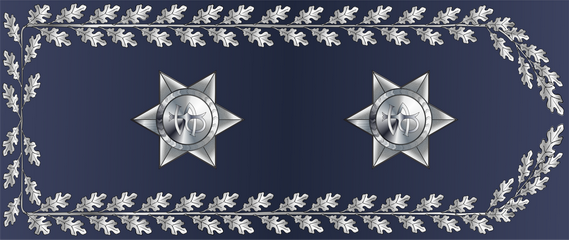
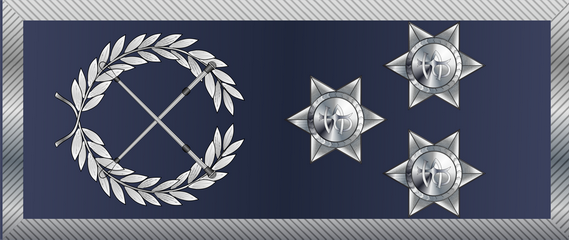
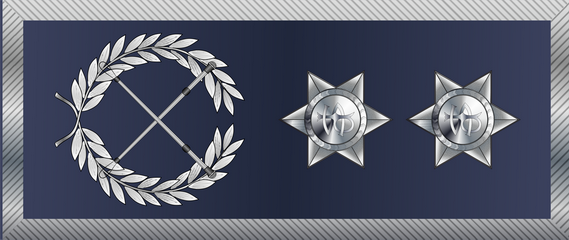
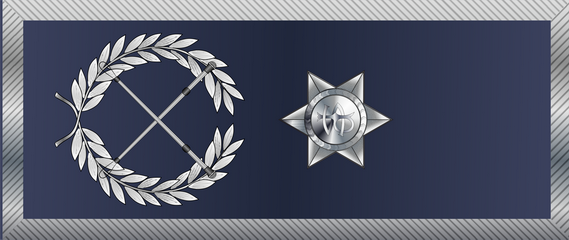
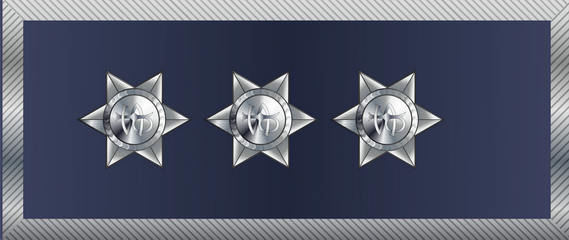
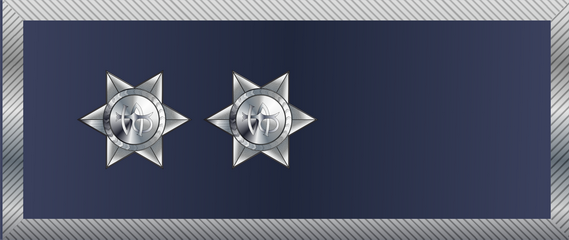
Rank group	Officers Oficiais de Polícia
Portuguese Polícia de Segurança Pública
Portuguese Polícia de Segurança Pública	Superintendente-chefe			Superintendente	Intendente	Subintendente	Comissário	Subcomissário
Portuguese Polícia de Segurança Pública	National Director of the PSP	Deputy National Director or Inspector General of the PSP	commanding officer of a metropolitan / regional command	commanding officer of a district command or second-in-command of a metropolitan / regional command	division commander in a metropolitan / regional command or second-in-command of a district command	division commander in a district command or second-in-command of a division commanded by an intendent	second-in-command of a division commanded by a sub-intendent	commanding officer of a police squad (police station)

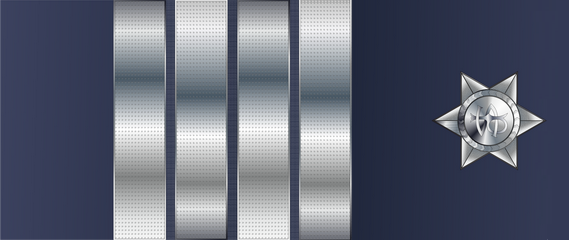
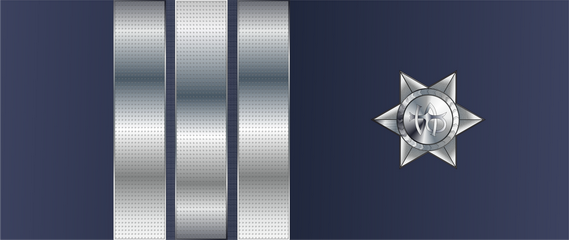
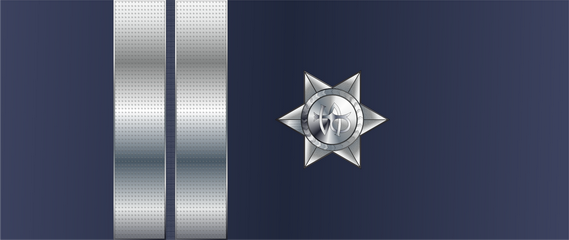
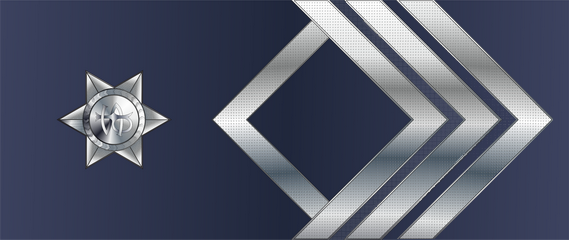
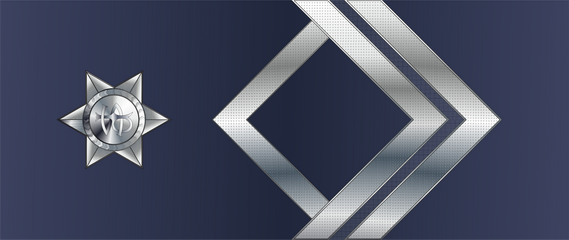
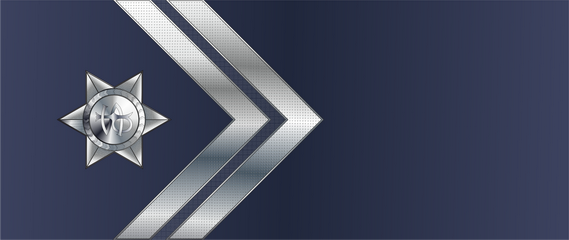
Rank group	Chiefs Chefes de Polícia			Agents Agentes de Polícia
Portuguese Polícia de Segurança Pública
Portuguese Polícia de Segurança Pública	Chefe coordenador	Chefe principal	Chefe	Agente coordenador	Agente principal	Agente
Portuguese Polícia de Segurança Pública	assists officers in command of subunits	auxiliary of a unit commanding officer	supervisor of staff and leader of police teams	coordinating agents assigned to their sector of activity	a senior principal agent may perform the same functions as a chief, others perform the same functions as an agent	functions of police constable

- ISCPSI Students:

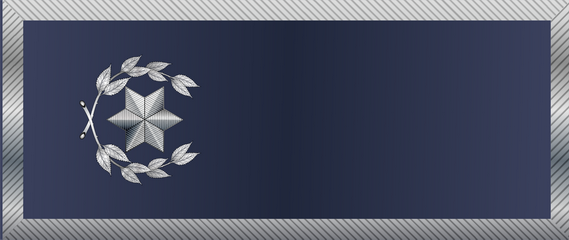
- Officer Candidate: student of the 5th year of the Training Course for Police Officers (CFOP)
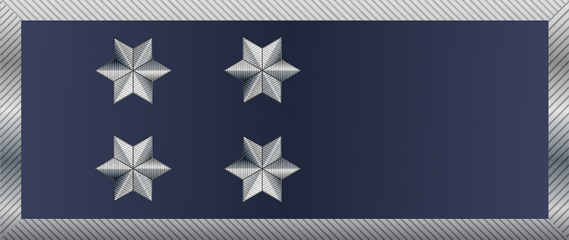
- Cadet: student of the 4th year of the CFOP
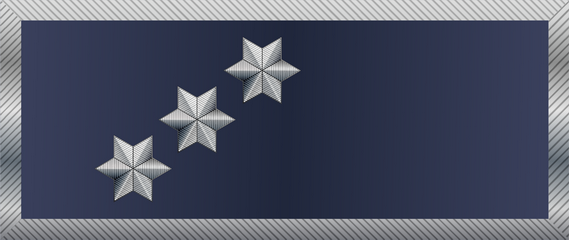
- Cadet: student of the 3rd year of the CFOP
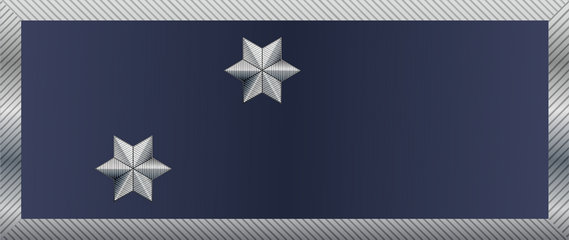
- Cadet: student of the 2nd year of the CFOP
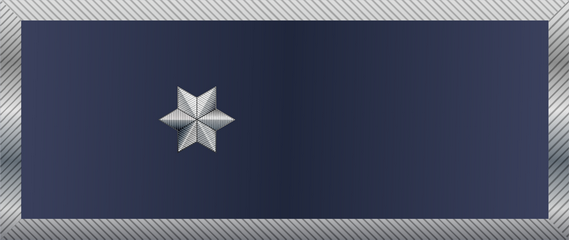
- Cadet: student of the 1st year of the CFOP

== Vehicles ==
=== Models ===
Since 2004, the Skoda Octavia has been the principal model of patrol car used by the Public Security Police. Since 2018 PSP is receiving hundreds of Renault Captur patrol vehicles, many equipped with Federal Signal push bumpers, to replace older patrol cars. However, a number of other models are also in service, including Nissan Leaf, Renault Zoe, Fiat Tipo, Toyota Avensis and Toyota RAV4 jeeps. Single apprehended Audi R8, BMW i8, Porsche 996 Turbo and Subaru Impreza Prodrive are used as special pursuit cars. Ground speed radar equipped Toyota Avensis and Volkswagen Sharan minivans are used for traffic enforcement, such as some Audi A4 3.0 TDI and Bmw 335i unmarked patrol cars, while some Toyota Hilux pickup trucks and Land Rover Defender jeeps are used for patrolling non urban and mountainous areas.

A huge number vans are also in service, including newer Mercedes-Benz Metris and Sprinter (with flip down wire shield across the windscreen) and Citroën Berlingo to prisoners transport.

The Special Police Unit uses several special vehicles, including MAN tow trucks, Iveco water cannons and armored vehicles, such as two Ford Streit and some Volkswagen Sharan (with flip down wire shield across the windscreen and Federal Signal front push bumper).

=== Vehicle appearance ===
PSP vehicles have some lack of uniform appearance due to the successive introduction of new liveries which however are usually only applied to new vehicles, with the existing ones keeping the original old ones.

The most recent livery for the PSP vehicles was introduced in 2014. The basic version of this livery consists in a white body with diagonal blue stripes, the wording "POLÍCIA" (police) in blue sans-serif lettering in the sides, rear and bonnet and a logo with the national colors on the front side panels. For the traffic patrol vehicles there is a variant, which intermediates red stripes with the blue ones and has the wording "TRÂNSITO" (transit) on the rear side panels. Another variant of the livery is its negative version (blue, with the stripes and wording in white) to be applied in vans and special vehicles. The three variants have been applied to most of the vehicles acquired after 2014. However, other vehicles carry older or not standard liveries, namely the 2004 livery (similar to the 2014 livery, but with the wording "POLICIA" in serif letters—which are inclined in the sides—and the PSP coat of arms instead of the national colors logo), the 1991 livery (blue body with doors, trunk and bonnet in white and crossed by red stripes), the 1979 livery (blue body with white front doors), the all blue body (used by most of the vans and special vehicles) and several special police programs (Safe School, Tourism support, etc.) liveries.

A restored Volkswagen Beetle historical patrol car, kept for use in ceremonies and exhibitions, is anachronistically painted with the 1979–1991 livery, instead of the original livery used by the PSP in the 1960s and 1970s, which consisted in a blue body and grey mudguards, with the word "POLÍCIA" on the doors.

=== Vehicles photos ===
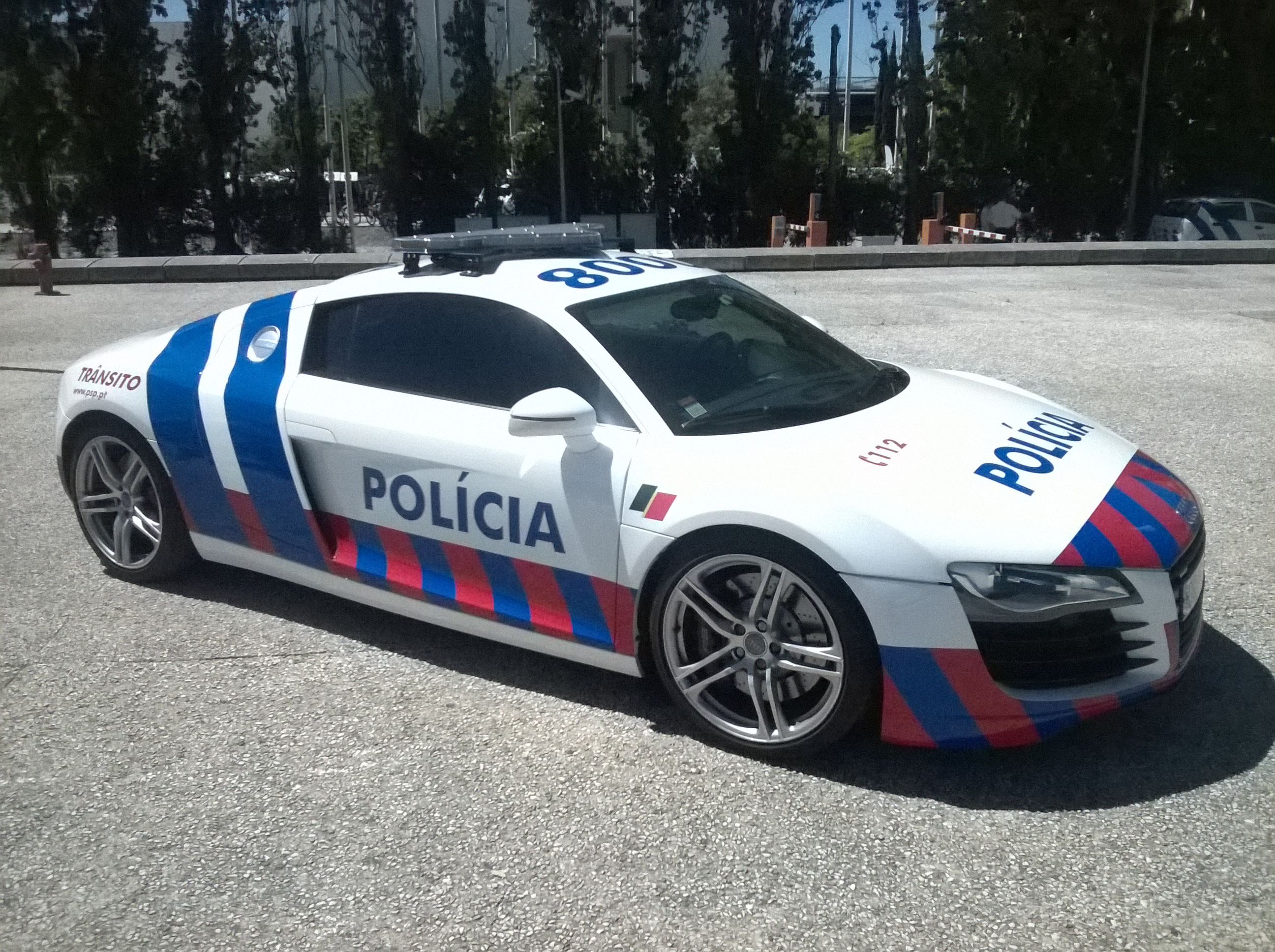
PSP's Audi R8 is one of its special vehicles.

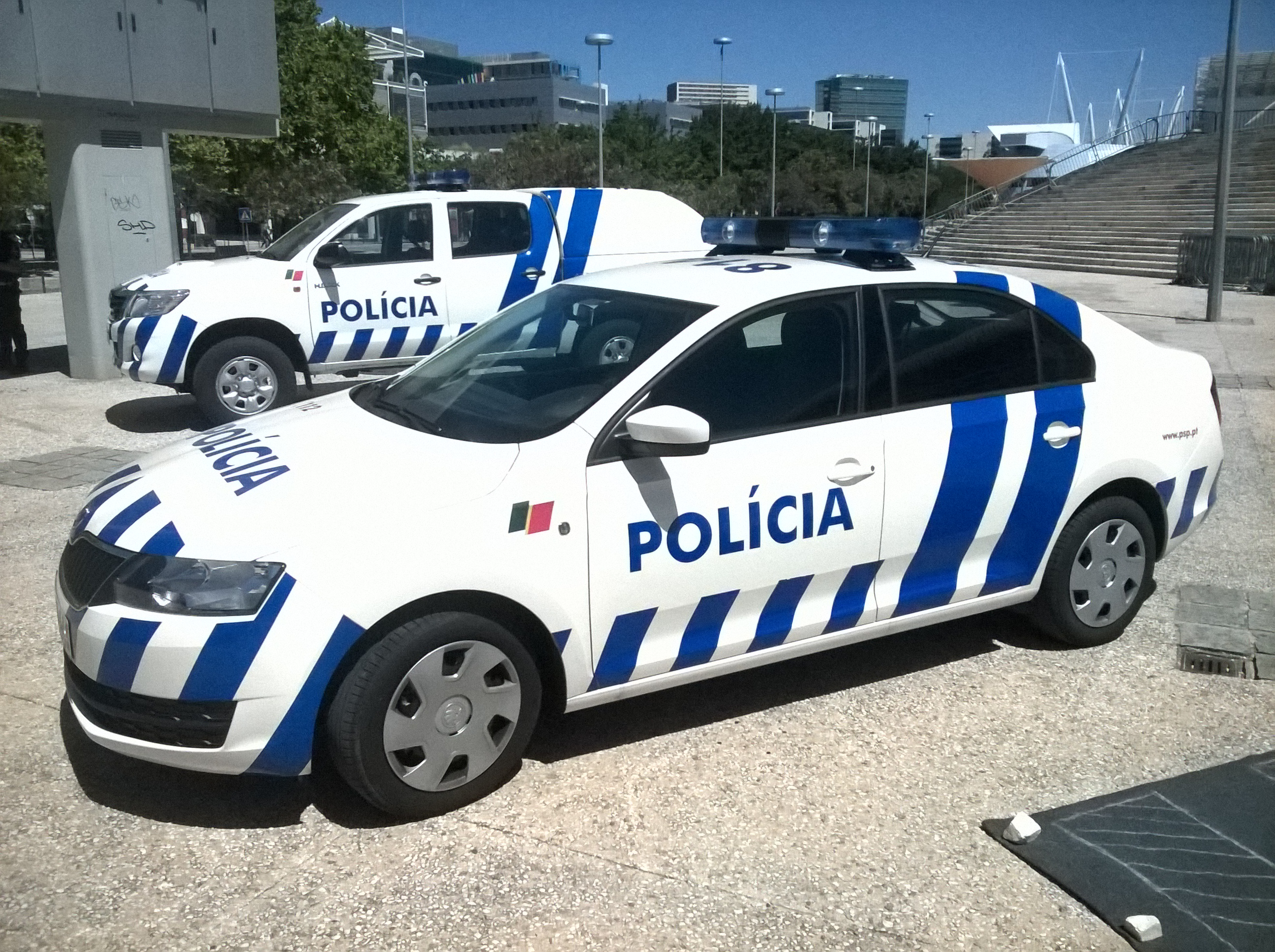
Skoda Octavia III patrol car and Toyota Hilux pickup truck.

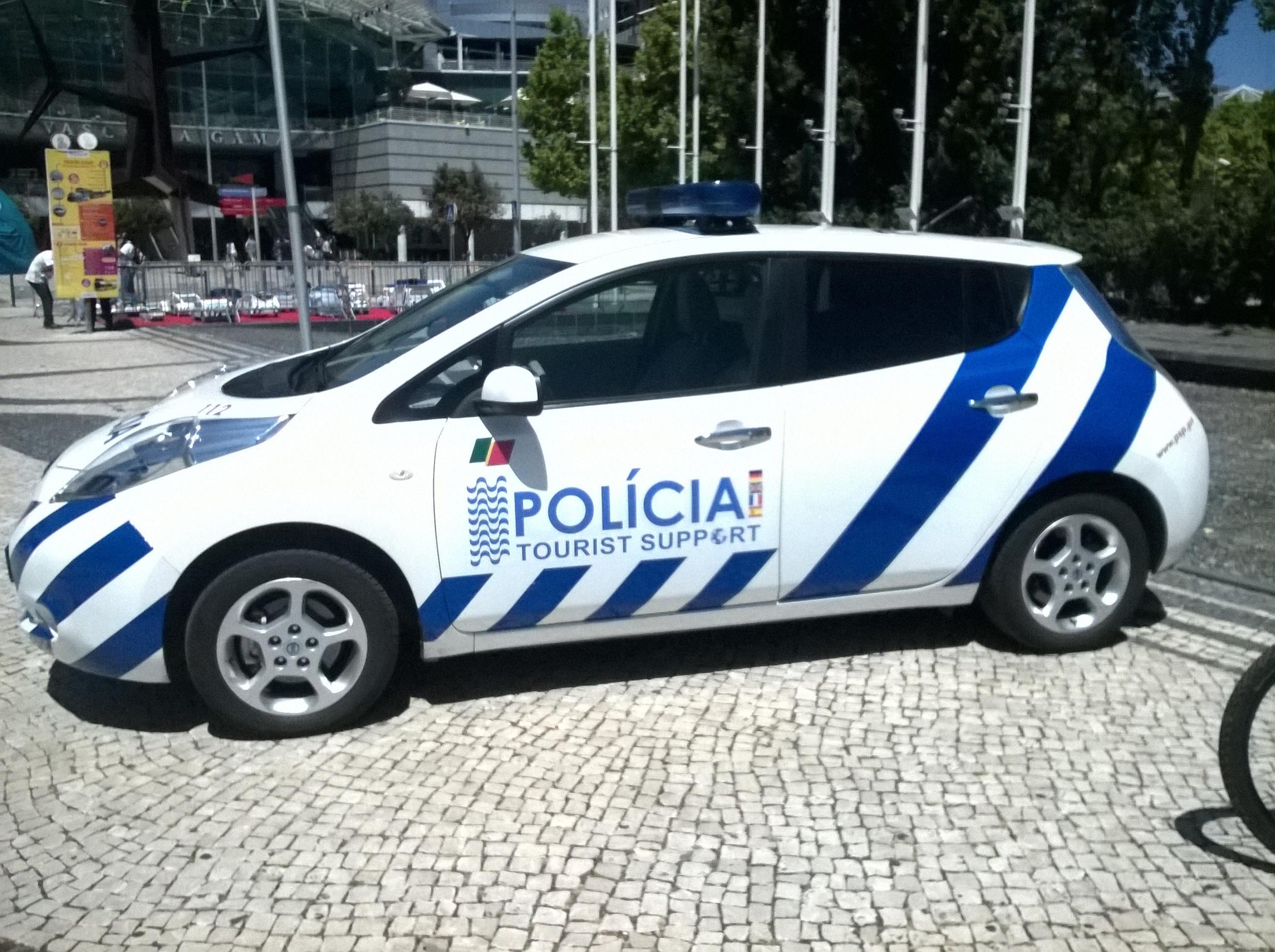
Nissan Leaf electrical vehicle, for tourism support.

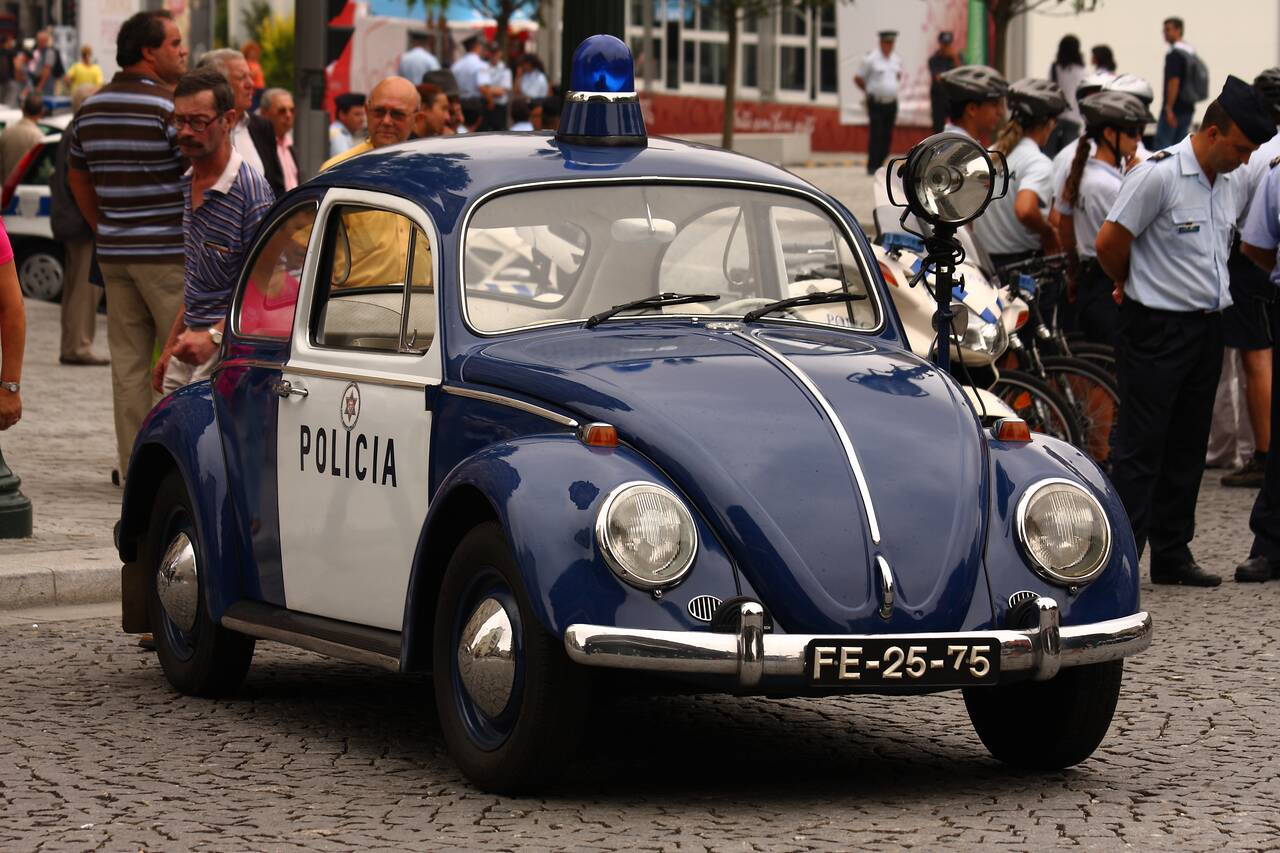
Historical 1960s Volkswagen Beetle patrol car, with 1979 livery.

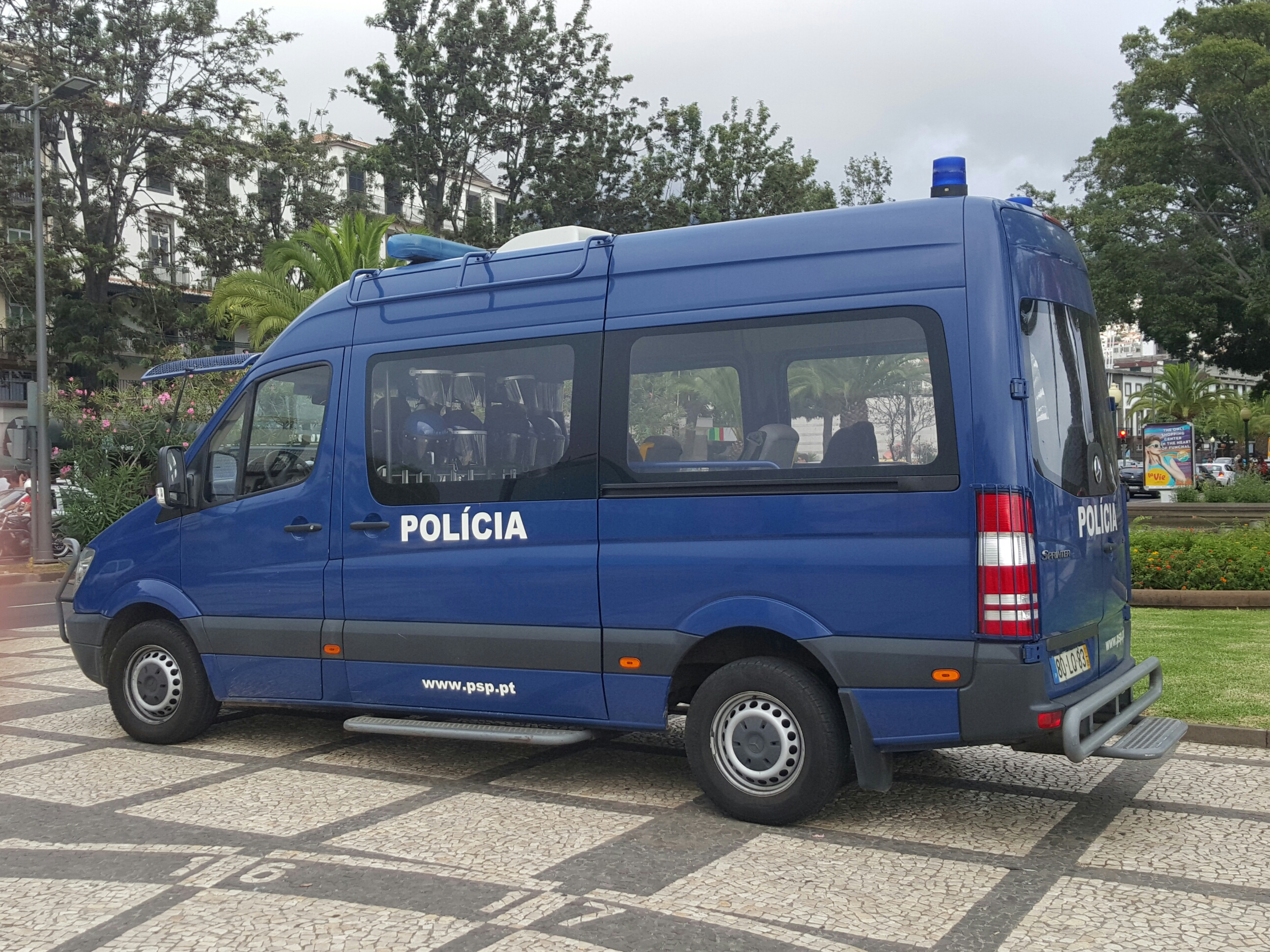
Mercedes-Benz Sprinter van is normally used to transport Rapid Intervention Teams (EIR).

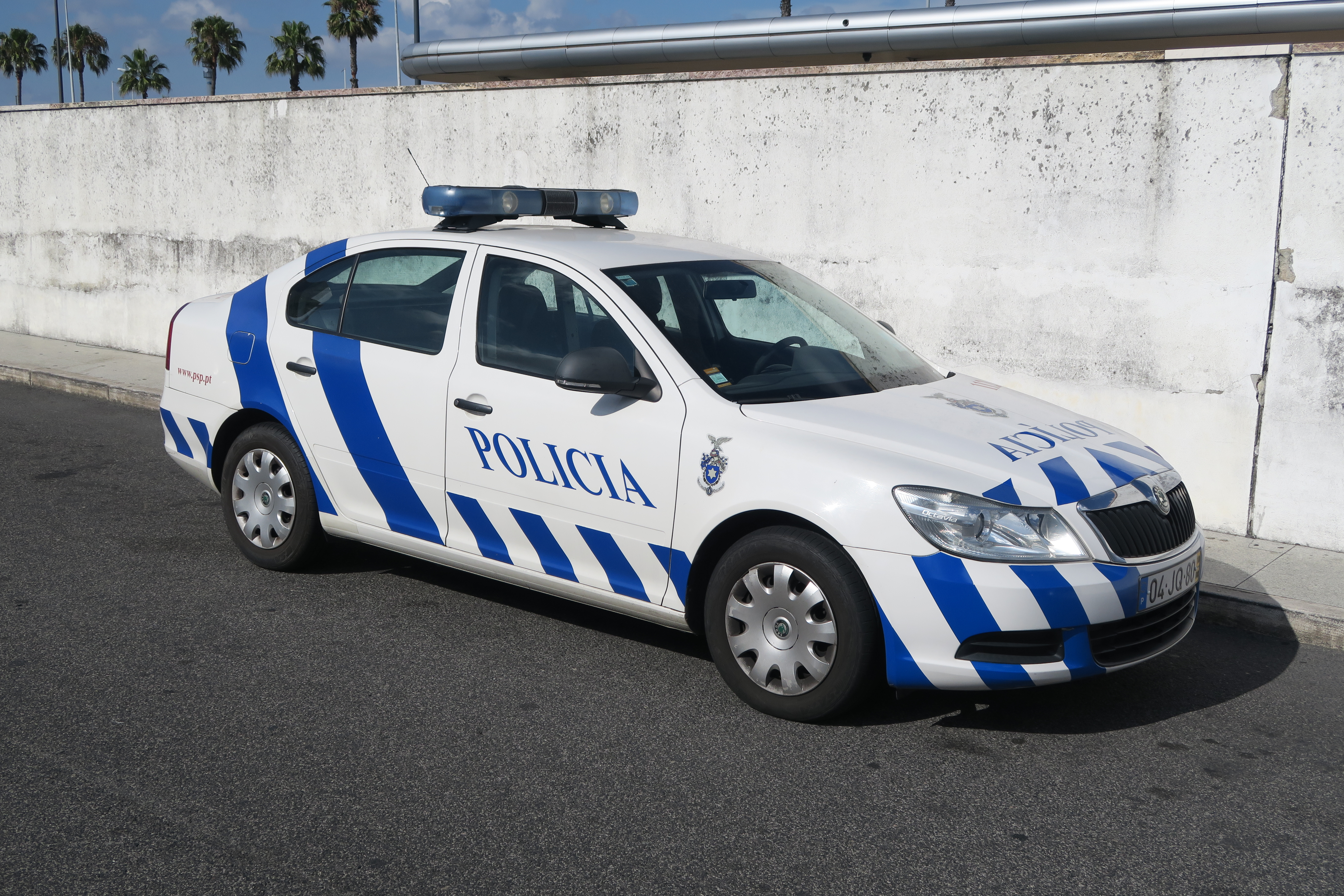
The PSP has received hundreds of Škoda Octavias in various versions since the beginning of the 21st century.

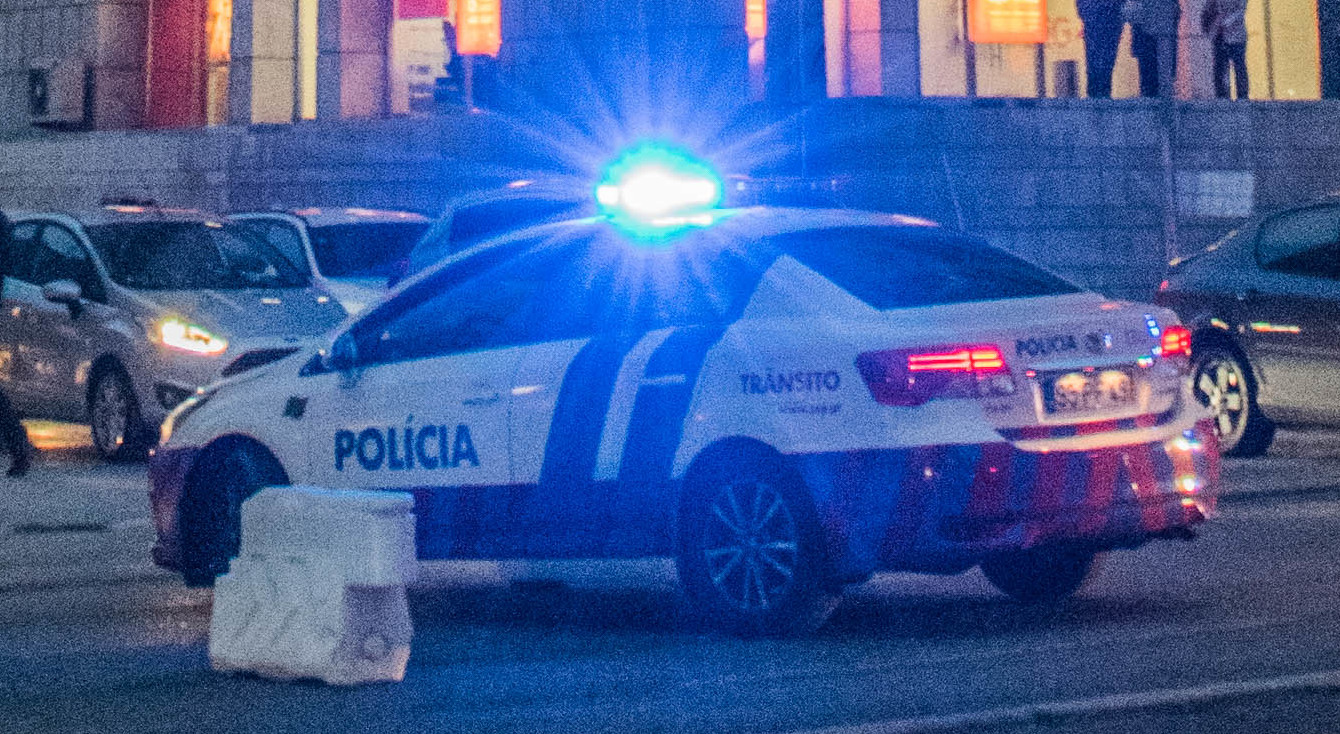
Toyota Avensis from the PSP traffic police department.

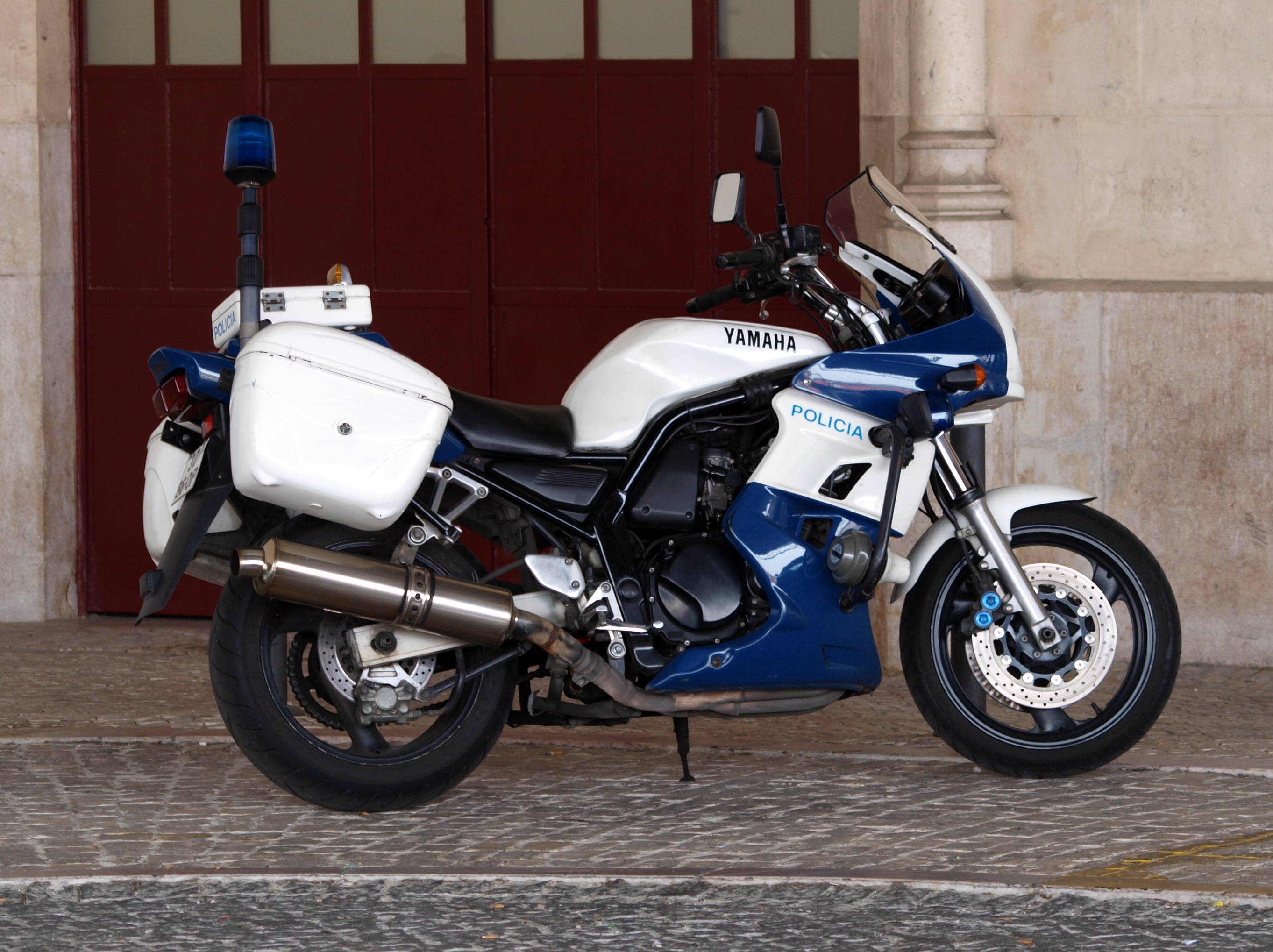
The PSP uses a wide range of motorcycles, here a Yamaha.

== Equipment ==
Weapon	Origin	Type
Glock 19	Austria	Standard issue sidearm
Glock 17	Austria	Sidearm for special operations
Heckler & Koch USP Compact	Germany	Sidearm for special operations
SIG Sauer SP 2022	Germany	Sidearm for special operations
Walther P99	Germany	Sidearm for special operations
Desert Eagle	Israel	Sidearm for special operations, chambered in .357 Magnum
Heckler & Koch MP5	Germany	Submachine gun
Beretta M12	Italy	Submachine gun
FN P90	Belgium	Submachine gun
HK UMP45	Germany	Submachine gun
Fabarm SDASS Tactical	Italy	Shotgun
Benelli M3	Italy	Shotgun
Benelli M4	Italy	Shotgun
H&K 416A5	Germany	Assault rifle
H&K G36	Germany	Assault rifle
SIG Sauer MCX	USA	Assault rifle
Accuracy International Arctic Warfare	UK	Sniper rifle
FN 303	Belgium	Less lethal launcher

== See also ==
- Polícia Judiciária – Portuguese criminal investigation police
- Guarda Nacional Republicana (GNR) – Portuguese gendarmerie force
- Foreigners and Borders Service – Portuguese border and immigration police
- Serviço de Informações de Segurança – Portuguese internal security intelligence agency
- Autoridade de Segurança Alimentar e Económica – Portuguese food and economical police
- Guarda Fiscal – former Portuguese customs guard
- Polícia Internacional e de Defesa do Estado (PIDE) – former Portuguese border, migration, political and state security police
