= Carrilho =

Carrilho is a surname. Notable people with the surname include:

- Altamiro Carrilho (1924–2012), Brazilian musician and composer
- António José Cavaco Carrilho (born 1942), Portuguese Roman Catholic bishop
- Júlio Eduardo Zamith Carrilho (1946–2021), Mozambican politician
- Luís Carrilho, Portuguese United Nations official
- Manuel Maria Carrilho (born 1951), Portuguese academic and politician
- Mirano Carrilho (born 1975), Dutch football player
