= Agostinho Lourenço =

Portuguese secret police official

- Born: September 5, 1886; Portugal
- Died: August 2, 1964 (aged 77) Portugal
- Allegiance: Portugal
- Branch: Portuguese Army
- Commands: PVDE (founder and director), Interpol (President, 1956–1961)
- Known for: Founding PVDE, presidency of Interpol
- Conflicts: World War I
- Awards: Commander of the Royal Victorian Order

Agostinho Lourenço da Conceição Pereira (5 September 1886 – 2 August 1964) was a Portuguese soldier, best known for founding and running the Portuguese political police under the Estado Novo.

Lourenço fought in World War I for the British. After the war, he acted briefly as governor of Leiria. He was made Commander of the Royal Victorian Order for services to the future Edward VIII, then Prince of Wales, who was visiting Lisbon in 1931.

In 1933, in the early days of the Salazar regime, Lourenço founded the PVDE, Portugal's security and immigration police. According to Professor Douglas Wheeler, "an analysis of Lourenco's career suggests strongly that British Intelligence Services' influence had an impact on the structure and activity of PVDE". Lourenço had earned a reputation with British observers, recorded in a confidential print generated at the British embassy, which suggested a "pro-British" bias on his part.

He always kept a good relationship with the MI6, which allowed him in 1956 to become the president of Interpol, which he remained for five years.
