= National Unit for Foreigners and Borders =

National Unit for Foreigners and Borders Unidade Nacional de Estrangeiros e Fronteiras

Agency overview
- Formed: July 2025
- Preceding agency: Foreigners and Borders Service

Jurisdictional structure
- National agency: Portugal
- Operations jurisdiction: Portugal
- Primary governing body: Government of Portugal
- Secondary governing body: Polícia de Segurança Pública
- General nature: Civilian police
- Specialist jurisdiction: Immigration

Operational structure
- Headquarters: Avenida Defensores de Chaves 6, Lisbon

Website
- www.gov.pt/entidades/unidade-de-coordenacao-de-fronteiras-e-estrangeiros

National Unit for Foreigners and Borders (Portuguese: Unidade Nacional de Estrangeiros e Fronteiras) is a specialized police unit of the Public Security Police (PSP) of Portugal, responsible for matters relating to foreign nationals, airport border control, immigration enforcement, deportations and airport security.

== History ==
The National Unit for Foreigners and Borders was established through Law No. 55-C/2025, of 22 July 2025, adopted by the Portuguese Assembly of the Republic following the abolishment of Foreigners and Borders Service (SEF) in October 2023 as part of a major restructuring of Portugal's immigration administration and the subsequent redistribution of immigration-related responsibilities among several Portuguese public authorities. Its organizational framework was subsequently supplemented by Administrative Regulation No. 304/2025/1, of 9 September 2025. By August 2026, a year following its inception it processed almost 20 million individuals at its air border checkpoints with 428 arrests made, mostly for document fraud and international arrest warrants. In September 2026 report it received positive assessment while criticism surfaced regarding the lack of resources for internal oversight, and accusations that there is an excessive focus on the policing aspects of immigration.

== Powers and duties ==
The UNEF possesses a broad range of statutory responsibilities. These extend beyond conventional border-policing activities and include immigration enforcement, airport policing, administrative procedures and international cooperation. One of its central responsibilities is the surveillance, inspection and control of Portugal's airport borders (Control of land border is done by the National Republican Guard).

Its prerogatives include the following:

- Monitoring the movement of passengers entering and leaving Portugal
- Inspecting travel documents
- Conducting border checks in accordance with applicable Portuguese and European legislation.
- Identifying persons who may be inadmissible under immigration rules
- Applying relevant procedures at designated airport border checkpoints
- Issuing visas at airport borders where legally authorized
- Removal, readmission and deportation of irregular migrants
- Monitoring the stay of foreign citizens on national territory, within the PSP's area of jurisdiction
- Administration of the temporary holding centres at the Porto CIT (Santo António) and equivalent facilities at the Lisbon, Porto and Faro airports

== Structure ==
The UNEF forms part of the PSP, Portugal's national civilian police force, and is incorporated into its organizational structure under the directorate responsible for foreigners, borders and airport security.

Under Article 4 of Law No. 55-C/2025, the unit is directed by the deputy national director responsible for the relevant organizational division. The director is assisted by a deputy director.

Local operational subunits perform frontline functions, including airport border operations, aviation security and immigration inspections.

The legislation distinguishes between airport-border operational units, which fall directly under the UNEF, and territorial immigration-inspection units, which operate under regional command structures.

== See also ==
- Institute of Registries and Notary
- Agency for Integration, Migration and Asylum
