= General Directorate of Security (Portugal) =

Portuguese criminal police body, 1969 and 1974

- Direção-Geral de Segurança
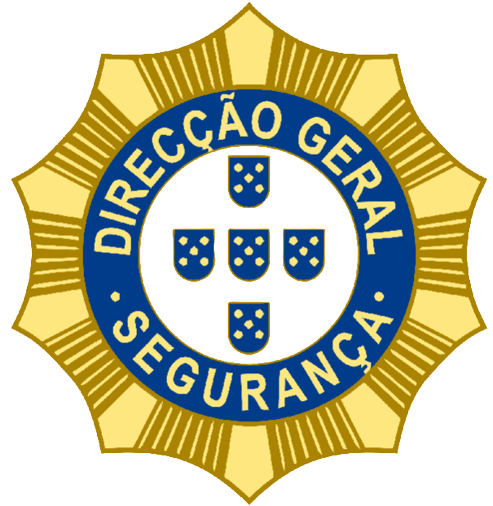
- Badge of the DGS

Agency overview
- Formed: 1969
- Preceding agency: PIDE
- Dissolved: 1974
- Superseding agency: Military Intelligence Police Foreigners and Borders Service
- Type: Police
- Jurisdiction: Portugal
- Headquarters: Rua António Maria Cardoso 22, Lisbon, Portugal; 38°42′30.6936″N 9°8′33.0576″W
- Parent agency: Ministry of the Interior

The General Directorate of Security (Portuguese: Direção-Geral de Segurança; DGS) was a Portuguese criminal police body active between 1969 and 1974, during the last years of the Estado Novo dictatorship.

Although their duties included, in addition to state security, the supervision of foreigners, border control, and the fight against illegal trafficking of migrants, historically the DGS was essentially a secret police responsible for repression, without judicial control, of all forms of political opposition to the Estado Novo.

The DGS was created in 1969 to succeed to the International and State Defense Police (PIDE), by Decree-Law no. 49 401, of November 24, 1969, of the government of Marcello Caetano. It was disbanded in the continent and islands in 1974, following the Revolution of April 25 that ended the Estado Novo, by Decree-Law no. 171/74 of April 25. In overseas territories it continued to exist until 1975, under the designation of "Military Intelligence Police".

== Organisation ==
In 1974, the General Directorate of Security was organized as follows:

- Directorate
  - Director-General
  - Subdirector-General
  - Inspector-Supervisors
- Superior Technical Council
- Board of the Director-General
- Board of Administrators
- 1st Directorate (Directorate of Information Services)
  - Information and Counter-Information Division
  - Telecommunications Division
  - File Section
- 2nd Directorate (Directorate for Investigation and Litigation Services)
  - Division of Investigation
  - Technical Divisions (identification services)
  - Prison Section
  - Litigation (including Legal Consultancy)
  - National Office of Interpol
- 3rd Directorate (Directorate of Foreigners and Borders Services)
  - Division of Foreigners
  - Border Division
- 4th Directorate (Directorate of Administrative Services)
  - Division of Personnel
  - Division of General Services
  - Accounting Section
  - Treasury Section
  - General Archive
  - Secretariat of Defense of War Facilities and Material
- Technical School
- Delegations (Luanda, Lourenço Marques, Coimbra and Porto)
- Subdelegations
- Surveillance Posts
- Border posts
