= PIDE =

1933–1969 Portuguese secret police force

International and State Defense Police
- Polícia Internacional e de Defesa do Estado

Agency overview
- Formed: 22 October 1933
- Preceding agency: Polícia de Vigilância e de Defesa do Estado
- Dissolved: 24 November 1969
- Superseding agency: Direcção-Geral de Segurança
- Type: Secret police
- Jurisdiction: Portugal
- Headquarters: Rua António Maria Cardoso 22, Lisbon, Portugal; 38°42′30.6936″N 9°8′33.0576″W
- Parent agency: Ministry of the Interior

The International and State Defense Police (Portuguese: Polícia Internacional e de Defesa do Estado; PIDE) was a Portuguese security agency that existed during the Estado Novo regime of António de Oliveira Salazar. Formally, the main roles of the PIDE were the border, immigration and emigration control and internal and external state security. Over time, it came to be known for its secret police activities.

The agency that would later become the PIDE was established by the Decree-Law 22992 of August 1933, as the State Surveillance and Defense Police (Polícia de Vigilância e Defesa do Estado) or PVDE. It resulted from the merger of two former agencies, the Portuguese International Police and the Political and Social Defense Police.

PVDE was founded by Captain Agostinho Lourenço, who in 1956 would become the president of Interpol.

The PVDE was transformed into the PIDE in 1945. PIDE was itself transformed into the Directorate-General of Security or DGS in 1968. After the 25 April 1974 Carnation Revolution, DGS was disbanded in Portugal, but continued to exist transitionally in the Portuguese overseas territories as the Military Information Police or PIM, being finally completely disbanded in 1975.

Although the acronym PIDE was only formally used from 1945 to 1969, the set of successive secret polices that existed during the 40 years of the Estado Novo regime are commonly referred to as the PIDE. Historically, this set of police agencies is also often referred as PIDE/DGS, from the acronyms of its two last designations. It is referred to in this last way in article 292 of the Portuguese Constitution, which states its criminalization and judgment of its former officers.

During its existence, the organization was known for its actions during the Spanish Civil War, its role as a political police, its counter-espionage activities during World War II and its counter-insurgency operations in the Portuguese Colonial War.

== History ==
=== Background ===
During the Portuguese First Republic and the following Ditadura Nacional regimes, the police services were reorganized several times, with the remote ancestors of PIDE appearing.

In 1918, the police services were organized as an umbrella organization named Civic Police, which started to include two agencies that were the remote ancestors of the PIDE: the Preventive Police and the Emigration Police. The first agency was a secret police responsible for the State security. The Preventive Police would become the State Security Police in 1919, the Social Defense Police in April 1919, and the Preventive and State Security Police in October 1919. The Emigration Police was an agency responsible for the border and migration control, with a special focus in the fight against illegal emigration.

After the 28 May 1926 coup d'état and the establishment of the military Ditadura Nacional, the Preventive and State Security Police was disbanded. However, soon after, two similar agencies were created, the Lisbon Information Police and the Porto Information Police, respectively under the control of the civil governor of Lisbon and the civil governor of Porto. In 1928, the two agencies were merged into a single Information Police under the direct control of the Minister of the Interior. In the same year, the Portuguese International Police was created as a section of the Information Police, succeeding the former Emigration Police. In 1931, the Information Police was disbanded and the Portuguese International Police became autonomous, under the direct control of the Minister of the Interior. In 1932, the Political and Social Surveillance Section of the Portuguese International Police was created, with the same role of the former Information Police.

With Salazar in office as prime minister, the Political and Social Surveillance Section became autonomous in January 1933, as the Political and Social Surveillance Police. The Portuguese International Police and the Political and Social Surveillance Police would merge in August 1933, as the PVDE.

=== PVDE ===
The origins of PIDE can be traced to 1933, the year of the inauguration of the Estado Novo. Under direct orders from Salazar himself, the Surveillance and State Defence (Polícia de Vigilância e de Defesa do Estado) or PVDE was created, with two main sections:

- Social and Political Defence Section, which was used to prevent and repress crimes of a political and social nature (see: Censorship)
- International Section, which was used to control the entrance of immigrants, to expel undesirable immigrants and to take care of counter-espionage and/or international espionage.

PVDE was founded and led by Captain Agostinho Lourenço. According to Professor Douglas Wheeler "an analysis of Lourenco's career suggest[s] strongly that British Intelligence Services' influence had an impact on the structure and activity of PVDE". Lourenço had earned a reputation with British observers, recorded in a confidential document generated at the British Embassy, which suggested a "pro-British" bias on his part. Lourenço always kept a good relationship with the MI6, which helped him to become the head of the international police organization Interpol in 1956.

In 1936, the prison of Tarrafal was created in the Portuguese colony of Cape Verde. This camp, under the direct control of the PVDE, was the destination for those political prisoners considered dangerous by the regime. Among the first prisoners were the convicted sailors from the 1936 Naval Revolt. The sailors, affiliated with the Communist Party, had attempted to sail two Portuguese Navy ships out of Lisbon to join the Spanish Republican forces fighting in Spain. Throughout the more than 40 years of the Estado Novo, 32 people lost their lives in Tarrafal, which was known for its severe methods of torture.

Also in 1936, with the beginning of the Spanish Civil War and in 1937 with the attempt against Salazar's life by anarchist terrorists, the PVDE started focusing its battle against communism and the underground Portuguese Communist Party. During this pre-World War II period, several Italian and German advisers came to Portugal to help the PVDE adopt a model similar to the Gestapo.

During World War II, the PVDE experienced its most intense period of activity. Neutral Lisbon was the European center of espionage and one of the favourite exile destinations. Writers such as Ian Fleming (the creator of James Bond) were based there, while other prominent people such as the Duke of Windsor and the Spanish Royal Family were exiled in Estoril. German spies attempted to buy information on trans-Atlantic shipping to help their submarines fight the Battle of the Atlantic. The Spaniard Juan Pujol Garcia, better known as Codename Garbo, passed on misinformation to the Germans, hoping it would hasten the end of the Spanish State—he was recruited by Britain as a double agent while in Lisbon. Conversely, William Colepaugh, an American traitor, was recruited as an agent by the Germans while his ship was in port in Lisbon—he was subsequently landed by U-boat, U-1230, in Maine before being captured. In June 1943, a commercial airliner carrying the actor Leslie Howard was shot down over the Bay of Biscay by the Luftwaffe after taking off from Lisbon, possibly because German spies in Lisbon believed that Prime Minister Winston Churchill was on board.

Several American reports called Lisbon "The Capital of Espionage". However, the PVDE always maintained a neutral stance towards foreign espionage activity, as long as no one intervened in Portuguese internal policies.

=== PIDE ===
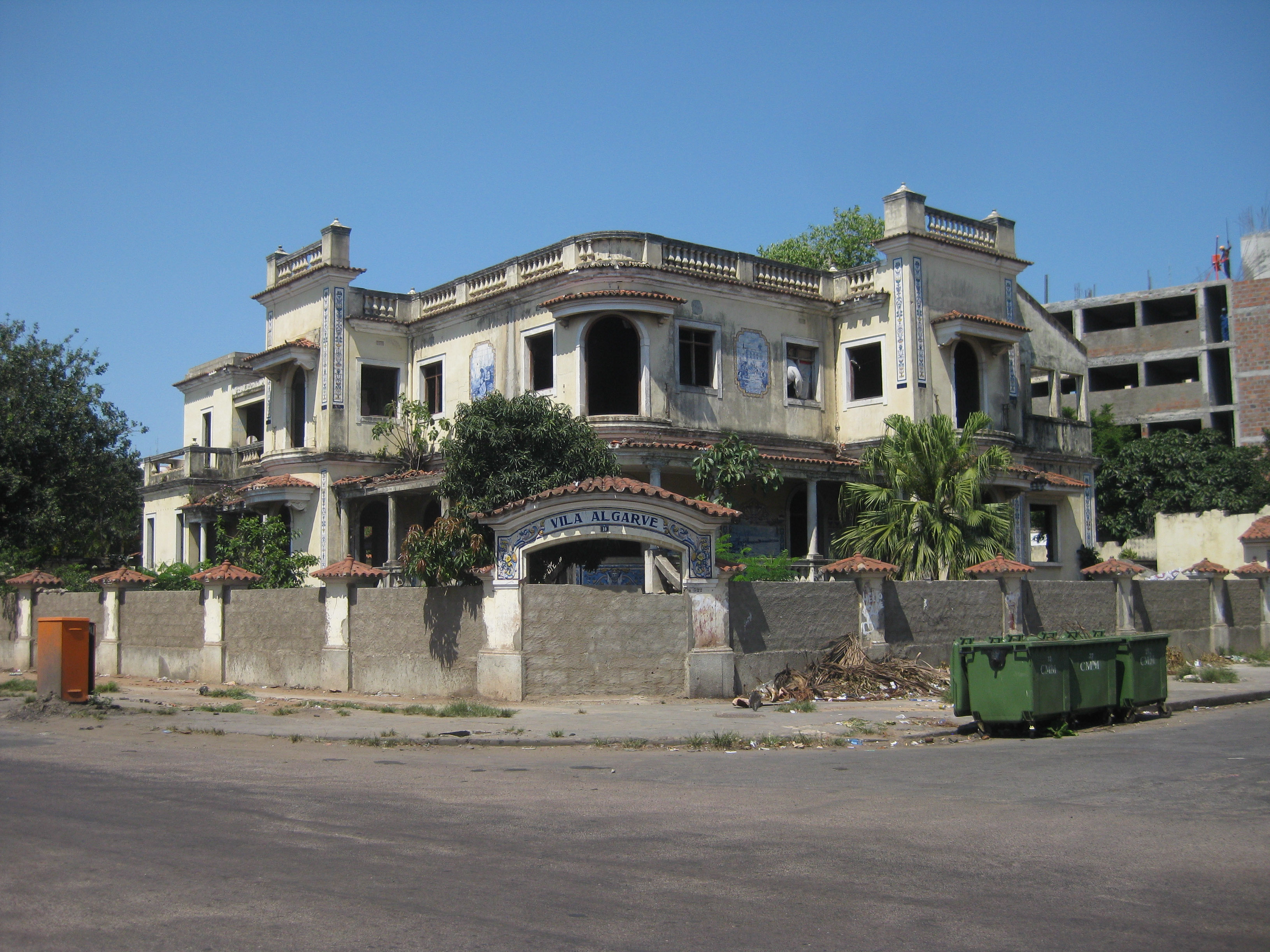
Vila Algarve in November 2011, the former headquarters of PIDE in Mozambique, at Lourenço Marques (presently Maputo).

In 1945, the PVDE was renamed and replaced by the PIDE. Unlike its predecessor, which sought inspiration in the Gestapo, the regime's propaganda alleged PIDE followed the Scotland Yard model. Receiving the same status as the Polícia Judiciária (criminal investigation police), it had full powers to investigate, detain, and arrest anyone who was thought to be plotting against the State. It had two main functions:

- Administrative functions (which included those related to the migration services)
- Criminal prevention and repression functions. As there was already in place one criminal investigation police that dealt with ordinary crime, PIDE focused on political and social issues (political opposition, social unrest, student movements), which the political regime criminalised. At the same time, PIDE was the Portuguese police corresponding with the international Interpol network.

PIDE is considered by many authors as being one of the most functional and effective secret services in history. Using a wide network of covert cells, which were spread throughout Portugal and its overseas territories, PIDE had infiltrated agents into almost every underground movement, including the Portuguese Communist Party as well as the independence movements in Angola and Mozambique. The PIDE encouraged citizens – the so-called bufos (snitches) – to denounce suspicious activities, through the use of monetary and prestige incentives. This resulted in an extremely effective espionage service which was able to fully control almost every aspect of Portuguese daily life.

PIDE was credited with the torture and assassination of many political activists, controlled the political soundness of any candidate to public employment, vetoing anyone who could be suspicious of favouring the opposition and had extrajudicial powers of detention, so it could retain in prison any activist after he or she had served a sentence. These actions extended beyond politicians and significant activists. For example, law student Aurora Rodrigues was arrested for association with the Portuguese Workers' Communist Party and was kept awake for weeks and endured multiple simulated drownings.

The PIDE intensified its actions during the Portuguese Colonial War, creating a successful paramilitary unit called Flechas (Arrows). Yves Guérin-Sérac, a former officer of the French Army and founder of the OAS right-wing terrorist group during the Algerian War of Independence (1954–62), set up "Aginter Press" in Lisbon and participated with the PIDE in covert operations.

=== DGS ===
Directorate-General of Security
- Direcção-Geral de Segurança
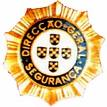

Agency overview
- Formed: 1969
- Preceding agency: Polícia Internacional e de Defesa do Estado
- Dissolved: April 25, 1974
- Jurisdiction: Portugal
- Headquarters: Lisbon
- Minister responsible: (etc.)
- Agency executive: (etc.)
- Parent agency: Ministry of the Interior

In 1969, Marcelo Caetano changed the name PIDE to DGS (Direcção-Geral de Segurança, "General Security Directorate"). The death of Salazar and the subsequent ascension of Caetano brought some attempts at democratization, in order to avoid popular insurgency against censorship, the ongoing colonial war, and the general restriction of civil rights. This resulted in a decrease in the perceived level of violence used by the secret police and a consequent reduction in its effectiveness.

== End of PIDE/DGS ==
The most dramatic moments of the 1974 Carnation Revolution occurred near the DGS headquarters at António Maria Cardoso Street in Lisbon. Unidentified agents - desperate after being surrounded by rebellious troops and a throng of civilians - opened fire from the top of the building, killing four demonstrators. In turn, a DGS agent was also killed by the rebellious troops when trying to escape. These five people were the sole victims of the coup d'état which brought down the dictatorship.

This was the last strategic point to be occupied by the insurgents, thus leading to the escape of many of the agents and the destruction of most of the records. In the days following the revolution, most escaped to Spain or went underground. Many of the agents, including the director-general Silva Pais were, however, captured. Of those agents, 89 would later escape from the Alcoentre penitentiary, in a massive and never well-explained prison break in June 1975.

Some of the PIDE/DGS archives were reportedly handed over by the Portuguese Communist Party to Soviet agents.

After being sanitized, the corporation continued its operations in the Portuguese colonies under the name of the Military Information Police (Polícia de Informação Militar).

A commission was created for the extinction of the secret police. The remainder of the documents since 1990 are in the Torre do Tombo National Archive. They can be accessed, but the names of agents and informers are not disclosed.

The only PIDE agents who faced trial were those responsible for the death of exiled opposition leader Humberto Delgado. They were tried in absentia and the case dragged on for several years. None of them served time in jail.

The brutality of the PIDE/DGS is dramatised in the 2000 film April Captains, about the events of the day of the Carnation Revolution.

Because of the memory of the abuses of the PIDE/DGS in supporting the regime, the establishment of a new civilian intelligence agency was delayed for more than a decade. However, following a terrorist attack on the Embassy of Turkey, the assassination of a Palestine Liberation Organization representative at a Socialist International conference in 1983, and a number of domestic terrorist attacks by isolated far-left and far-right groups, the Portuguese government became convinced of the need for a new intelligence agency. This led to the establishment of the Sistema de Informações da República Portuguesa (SIRP, Intelligence System of the Portuguese Republic) in 1984.

== See also ==
- Sistema de Informações da República Portuguesa
- OPS
- Portuguese Legion (Estado Novo)
- Flechas
- Tarrafal concentration camp - prison camp run by PIDE in Cape Verde
