= State Surveillance and Defense Police =

State Surveillance and Defense Police Polícia de Vigilância e Defesa do Estado
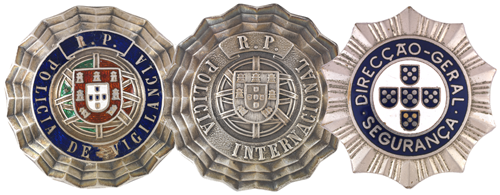
- The one on the left is the logo of PVDE
- Abbreviation: PVDE

Agency overview
- Formed: 1933
- Preceding agency: Portuguese International Police Political and Social Defense Police
- Dissolved: 1945
- Superseding agency: PIDE

Jurisdictional structure
- National agency: Portugal
- Operations jurisdiction: Portugal
- Governing body: Government of Portugal
- General nature: Civilian police
- Specialist jurisdiction: National border patrol, security, integrity

The State Surveillance and Defense Police (Polícia de Vigilância e Defesa do Estado) (PVDE) was a police force of the Portuguese State, which operated between 1933 and 1945. The PVDE was responsible for border surveillance, control of foreigners, immigration control, and state security.
