= Praça Martim Moniz =

Square in Lisbon, Portugal

- Public square
- {{{other_names}}}
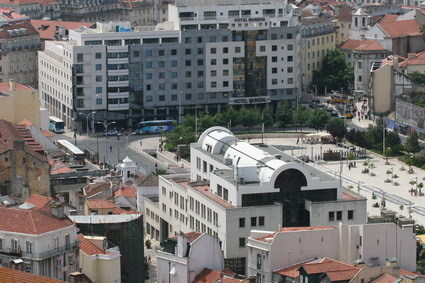
- Praça de Martim Moniz - panoramio
- Dedicated to: Martim Moniz
- Location: Praça Martim Moniz; Lisbon, Portugal
- Interactive map of Praça Martim Moniz
- Coordinates: 38°42′55.7″N 9°08′11.7″W

Praça Martim Moniz is a square in Lisbon, Portugal. It is named after Martim Moniz.

There are stops on the Lisbon Metro "Martim Moniz" and Lisbon tramway at the square.

== See also ==
- Procession of Our Lord of the Passion of Graça
