= Luís Carrilho =

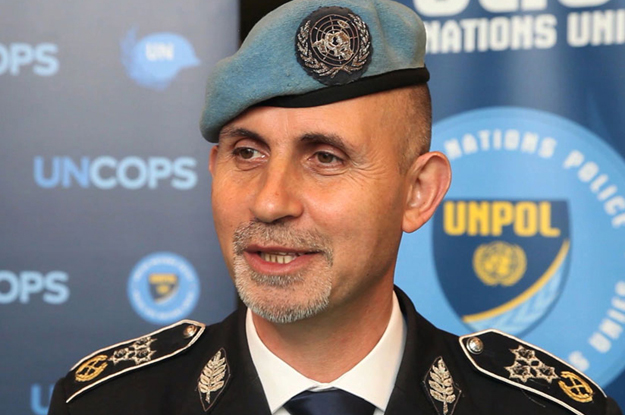
- Luís Carrilho at the UN Chiefs of Police Summit in June 2016.

United Nations Police Adviser
- In office November 2017 – December 2022
- Preceded by: Stefan Feller
- Succeeded by: Faisal Shahkar

Personal details
- Born: Luís Carrilho Porto, Portugal

Luís Carrilho served as the United Nations Police Adviser from November 2017 to December 2022.

== Career ==
Prior to this, Patrick Low held this role but is now promoted to commissioner of the UNPOL. He served previously as United Nations Police Commissioner in the Central African Republic (MINUSCA), in Haiti (MINUSTAH) and in Timor-Leste (UNMIT).

In 2014, Carrilho briefed the United Nations Security Council on the role of policing in peacekeeping. Carrilho advocated for more women in police and at the 2016 United Nations Chiefs of Police Summit that more "police keeping" is needed in UN peacekeeping operations.

== Other activities ==
- Center for International Peace Operations (ZIF), Member of the International Advisory Board

== Recognition ==
On 29 March 2012, Carrilho received a medal of merit for efforts to consolidate peace and security from the President of Timor-Leste, José Ramos Horta.
