= Autoridade de Segurança Alimentar e Económica =

Economic and Food Safety Authority Autoridade de Segurança Alimentar e Económica
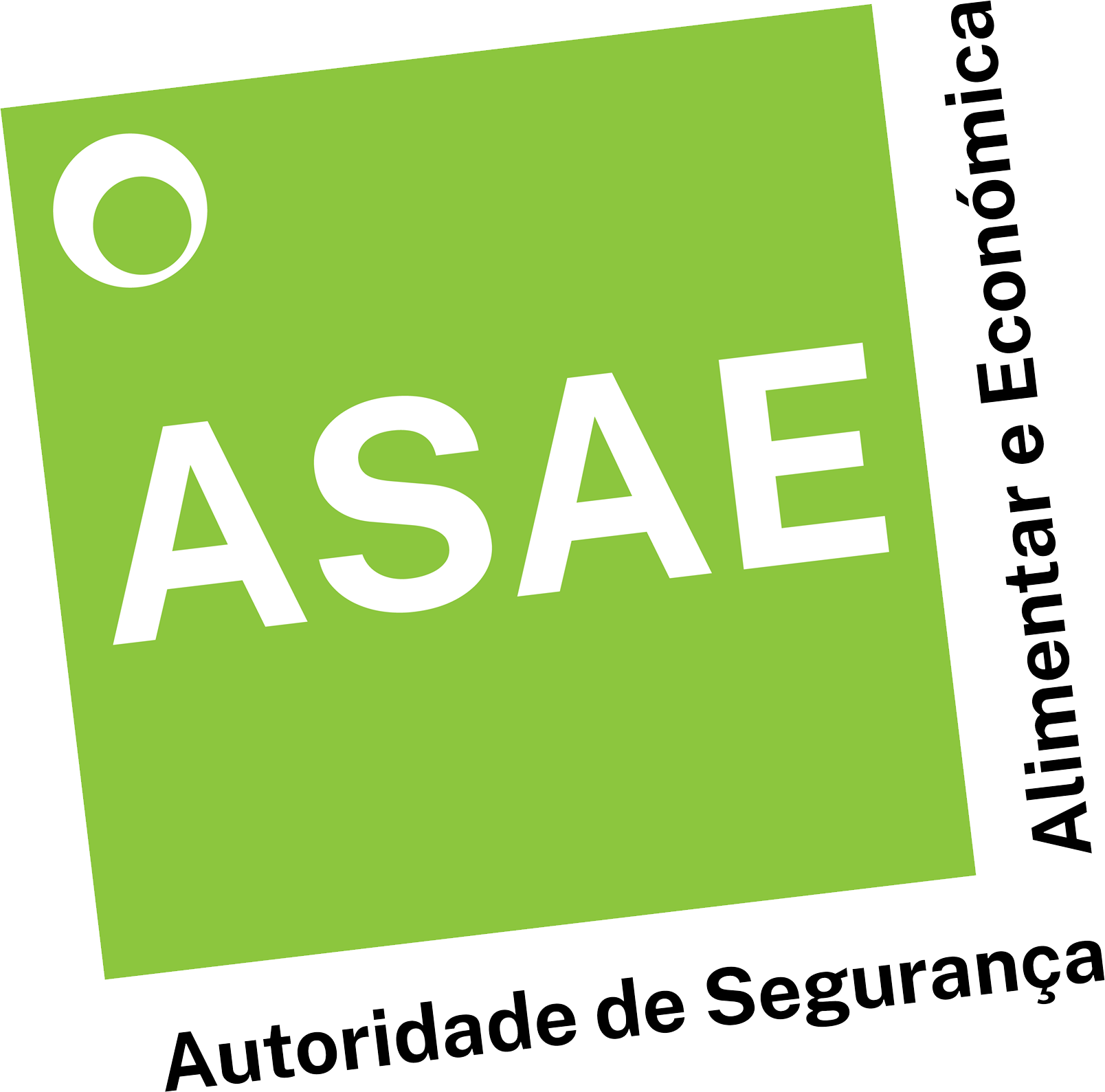
- Logo
- Abbreviation: ASAE

Agency overview
- Formed: 2005
- Preceding agency: Inspecção-Geral das Atividades Económicas

Jurisdictional structure
- National agency: Portugal
- Operations jurisdiction: Portugal
- Primary governing body: Government of Portugal
- Secondary governing body: Ministry of Economy
- General nature: Civilian police

Operational structure
- Headquarters: Lisbon
- 38°43′22.5156″N 9°9′12.1824″W
- Agency executive: Pedro Portugal Gaspar, National Director

Website
- asae.gov.pt

The Autoridade de Segurança Alimentar e Económica - ASAE (English: Economic and Food Safety Authority) is a specialized authority responsible for food safety and economic surveillance in Portugal. ASAE is a national authority, with administrative autonomy, that acts as a police and law enforcement body.
