= Polícia Judiciária =

Portugal's serious crime investigation police

Judiciary Police Polícia Judiciária
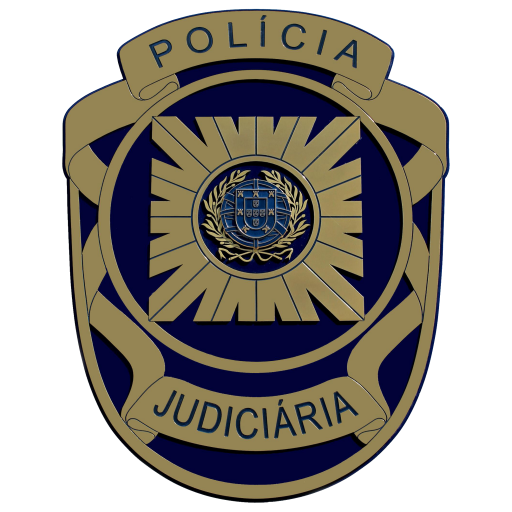
- Abbreviation: PJ

Agency overview
- Formed: 1945
- Preceding agency: Polícia de Investigação Criminal (PIC)

Jurisdictional structure
- National agency: Portugal
- Operations jurisdiction: Portugal
- Primary governing body: Government of Portugal
- Secondary governing body: Ministry of Justice (Portugal)
- General nature: Civilian police

Operational structure
- Headquarters: Rua Gomes Freire, Lisbon, Portugal
- 38°43′44.44″N 9°8′35.10″W
- Agency executive: Carlos Cabreiro, National Director

Website
- www.policiajudiciaria.pt

The Polícia Judiciária (European Portuguese: [puˈlisjɐ ʒuðiˈsjaɾjɐ]; PJ; English: Judicial Police) is the national criminal investigation police agency of Portugal, focused in fighting serious crimes, including homicides, kidnapping, organized crime, terrorism, illegal drug trade, corruption, cybercrime and financial crime. It is integrated into the Ministry of Justice, but operates under the supervision of the Public Ministry.

Several countries and territories that were once overseas provinces of Portugal maintain criminal investigation police forces modeled after the Portuguese one, with some of them retaining also the name Polícia Judiciária. These are the cases of Cabo Verde, Guinea-Bissau and Macau.

The Polícia Judiciária Militar (Military Judiciary Police) is a separate criminal investigation police agency that operates under the Ministry of National Defense. This agency is responsible for the investigation of military crimes and crimes committed among the Portuguese Armed Forces.

== History ==
The present Polícia Judiciária originates from a division of the old Polícia Civil (Civil Police). The Polícia Civil was founded on 2 July 1867, during the reign of Luís I of Portugal and changed its name to Polícia Cívica (Civic Police) in 1910. By decree of 29 August 1893, the Polícia de Investigação Judiciária e Preventiva (Judicial Investigation and Preventive Police) branch of the Polícia Civil was created. In 1922, this branch became the Polícia de Investigação Criminal (PIC, Criminal Investigation Police). In 1927, it became an autonomous police service under the Ministry of Justice. On 20 October 1945, the PIC changed its name to Polícia Judiciária.

== Organization ==
The Polícia Judiciária is headed by a National Director, appointed together by the Prime-Minister and the Minister of Justice.

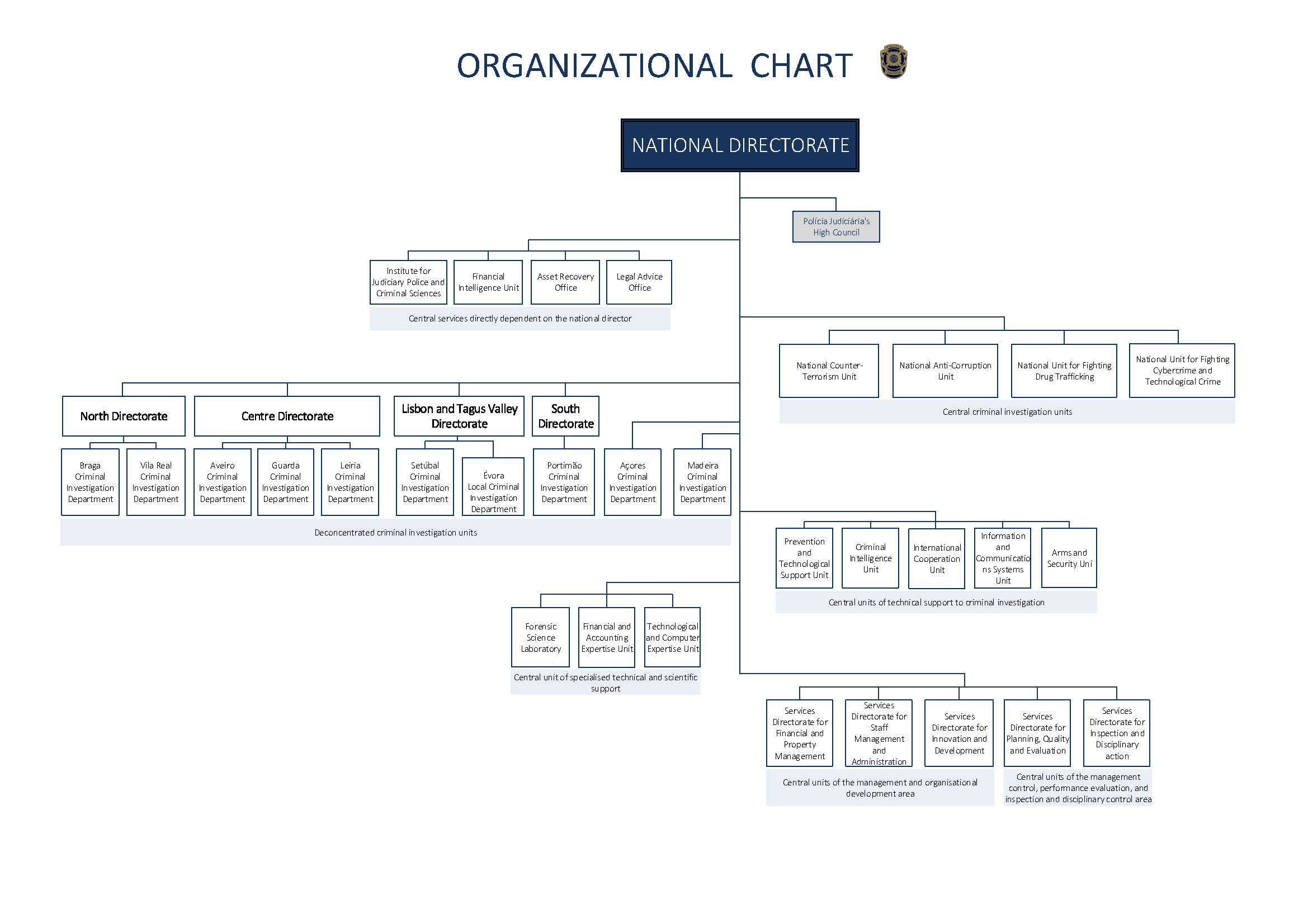
Internal organization chart

== Equipment ==
The Polícia Judiciária can use virtually any weapons of any caliber if necessary.

Model	Origin	Type	References
Glock 19	Austria	Semi-automatic pistol	
Glock 26	Austria	Semi-automatic pistol	
CZ Scorpion Evo 3	Czech Republic	Submachine gun	
Benelli M3	Italy	Shotgun	
Mossberg 500	United States	Shotgun	
IWI Tavor	Israel	Assault rifle	
