= List of female interior ministers =

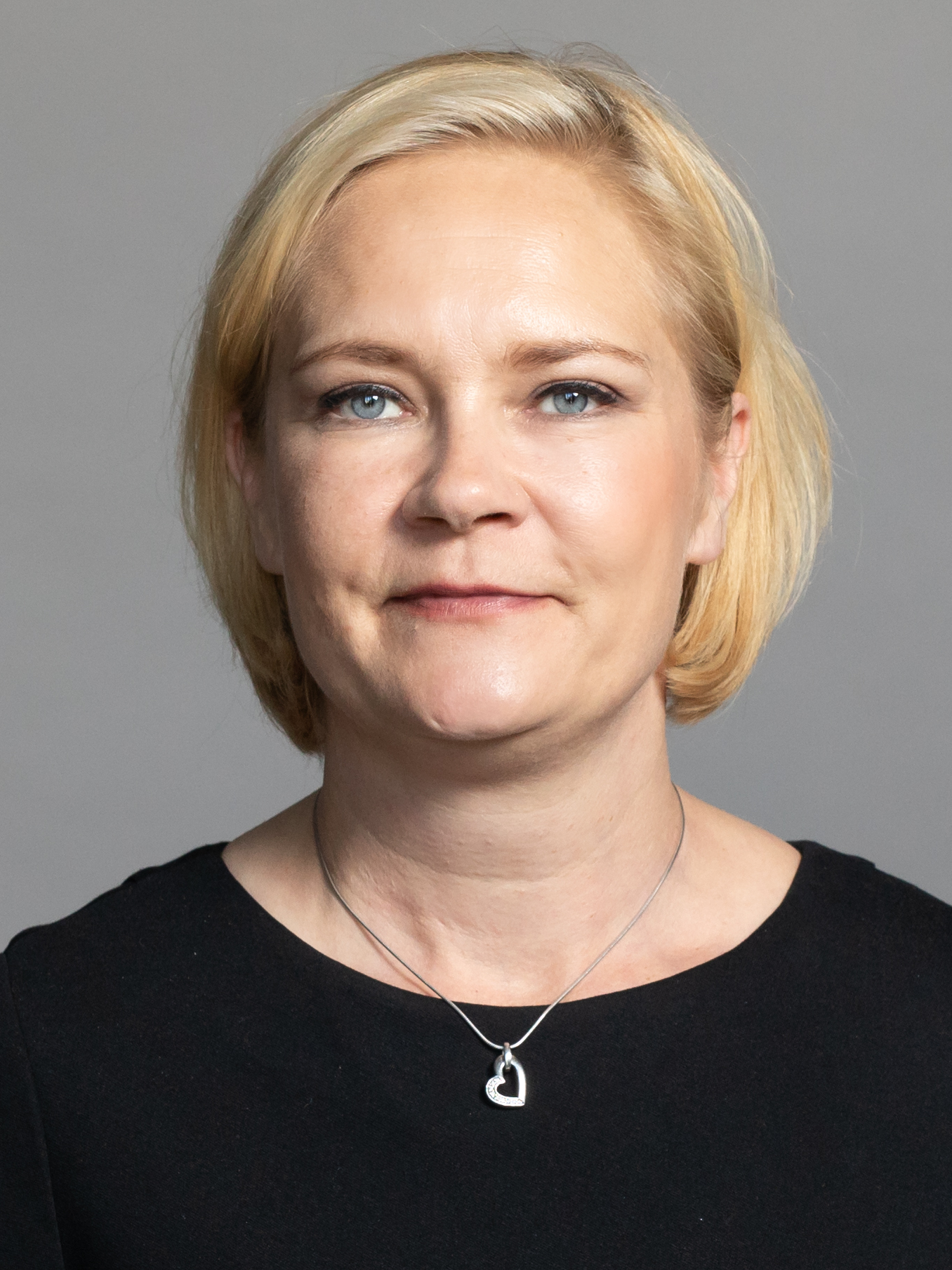
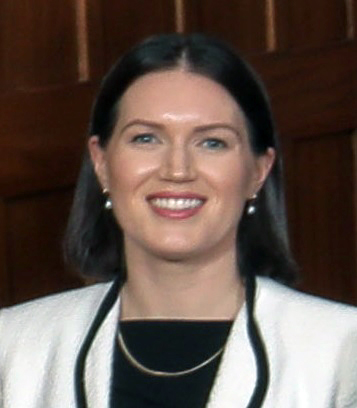
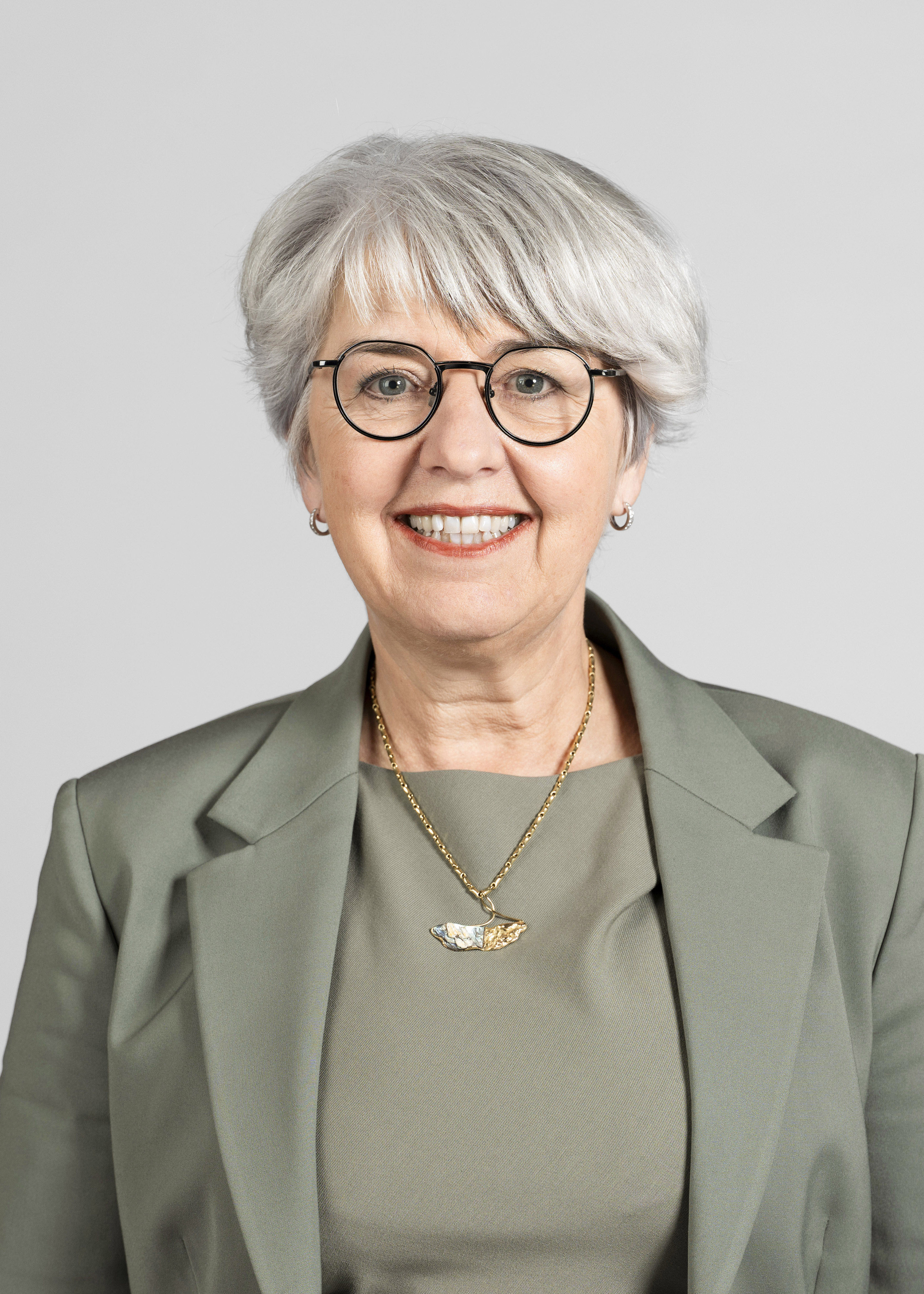
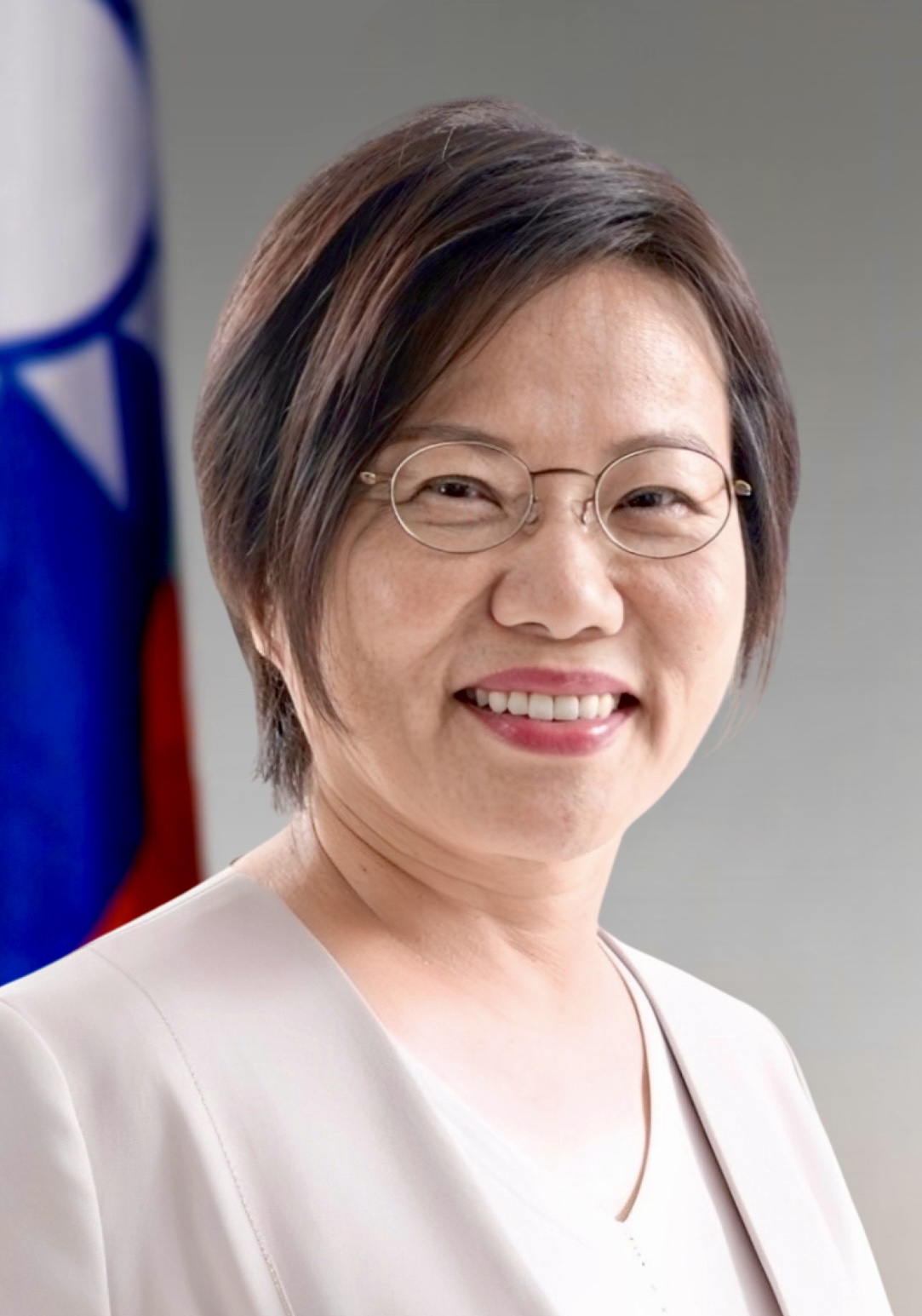
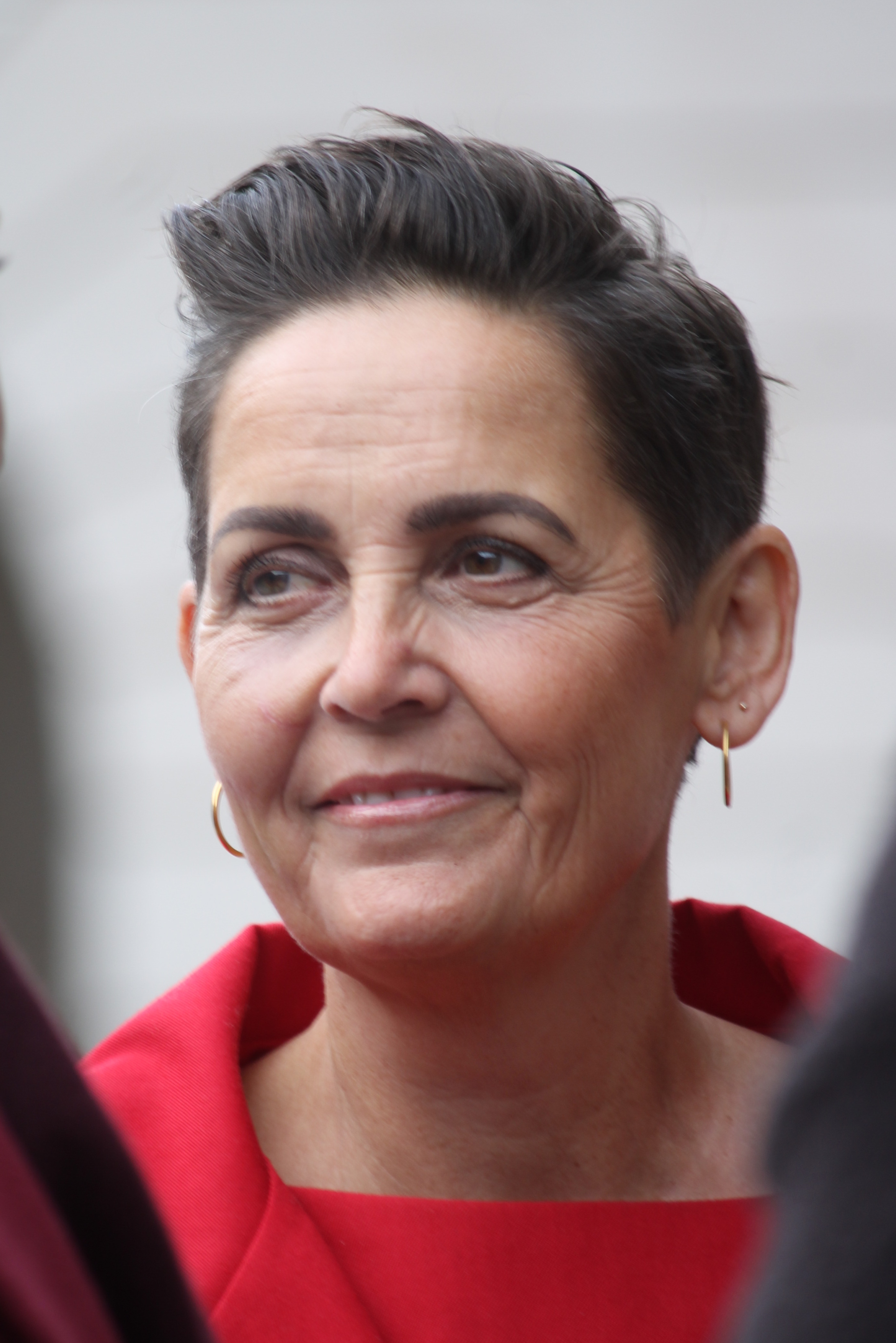
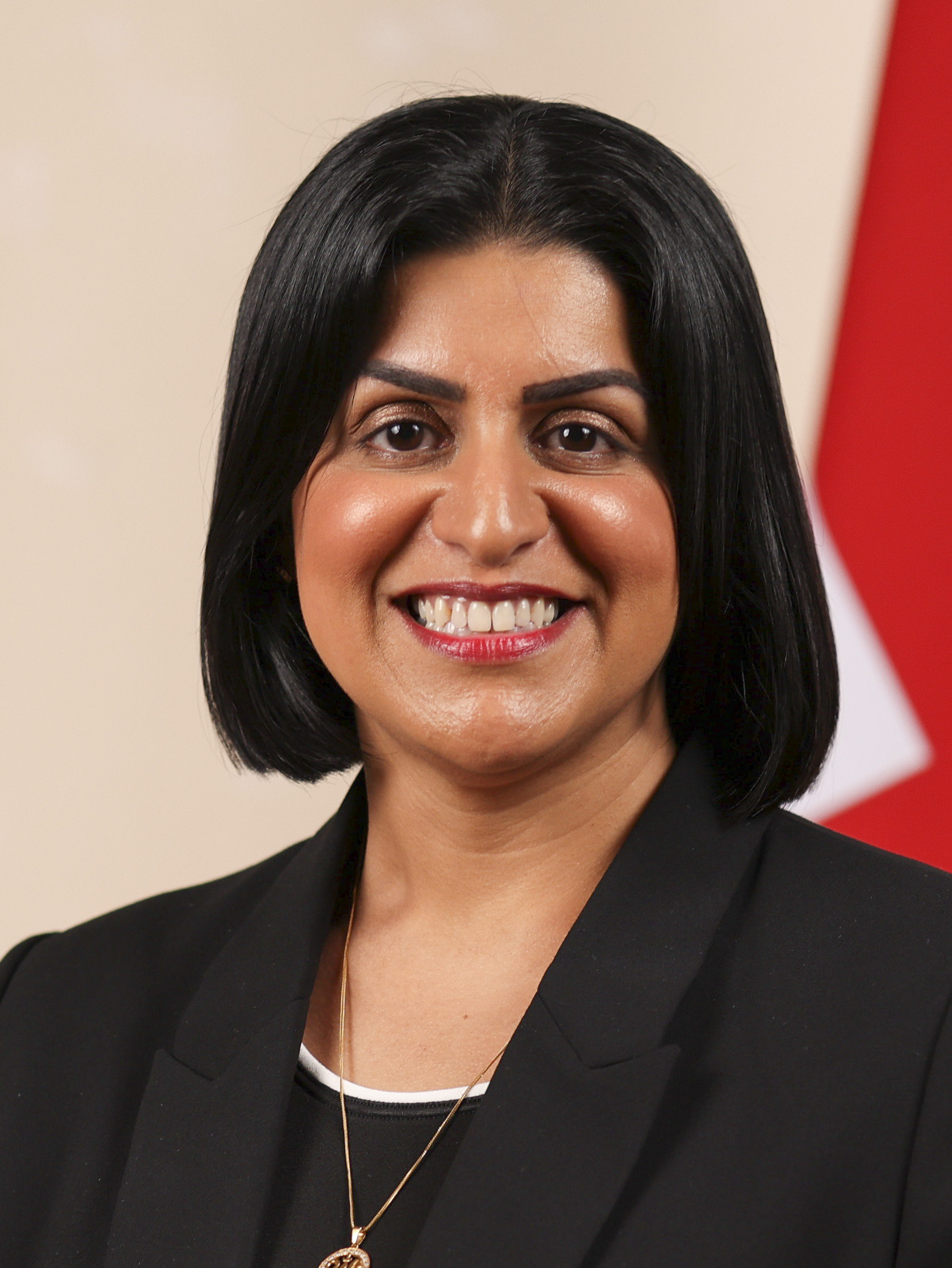
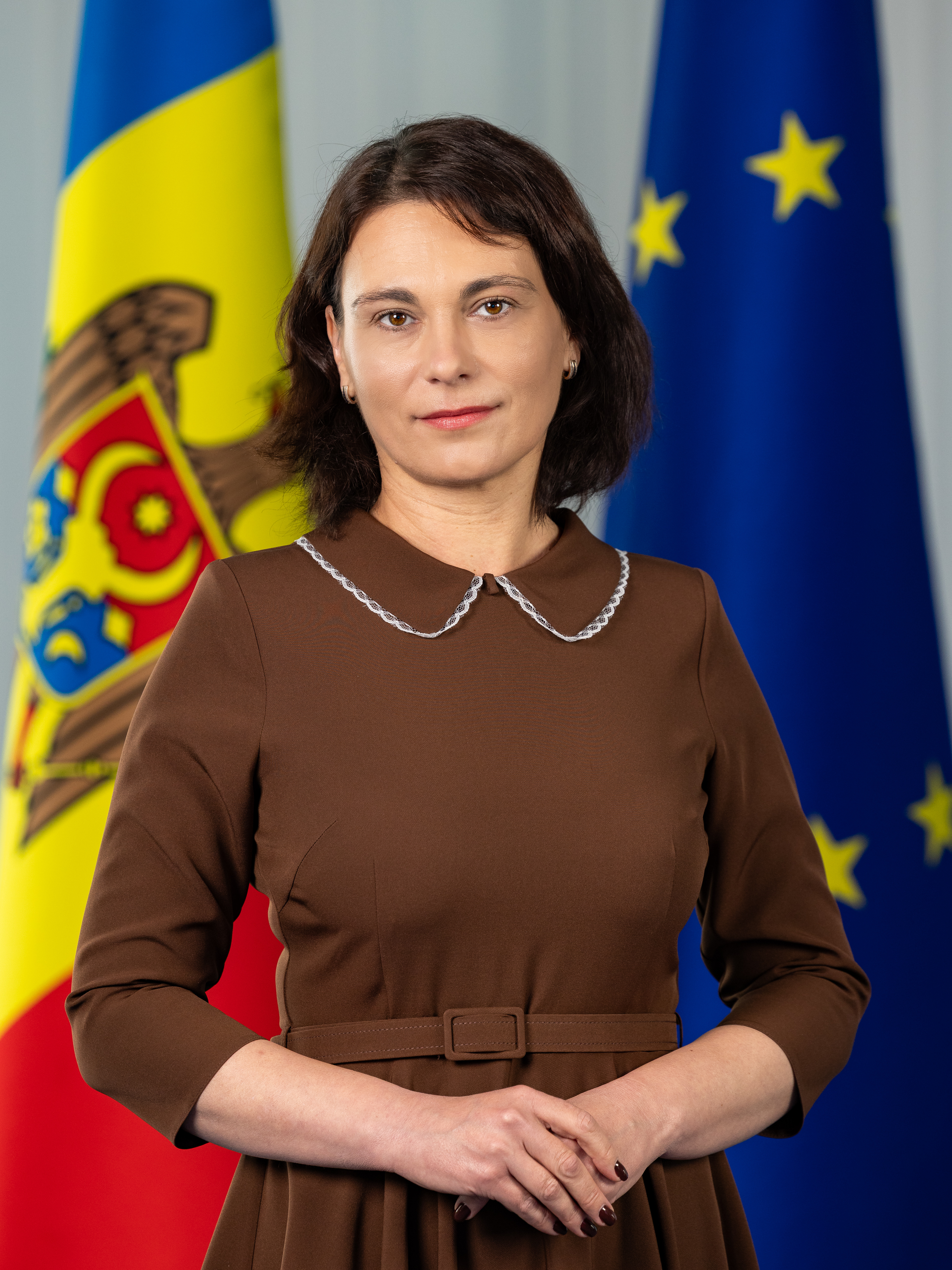
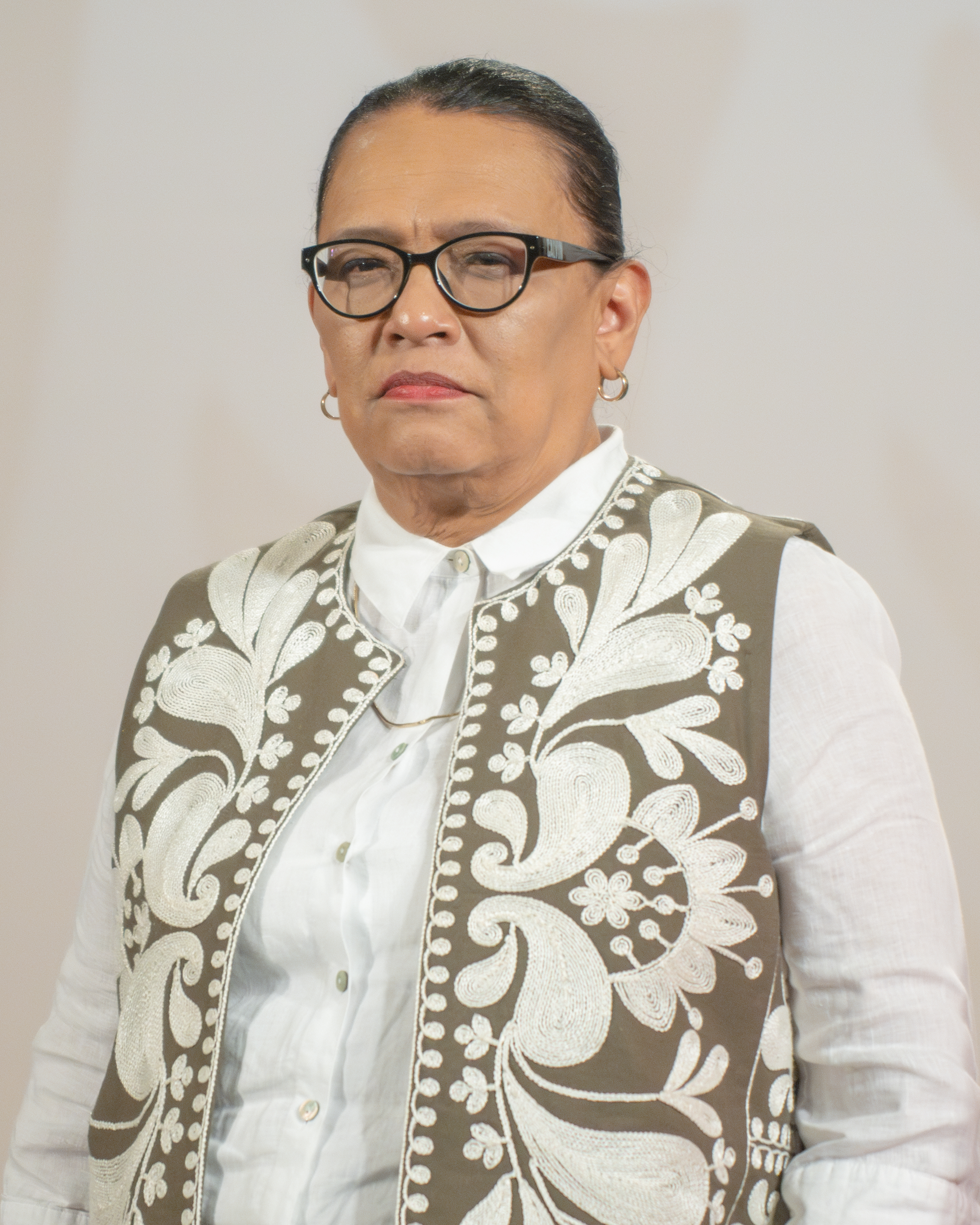
Incumbent female interior ministers of various countries
- Top row, from left to right:
  - Mari Rantanen, Minister of the Interior of Finland
  - Brooke van Velden, Minister of Internal Affairs of New Zealand
- Second row, from left to right:
  - Élisabeth Baume-Schneider, Head of the Federal Department of Home Affairs of Switzerland
  - Liu Shyh-fang, Minister of the Interior of Taiwan
- Third row, from left to right:
  - Pia Olsen Dyhr, Minister of the Interior of Denmark
  - Shabana Mahmood, Home Secretary of the United Kingdom
- Bottom row, from left to right:
  - Daniella Misail-Nichitin, Minister of Internal Affairs of Moldova
  - Rosa Icela Rodríguez, Secretary of the Interior of Mexico

Worldwide, 178 women have overseen an interior ministry or analogous government agency (Note: Specific names for the governmental agency in charge of internal affairs vary by country. For example, this body is called the Department of Homeland Security in the United States. Likewise, this agency is called the Ministry of Peace in Ethiopia.) responsible for overseeing a country's public safety and other domestic affairs. (Note: Not all countries have a ministry of the interior, as is the case with Greece and Israel.) Of that number, 90 women have been in charge of interior ministries or analogous agencies in Europe, 24 women have been in Africa, 21 have been in North America, 15 women have been in Oceania, 15 women have been in South America, and 13 women have been in Asia.

Qian Ying became the first female interior minister worldwide upon becoming China's minister of supervision in 1959. Seven years later, Mabel Moir James became the first female interior minister in North America, serving in this role in Dominica. In 1976, Clara Boscaglia became the first female European interior minister as Minister of the Interior and of Justice of San Marino. Africa would see the first woman serve in such a role when Kebatshabile Disele became Minister of Home Affairs of Botswana in 1979. Ten years later, Margaret Austin became Minister of Internal Affairs of New Zealand, the first such minister in Oceania. Finally, Ana Lucía Armijos became the first minister of the interior in South America in 1998 upon starting her tenure as Ecuador's ministry of the interior.

Norway is the country with the most female interior ministers, with 15 ministers of justice and public security. In contrast, various countries, such as Barbados and Palau, have only had one female interior minister or equivalent political officeholder.

The totals for this list include only female interior ministers or equivalents of sovereign states. Acting interior ministers, as well as administrators of public security and related affairs of dependent territories and subnational entities, are excluded from this list.

== List ==
The following list includes all women who have served as national interior ministers or analogous governmental officials. Politicians are listed based on the starting dates of their tenures.

denotes an incumbent interior minister or equivalent officeholder

Name	Image	Country	Continent	Mandate start	Mandate end	Term length
Qian Ying		China	Asia	1959	1960	1 year, 0 days
Mabel Moir James		Dominica	North America	1966	1970	4 years, 0 days
Indira Gandhi		India	Asia	9 November 1966	13 November 1966	4 days
Indira Gandhi		India	Asia	27 June 1970	5 February 1973	2 years, 223 days
Clara Boscaglia		San Marino	Europe	1976	1978	2 years, 0 days
Inger Louise Valle		Norway	Europe	8 October 1979	3 October 1980	361 days
Kebatshabile Disele		Botswana	Africa	1979	1984	4 years, 0 days
Harriet Andreassen		Norway	Europe	3 October 1980	14 October 1981	1 year, 11 days
Britta Schall Holberg		Denmark	Europe	10 September 1982	12 March 1986	3 years, 183 days
Kaisa Raatikainen		Finland	Europe	1 December 1984	30 April 1987	2 years, 150 days
Rita Sinon		Seychelles	Africa	1986	1989	3 years, 0 days
Margaret Austin		New Zealand	Oceania	8 August 1989	4 September 1990	1 year, 27 days
Ien Dales		Netherlands	Europe	7 November 1989	10 January 1994	4 years, 64 days
Lagle Parek		Estonia	Europe	21 October 1992	27 November 1993	1 year, 37 days
Birte Weiss		Denmark	Europe	25 January 1993	20 October 1997	4 years, 268 days
Ruth Dreifuss		Switzerland	Europe	10 March 1993	31 December 2002	9 years, 296 days
Dieuwke de Graaff-Nauta		Netherlands	Europe	27 May 1994	22 August 1994	87 days
Meral Akşener		Turkey	Asia	8 November 1996	30 June 1997	234 days
Laura Chinchilla		Costa Rica	North America	12 November 1996	8 May 1998	1 year, 177 days
Laura Chinchilla		Costa Rica	North America	30 March 2008	14 April 2008	15 days
Yeh Chin-fong		Taiwan	Asia	15 May 1997	5 February 1998	266 days
Francisca Pereira		Guinea Bissau	Africa	6 June 1997	3 December 1998	1 year, 180 days
Ragnhild Queseth Haarstad		Norway	Europe	17 October 1997	16 March 1999	1 year, 150 days
Ana Lucía Armijos		Ecuador	South America	10 August 1998	15 February 1999	189 days
Rosa Russo Iervolino		Italy	Europe	21 October 1998	22 December 1999	1 year, 62 days
Vasso Papandreou		Greece	Europe	19 February 1999	20 March 2000	1 year, 30 days
Vasso Papandreou		Greece	Europe	13 April 2000	24 October 2001	1 year, 194 days
Dosta Dimovska		North Macedonia	Europe	22 December 1999	13 May 2001	1 year, 142 days
Francesca Michelotti		San Marino	Europe	2000	25 June 2002	2 years, 175 days
Karen Jespersen		Denmark	Europe	23 February 2000	27 November 2001	1 year, 277 days
Sylvia Brustad		Norway	Europe	21 March 2000	19 October 2001	1 year, 212 days
Chang Po-ya		Taiwan	Asia	20 May 2000	1 February 2001	257 days
Urmila Joella-Sewnundun		Suriname	North America	12 August 2000	12 August 2005	5 years, 0 days
Vera Sofía Rubi		Honduras	North America	2001	27 January 2002	1 year, 26 days
Mia Mottley		Barbados	North America	28 August 2001	18 February 2006	4 years, 174 days
Erna Solberg		Norway	Europe	19 October 2001	17 October 2005	3 years, 363 days
Sarah Flood-Beaubrun		Saint Lucia	North America	11 December 2001	12 January 2004	2 years, 32 days
Mónika Lamperth		Hungary	Europe	27 May 2002	30 June 2007	5 years, 34 days
Emma Rossi		San Marino	Europe	25 June 2002	17 December 2002	175 days
Cristina Fontes Lima		Cape Verde	Africa	19 October 2002	3 April 2004	1 year, 167 days
Nosiviwe Mapisa-Nqakula		South Africa	Africa	29 April 2004	21 April 2009	4 years, 357 days
Liese Prokop		Austria	Europe	22 December 2004	31 December 2006	2 years, 9 days
Rosalia Nghidinwa		Namibia	Africa	21 March 2005	4 December 2012	7 years, 258 days
Anne McLellan		Canada	North America	4 April 2005	6 February 2006	308 days
Gail Teixeira		Guyana	South America	31 May 2005	8 September 2006	1 year, 100 days
Anna Kachikho		Malawi	Africa	31 July 2005	1 June 2006	305 days
Åslaug Haga		Norway	Europe	17 October 2005	21 September 2007	1 year, 339 days
Alicia Muñoz		Bolivia	South America	22 January 2006	23 January 2007	1 year, 1 day
Olga Gólcher		Panama	North America	28 January 2006	1 September 2007	1 year, 216 days
Valeria Ciavatta		San Marino	Europe	27 July 2006	9 July 2008	1 year, 348 days
Pilar Mazzetti		Peru	South America	28 July 2006	23 February 2007	210 days
Gordana Jankuloska		North Macedonia	Europe	26 August 2006	12 May 2015	8 years, 259 days
Ana Isabel Morales		Nicaragua	North America	10 January 2007	16 January 2017	10 years, 6 days
Guusje ter Horst		Netherlands	Europe	22 February 2007	23 February 2010	3 years, 1 day
Daisy Tourné		Uruguay	South America	8 March 2007	5 June 2009	2 years, 89 days
Adela de Torrebiarte		Guatemala	North America	27 March 2007	1 July 2008	1 year, 96 days
Anne Holmlund		Finland	Europe	19 April 2007	22 June 2011	4 years, 64 days
Michèle Alliot-Marie		France	Europe	18 May 2007	23 June 2009	2 years, 36 days
Jacqui Smith		United Kingdom	Europe	28 June 2007	5 June 2009	1 year, 342 days
Ma Wen		China	Asia	30 August 2007	16 March 2013	5 years, 198 days
Magnhild Meltveit Kleppa		Norway	Europe	21 September 2007	20 October 2009	2 years, 29 days
Janina del Vecchio Ugalde		Costa Rica	North America	14 April 2008	8 May 2010	2 years, 24 days
Maria Fekter		Austria	Europe	1 July 2008	21 April 2011	2 years, 294 days
Katarina Kresal		Slovenia	Europe	24 November 2008	19 August 2011	2 years, 268 days
Sahara Khatun		Bangladesh	Asia	6 January 2009	15 September 2012	3 years, 253 days
Janet Napolitano		United States	North America	21 January 2009	6 September 2013	4 years, 228 days
Sandra Pierantozzi		Palau	Oceania	21 January 2009	19 April 2010	1 year, 88 days
Mercedes Cabanillas		Peru	South America	19 February 2009	11 July 2009	142 days
Linda Abu Meri		Latvia	Europe	12 March 2009	17 February 2011	1 year, 342 days
Karen Ellemann		Denmark	Europe	7 April 2009	23 February 2010	322 days
Karen Ellemann		Denmark	Europe	28 June 2015	28 November 2016	1 year, 153 days
Nkosazana Dlamini-Zuma		South Africa	Africa	22 April 2009	3 October 2012	3 years, 164 days
Annemie Turtelboom		Belgium	Europe	17 July 2009	6 December 2011	2 years, 142 days
Cécile Manorohanta		Madagascar	Africa	7 September 2009	26 March 2011	1 year, 200 days
Liv Signe Navarsete		Norway	Europe	20 October 2009	16 October 2013	3 years, 361 days
Adja Satú Camará		Guinea-Bissau	Africa	28 October 2009	27 August 2011	1 year, 303 days
Roxana Méndez		Panama	North America	15 April 2010	20 August 2012	2 years, 127 days
Theresa May		United Kingdom	Europe	12 May 2010	13 July 2016	6 years, 62 days
Theresa Makoni		Zimbabwe	Africa	24 June 2010	11 September 2013	3 years, 79 days
Marisa Morais		Cape Verde	Africa	18 March 2011	22 April 2016	5 years, 35 days
Johanna Mikl-Leitner		Austria	Europe	21 April 2011	21 April 2016	5 years, 0 days
Päivi Räsänen		Finland	Europe	22 June 2011	29 May 2015	3 years, 341 days
Pelenike Isaia		Tuvalu	Oceania	23 September 2011	2 August 2013	1 year, 313 days
Margrethe Vestager		Denmark	Europe	3 October 2011	2 September 2014	2 years, 334 days
Annamaria Cancellieri		Italy	Europe	16 November 2011	28 April 2013	1 year, 163 days
Joëlle Milquet		Belgium	Europe	6 December 2011	22 July 2014	2 years, 228 days
Amy Adams		New Zealand	Oceania	14 December 2011	3 April 2012	111 days
Liesbeth Spies		Netherlands	Europe	16 December 2011	5 November 2012	325 days
Eleni Mavrou		Cyprus	Europe	20 March 2012	28 February 2013	345 days
Naledi Pandor		South Africa	Africa	4 October 2012	6 May 2014	1 year, 214 days
Pendukeni Iivula-Ithana		Namibia	Africa	4 December 2012	1 February 2018	5 years, 59 days
Gülsün Yücel		Northern Cyprus	Europe	13 June 2013	2 September 2013	81 days
Petya Parvanova		Bulgaria	Europe	13 March 2013	29 May 2013	77 days
Hanna Birna Kristjánsdóttir		Iceland	Europe	23 May 2013	4 December 2014	1 year, 195 days
Charmaine Scotty		Nauru	Oceania	13 June 2013	28 August 2019	6 years, 76 days
Tsandzile Dlamini		Eswatini	Africa	4 November 2013	5 September 2018	4 years, 305 days
Sheikh Hasina		Bangladesh	Asia	21 November 2013	14 July 2015	1 year, 235 days
Sanae Takaichi		Japan	Asia	3 September 2014	3 August 2017	2 years, 334 days
Sanae Takaichi		Japan	Asia	11 September 2019	16 September 2020	1 year, 5 days
Vesna Györkös Žnidar		Slovenia	Europe	18 September 2014	13 September 2018	3 years, 360 days
Teresa Piotrowska		Poland	Europe	22 September 2014	16 November 2015	1 year, 55 days
Anabela Rodrigues		Portugal	Europe	19 November 2014	30 October 2015	345 days
Ólöf Nordal		Iceland	Europe	4 December 2014	11 January 2017	2 years, 38 days
Rumyana Bachvarova		Bulgaria	Europe	11 March 2015	27 January 2017	1 year, 322 days
Rose Akol		Uganda	Africa	16 November 2015	Incumbent	10 years, 325 days
Constança Urbano de Sousa		Portugal	Europe	26 November 2015	18 October 2017	1 year, 326 days
Daisy Alik-Momotaro		Marshall Islands	Oceania	11 January 2016	28 January 2016	17 days
Amenta Matthew		Marshall Islands	Oceania	28 January 2016	13 January 2020	3 years, 350 days
Paula Risikko		Finland	Europe	22 June 2016	5 February 2018	1 year, 228 days
Amber Rudd		United Kingdom	Europe	13 July 2016	29 April 2018	1 year, 290 days
Grace Chiumia		Malawi	Africa	6 September 2016	24 October 2017	1 year, 48 days
Mitcy Larue		Seychelles	Africa	29 October 2016	7 July 2017	251 days
Carmen Dan		Romania	Europe	4 January 2017	15 July 2019	2 years, 192 days
María Amelia Coronel		Nicaragua	North America	16 January 2017	Incumbent	9 years, 264 days
Dominique Hasler		Liechtenstein	Europe	30 March 2017	25 March 2021	3 years, 360 days
Hlengiwe Mkhize		South Africa	Africa	31 March 2017	17 October 2017	200 days
Seiko Noda		Japan	Asia	3 August 2017	2 October 2018	1 year, 60 days
Ayanda Dlodlo		South Africa	Africa	17 October 2017	27 February 2018	134 days
Cecilia Chazama		Malawi	Africa	24 October 2017	7 November 2018	1 year, 14 days
Kajsa Ollongren		Netherlands	Europe	26 October 2017	1 November 2019	2 years, 6 days
Kajsa Ollongren		Netherlands	Europe	14 April 2020	10 January 2022	1 year, 271 days
Tracey Martin		New Zealand	Oceania	26 October 2017	6 November 2020	8 years, 346 days
Kirstjen Nielsen		United States	North America	6 December 2017	7 April 2019	1 year, 122 days
Elona Gjebrea		Albania	Europe	2017	2020	3 years
ʻAkosita Lavulavu		Tonga	Oceania	18 January 2018	11 April 2018	83 days
Denisa Saková		Slovakia	Europe	26 April 2018	20 March 2020	1 year, 329 days
Losaline Ma'asi		Tonga	Oceania	26 June 2018	21 January 2019	209 days
Nancy Patricia Gutiérrez		Colombia	South America	7 August 2018	13 February 2020	1 year, 190 days
María Paula Romo		Ecuador	South America	31 August 2018	24 November 2020	2 years, 85 days
Muferiat Kamil		Ethiopia	Africa	16 October 2018	6 October 2021	2 years, 355 days
Lindiwe Dlamini		Eswatini	Africa	2 November 2018	16 September 2026	7 years, 318 days
Katri Raik		Estonia	Europe	26 November 2018	29 April 2019	154 days
Olga Sánchez Cordero		Mexico	North America	1 December 2018	26 August 2021	2 years, 268 days
Taina Bofferding		Luxembourg	Europe	5 December 2018	17 November 2023	4 years, 347 days
Ingvil Smines Tybring-Gjedde		Norway	Europe	22 January 2019	24 January 2020	1 year, 2 days
Raya Haffar El Hassan		Lebanon	Asia	31 January 2019	21 January 2020	355 days
Elżbieta Witek		Poland	Europe	4 June 2019	9 August 2019	66 days
Maria Ohisalo		Finland	Europe	6 June 2019	19 November 2021	2 years, 166 days
Astrid Krag		Denmark	Europe	27 June 2019	21 January 2021	1 year, 208 days
Priti Patel		United Kingdom	Europe	24 July 2019	6 September 2022	3 years, 44 days
Rita Tamašunienė		Lithuania	Europe	7 August 2019	7 December 2020	1 year, 122 days
Luciana Lamorgese		Italy	Europe	5 September 2019	22 October 2022	3 years, 47 days
Alicia Arango		Colombia	South America	13 February 2020	22 December 2020	313 days
Janaina Tewaney		Panama	North America	6 March 2020	10 October 2022	2 years, 218 days
Annelies Verlinden		Belgium	Europe	1 October 2020	3 February 2025	4 years, 125 days
Jan Tinetti		New Zealand	Oceania	20 November 2020	1 February 2023	2 years, 73 days
Agnė Bilotaitė		Lithuania	Europe	7 December 2020	12 December 2024	4 years, 5 days
Sabine Monauni		Liechtenstein	Europe	25 March 2021	10 April 2025	4 years, 16 days
Karen Andrews		Australia	Oceania	29 March 2021	23 May 2022	1 year, 55 days
Ayelet Shaked		Israel	Asia	13 June 2021	29 December 2022	1 year, 199 days
Alexandra Vela		Ecuador	South America	14 July 2021	29 March 2022	258 days
Ana Revenco		Moldova	Europe	6 August 2021	14 July 2023	1 year, 342 days
Arsénia Massingue		Mozambique	Africa	11 November 2021	28 August 2023	1 year, 290 days
Krista Mikkonen		Finland	Europe	19 November 2021	20 June 2023	1 year, 213 days
Nancy Faeser		Germany	Europe	8 December 2021	6 May 2025	3 years, 149 days
Hanke Bruins Slot		Netherlands	Europe	10 January 2022	5 September 2023	1 year, 258 days
Izkia Siches		Chile	America	11 March 2022	6 September 2022	179 days
Tatjana Bobnar		Slovenia	Europe	1 June 2022	14 December 2022	196 days
Clare O'Neil		Australia	Oceania	1 June 2022	29 July 2024	2 years, 58 days
Suella Braverman		United Kingdom	Europe	6 September 2022	19 October 2022	43 days
Suella Braverman		United Kingdom	Europe	25 October 2022	13 November 2023	1 year, 19 days
Carolina Tohá		Chile	America	6 September 2022	4 March 2025	2 years, 179 days
Sanja Ajanovič Hovnik; Minister pro tempore		Slovenia	Europe	14 December 2022	21 February 2023	69 days
Sophie Løhde		Denmark	Europe	15 December 2022	3 June 2026	3 years, 170 days
Barbara Edmonds		New Zealand	Oceania	1 February 2023	27 November 2023	299 days
Ester Molné Soldevila		Andorra	Europe	17 May 2023	Incumbent	3 years, 143 days
Luisa María Alcalde Luján		Mexico	North America	20 June 2023	30 September 2024	1 year, 102 days
Mari Rantanen		Finland	Europe	20 June 2023	Incumbent	3 years, 109 days
Niki Kerameus		Greece	Europe	27 June 2023	14 June 2024	353 days
Brooke van Velden		New Zealand	Oceania	27 November 2023	Incumbent	2 years, 314 days
Élisabeth Baume-Schneider		Switzerland	Europe	1 January 2024	Incumbent	2 years, 279 days
Margarida Blasco		Portugal	Europe	2 April 2024	5 June 2025	1 year, 64 days
Liu Shyh-fang		Taiwan	Asia	20 May 2024	Incumbent	2 years, 140 days
Judith Uitermark		Netherlands	Europe	2 July 2024	22 August 2025	1 year, 51 days
Yvette Cooper		United Kingdom	Europe	5 July 2024	5 September 2025	1 year, 62 days
Rosa Icela Rodríguez		Mexico	North America	1 October 2024	Incumbent	2 years, 6 days
Daniella Misail-Nichitin		Moldova	Europe	19 November 2024	Incumbent	1 year, 322 days
Arpine Sargsyan		Armenia	Asia	20 November 2024	Incumbent	1 year, 321 days
Kristi Noem		United States	North America	25 January 2025	24 March 2026	1 year, 58 days
Maria Lúcia Amaral		Portugal	Europe	5 June 2025	10 February 2026	250 days
Shabana Mahmood		United Kingdom	Europe	5 September 2025	Incumbent	1 year, 32 days
Pia Olsen Dyhr		Denmark	Europe	3 June 2026	Incumbent	126 days

== See also ==
- List of current interior ministers
- Women in law enforcement

Additional lists of female ministers

- List of female defence ministers
- List of female finance ministers
- List of female foreign ministers
- List of female justice ministers
