= Margarida Blasco =

Portuguese judge and politician (born 1956)

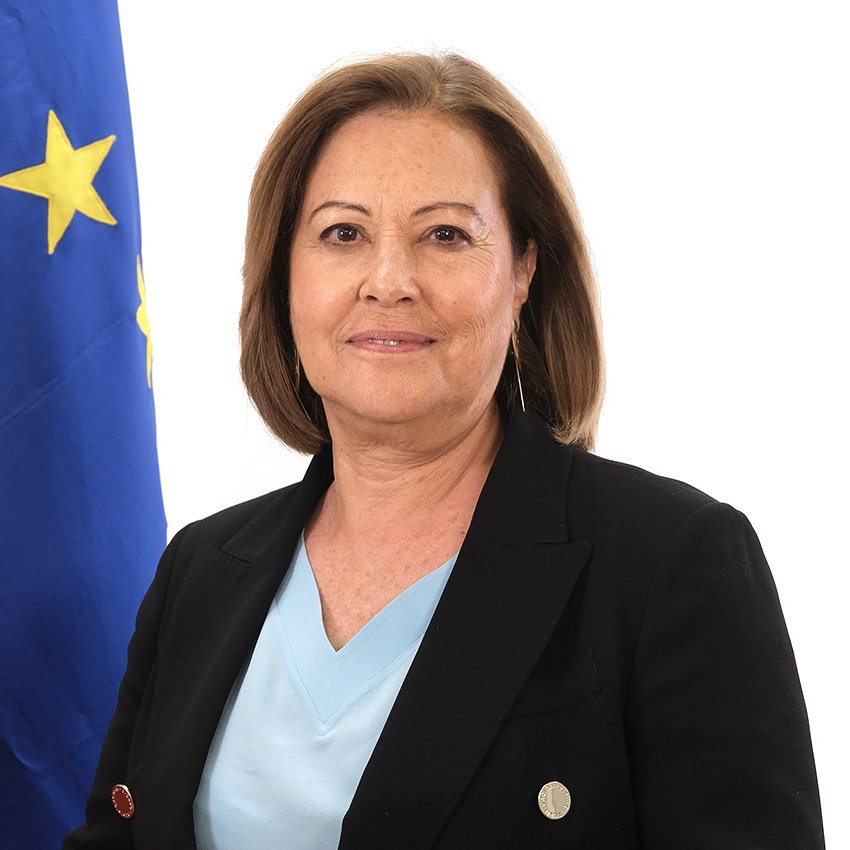
- Official portrait, 2024

Minister of Home Affairs
- In office 2 April 2024 – 5 June 2025
- Prime Minister: Luís Montenegro
- Preceded by: José Luís Carneiro
- Succeeded by: Maria Lúcia Amaral

Member of the Supreme Court of Justice
- In office 8 May 2019 – 30 August 2021
- President: António Piçarra; Henrique Araújo

Inspector General of Home Affairs
- In office 9 February 2012 – 4 May 2019
- Minister: Miguel Macedo; Anabela Miranda Rodrigues; João Calvão da Silva; Constança Urbano de Sousa; Eduardo Cabrita
- Preceded by: Mário Varges Gomes
- Succeeded by: Anabela Cabral Ferreira

Director-General of the Security Information Service
- In office 2004–2005
- Prime Minister: José Manuel Barroso; Pedro Santana Lopes
- Preceded by: Domingos Jerónimo
- Succeeded by: Júlio Pereira

Personal details
- Born: 25 July 1956 (age 70) Castelo Branco, Portugal
- Party: Independent
- Education: University of Lisbon
- Occupation: judge • politician

Maria Margarida Blasco Martins Augusto (born 25 July 1956) is a Portuguese judge and politician. She was Minister of Internal Administration from 2024 until 2025, in the XXIV Constitutional Government, led by Luís Montenegro.

Before her ministerial appointment, Blasco served as General Director of the Security Information Service from 2004 to 2005 and was Inspector General of the Home Affairs from 2012 to 2019. Between 2019 and 2021, she was a member of the Supreme Court of Justice, retiring in 2021.

== Early life ==
Blasco was born on 25 July 1956 in Castelo Branco. In 1978, she graduated from the Faculty of Law at the University of Lisbon.

== Career ==
Between 1987 and 1991 she was chief of staff of the Assistant Secretary of State to the Minister of Justice. She was then, from 1991 to 1993, general coordinator of cooperation with Portuguese-speaking countries at the Ministry of Justice. After leaving this position, she became Vice-President of the Institute for Portuguese Cooperation between 1994 and 1996.

She was general director of the Security Information Service, being the first woman to hold the office from 2004 to 2005, and was Inspector General of Internal Administration (IGAI) between 2012 and 2019. At SIS, she initiated cases related to police abuse, especially with Polícia de Segurança Pública agents, which ended with questioning about excessive violence and racism by security forces.

Between 2019 and 2021 she was a member of the Supreme Court of Justice, having retired in 2021. When she was a judge, she dealt with cases involving the 1980 Camarate plane crash, Dona Branca, and Fernando Negrão.
