= Patricia Castaneda =

Patricia Castañeda can refer to:

- Patricia Castañeda (b. 1977), Colombian actress
- Patricia Castañeda Miyamoto (b. 1990), Mexican swimmer
- Nancy Patricia Gutiérrez Castañeda (b. 1963), Colombian Senator
