= Adja Satú Camará =

Politician from Guinea-Bissau

Adja Satú Camará Pinto is a politician from Guinea-Bissau. A health administrator and veteran PAICS politician, she served as a PAICS Deputy in the National People's Assembly between 1977 and 2008. She was Minister of the Interior from 2009 to 2010. In 2016 she left PAICS, joining Madem G15 in 2018. In 2019 she was elected second vice-president of the National Popular Assembly. In 2020 she was appointed the fourth deputy speaker of the Economic Community of West African States (ECOWAS).

== Life ==
Adja Satú Camará was born in N’Tuhana, Buba Sector, Quinara Region. She was the daughter of Mamadú Camará and Mariama Sambú. She joined the African Party for the Independence of Guinea and Cape Verde (PAICS) and participated in the Guinea-Bissau War of Independence. In 1964 she undertook military training in Ghana, and in 1965 trained in the USSR as an auxiliary combat nurse. After various health administration posts Camará was appointed head of health services at Bafatá hospital after independence.

Moving into politics, Adja Satú Camará became a Deputy in the National People's Assembly in 1977. She was also governor of Bafatá Region from 1985 to 1990, Cacheu Region from 1990 to 1995, and Gabú Region from 1997 to 1999. She kept her seat in the National Popular Assembly in the 1994 Guinea-Bissau general election, the first multi-party leguislative elections, and was re-elected in 1999 and 2004. From 1999 to 2006 she was national coordinator of the União Democrática das Mulheres da Guiné (UDEMU), the women's wing of PAICS, succeeded by Eva Gomes. She was Vice-President of PAICS from 2003 to 2007, and a member of the State Council in 2004.

Adja Satú Camará Pinto was Minister of the Interior from 2009 to 2010. She was then appointed Chief of Staff of the President of the Republic.

Camara Pinto later served as the Fourth Deputy Speaker of the Parliament of the Economic Community of West African States (ECOWAS).
