= Interior minister =

Minister in charge of interior or home affairs

An interior minister or home minister (also known as minister of internal affairs or minister of home affairs) is a cabinet official position that is responsible for the state's internal affairs, such as public security, civil registration and identification, emergency management, supervision of regional and local governments, conduct of elections, public administration and immigration (including passport issuance) matters. This position is head of a department that is often called an interior ministry, a ministry of internal affairs, the Home Office or a ministry of home affairs. In some jurisdictions, there is no department called an "interior ministry", but the relevant responsibilities are allocated to other departments.

== Remit and role ==
In some countries, the public security portfolio belongs to a separate ministry (under a title like "ministry of public order" or "ministry of security"), with the interior ministry being limited to control over local governments, public administration, elections and similar matters. Notable examples include Greece (Ministry of Citizen Protection) and Israel (Ministry of Public Security). In some jurisdictions, matters relating to the maintenance of law and order and the administration of justice are the responsibility of a separate justice ministry.

In countries with a federal constitution, interior ministers will often be found at both the federal and sub-national levels. Similarly, autonomous entities and dependent territories may also have interior ministers.

== By country ==
=== Australia ===
In Australia, the Department of Home Affairs is responsible for central coordination, and strategy and policy leadership in relation to:

- Cyber and critical infrastructure resilience and security
- Immigration
- Border security and management
- Counter-terrorism
- The protection of Australia's sovereignty
- Citizenship and social cohesion

The department is headed by the Minister for Home Affairs.

=== United Kingdom ===
In the United Kingdom, the position of Secretary of State for the Home Department, normally referred to as the "Home Secretary", was created in the British governmental reorganisation of 1782.

The powers of the Home Secretary include control of law enforcement, citizenship and immigration policies.

=== United States ===
The United States Department of the Interior has responsibilities different from similarly named departments elsewhere, primarily the management and conservation of natural resources, and programs and policies dealing with Indigenous peoples. The functions that fall under what most other countries call an "interior ministry" come under other government departments—mostly the Department of Homeland Security (established in 2002 with functions such as immigration management, public safety and disaster relief), with some others falling under the Department of Justice (with functions such as handling the national police and the management of prisons) and individual state governments (e.g. election management).

=== Canada ===
In Canada, the post of Minister of the Interior existed from 1873 to 1936, replacing the previous role of the Secretary of State for the Provinces; it included functions similar to the US Department of the Interior. After 1936 the post was abolished, its responsibilities being transferred to other departments.

=== France ===
France has a Ministry of the Interior dealing with internal security, law enforcement, civil defence, crisis management, firefighting, identity (ID), territorial administration, elections, immigration and relations with the Catholic Church in France.

=== Hong Kong ===
In Hong Kong, the Secretary for Home Affairs is responsible for matters relating to communities, culture, sports and local governance. Policing and related matters are the responsibilities of the Secretary for Security.

=== India ===
The Ministry of Home Affairs in India (MHA) is responsible for internal security and demographics, promoting the official languages. It carries out specialized functions through its departments, namely the Department of Border Management, the Department of Internal Security, the Department of Jammu & Kashmir Affairs, the Department of Home, the Department of Official Language and the Department of States. As such it heads such functions as the internal intelligence, and police and Civil Services of India, also handling protocol, freedom-fighter pensions and manning of the courts.

In each state, there is a Home Department, also known as the Ministry of Home Affairs of the state, headed by a Minister for Home, who looks after the maintenance of law and order, internal security, and the administration of Police, Prisons, Fire and Rescue Services, Home Guards, Prosecution, and Civil and Criminal Justice.

=== Japan ===
In Japan, law enforcement is decentralised with the National Public Safety Commission coordinating between the National Police Agency and the government through its chairman, who is a cabinet member. National security and immigration matters fall under the Ministry of Justice, whilst the Ministry of Internal Affairs and Communications handles the administrative system, local government, elections, telecommunication and post matters.

=== New Zealand ===
The country has a Department of Internal Affairs (Te Tari Taiwhenua) whose stated areas of policy advice relate to community development, ethnic communities, fire protection, gambling, identity (ID), local government, online safety, racing and "general"

=== Poland ===
The Ministry of The Interior and Administration resembles other Polish Ministries in being divided into Departments (a somewhat confusing situation for English-speakers, in the light of the above). These notably deal with policy areas like public administration, security, citizenship and repatriation (the latter relating to the Polish diaspora), civil protection and crisis management, and public order.

=== Vietnam ===
In Vietnam, the Ministry of Public Security is responsible for policing, national security, and immigration matters.

== Lists ==
- List of current interior ministers
- List of female interior ministers

== See also ==
- Ministry of home affairs
- Justice ministry
