= Luís Neves =

Portuguese politician

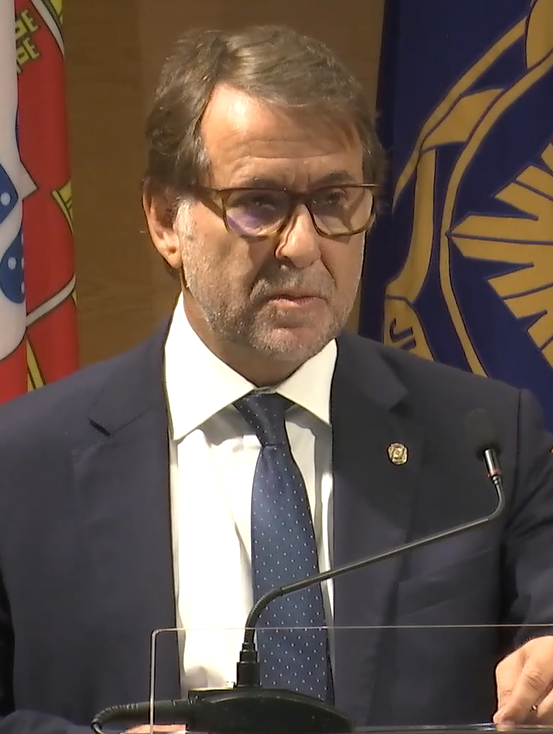
- Neves in 2022

Minister of Home Affairs
- Incumbent
- Assumed office 23 February 2026
- Prime Minister: Luís Montenegro
- Preceded by: Maria Lúcia Amaral

Personal details
- Born: Luís António Trindade Nunes das Neves; 24 September 1965 (age 61) Castelo Branco, Portugal
- Party: Independent
- Education: Lisbon Lusíada University
- Profession: Lawyer, Judicial Police inspector

Luís António Trindade Nunes das Neves (born 24 September 1965 in Castelo Branco) is a Portuguese criminal investigator and politician who is the current Minister of Home Affairs since February 2026, following the resignation of Maria Lucía Amaral. He previously served as the national Director of the Judiciary Police (PJ) from 2018 until 2026.

== Career ==
=== Judiciary police ===
Luís Neves graduated in law from Lusíada University, and after a brief stint as a lawyer, he joined the Judiciary Police in 1995. During his police career, Neves held various positions in the police, including inspector, coordinator, deputy director, and director of the unit responsible for combating terrorism, being involved in many investigations combating violent crime, organized crime and terrorism, such as arms trafficking, human trafficking and extremist organizations.

In 2018, he was nominated as director of the Judiciary Police, a position he held until 2026. During his term, he managed several investigations: the 2017 Tancos arms theft scandal, the capture of disgraced banker João Rendeiro, the dismantling of ETA separatist organization cells in Portugal, investigations into extremist groups with hate speech, as well as corruption.

=== Minister of home affairs ===
In the aftermath of Storm Kristin, in early February 2026, minister of home affairs Maria Lúcia Amaral resigned from the government, and a few weeks later, prime minister Luís Montenegro nominated Luís Neves as new minister on 21 February 2026. His appointment garnered both praise and some criticism, primarily due to the direct transition from the position of police director to that of minister.

==== Controversies ====
In July 2026, a series of reports started to question some of Neves' decisions and actions as Judiciary Police director. Initially, it was reported that Neves had hired, using his wife's company, a contractor he knew, who had also done several jobs for the police while Neves was director, to carry out work on one of his properties in Alentejo. Neves denied any wrongdoing, but it was later revealed that some of the construction works lacked municipal authorization, mainly a swimming pool. Furthermore, it was disclosed that Neves, also while he was still director of the Judiciary Police, lent a seized drug trailer to the same contractor who worked for the police and also in his private property. Questions were also raised regarding the invoices for the construction work on his property. Following these reports, both the Judiciary Police and the Public Prosecution Service opened inquiries into Neves' tenure. Luís Neves once again rejected any wrongdoing. Later it was also revealed that Neves failed to declare his assets, or those of his family, to the Constitutional Court while he was director of police, as he was required to do. These reports generated strong criticism of Neves in the media, as well as from the opposition, with parties like Chega calling for the minister's resignation, and subsequently presenting a motion of no confidence due to the controversies.

A new controversy emerged when Neves dismissed the general-secretary of the Home Affairs minister, Ricardo Carilho, in October 2026, with the latter accusing the minister of pressuring him into taking illegal decisions and actions regarding the management of SIRESP, the exclusive communications network of the Portuguese State for emergency and safety situations, while Neves' office accused Carrilho of constant conflict and of wanting to harm SIRESP.

Political offices
Preceded by Maria Lúcia Amaral	Minister of Home Affairs; 2026–present	Incumbent
