= Ministry of Home Affairs (Portugal) =

Government ministry of Portugal

- Ministério da Administração Interna
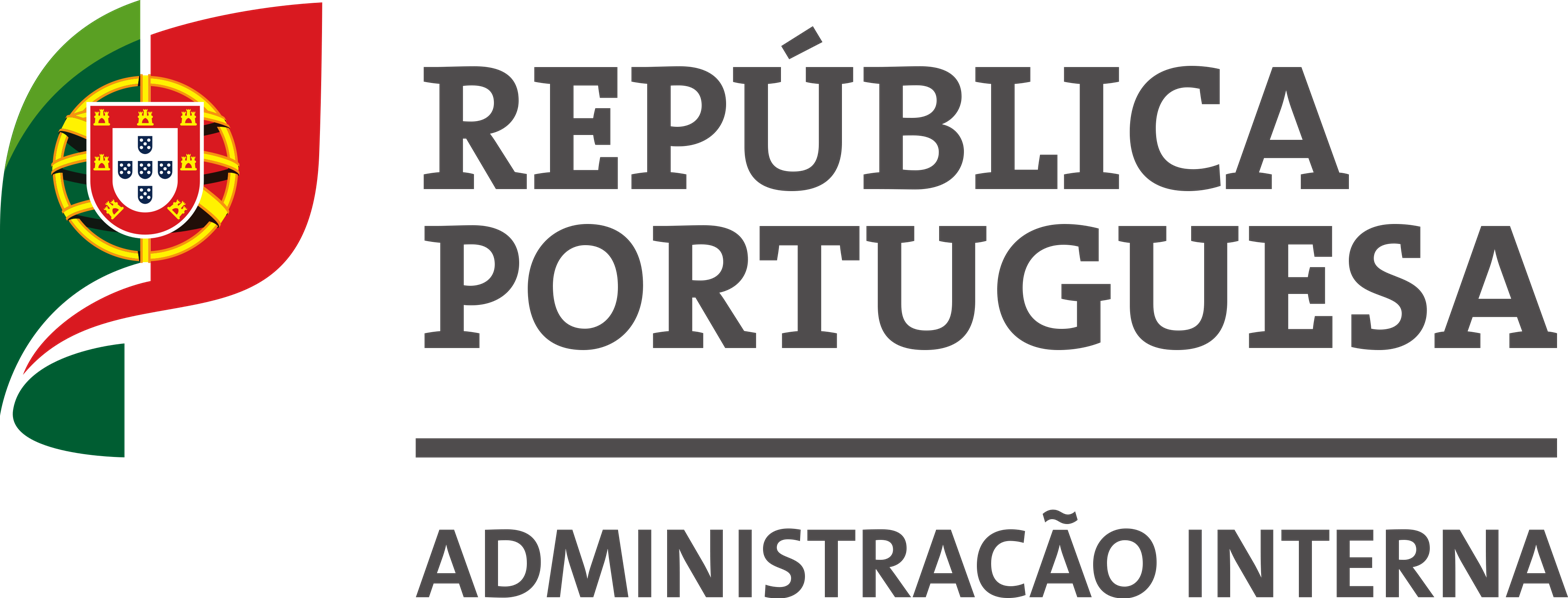
- Logo of the ministry

- Flag of the minister

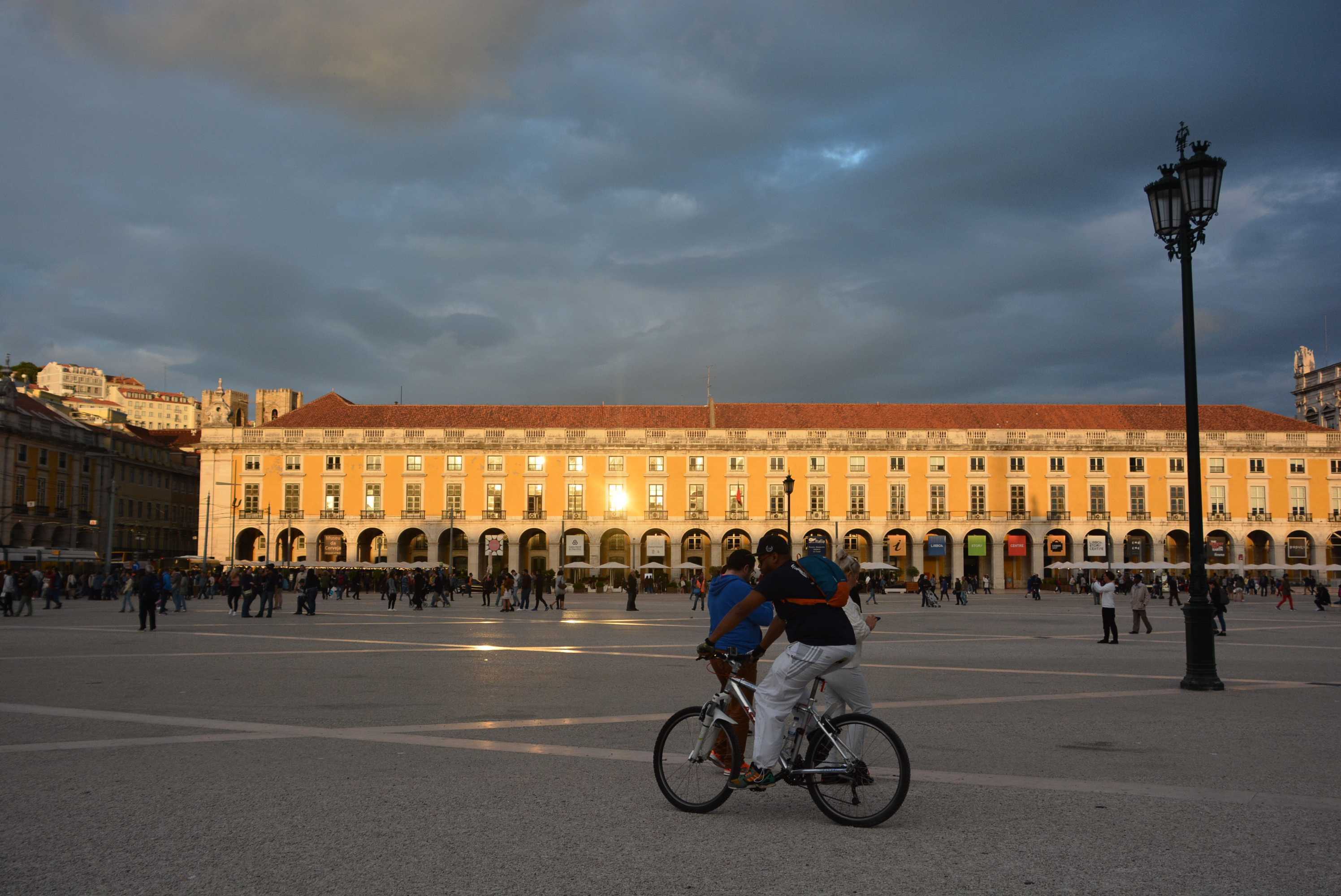
- Headquarters of the ministry in Lisbon

Ministry overview
- Formed: 28 June 1736 (290 years ago)
- Preceding agencies: Secretariat of State for the Interior Affairs of the Kingdom; Ministry of the Kingdom; Ministry of the Interior
- Type: Interior ministry
- Jurisdiction: Government of Portugal
- Headquarters: Praça do Comércio East Wing, Lisbon, Portugal; 38°42′29.556″N 9°8′6.8784″W
- Minister responsible: Luís Neves, Minister of Home Affairs
- Child agencies: National Authority for Emergency and Civil Protection; Polícia de Segurança Pública; National Republican Guard (during peacetime)
- Website: portugal.gov.pt

The Ministry of Home Affairs, (Note: Portuguese: Ministério da Administração Interna, MAI, lit. 'Ministry of Internal Administration') is the Portuguese government ministry responsible for public security, civil defense, electoral administration, road traffic safety, and immigration and refugee affairs.

The minister is Luís Neves, who had previously served as National Director of the Polícia Judiciária. He replaced Maria Lúcia Amaral, who resigned in February 2026 in the wake of Storm Kristin.

== History ==
The ministry was created in 1736 by King John V of Portugal as the Secretariat of State for the Interior Affairs of the Kingdom, (Note: Secretaria de Estado dos Negócios Interiores do Reino) later being known simply as the Ministry of the Kingdom. (Note: Ministério do Reino)

In 1910, after the establishment of the Portuguese First Republic, the ministry was renamed Ministry of the Interior. (Note: Ministério do Interior) In 1974, after the Carnation Revolution, it was again renamed, becoming the Ministry of Home Affairs.

== List of ministers (since 1974) ==
Colour key
(for political parties)
Social Democratic Party (PSD)
Socialist Party (PS)
Democratic and Social Center (CDS)
Independent (Ind.)

#	Portrait	Name	Took office	Left office	Party	Prime Minister
1		Joaquim Magalhães Mota (1935–2007)	16 May 1974	17 July 1974	PPD	Adelino da Palma Carlos
2		Manuel da Costa Braz (1934–2019)	17 July 1974	26 March 1975	Ind.	Vasco Gonçalves
3		António Arnão Metelo (1938–2008)	26 March 1975	8 August 1975	Ind.	Vasco Gonçalves
4		Alfredo Cândido de Moura (b. 1937)	8 August 1975	19 September 1975	Ind.	Vasco Gonçalves
5		Vasco de Almeida e Costa (1932–2010)	19 September 1975	23 July 1976	Ind.	José Pinheiro de Azevedo
6		Manuel da Costa Braz (1934–2019)	23 July 1976	30 January 1978	Ind.	Mário Soares
7		Alberto Oliveira e Silva (1924–2011)	30 January 1978	27 February 1978	PS	Mário Soares
8		Jaime Gama (b. 1947)	27 February 1978	29 August 1978	PS	Mário Soares
9		António Gonçalves Ribeiro (b. 1933)	29 August 1978	1 August 1979	Ind.	Alfredo Nobre da Costa
9		António Gonçalves Ribeiro (b. 1933)	29 August 1978	1 August 1979	Ind.	Carlos Mota Pinto
10		Manuel da Costa Braz (1934–2019)	1 August 1979	3 January 1980	Ind.	Maria Lourdes Pintasilgo
11		Eurico de Melo (1925–2012)	3 January 1980	9 January 1981	PSD	Francisco Sá Carneiro
11		Eurico de Melo (1925–2012)	3 January 1980	9 January 1981	PSD	Diogo Freitas do Amaral
12		Fernando Amaral (1925–2009)	9 January 1981	4 September 1981	PSD	Francisco Pinto Balsemão
13		Ângelo Correia (b. 1945)	4 September 1981	9 June 1983	PSD	Francisco Pinto Balsemão
14		Eduardo Pereira (1927–2015)	9 June 1983	6 November 1985	PS	Mário Soares
15		Eurico de Melo (1925–2012)	6 November 1985	17 August 1987	PSD	Aníbal Cavaco Silva
16		José Silveira Godinho (b. 1943)	17 August 1987	5 January 1990	PSD	Aníbal Cavaco Silva
17		Manuel Pereira (b. 1928)	5 January 1990	31 October 1991	PSD	Aníbal Cavaco Silva
18		Manuel Dias Loureiro (b. 1951)	31 October 1991	28 October 1995	PSD	Aníbal Cavaco Silva
19		Alberto Costa (b. 1947)	28 October 1995	25 November 1997	PS	António Guterres
20		Jorge Coelho (1954–2021)	25 November 1997	25 October 1999	PS	António Guterres
21		Fernando Gomes (b. 1946)	25 October 1999	14 September 2000	PS	António Guterres
22		Nuno Severiano Teixeira (b. 1957)	14 September 2000	6 April 2002	PS	António Guterres
23		António Figueiredo Lopes (b. 1936)	6 April 2002	17 June 2004	PSD	José Manuel Durão Barroso
24		Daniel Sanches (b. 1949)	17 June 2004	12 March 2005	PSD	Pedro Santana Lopes
25		António Costa (b. 1961)	12 March 2005	17 May 2007	PS	José Sócrates
26		Rui Pereira (b. 1956)	17 May 2007	21 June 2011	PS	José Sócrates
27		Miguel Macedo (1959–2025)	21 June 2011	19 November 2014	PSD	Pedro Passos Coelho
28		Anabela Rodrigues (b. 1953)	19 November 2014	30 October 2015	Ind.	Pedro Passos Coelho
29		João Calvão da Silva (1952–2018)	30 October 2015	26 November 2015	PSD	Pedro Passos Coelho
30		Constança Urbano de Sousa (b. 1967)	26 November 2015	18 October 2017	PS	António Costa
31		Eduardo Cabrita (b. 1961)	18 October 2017	4 December 2021	PS	António Costa
32		Francisca Van Dunem (b. 1955)	4 December 2021	30 March 2022	Ind.	António Costa
33		José Luís Carneiro (b. 1971)	30 March 2022	2 April 2024	PS	António Costa
34		Margarida Blasco (b. 1956)	2 April 2024	5 June 2025	Ind.	Luís Montenegro
35		Maria Lúcia Amaral (b. 1957)	5 June 2025	11 February 2026	Ind.	Luís Montenegro
36		Luís Montenegro (b. 1973)	11 February 2026	23 February 2026	PSD	Luís Montenegro
37		Luís Neves (b. 1965)	23 February 2026	Incumbent	Ind.	Luís Montenegro
