= Maria Lúcia Amaral =

Portuguese law professor and Ombudsman (born 1957)

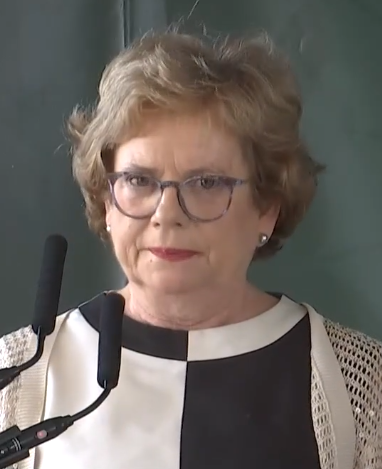
- Amaral in 2025

Minister of Home Affairs
- In office 5 June 2025 – 10 February 2026
- Prime Minister: Luís Montenegro
- Preceded by: Margarida Blasco
- Succeeded by: Luís Neves

Ombudsman of Portugal
- In office 2 November 2017 – 4 June 2025
- Preceded by: José de Faria Costa
- Succeeded by: Luísa Neto

Member of the Council of State
- In office 19 January 2018 – 4 June 2025
- Preceded by: José de Faria Costa
- Succeeded by: Luísa Neto

Vice President of the Constitutional Court
- In office 2 October 2012 – 22 July 2016
- Preceded by: Gil Gomes Galvão
- Succeeded by: João Caupers

Judge of the Constitutional Court
- In office 4 April 2007 – 22 July 2016
- Appointed by: Assembly of the Republic
- Preceded by: Paulo Mota Pinto
- Succeeded by: Cláudio Monteiro

Personal details
- Born: Maria Lúcia da Conceição Abrantes Amaral; 10 June 1957 (age 69) Nova Lisboa, Portuguese Angola, Portugal
- Citizenship: Portugal
- Party: Independent
- Education: University of Lisbon
- Occupation: Jurist; Professor; Judge

Maria Lúcia da Conceição Abrantes Amaral (born 10 June 1957) is a Portuguese lawyer, university professor and judge who served as the Portuguese Minister of Internal Administration of the 25th constitutional government, led by Luís Montenegro, until her resignation in February 2026.

She was also Vice President of the Constitutional Court of Portugal (2012–2016) and was Portugal's 10th Ombudsman (2017–2025), being the first woman to hold this post.

== Early life ==
Maria Lúcia da Conceição Abrantes Amaral was born on 10 June 1957 in the city of Nova Lisboa, now known as Huambo, in Angola, which was at the time a Portuguese colony. She graduated in law in 1980, from the Faculty of Law of the University of Lisbon, and obtained a master's in legal and political sciences in 1986 and a PhD in constitutional law in 1998 from the same faculty. While studying she was also working at Lisbon University and at the Catholic University of Portugal.

== Career ==
After receiving a doctorate, Amaral pursued an academic career as a professor at the NOVA University Lisbon from 1998, becoming a full professor in 2008. She taught and also published a wide range of publications.

=== Judge of the Constitutional Court, 2007–2017 ===
In March 2007, Amaral was elected as a judge of the Constitutional Court by the Assembly of the Republic and served on the court for nine years. She was elected vice president by her fellow judges in October 2012. The court was involved in several notable constitutional issues, particularly relating to some of the austerity measures of the then government of Pedro Passos Coelho. Her attitude to the constitutionality of austerity, in which her broad view was that this was not a constitutional issue, often put her at odds with the other members of the court.

=== Ombudsman, 2017–2025 ===
In November 2017, Amaral took office as Portugal's Ombudsman. She was nominated by the Social Democratic Party (PSD) with the support of the governing Portuguese Socialist Party (PS). She received the necessary two-thirds majority of the House of Assembly, with only seven votes against. In her inaugural speech she promised "independence from power", "constant vigilance" and "firm obedience to the fundamental rights of the people".

In March 2024, Amaral stated she planned to ask the Constitutional Court to declare legislation that decriminalised euthanasia to be unconstitutional.

=== Home Affairs Minister, 2025–2026 ===
Amaral became home affairs minister in the government of Luis Montenegro. She resigned from her position on 10 February 2026 amid criticism over the government's response to Storm Kristin and the 2025–26 European windstorm season as a whole.

== Publications ==
Amaral is editor of the law journal, Themis, which is published by the NOVA University. Among her many contributions to this and other journals are:

- Questões Regionais e Jurisprudência Constitucional. In Estudos em Memória ao Professor Doutor João de Castro Mendes, LEX, Lisboa, 1996, pp. 511–532
- Carl Schmitt e Portugal. O problema dos métodos em direito constitucional português. In Perspectivas Constitucionais, ed. Jorge Miranda, Coimbra Editora, Coimbra, 1996, pp. 167–194
- Responsabilidade civil extracontratual do Estado: a propósito do prazo de prescrição do direito à indemnização. Cadernos de Justiça Administrativa, n° 12, pp. 31–38
- A Revisão Constitucional de 1997, sistema de actos legislativos – Opinião. Legislação, Cadernos de Ciência de Legislação, 19/20, Abril-Dezembro de 1997, pp. 105–121
- Dever de Legislar e Dever de Indemnizar. Themis, Ano I, n° 2–2000, pp. 67–98
- Separação horizontal e separação vertical de poderes: funções do Estado e autonomia local. Cadernos de Justiça Administrativa, nº 24, 2000, pp. 18–30
- O Estado de Direito Democrático Português. Estudos de Direito Constitucional, coordenador Rogério Nunes dos Anjos Filho, Jus Podivm, Salvador, Bahia, Brasil, pp. 393–416
- Um Povo de Homens e de Mulheres em país de Constituição débil. Ex aequo, Revista da Associação Portuguesa de Estudos sobre as Mulheres, nº 10 (Direito da Igualdade de Género, edited by Maria do Céu Cunha Rego), pp. 17–27
- O Princípio da Igualdade na Constituição da República Portuguesa. In Estudos em Homenagem ao Professor Doutor Armando Marques Guedes, Coimbra Editora, pp. 35–57
- Problemas da judicial review em Portugal. In Themis, Ano VI, n° 10, pp. 67–90
- Justiça Constitucional e Trinta Anos de Constituição. In Themis, 30 Anos da Constituição Portuguesa, 2006, pp. 145–153
- Queixas constitucionais e recursos de constitucionalidade. In Estudos Commemorativos dos 10 Anos da Faculdade de Direito da Universidade Nova de Lisboa, Almedina, Lisboa, 2008, pp. 473–499
- O Princípio da Dignidade da Pessoa Humana na Jurisprudência Constitucional Portuguesa. In Liber Amicorum, José de Sousa e Brito; Estudos de Direito e Filosofia, Almedina, Coimbra, 2009, pp. 945–964
- Constituição - Os Limites da Política; 1822-1976. Fundação Francisco Manuel dos Santos, Lisboa, 2024

Legal offices
Preceded by Paulo Mota Pinto	Judge of the Constitutional Court; 2007–2016	Succeeded by Cláudio Monteiro
Political offices
Preceded by Margarida Blasco	Minister of Home Affairs; 2025–2026	Succeeded by Luís Neves
