= Alicia Arango =

Colombian politician and businesswoman (born 1958)

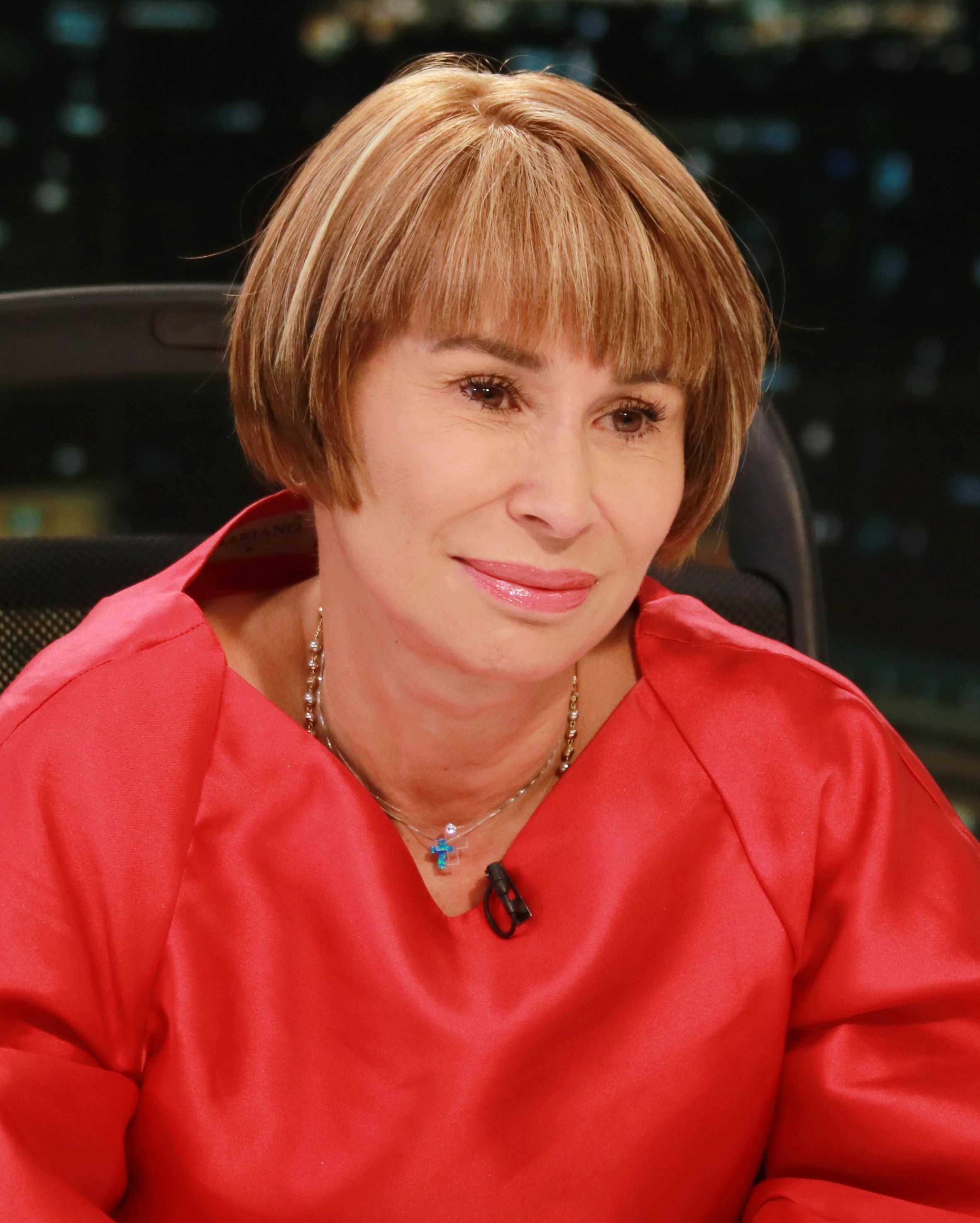

Minister of Interior
- In office 13 February 2020 – 22 December 2020
- President: Iván Duque
- Preceded by: Nancy Patricia Gutierrez
- Succeeded by: Daniel Palacios

Minister of Labour
- In office 7 August 2018 – 13 February 2020
- President: Iván Duque
- Preceded by: Griselda Restrepo
- Succeeded by: Ángel Custodio Cabrera

Personal details
- Born: Alicia Victoria Arango Olmos; 1 October 1958 (age 67) Cartagena, Bolivar, Colombia

Alicia Victoria Arango Olmos (born 1 October 1958) is a Colombian politician and businesswoman, who served as the Minister of Interior and the Minister of Labor of Colombia. She was previously the private secretary of President Álvaro Uribe's Casa de Nariño and the nation's ambassador to the United Nations at Geneva.

== Biography ==
Alicia Arango studied business administration at the College of Advanced Management Studies at Bogotá and specialized in public administration at the University of the Andes. She was the Chief of Staff and then assistant chief of staff of Coldeportes, and was later appointed deputy director of the Colombian Institute of Administration. Arango was an adviser to Adelina Covo when she was the Colombian Minister of Education in 1995 and in 1997 to 1998, Arango was a delegate for Cesar and Cundinamarca Departments (respectively) before the Colombian Institute of Family Welfare, also while Covo was head of that entity.

During the first term of Enrique Peñalosa as mayor of Bogotá, Arango was the director of the city's District Institute of Recreation and Sports.

Arango was appointed to replace Angelino Garzón as Colombia's ambassador to the United Nations, taking her office 9 June 2010.

In July 2015, Arango was appointed director of the Democratic Center Party, founded in 2013 by Álvaro Uribe.

Political offices
Preceded by Griselda Restrepo	Minister of Labor of Colombia; 2018–2020	Succeeded by Ángel Custodio Cabrera
Preceded by Nancy Patricia Gutierrez	Minister of Interior of Colombia; 2020–present	Incumbent
