= João Calvão da Silva =

Portuguese politician

Minister of Internal Administration
- In office 30 October 2015 – 26 November 2015
- President: Aníbal Cavaco Silva
- Prime Minister: Pedro Passos Coelho
- Preceded by: Anabela Miranda Rodrigues
- Succeeded by: Constança Urbano de Sousa

Member of Parliament
- In office 1995–1999
- Constituency: Coimbra

Personal details
- Born: João Calvão da Silva; 20 February 1952 Solveira, Montalegre
- Died: 20 March 2018 (aged 66) Coimbra
- Party: Social Democratic Party
- Education: University of Coimbra

João Calvão da Silva (20 February 1952 – 20 March 2018) was a Portuguese politician.

Calvão de Silva attended the University of Coimbra, graduating in 1975. He began teaching at his alma mater in 2003. Elected to the Assembly of the Republic from 1995 to 1999, he later served as Minister of Internal Administration in 2015.

Father of João Nuno Cruz Matos Calvão da Silva.
