= Miguel Macedo =

Portuguese lawyer and politician (1959–2025)

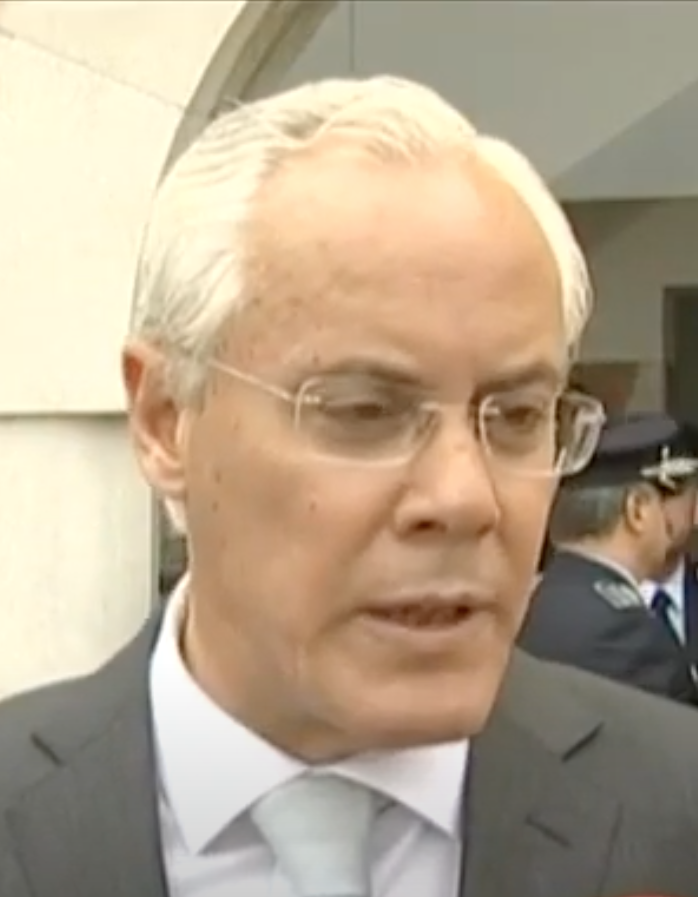
- Macedo in 2014

Minister of Internal Administration
- In office 21 June 2011 – 16 November 2014
- Prime Minister: Pedro Passos Coelho
- Preceded by: Rui Pereira
- Succeeded by: Anabela Rodrigues

Member of the Assembly of the Republic
- In office 10 March 2005 – 15 November 2015
- Constituency: Braga
- In office 13 August 1987 – 4 April 2002
- Constituency: Braga

Personal details
- Born: Miguel Bento Martins da Costa Macedo e Silva; 6 June 1959 Braga, Portugal
- Died: 13 March 2025 (aged 65)
- Party: Social Democratic Party
- Profession: Lawyer

Miguel Bento Martins da Costa Macedo e Silva (6 June 1959 – 13 March 2025) was a Portuguese lawyer and politician who served as Minister of Internal Administration.

Macedo received his degree in law from the University of Coimbra.

== Life and career ==
Miguel Macedo was the leader of JSD, the youth wing of PSD. His first experience in the government was in the first cabinet of Aníbal Cavaco Silva as Junior Secretary of State of Minister Couto dos Santos between 1990 and 1991. Afterwards he became active in local politics and was elected city councilor of Braga, from 1993 to 1997. In 2002, he returned to national politics with the PSD as State Secretary of Justice under Minister Celeste Cardona and Minister José Pedro Aguiar-Branco. He was the Deputy for Braga from 1987 to 2002, and again from 2005 onwards.

When Pedro Passos Coelho was elected president of PSD, Miguel Macedo was elected leader of Parliament. His negative vote for the approval of the Programa de Estabilidade e Crescimento [Stability and Growth Programme] (PEC) of the current president at that time, José Sócrates, meant the fall of his government and the call for early elections.

On 16 November 2014, he announced his resignation following a series of corruption allegations and investigations into some of his business and ministerial partners, regarding the attribution of golden visas. In February 2017, the trial regarding those accusations began. In January 2019, Miguel Macedo was acquitted from all the accusations.

Macedo died from a heart attack on 13 March 2025, at the age of 65.
