= Arsénia Massingue =

Mozambican politician

Her Excellency Arsénia Massingue
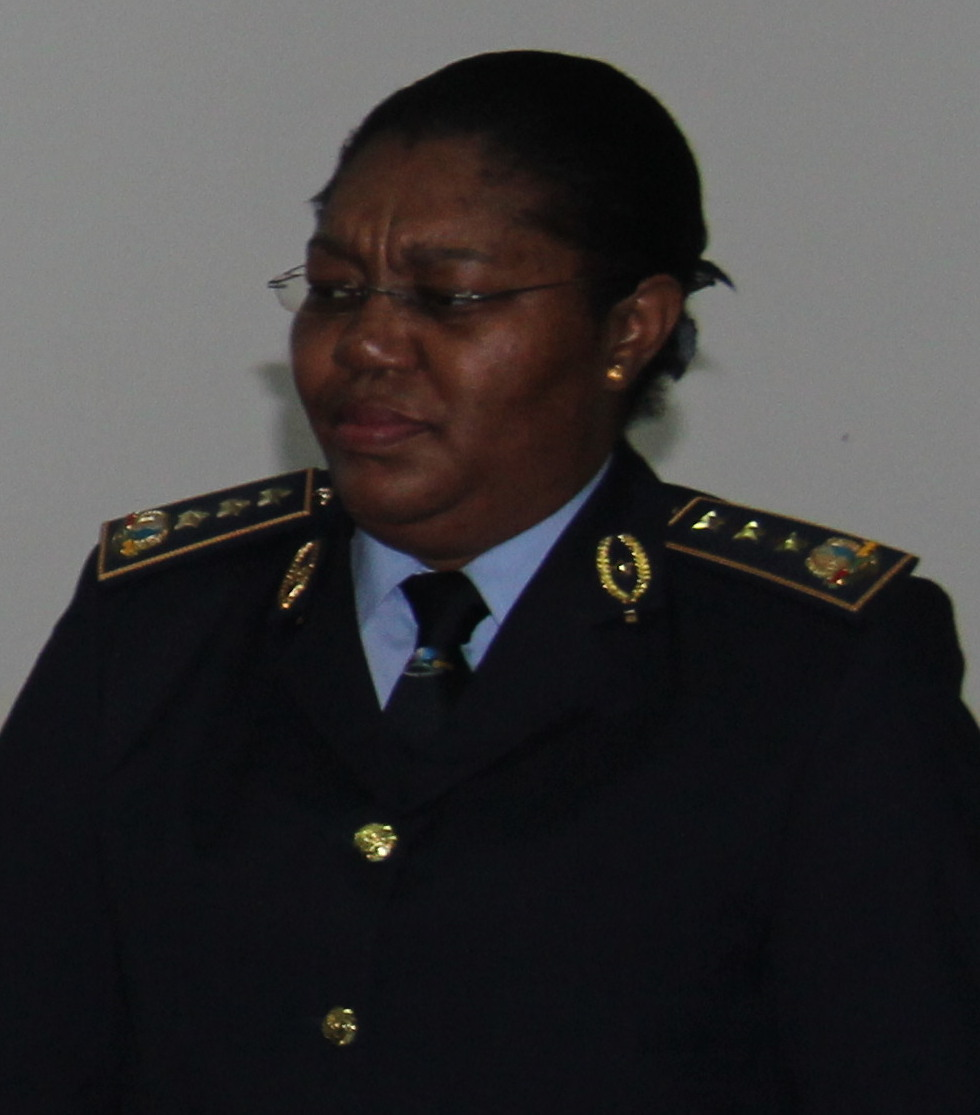
- Massingue in 2017

Minister of the Interior of Mozambique
- In office 11 November 2021 – 28 August 2023
- President: Filipe Nyusi
- Prime Minister: Adriano Afonso Maleiane; Carlos Agostinho do Rosário
- Preceded by: Amade Miquidade
- Succeeded by: Pascoal Pedro João Ronda

Personal details
- Born: 1954
- Party: FRELIMO
- Occupation: Cabinet minister
- Profession: Politician

Arsénia Felicidade Félix Massingue is a Mozambican politician who served as the Minister of the Interior from November 2021 until August 2023. She is the first woman to serve as Interior Minister in Mozambican history.

== Background ==
Massingue had served as the provincial police commander in the Inhambane, Manica and Nampula provinces. Before her appointment as a cabinet minister, Massingue had served as the Director of the National Immigration Service (SENAMI).

On 11 November 2021, Massingue was appointed as the Minister of the Interior by president Filipe Nyusi, replacing Amade Miquidade, who was dismissed by Nyusi without an explanation. She was the first woman to serve as Interior Minister in Mozambican history.

On 28 August 2023, Nyusi sacked her as Interior minister and replaced her with Pascoal Pedro João Ronda.

Political offices
Preceded by Amade Miquidade	Mozambican Minister of the Interior; 2021–2023	Succeeded by Pascoal Pedro João Ronda
