= Anabela Miranda Rodrigues =

Portuguese politician (born 1953)

Anabela Rodrigues

Minister of Internal Administration
- In office 19 November 2014 – 30 October 2015
- Prime Minister: Pedro Passos Coelho
- Preceded by: Miguel Macedo
- Succeeded by: João Calvão da Silva

Personal details
- Born: 5 December 1953 (age 72) Coimbra, Portugal

Anabela Miranda Rodrigues (born 5 December 1953) is a Portuguese politician who was the first female Minister of Internal Administration, having served from 19 November 2014 to 30 October 2015 under Prime Minister Pedro Passos Coelho.
