= Constança Urbano de Sousa =

Portuguese academic and politician

Her Excellency Constança Urbano de Sousa
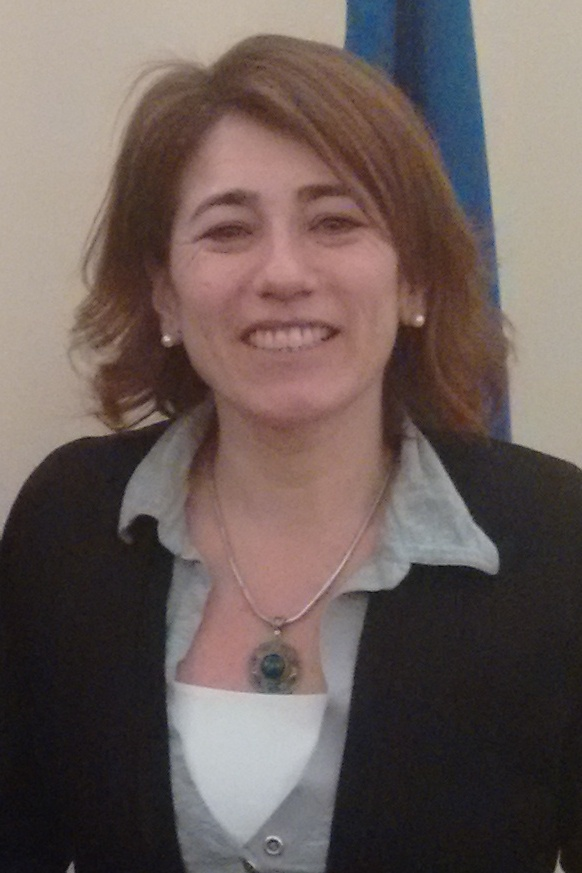

Minister of Internal Administration
- In office 26 November 2015 – 18 October 2017
- Prime Minister: António Costa
- Preceded by: João Calvão da Silva
- Succeeded by: Eduardo Cabrita

Personal details
- Born: April 1, 1967 (age 59) Coimbra, Portugal
- Education: University of Coimbra
- Website: Minister of Internal Administration

Maria Constança Dias Urbano de Sousa (born 1 April 1967) is a Portuguese jurist and the country's former Minister of Internal Administration.

== Education ==
Constança Urbano de Sousa graduated in Law from the Faculty of Law of the University of Coimbra, in 1991, and received a postgraduate degree in European Law and a doctorate in Law from Saarland University, in Germany, in 1994 and 1997, respectively.

== Professional career ==
She is a former Portuguese Minister of Internal Administration, in António Costa's cabinet. During her tenure, Portugal experienced the deadliest wildfires ever, firstly in Pedrogão Grande in June 2017 (65 dead) and later across the country in October 2017 (41 dead). In the sequence of the wildfires in Portugal in June and October, Constança Urbano de Sousa resigned on 18 October 2017.

From 2006 to 2012, she coordinated the Justice and Internal Affairs group of Portugal's Permanent Representation to the European Union. For six years, she headed the national delegation to the Strategic Committee on Immigration, Frontiers and Asylum of the European Union, which she chaired in 2007, and was part of other committees of Council of the European Union.

== Personal life ==
She was born in the civil parish (freguesia) of Sé Nova, in Coimbra, the daughter of former Ombudsman Alfredo José de Sousa and Maria Clara Pires Dias Urbano de Sousa.

She lives in Cascais, a cosmopolitan suburb of the Portuguese capital.
