= Nancy Patricia Gutiérrez =

Colombian lawyer and politician

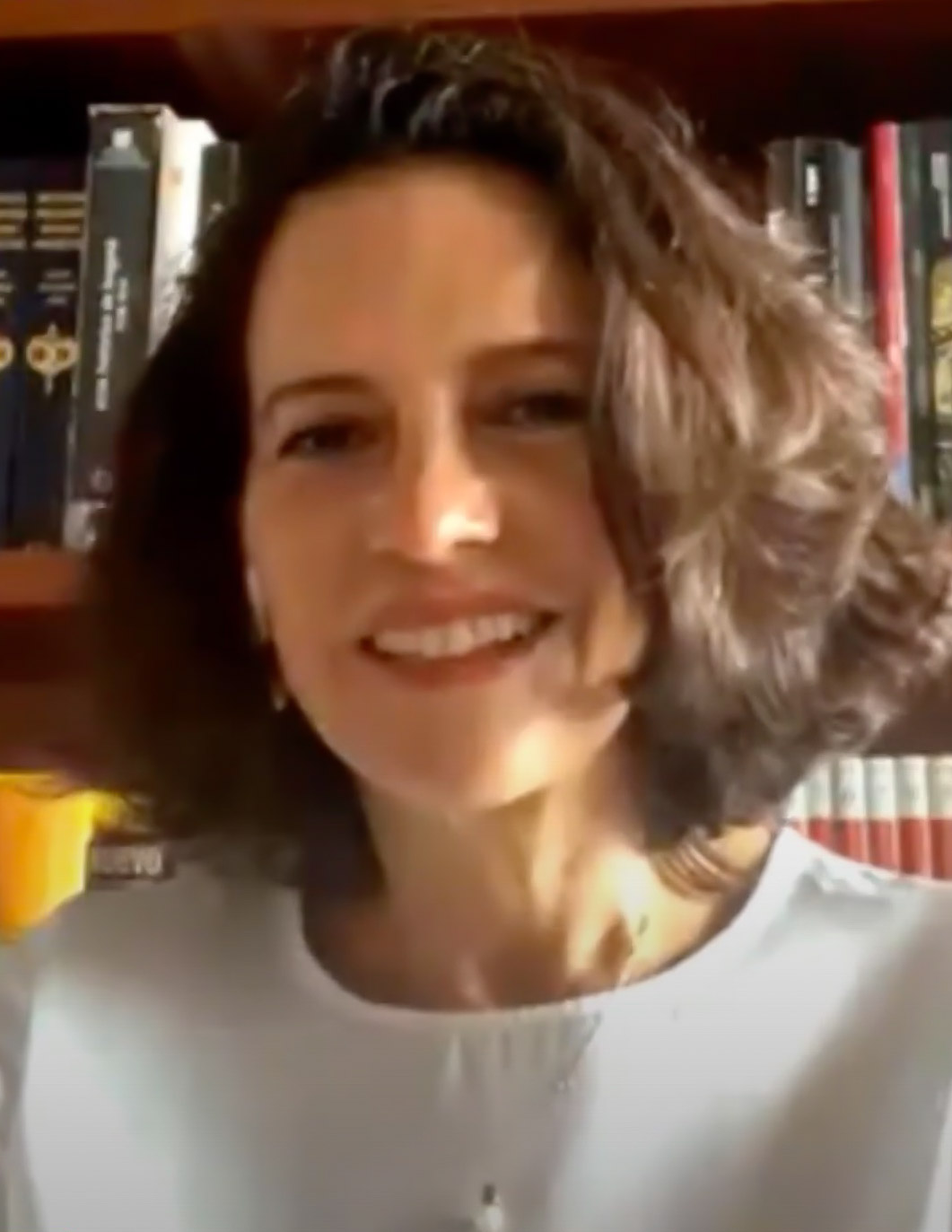
- Gutiérrez in 2020

Minister of the Interior
- In office 7 August 2018 – 13 February 2020
- President: Iván Duque
- Preceded by: Guillermo Rivera
- Succeeded by: Alicia Arango

Senator of Colombia
- In office 20 July 2006 – 20 July 2010

President of the Senate
- In office 20 July 2007 – 20 July 2008
- Preceded by: Dilian Francisca Toro
- Succeeded by: Hernán Andrade Serrano

Member of the Chamber of Representavies
- In office 20 July 1998 – 20 July 2006
- Constituency: Cundinamarca

President of the Chamber of Representatives
- In office 30 March 2000 – 20 July 2000
- Preceded by: Armando Pomárico Ramos
- Succeeded by: Basilio Villamizar Trujillo

Personal details
- Born: Nancy Patricia Gutiérrez Castañeda; 16 October 1963 (age 62) Girardot, Cundinamarca, Colombia
- Party: Colombia Always
- Other political affiliations: Radical Change (2004-present); Liberal (1988–2004)
- Education: Our Lady of the Rosary University
- Profession: Lawyer
- Website: www.nancypatricia.com

Nancy Patricia Gutiérrez Castañeda (born 16 October 1963) is a Colombian lawyer and politician. She served as Senator of Colombia and Member of the Chamber of Representatives of Colombia, having served in both chambers as president.

== Career ==
Gutiérrez Castañeda, a lawyer from the Our Lady of the Rosary University, was first elected in 1988 as mayor of the Municipality of Agua de Dios, Cundinamarca, representing the political movement Colombia Always, a movement created within the Liberal Party. After finalizing her term in 1990 Gutiérrez Castañeda was appointed Regional Director of the Colombian Institute of Family Welfare (ICBF) in 1991. She later returned to the political arena when she supported Leonor Serrano for the Governorship of Cundinamarca in 1994. When Serrano was elected she appointed Gutiérrez Castañeda as Secretary of Environment in January 1995, and a year later as secretary general.

== Representative ==
In 1997, she resigned from Serrano's administration to postulate herself for the Chamber of Representatives of Colombia for the legislative elections of 1998.

After a long deliberation process following the corruption scandal that resulted in the resignation of the President of the Chamber of Representatives, Armando Pomárico, Gutiérrez Castañeda was elected by the liberal majority coalition to finish Pomárico's term as President of the Chamber of the Representatives of Colombia, and became on March 30, 2000 the first woman to ever serve as President of the Chamber in the history of Colombia. Although her short presidency ended on July 20, 2000, she terminated the programs her predecessor was accused of, like foreign trips, gasoline allowances for the transportation of congress members, and the payroll discrepancies that so infuriated the public. In 2002 Gutiérrez Castañeda was re-elected representing the Colombia Always movement supporting once again Leonor Serrano who ran for a seat in the Senate. In 2004 Colombia Always left the Liberal coalition and joined the ranks of the Radical Change.

As a Representative, she was a member of the First Constitutional Commission, the Special Commission on Territorial Division, the Commission on Peace, and the Special Commission on Modernization.

== Senator ==
For the legislative elections of 2006 Gutiérrez Castañeda was elected as Senator of Colombia in representation of Radical Change. Radical Change had made a pact with the coalition of supporters of President Álvaro Uribe, giving the party the chance to preside the Senate. After an election in Congress against senators Rubén Darío Quintero, Arturo Char, and Miguel Pinedo, Gutiérrez Castañeda was elected President of the Senate of Colombia for the period that began on July 20, 2007.

=== Controversies ===
On April 18, 2008, the Supreme Court of Colombia ordered a preliminary investigation against Senator Gutiérrez while she was President of Congress for her apparent relation to armed right rebel groups in the Colombian parapolitics scandal that shook the country, and led to the incarceration of various congressmen. The investigations connected Gutierrez with alias "El Pájaro", paramilitary of Cundinamarca, from where she is from Gutiérrez has denied the allegations and any relation with the rebels, citing her investigation as a plot against her. On 17 October 2011 the Office of the Inspector General of Colombia officially dropped the case against Congresswoman Gutiérrez.

Political offices
Preceded by Armando Pomárico	President of the Chamber of Representatives; 1999–2000	Succeeded by Basilio Villamizar
Preceded by Dilian Francisca Toro	President of the Senate; 2007–2008	Succeeded by Hernán Andrade
Preceded by Guillermo Rivera Flórez	Minister of the Interior; 2018–2020	Succeeded by Alicia Arango
