= Bubnjarci =

Village in Karlovac County, Croatia

- Interactive map of Bubnjarci
- Coordinates: 45°38′39″N 15°21′32″E
- Country: Croatia
- County: Karlovačka županija

Area
  - Total: 1.9 km^{2} (0.73 sq mi)

Population (2021)
  - Total: 197
  - Density: 100/km^{2} (270/sq mi)
- Area code: 047
- License plate: KA

Bubnjarci (until 1918 St. Kosma and Damian) is a village in Croatia on the Slovenian border. The name Bubnjarci (Croatian: Bubnjar = drummer) comes from the time when the inhabitants in the 15–16th centuries, the Knights of Ozalj and Ribnik against the Turks served as a signal drummer. The name Bubnjarački Brod was a part of Bubnjarci and ranged from Bukovac to Žakanje in the 16th century. Bubnjarci was first mentioned in the 15th century, with a manor house same name. In that time it was one of the most important castles in Croatia. The exact position was the plot number 93, clearly visible on the cadastral map of 1860. About the time of the establishment are no sources.

== Geography ==
Bubnjarci is in the immediate vicinity of the river Kupa (Kulpa) near Metlika, which is also the border river of Slovenia. Already in the 12th century, the Kupa already was border between Kranjska (Krain) and Croatia

== History ==
Bubnjarci belonged since the 14th Century to the municipality Lipnik, now Ribnik. This included 25 villages in the year 1418 with 4784 souls. This is engraved in the bell of Ribnik. Because of the way to Ribnik was much too far, however, they visited the Holy Mass in Metlika in the Carniola.

== Railway history ==
Averages, the part of the Kupa by the rail link, which - in the course of road construction for Karlovac - from Ljubljana (Ljubljana) - Novo Mesto (Rudolfwert) in 1913 and beyond Karlovac (Carlstadt) has been expanded 1914th Originally, this connection from the junction Bubnjarci (12 Verschiebegleise) to be built for Dubrovnik further, however, stopped the decline of the Austrian Empire in 1918 these plans. Today, run the two-axle Railcar s of ancient DB series 795 between Metlika (Möttling) and Karlovac.

== Owners ==
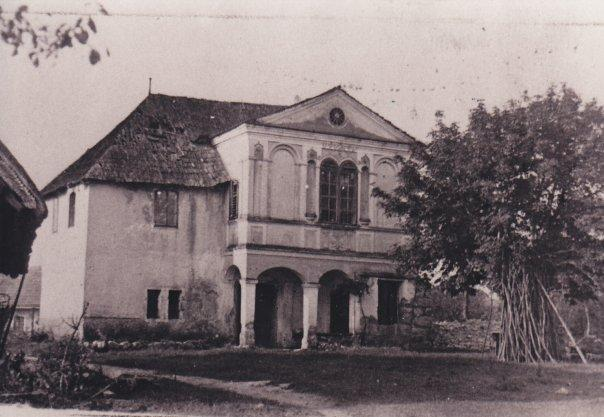
Bubnjarci Mansion

Franjo Herendic, a wealthy nobleman, possessed in the 16th Bubnjarci century the estate, whose property abutted on to Žakanje. Hence the name Bubnjarački brod. Petar Lukic, born in Trg, a nobleman who had the adjoining property to Ribnik spread in this time the Lutheran faith. Herendic Lukic was such a good friend that he 1579, when he determined his will, Lukic would have attended as a witness ("i Petar Lukic predykator").

Last it was in the possession of the Aleksandar Filip Šufflaj (12 February 1796, Samobor, † 22 November 1882], Brlog), as a landowner in 1838 bought the castle Brlog.

The previous owner of the Bubnjarci Mansion was Josef Matthias Haus (* 2 September 1807, † 1859). He was the father of the only Austrian Grand Admiral, baron Anton von Haus.

== Attractions ==
Well worth a 1753 completed, highly visible Baroque e Chapel Sveti Kriz is with its old cemetery. In the chapel are two lateral altars are historically featured in the 1830. Currently, this is completely renovated by the inhabitants with a new copper roof and new facade. The chapel was first mentioned in 1688, but was built without a bell tower with the entrance. Even before the founding of the parish Zupe Žakanje Bubnjarci belonged to a parish Lipnik. On display today is still the old water of kukEisenbahn that was fired to the many steam locomotive s with hot water to fill. In several places one can still imagine the twelve shunting and turning tracks, which were along the direction of the Kupa river crossing bridge laid. The old and now derelict railway building still suggests to the then busy time around 1900 back in Bubnjarci.

== Literature ==
- "Bubnjarci na Kupi" by Mirko Vitez

== Other events ==
The school was opened in Bubnjarci 1922nd A few years later, in 1925, the volunteer fire department (DVD) founded Bubnjarci. In 2000 they founded the sports club (SD) Bubnjarci; 2009 the "Cultural Bubnjarci.

== Company ==
- ARM d.o.o., Bubnjarci 38
- Gataric, Bubnjarci 1h
- GBB d.o.o, Bubnjarci 1j
- Impeks d.o.o, Bubnjarci 75

== Surrounding villages up to 6 km ==
'Location'country'coordinates'distance and direction

- Božakovo SL 45 ° 39 'N 15 ° 22' E 0.8 km - N - from Bubnjarci -
- Rosalnice SL 45 ° 40 N 15 ° 21 'E 2 km - NW -
- Drasici SL 45 ° 40 'N 15 ° 22' E 2.5 km - N -
- Restovo HR 45 ° 38 'N 15 ° 23' E 2.6 km - SO -
- Jurovski Brod HR 45 ° 38 'N 15 ° 20' E 3.3 km - SW -
- Veliki Vrh HR 45 ° 38 'N 15 ° 24' E 3.5 km - SO -
- Vrh Mali HR 45 ° 38 `N 15 ° 24 'E 3.5 km - SO -
- Kamanje HR 45 ° 38 'N 15 ° 24' E 3.6 km - SO -
- Metlika SL 45 ° 39 'N 15 ° 19' E 4 km - W -
- Radovica SL 45 ° 41 'N 15 ° 21' E 4.2 km - NNW -
- Boldraz SL 45 ° 41 'N 15 ° 21' E 4.3 km - NNW -
- Stojavnica HR 45 ° 41 'N 15 ° 23' E 4.4 km - NNE -
- Gornji Lović HR 45 ° 40 'N 15 ° 25' E 4.5 km - ENO -
- Krizevska Vas SL 45 ° 38 'N 15 ° 19' E 4.5 km - WSW -
- Vivodina HR 45 ° 41 'N 15 ° 24' E 4.6 km - NO -
- Lijesce HR 45 ° 41 'N 15 ° 19' E 5.2 km - NW -
- Police-Pirisce HR 45 ° 38 'N 15 ° 26' E 5.2 km - OSO -
- Bratovanci HR 45 ° 38 'N 15 ° 26' E 5.2 km - OSO -
- Primostek HR 45 ° 38 'N 15 ° 18' E 5.3 km - WSW -
- Kast HR 45 ° 42 'N 15 ° 22' E 5.6 km - N -
- Breznik HR 45 ° 36 'N 15 ° 22' E 5.6 km - S -
- Žakanje HR 45 ° 36 'N 15 ° 21' E 5.7 km - SSW -
- Bojanja Vas SL 45 ° 42 'N 15 ° 20' E 6 km - NNW -
