= Cerkvišče =

- Location in Slovenia
- Coordinates: 45°34′33.48″N 15°15′51.54″E
- Country: Slovenia
- Traditional region: White Carniola
- Statistical region: Southeast Slovenia
- Municipality: Črnomelj

Area
  - Total: 5.77 km^{2} (2.23 sq mi)
- Elevation: 159.5 m (523 ft)

Population (2020)
  - Total: 67
  - Density: 12/km^{2} (30/sq mi)
- Postal code: 8332

Cerkvišče (pronounced [tsɛɾˈkʋiːʃtʃɛ]) is a settlement in the Municipality of Črnomelj in the White Carniola area of southeastern Slovenia. It lies in the area between the right bank of the Lahinja River and the left bank of the Kolpa. It is part of the traditional region of Lower Carniola and is now included in the Southeast Slovenia Statistical Region.

== Geography ==
Cerkvišče is a clustered village on a low rise surrounded by a plain. Fertile fields lie around the village, mostly in the direction of Krasinec (to the northeast) and southwest of Griblje (to the east). There are some vineyards in sunny locations above the village. Forested areas include the Big Woods (Slovene: Velika loza) in the direction of Prilozje and the Rovišče Woods toward Pavičiči. Cave Spring (Slovene: V jami or Zdenc v jami) lies on the western edge of the village, and to the southwest is Bezgovka Cave with a langth of 92 meters (302 ft) and depth of 1 meter (3 ft 3 in). Deer Cave (Slovene: Jelenja jama or Jelenova jama), northwest of the village in the territory of neighboring Pavičiči, has two shafts and a constant flow of spring water, which the villagers of Cerkvišče used to water their livestock.
