= Boršt, Metlika =

Boršt
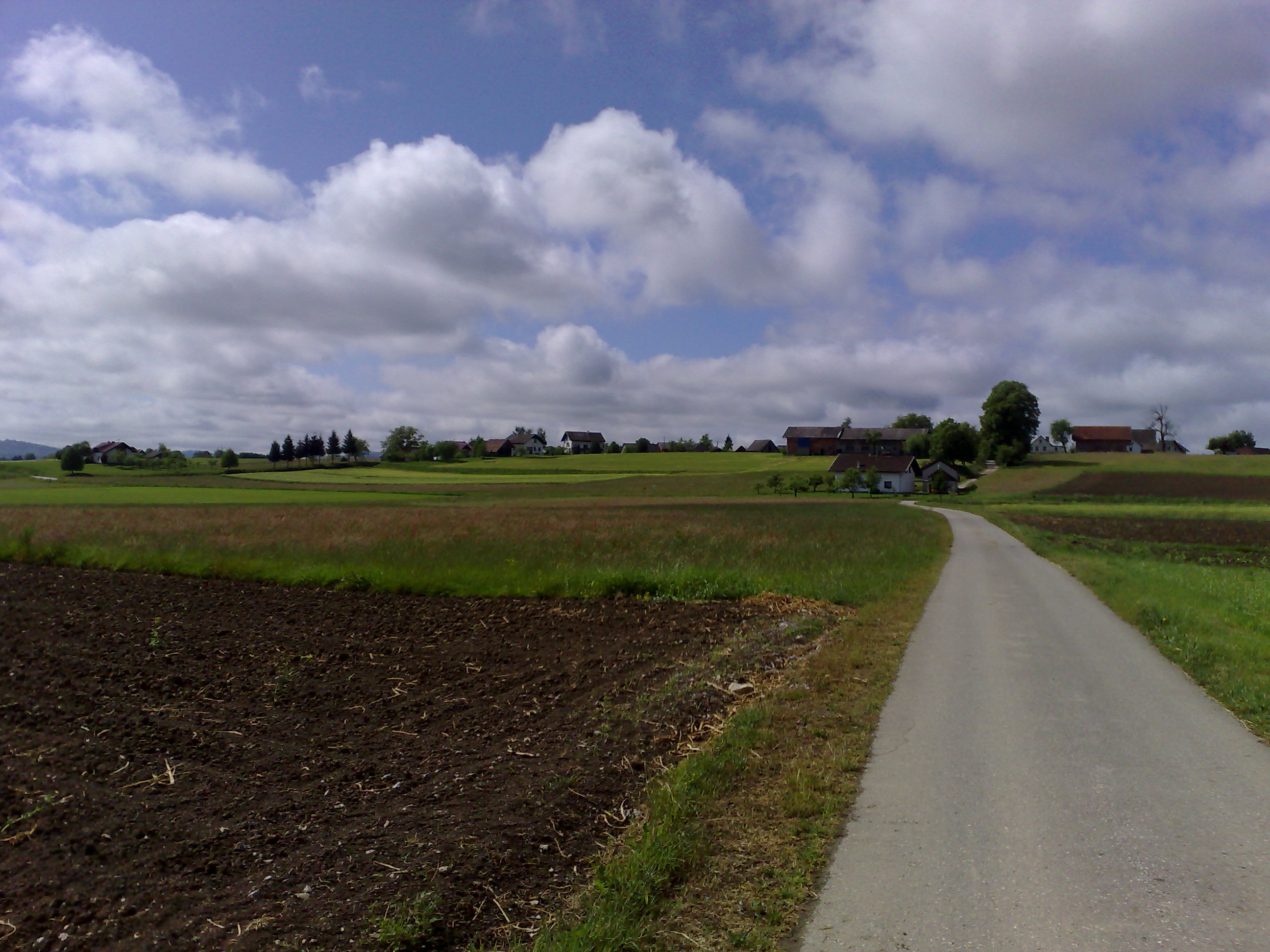
- View of Boršt from the village of Škrilje

- Location in Slovenia
- Coordinates: 45°35′54.09″N 15°16′14.07″E
- Country: Slovenia
- Traditional region: White Carniola
- Statistical region: Southeast Slovenia
- Municipality: Metlika

Area
  - Total: 0.4 km^{2} (0.15 sq mi)
- Elevation: 151.3 m (496 ft)

Population (2002)
  - Total: 56
- Postal code: 8332

Boršt (pronounced [ˈbɔɾʃt]) is a small settlement on the left bank of the Kolpa River in the Municipality of Metlika in the White Carniola area of southeastern Slovenia. The entire area is part of the traditional region of Lower Carniola and is now included in the Southeast Slovenia Statistical Region.

== Name ==
The name Boršt is a relatively frequent name for settlements, regions, and hills in Slovenia. It is derived from the common noun boršt 'woods, forest', borrowed from Middle High German for(e)st 'woods, forest'. Boršt was attested as sancte Margarethe 'Saint Margaret' in 1334 after the former church in the village, and as Vorst in 1438. The church fell into disrepair and was razed in 1925.

== History ==
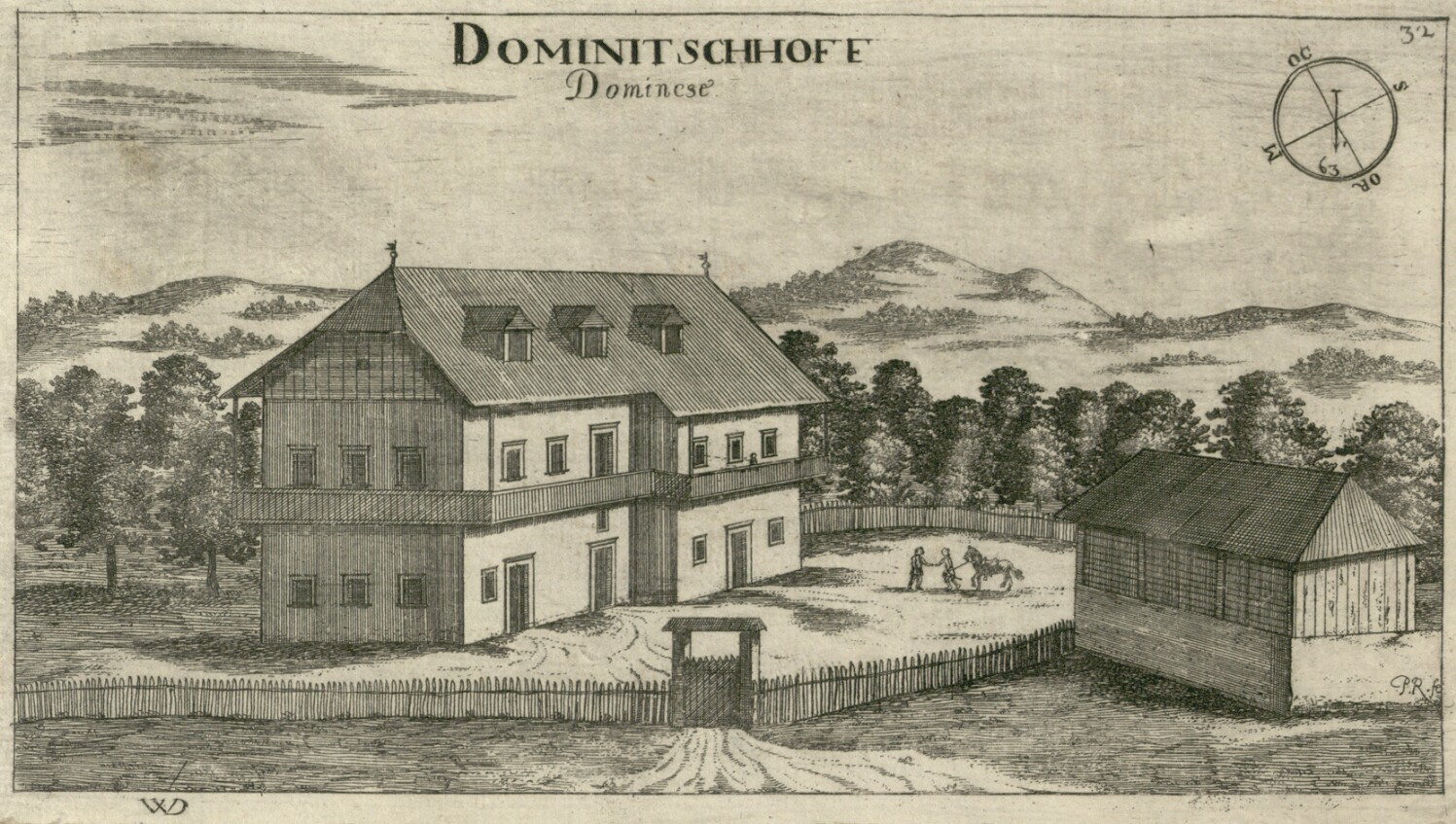
Dominiče Manor

Roman graves have been discovered near the village, testifying to human habitation in antiquity. In 1523 the Seignory of Gradac owned two farms in Boršt. Dominiče Manor (German: Dominitschhoff) stood to the southeast. The structure was built by Peter Dominitsch (Dominič); after his line died out, it came into the hands of the barons of Gusič, who owned the castle at Gradac. The manor later fell into decay.

== Climate ==
A weather station exists there at an elevation of 141 metres (463 ft). The minimum recorded temperature for the winter of 2024–2025 was −8.9 °C (16.0 °F), on February 20th.
