= Josip Kopinič =

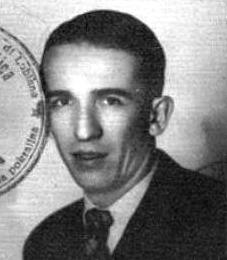
Josip Kopinič Portrait

Josip Kopinič (nom de guerre: Vokšin, Aleksandar, Vazduh, Valdes; 18 February 1911 in Radoviči, Austria-Hungary – 26 May 1997 in Ljubljana, Slovenia) was a Slovenian communist and close associate of Josip Broz Tito.

In 1931 Kopinič joined the Communist Party of Slovenia (KPS), and shortly later was sent to Moscow. In 1936 he was sent by the Comintern as "military counsellor" to help the Republic as the Spanish Civil War started. There he became commander of the Spanish Republican Navy yard at Cartagena. Then, from 1936 to 1938 he served on the republican submarine flotilla. Together with I. A. Burmistrov and N. P. Yegipko, Kopinič, in spring 1938, Kopinič participated to the hazardous journeys which their submarines made from France, where they had been repaired, along the Atlantic coast of the Iberian Peninsula through the Straits of Gibraltar to Cartagena, i.e., a route almost entirely controlled by the nationalist forces.

After the Spanish Civil War Kopinič stayed in Paris as Spanish republican diplomat, provided also with a Soviet passport. During World War II Kopinič headed the chief Soviet intelligence center in Zagreb, part of the Red Orchestra network, and was instructed by the Comintern to establish a new party organization independent from the KPJ.

Kopinič set up a radio-transmitter in Zagreb in 1940 which become the major information point between the Italian and Greek communist parties and the Comintern in Moscow. Also for this reason, it seems, the KPJ preserved pre-eminence in the Southeastern European region, backed by the Comintern. That lasted up to the Cominform Resolution of 28 June 1948 (resulting from the Tito–Stalin split).

From 1946 to 1949 Kopinič was in Turkey but nothing is known about this period except that he continued to work as a Soviet intelligence officer. Following the Tito–Stalin split Kopinič returned to Yugoslavia. In 1951 he became director of the Uljanik shipyard in Pula, where he stayed until his retirement.

He died on 26 May 1997, aged 86, in Ljubljana, Slovenia.
