= Geršiči =

- Location in Slovenia
- Coordinates: 45°37′31.01″N 15°15′49.15″E
- Country: Slovenia
- Traditional region: White Carniola
- Statistical region: Southeast Slovenia
- Municipality: Metlika

Area
  - Total: 1.5 km^{2} (0.58 sq mi)
- Elevation: 146.4 m (480 ft)

Population (2002)
  - Total: 52
- Postal code: 8332

Geršiči (pronounced [ˈɡeːɾʃitʃi]) is a small settlement in the hills north of Gradac in the Municipality of Metlika in the White Carniola area of southeastern Slovenia. The railway line from Novo Mesto to Metlika runs just north of the settlement. The entire area is part of the traditional region of Lower Carniola and is now included in the Southeast Slovenia Statistical Region.
