= Okljuka =

- Location in Slovenia
- Coordinates: 45°36′8.26″N 15°14′29.38″E
- Country: Slovenia
- Traditional region: White Carniola
- Statistical region: Southeast Slovenia
- Municipality: Metlika

Area
  - Total: 1.09 km^{2} (0.42 sq mi)
- Elevation: 154.7 m (508 ft)

Population (2002)
  - Total: 17
- Postal code: 8332

Okljuka (pronounced [ɔˈkljuːka]) is a small settlement on the right bank of the Lahinja River, south of Gradac in the Municipality of Metlika in the White Carniola area of southeastern Slovenia. The entire area is part of the traditional region of Lower Carniola and is now included in the Southeast Slovenia Statistical Region.
