= Grm pri Podzemlju =

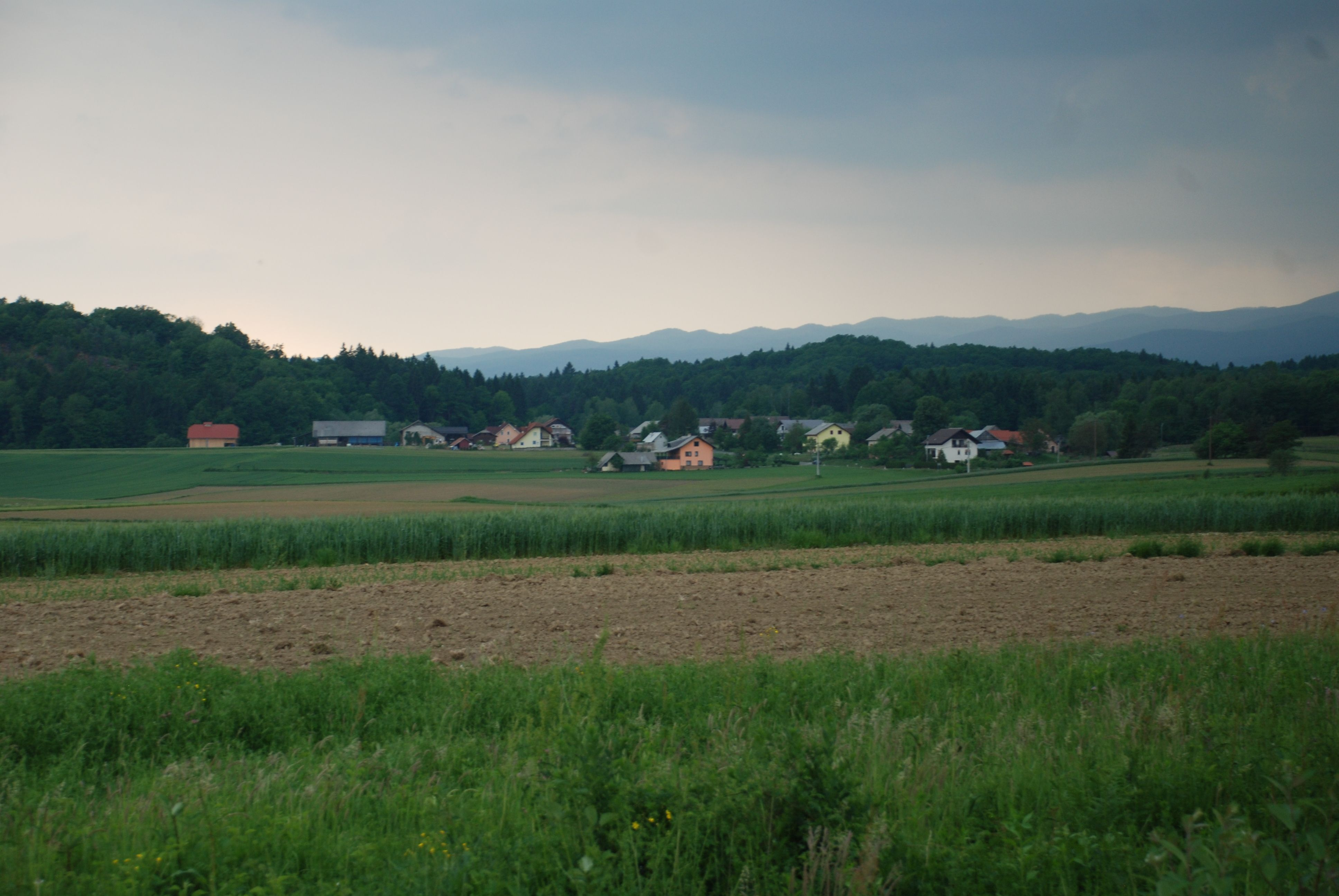
- View of Grm pri Podzemlju from the nearby Otok DC-3 Airplane Memorial

- Location in Slovenia
- Coordinates: 45°37′2.7″N 15°16′42.56″E
- Country: Slovenia
- Traditional region: White Carniola
- Statistical region: Southeast Slovenia
- Municipality: Metlika

Area
  - Total: 1.51 km^{2} (0.58 sq mi)
- Elevation: 156.3 m (513 ft)

Population (2002)
  - Total: 56
- Postal code: 8332

Grm pri Podzemlju (pronounced [ˈɡəɾm pɾi pɔdˈzeːmlju]) is a small settlement on the left bank of the Kolpa River north of Podzemelj in the Municipality of Metlika in the White Carniola area of southeastern Slovenia. The entire area is part of the traditional region of Lower Carniola and is now included in the Southeast Slovenia Statistical Region.

== Name ==
The name of the settlement was changed from Grm to Grm pri Podzemlju in 1955.
