= Boginja Vas =

- Location in Slovenia
- Coordinates: 45°35′38″N 15°15′42″E
- Country: Slovenia
- Traditional region: White Carniola
- Statistical region: Southeast Slovenia
- Municipality: Metlika

Area
  - Total: 2.1 km^{2} (0.81 sq mi)
- Elevation: 295.7 m (970 ft)

Population (2002)
  - Total: 17
- Postal code: 8331

Boginja Vas (pronounced [bɔˈɡiːnja ˈʋaːs]; Slovene: Boginja vas) is a small settlement south of Gradac in the Municipality of Metlika in the White Carniola area of southeastern Slovenia. The entire area is part of the traditional region of Lower Carniola and is now included in the Southeast Slovenia Statistical Region.

== Name ==
Boginja Vas was attested in written sources as Wogindarff in 1438 and Wochenstorf in 1490.
