= Mlake =

Mlake may refer to the following places in Slovenia:

- Mlake, Muta
- Mlake, Metlika
