= Gornje Dobravice =

- Location in Slovenia
- Coordinates: 45°38′27.3″N 15°16′19.43″E
- Country: Slovenia
- Traditional region: White Carniola
- Statistical region: Southeast Slovenia
- Municipality: Metlika

Area
  - Total: 1.71 km^{2} (0.66 sq mi)
- Elevation: 182.3 m (598 ft)

Population (2002)
  - Total: 45
- Postal code: 8332

Gornje Dobravice (pronounced [ˈɡoːɾnjɛ dɔˈbɾaːʋitsɛ]; German: Dobrawitz) is a settlement west of the town of Metlika in the White Carniola area of southeastern Slovenia. The entire area is part of the traditional region of Lower Carniola and is now included in the Southeast Slovenia Statistical Region.

The local church is dedicated to the Virgin Mary and belongs to the Parish of Podzemelj. It is a small building with a rounded apse, built in 1889 on the site of an earlier chapel.
