= Dragomlja Vas =

- Location in Slovenia
- Coordinates: 45°40′41.78″N 15°16′0.22″E
- Country: Slovenia
- Traditional region: White Carniola
- Statistical region: Southeast Slovenia
- Municipality: Metlika

Area
  - Total: 3.36 km^{2} (1.30 sq mi)
- Elevation: 302.7 m (993 ft)

Population (2002)
  - Total: 103
- Postal code: 8331

Dragomlja Vas (pronounced [dɾaˈɡomlja ˈʋaːs]; Slovene: Dragomlja vas, German: Dragomelsdorf) is a small settlement south of Bereča Vas in the Municipality of Metlika in the White Carniola area of southeastern Slovenia. The entire area is part of the traditional region of Lower Carniola and is now included in the Southeast Slovenia Statistical Region.
