= Sela pri Jugorju =

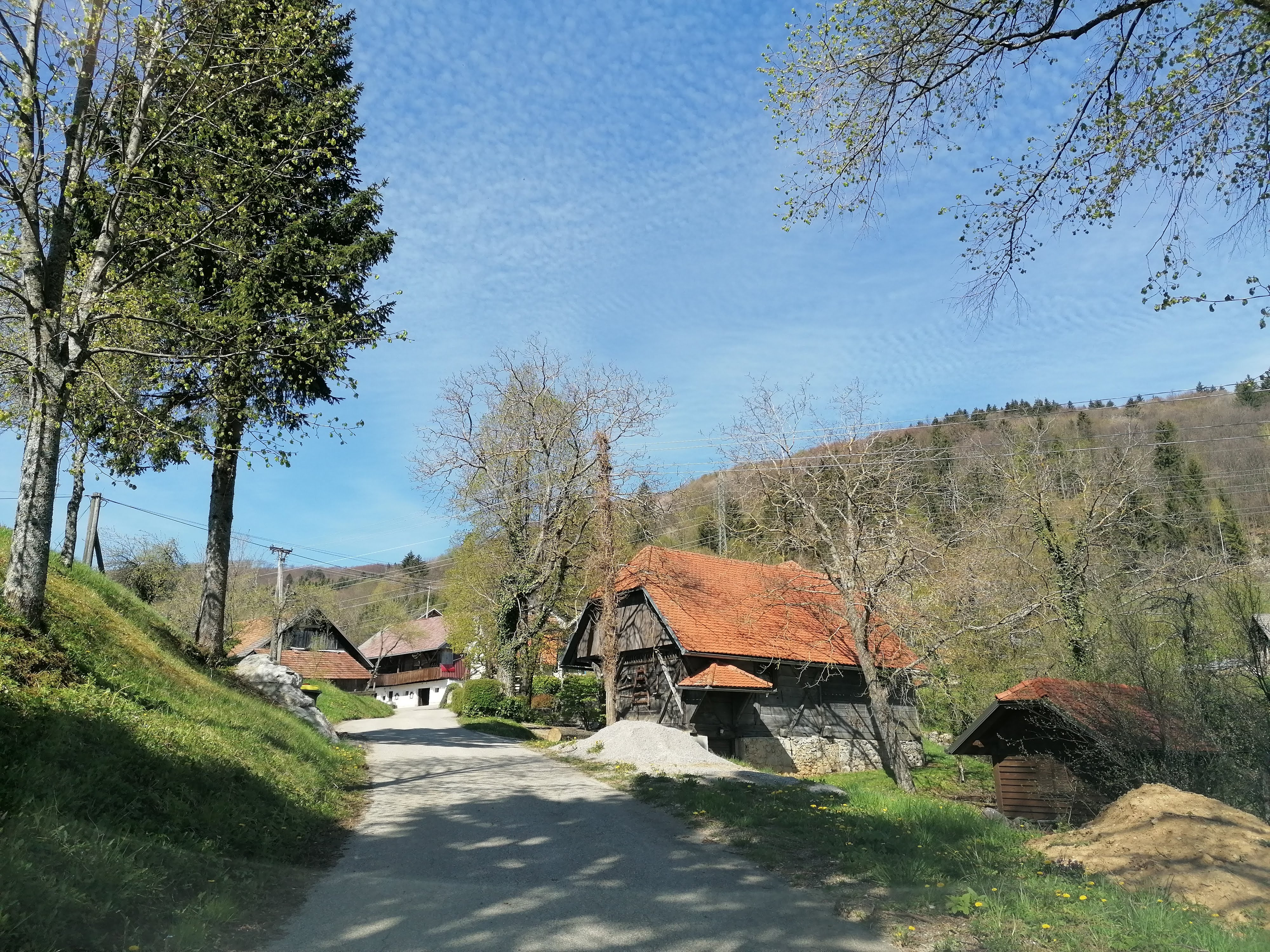

- Location in Slovenia
- Coordinates: 45°42′31.9″N 15°13′38.8″E
- Country: Slovenia
- Traditional region: White Carniola
- Statistical region: Southeast Slovenia
- Municipality: Metlika

Area
  - Total: 1.11 km^{2} (0.43 sq mi)
- Elevation: 526.5 m (1,727 ft)

Population (2002)
  - Total: 38
- Postal code: 8331

Sela pri Jugorju (pronounced [ˈseːla pɾi ˈjuːɡɔɾju]; German: Sela bei Jugorje) is a small settlement west of Jugorje in the Municipality of Metlika in the White Carniola area of southeastern Slovenia. The area is part of the traditional region of Lower Carniola and is now included in the Southeast Slovenia Statistical Region. It includes the hamlet of Luža (German: Lacken).
