= Klošter =

- Location in Slovenia
- Coordinates: 45°37′3.66″N 15°14′23.16″E
- Country: Slovenia
- Traditional region: White Carniola
- Statistical region: Southeast Slovenia
- Municipality: Metlika

Area
  - Total: 0.71 km^{2} (0.27 sq mi)
- Elevation: 156.7 m (514 ft)

Population (2002)
  - Total: 80
- Postal code: 8332

Klošter (pronounced [ˈkloːʃtəɾ]; German: Kloster) is a settlement on the left bank of the Lahinja River in the Municipality of Metlika in the White Carniola area of southeastern Slovenia. The entire area is part of the traditional region of Lower Carniola and is now included in the Southeast Slovenia Statistical Region.

The local church, built north of the settlement, at the confluence of the Krupa with the Lahinja, is dedicated to the Virgin Mary and belongs to the Parish of Podzemelj. It was built in the second half of the 15th century and was remodelled in the Baroque syle when it was extended in the 17th century. The belfry was added in 1828.
