= Grabrovec =

Grabrovec may refer to:

- Grabrovec, Slovenia, a village near Metlika, Slovenia
- Grabrovec, Croatia, a village near Zabok, Croatia
