= Bušinja Vas =

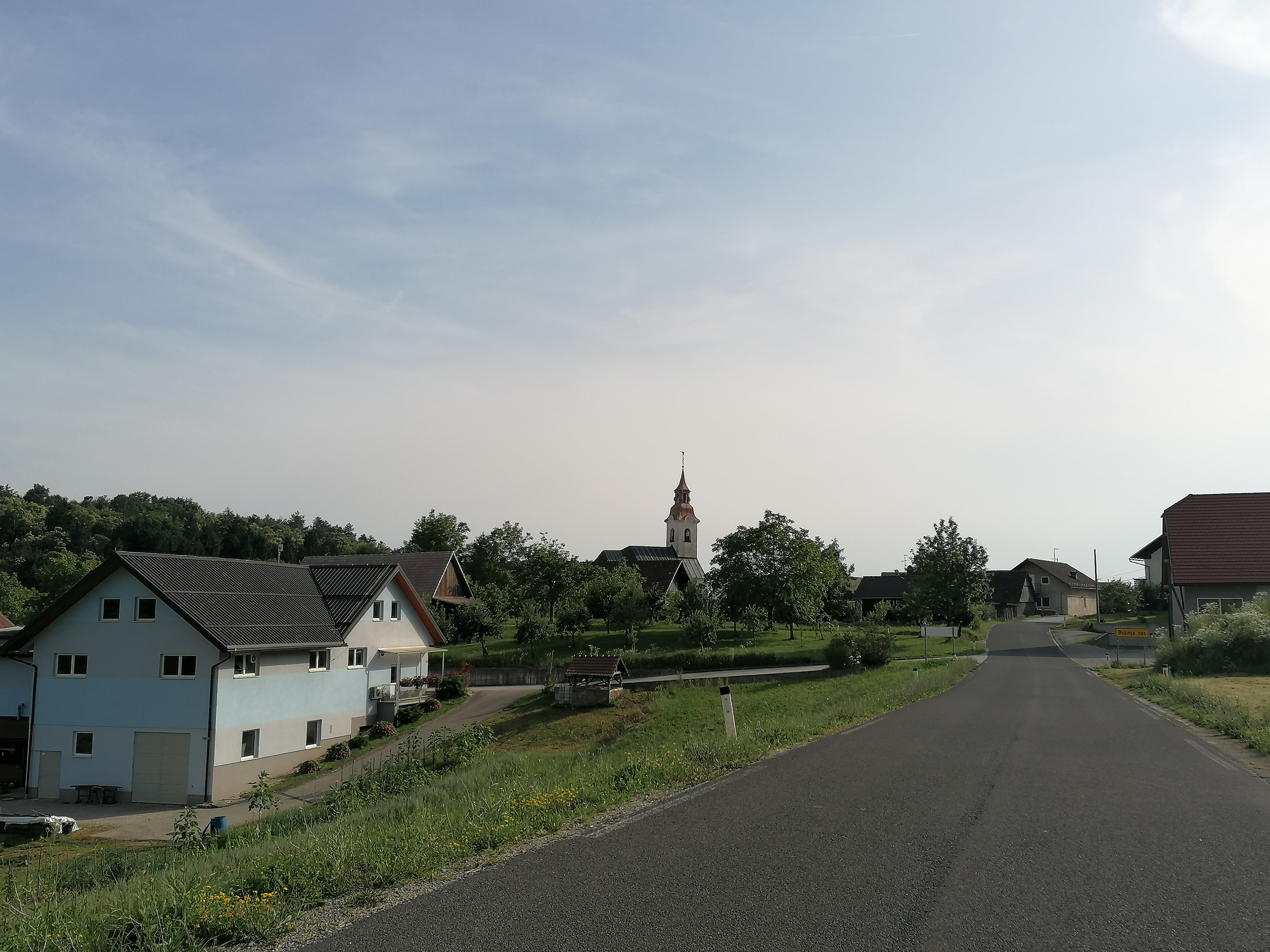

- Location in Slovenia
- Coordinates: 45°40′55.21″N 15°17′10.99″E
- Country: Slovenia
- Traditional region: White Carniola
- Statistical region: Southeast Slovenia
- Municipality: Metlika

Area
  - Total: 1.25 km^{2} (0.48 sq mi)
- Elevation: 309 m (1,014 ft)

Population (2025)
  - Total: 120
- Postal code: 8331

Bušinja Vas (pronounced [buˈʃiːnja ˈʋaːs]; Slovene: Bušinja vas, German: Wuschinsdorf) is a settlement in the Municipality of Metlika in the White Carniola area of southeastern Slovenia. The area is part of the traditional region of Lower Carniola and is now included in the Southeast Slovenia Statistical Region.

The local church, built on the eastern edge of the village, is dedicated to Saint Mark and belongs to the Parish of Suhor. It is a Baroque building, first mentioned in written documents dating to 1689.
