= Krašnji Vrh =

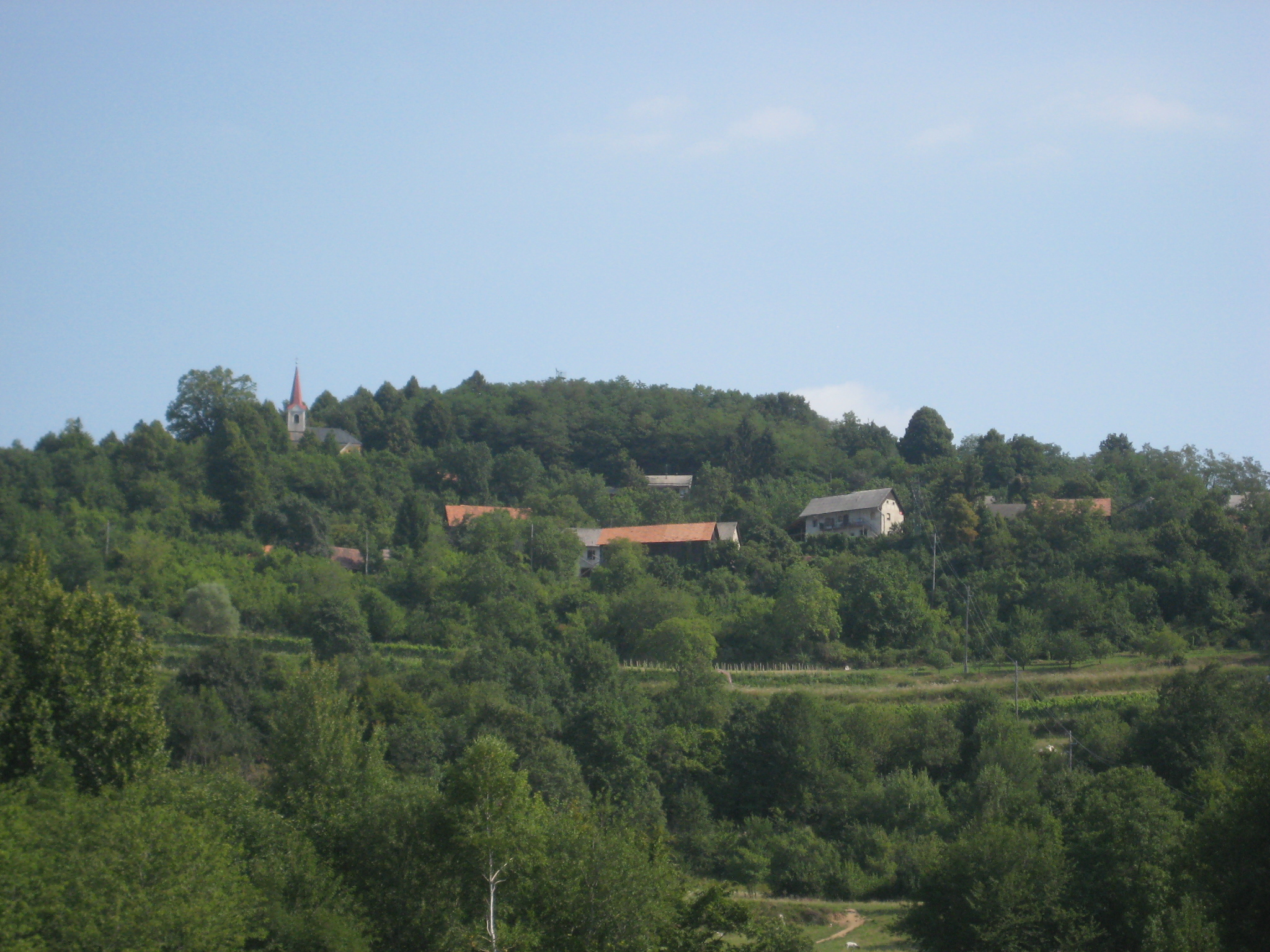

- Location in Slovenia
- Coordinates: 45°42′9.73″N 15°20′57.45″E
- Country: Slovenia
- Traditional region: White Carniola
- Statistical region: Southeast Slovenia
- Municipality: Metlika

Area
  - Total: 2.35 km^{2} (0.91 sq mi)
- Elevation: 498.3 m (1,635 ft)

Population (2002)
  - Total: 29
- Postal code: 8330

Krašnji Vrh (pronounced [ˈkɾaːʃnji ˈʋəɾx]; German: Kraschenberg) is a small village in the Municipality of Metlika in the White Carniola area of southeastern Slovenia, right on the border with Croatia. The area is part of the traditional region of Lower Carniola and is now included in the Southeast Slovenia Statistical Region.

== Geography ==
Krašnji Vrh is a clustered village at the southwest foot of the Žumberak Mountains. Nearby elevations include Crow Peak (Vranji vrh) and Rtič Hill. A band of marl passes through the area, which otherwise has a limestone character and karst features. Fields lie on terraces below the village. There are pastures and wooded land to the north. A karst cave known as "The Man's House" (Moževa hiša) or Wild Man Cave (Jama divjega moža) lies near the village, and Orehovec Spring below the village supplies drinking water.

== Name ==
The name Krašnji Vrh means 'cliff peak, rocky peak', referring to the local geography.

== Church ==
The local church is dedicated to the Holy Trinity and belongs to the Parish of Radovica. It was built in the 18th century. The main altar dates to 1865 and is the work of Jernej Jereb (1838–1929). The Stations of the Cross were painted by Anton Postl (18th c.).

== Notable people ==
Notable people that were born or lived in Krašnji Vrh include:

- Anton Ivan Režek (1867–1946), missionary to the United States and historian
