= Drage, Metlika =

Drage
- Location in Slovenia
- Coordinates: 45°40′48.51″N 15°16′30.75″E
- Country: Slovenia
- Traditional region: White Carniola
- Statistical region: Southeast Slovenia
- Municipality: Metlika

Area
  - Total: 1.4 km^{2} (0.54 sq mi)
- Elevation: 295.7 m (970 ft)

Population (2002)
  - Total: 155
- Postal code: 8331

Drage (pronounced [ˈdɾaːɡɛ]) is a settlement in the foothills of the Gorjanci range in the Municipality of Metlika in southeastern Slovenia. The entire area is part of the traditional region of Lower Carniola and is now included in the Southeast Slovenia Statistical Region.

There is a small Greek Catholic church in the village, one of only two churches of this rite in Slovenia (the second is in Metlika). It is dedicated to the Nativity of the Theotokos and was built in the early 20th century.
