= Kamenica, Metlika =

Kamenica
- Location in Slovenia
- Coordinates: 45°40′53.09″N 15°21′59.36″E
- Country: Slovenia
- Traditional region: White Carniola
- Statistical region: Southeast Slovenia
- Municipality: Metlika

Area
  - Total: 0.66 km^{2} (0.25 sq mi)
- Elevation: 316.4 m (1,038 ft)

Population (2022)
  - Total: 14
- Postal code: 8330

Kamenica (pronounced [ˈkaːmɛnitsa]) is a small settlement in the Municipality of Metlika in the White Carniola area of southeastern Slovenia, right on the border with Croatia. The entire area is part of the traditional region of Lower Carniola and is now included in the Southeast Slovenia Statistical Region.
