= Slamna Vas =

- Village
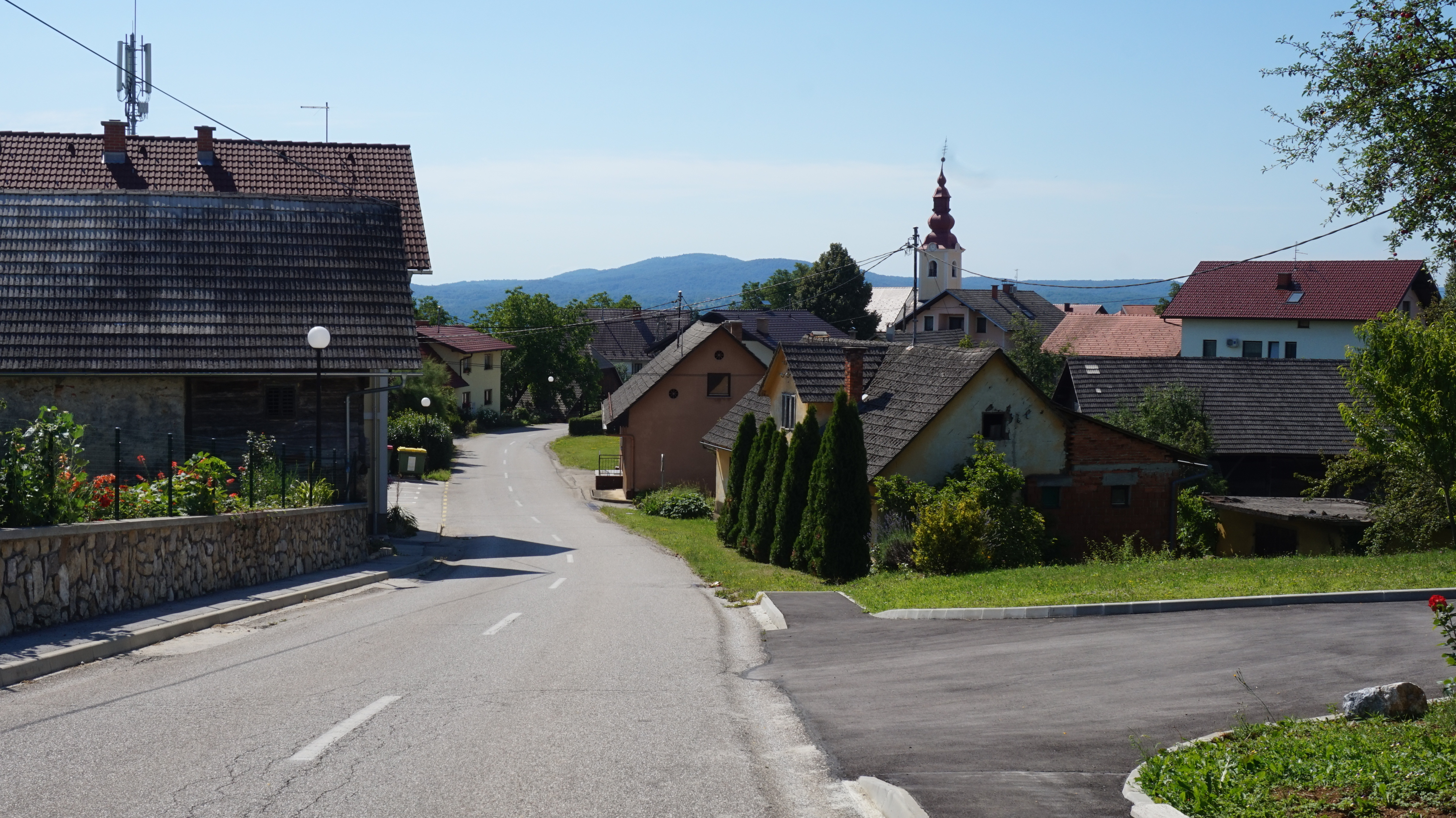

- Location in Slovenia
- Coordinates: 45°40′23.31″N 15°20′7.34″E
- Country: Slovenia
- Traditional region: White Carniola
- Statistical region: Southeast Slovenia
- Municipality: Metlika

Area
  - Total: 1.97 km^{2} (0.76 sq mi)
- Elevation: 264.6 m (868 ft)

Population (2020)
  - Total: 119
  - Density: 60.4/km^{2} (156/sq mi)
- Postal code: 8330

Slamna Vas (pronounced [ˈslaːmna ˈʋaːs]; Slovene: Slamna vas, German: Sleindorf) is a village north of the town of Metlika in the White Carniola area of southeastern Slovenia, on the border with Croatia. The area is part of the traditional region of Lower Carniola and is now included in the Southeast Slovenia Statistical Region.

== Name ==
Slamna Vas was attested in written sources in 1431 and 1490 as Slawndorf (and as Slandorf in 1490 and 1763–87, and also as Slamdorf in 1763–87). The medieval attestations indicate that the name is derived from *Slavna vas 'Slavo's village', with the first element referring to a hypocorism for a personal name such as *Dobroslavъ, *Pribyslavъ, etc. The assimilation of -vn- > -mn-, which produced the modern name, is attested elsewhere in Slovene. In the past the German name was Sleindorf.

== History ==
The 1431 source mentioning Slamna Vas (Slawndorf) is dated April 29 and is a declaration by Andre von Süssenheim (today Dobrina) regarding the sale of lands in the village. He confirmed that the lands were sold for the sum of 96 pounds of Viennese pennies (sechsundnewnczig phundt guter Wienner phennyng; i.e., 96 gulden) and renounced all future rights to them in his name and that of his heirs.

== Church ==
The local church is dedicated to the Holy Cross and belongs to the Parish of Metlika. It was built in the 18th century in the Baroque style and was extensively rebuilt in 1841.
