= Ravnace =

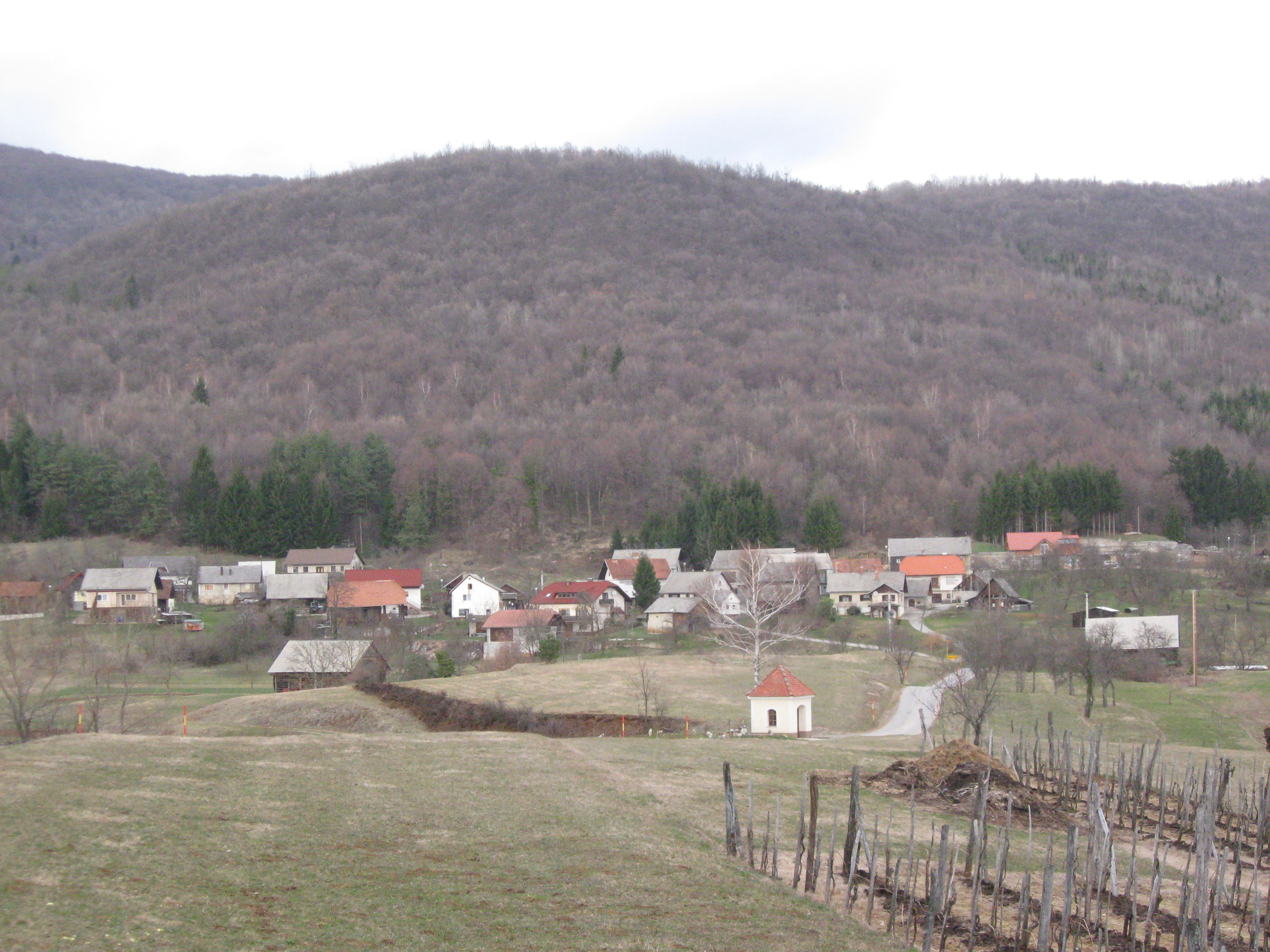

- Location in Slovenia
- Coordinates: 45°41′57.55″N 15°16′13.06″E
- Country: Slovenia
- Traditional region: White Carniola
- Statistical region: Southeast Slovenia
- Municipality: Metlika

Area
  - Total: 1.59 km^{2} (0.61 sq mi)
- Elevation: 411 m (1,348 ft)

Population (2002)
  - Total: 34
- Postal code: 8331

Ravnace (pronounced [ɾau̯ˈnaːtsɛ]) is a settlement in the southern foothills of the Gorjanci range in the Municipality of Metlika in the White Carniola area of southeastern Slovenia. It is part of the traditional region of Lower Carniola and is now included in the Southeast Slovenia Statistical Region.
