= Vidošiči =

- Location in Slovenia
- Coordinates: 45°40′29.43″N 15°22′1.97″E
- Country: Slovenia
- Traditional region: White Carniola
- Statistical region: Southeast Slovenia
- Municipality: Metlika

Area
  - Total: 1.34 km^{2} (0.52 sq mi)
- Elevation: 258.6 m (848 ft)

Population (2002)
  - Total: 19
- Postal code: 8330

Vidošiči (pronounced [ˈʋiːdɔʃitʃi]; German: Widoschitz) is a dispersed settlement in the Municipality of Metlika in the White Carniola area of southeastern Slovenia, next to the border with Croatia. The area is part of the traditional region of Lower Carniola and is now included in the Southeast Slovenia Statistical Region.

The local church, built on a hill northeast of the village, is dedicated to Saint Anne and belongs to the Parish of Metlika. It was built in the early 19th century.
