= Svržaki =

- Location in Slovenia
- Coordinates: 45°39′29″N 15°19′29.13″E
- Country: Slovenia
- Traditional region: White Carniola
- Statistical region: Southeast Slovenia
- Municipality: Metlika

Area
  - Total: 0.98 km^{2} (0.38 sq mi)
- Elevation: 206.9 m (679 ft)

Population (2002)
  - Total: 88
- Postal code: 8330

Svržaki (pronounced [sʋəɾˈʒaːki]) is a settlement immediately north of the town of Metlika in the White Carniola area of southeastern Slovenia. The entire area is part of the traditional region of Lower Carniola and is now included in the Southeast Slovenia Statistical Region.
