= Križevska Vas, Metlika =

Križevska Vas
- Location in Slovenia
- Coordinates: 45°38′2.59″N 15°16′57.18″E
- Country: Slovenia
- Traditional region: White Carniola
- Statistical region: Southeast Slovenia
- Municipality: Metlika

Area
  - Total: 4.64 km^{2} (1.79 sq mi)
- Elevation: 145.5 m (477 ft)

Population (2002)
  - Total: 193
- Postal code: 8330

Križevska Vas (pronounced [kɾiˈʒeːu̯ska ˈʋaːs]; Slovene: Križevska vas, German: Kreuzdorf) is a settlement on the left bank of the Kolpa River south of Metlika in the White Carniola area of southeastern Slovenia. The area is part of the traditional region of Lower Carniola and is now included in the Southeast Slovenia Statistical Region.
