= Jugorje pri Metliki =

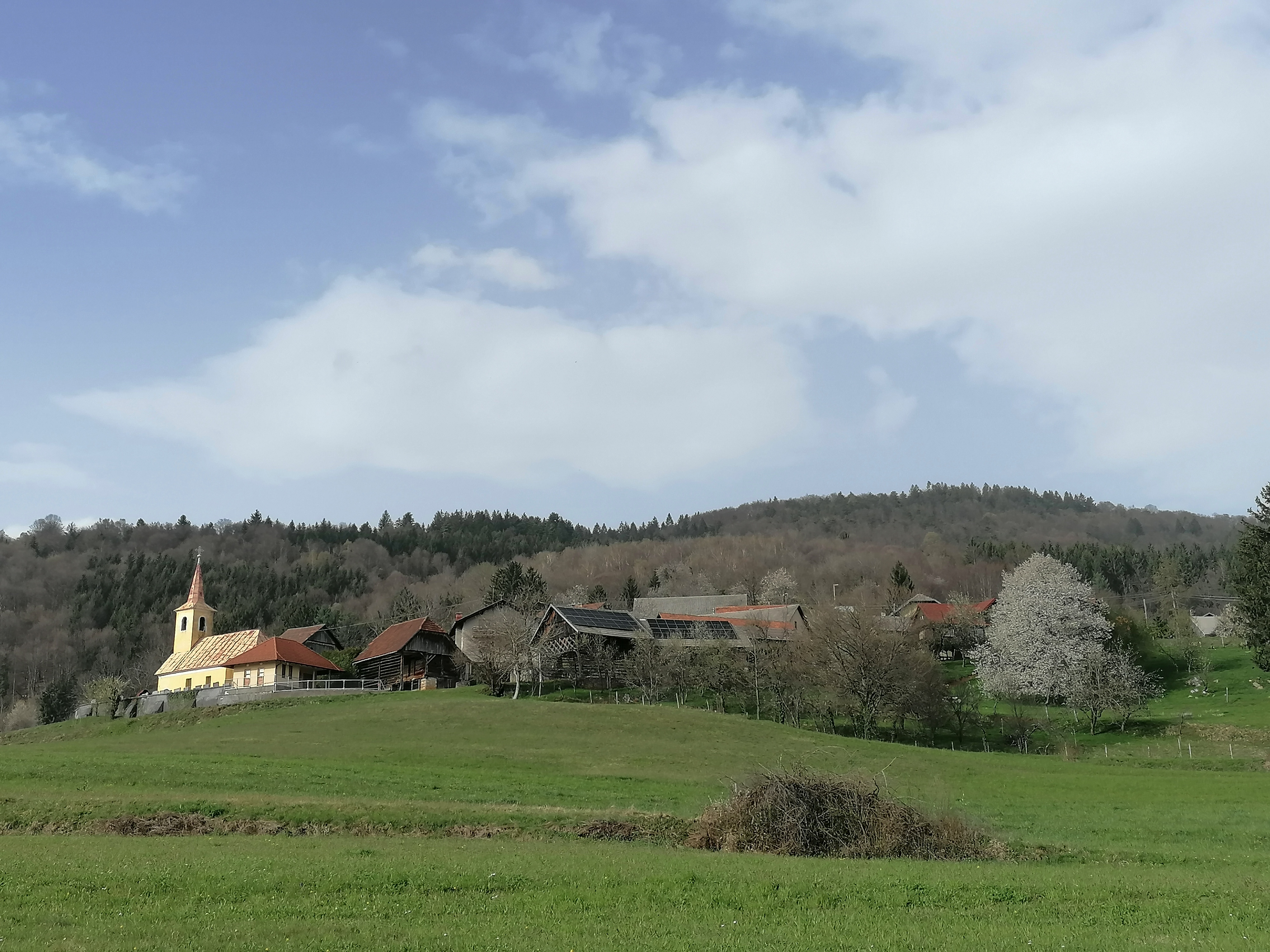

- Location in Slovenia
- Coordinates: 45°42′35.39″N 15°14′13.95″E
- Country: Slovenia
- Traditional region: White Carniola
- Statistical region: Southeast Slovenia
- Municipality: Metlika

Area
  - Total: 1.35 km^{2} (0.52 sq mi)
- Elevation: 526.9 m (1,729 ft)

Population (2002)
  - Total: 39
- Postal code: 8331

Jugorje pri Metliki (pronounced [ˈjuːɡɔɾjɛ pɾi mɛˈtliːki]) is a small settlement in the Municipality of Metlika in the White Carniola area of southeastern Slovenia. The entire area is part of the traditional region of Lower Carniola and is now included in the Southeast Slovenia Statistical Region.

== Name ==
The oldest records mention only the church in Jugorje (zu Sannd Veit in 1462), and the settlement itself did not appear in written records until 1763–87 (as Jugorie). The etymology of the name is unclear. The name of the settlement was changed from Jugorje to Jugorje pri Metliki in 1953.

== Church ==
The local church is dedicated to Saint Vitus and belongs to the Parish of Suhor. It was first mentioned in written documents dating to 1354.
