= Božič Vrh =

- Location in Slovenia
- Coordinates: 45°42′17.89″N 15°14′18.04″E
- Country: Slovenia
- Traditional region: White Carniola
- Statistical region: Southeast Slovenia
- Municipality: Metlika

Area
  - Total: 0.71 km^{2} (0.27 sq mi)
- Elevation: 527.2 m (1,730 ft)

Population (2002)
  - Total: 7
- Postal code: 8331

Božič Vrh (pronounced [ˈbɔːʒitʃ ˈʋəɾx]) is a small settlement in the Municipality of Metlika in the White Carniola area of southeastern Slovenia. The entire area is part of the traditional region of Lower Carniola and is now included in the Southeast Slovenia Statistical Region.

== Name ==
Božič Vrh was attested in written sources as Woschitschen perg and Woschytzenperg in 1477.
