= Mačkovec pri Suhorju =

- Location in Slovenia
- Coordinates: 45°42′23.04″N 15°14′35.17″E
- Country: Slovenia
- Traditional region: White Carniola
- Statistical region: Southeast Slovenia
- Municipality: Metlika

Area
  - Total: 0.58 km^{2} (0.22 sq mi)
- Elevation: 503.4 m (1,652 ft)

Population (2002)
  - Total: 8
- Postal code: 8331

Mačkovec pri Suhorju (pronounced [matʃˈkɔːʋəts pɾi ˈsuːxɔɾju] or [matʃˈkoː-]) is a small settlement in the foothills of the Gorjanci Mountains in the Municipality of Metlika in the White Carniola area of southeastern Slovenia. It is part of the traditional region of Lower Carniola and is now included in the Southeast Slovenia Statistical Region.

== Name ==
The name of the settlement was changed from Mačkovec to Mačkovec pri Suhorju in 1955.
