= Otok, Metlika =

Otok
- Location in Slovenia
- Coordinates: 45°36′53.8″N 15°17′42.07″E
- Country: Slovenia
- Traditional region: White Carniola
- Statistical region: Southeast Slovenia
- Municipality: Metlika

Area
  - Total: 1.99 km^{2} (0.77 sq mi)
- Elevation: 140.8 m (462 ft)

Population (2002)
  - Total: 67
- Postal code: 8332

Otok (pronounced [ˈɔːtɔk]) is a village on the left bank of the Kolpa River in the Municipality of Metlika in the White Carniola area of southeastern Slovenia, right on the border with Croatia. The area is part of the traditional region of Lower Carniola and is now included in the Southeast Slovenia Statistical Region.

Roman remains including a villa rustica have been found close to the settlement.

== World War II ==
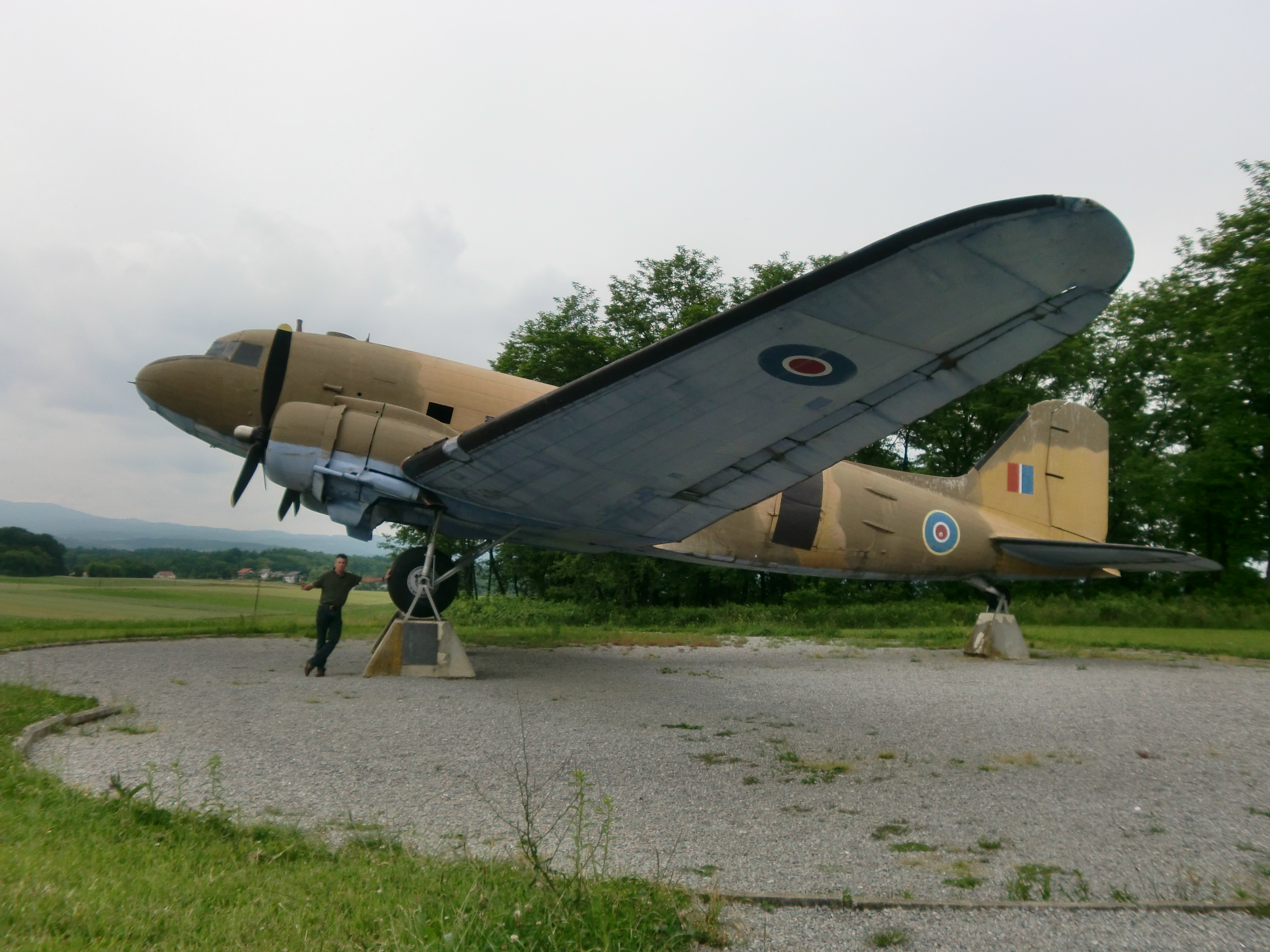
Douglas C-47 Skytrain aircraft (World War II memorial) in Otok

A Partisan airport was located near Otok during World War II. The building of the simple grass runway began in spring 1944. The airport was ready for operation in June. Its military code name was EKG 2 and the commander was Stane Oberstal. The first aircraft landed there in September the same year. The airport was used by Allied airforces in order to deliver humanitarian and military aid, and to evacuate wounded and other people. It was used by Soviet aircraft until the end of 1944 and by British and American aircraft until March 1945. The airport was part of three other Partisan airports in the vicinity: Krasinec, Griblje, and Prilozje after the first airport Podlesk ceased operation in September 1944. Today an original DC-3 airplane on the fields near Otok serves as a memorial for the airport and the Allied help.
