= Trnovec, Metlika =

Trnovec
- Location in Slovenia
- Coordinates: 45°39′57.22″N 15°17′25.52″E
- Country: Slovenia
- Traditional region: White Carniola
- Statistical region: Southeast Slovenia
- Municipality: Metlika

Area
  - Total: 1.41 km^{2} (0.54 sq mi)
- Elevation: 220.6 m (724 ft)

Population (2002)
  - Total: 97
- Postal code: 8330

Trnovec (pronounced [təɾˈnɔːʋəts] or [təɾˈnoːʋəts]) is a village in the Municipality of Metlika in the White Carniola area of southeastern Slovenia. The entire area is part of the traditional region of Lower Carniola and is now included in the Southeast Slovenia Statistical Region.

== Church ==
Saint Anthony of Padua Church

The local church is dedicated to Saint Anthony of Padua and belongs to the Parish of Metlika. It was built in the 18th century.
