= Municipality of Metlika =

Municipality of Slovenia

Municipality of Metlika Občina Metlika
- Municipality
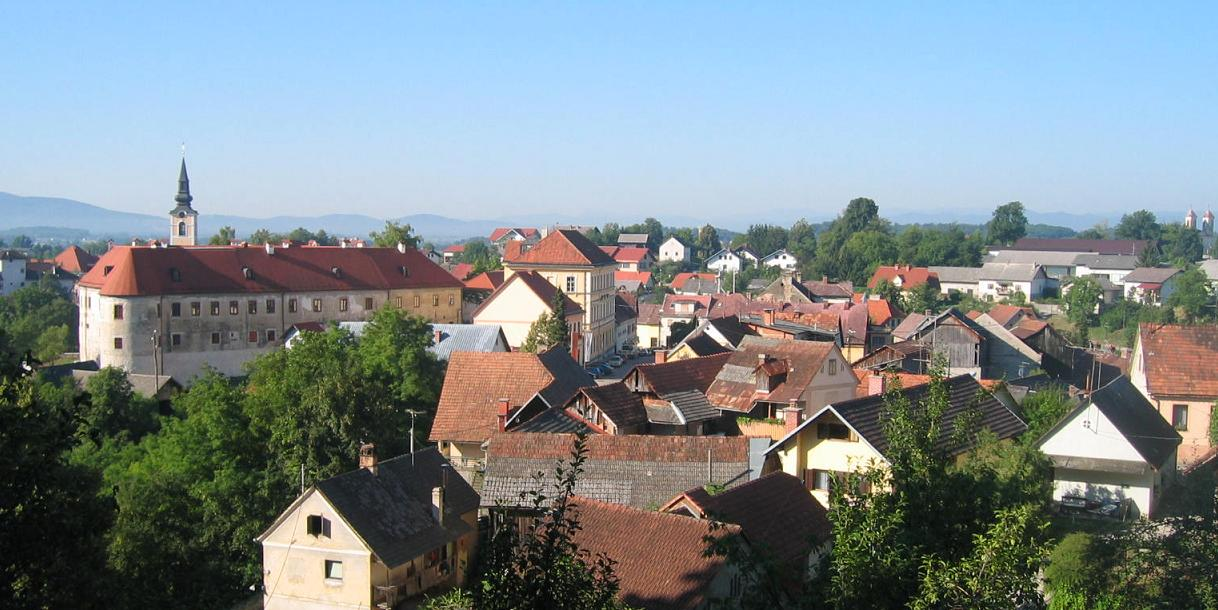

- Location of the Municipality of Metlika in Slovenia
- Coordinates: 45°39′N 15°19′E
- Country: Slovenia

Government
  - Mayor: Martina Legan Janžekovič (Independent)

Area
  - Total: 108.9 km^{2} (42.0 sq mi)

Population (2021)
  - Total: 8,446
  - Density: 77.56/km^{2} (200.9/sq mi)
- Time zone: UTC+01 (CET)
  - Summer (DST): UTC+02 (CEST)
- Website: www.metlika.si

The Municipality of Metlika (pronounced [mɛˈtliːka]; Slovene: Občina Metlika) is a municipality in the traditional region of Lower Carniola in southeastern Slovenia. The seat of the municipality is the town of Metlika. Metlika became a municipality in 1994. It borders Croatia.

== Settlements ==
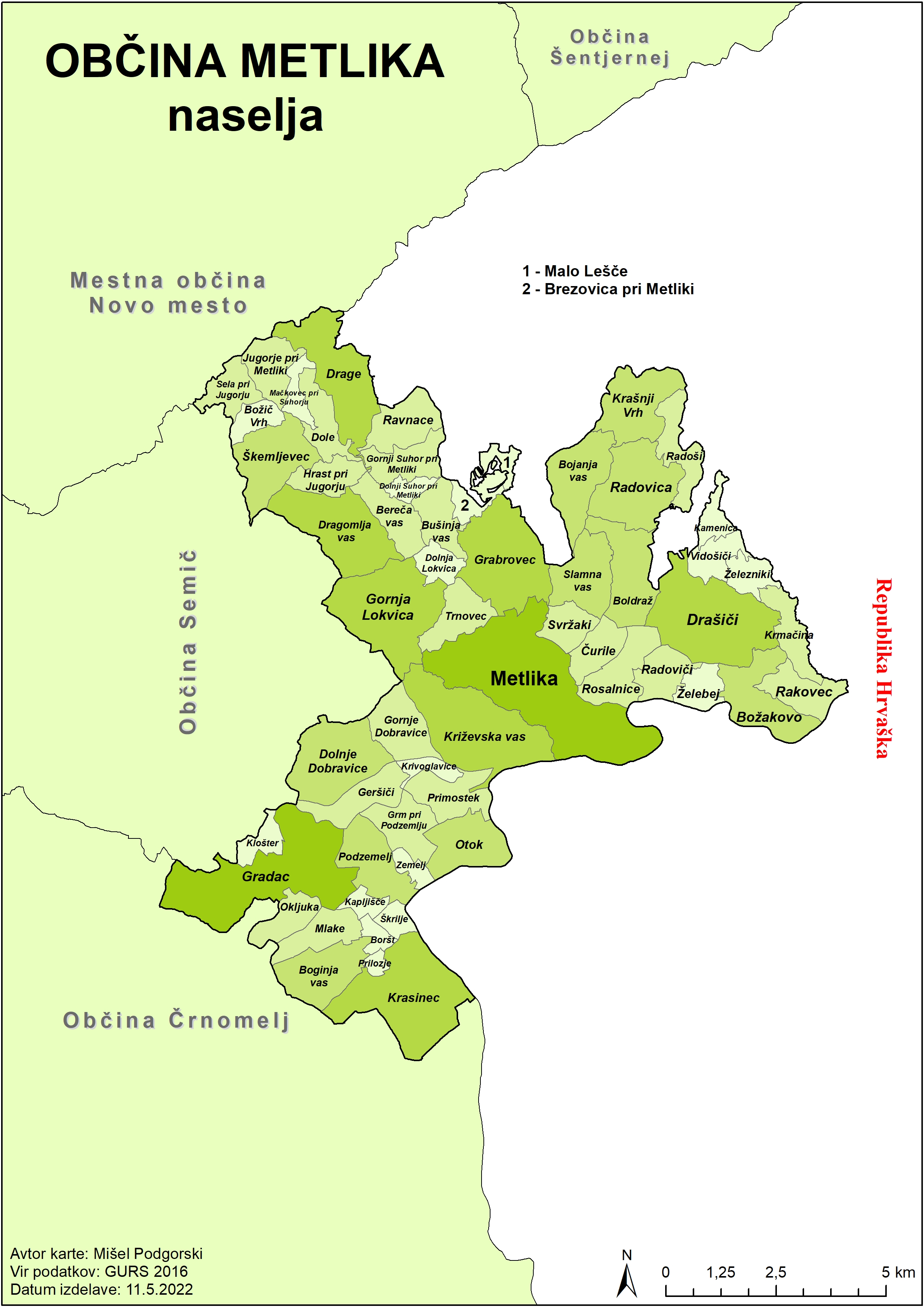
Villages in the municipality

In addition to the municipal seat of Metlika, the municipality also includes the following settlements:

- Bereča Vas
- Boginja Vas
- Bojanja Vas
- Boldraž
- Boršt
- Božakovo
- Božič Vrh
- Brezovica pri Metliki
- Bušinja Vas
- Čurile
- Dole
- Dolnja Lokvica
- Dolnje Dobravice
- Dolnji Suhor pri Metliki
- Drage
- Dragomlja Vas
- Drašiči
- Geršiči
- Gornja Lokvica
- Gornje Dobravice
- Gornji Suhor pri Metliki
- Grabrovec
- Gradac
- Grm pri Podzemlju
- Hrast pri Jugorju
- Jugorje pri Metliki
- Kamenica
- Kapljišče
- Klošter
- Krasinec
- Krašnji Vrh
- Krivoglavice
- Križevska Vas
- Krmačina
- Mačkovec pri Suhorju
- Malo Lešče
- Mlake
- Okljuka
- Otok
- Podzemelj
- Prilozje
- Primostek
- Radoši
- Radovica
- Radoviči
- Rakovec
- Ravnace
- Rosalnice
- Sela pri Jugorju
- Škemljevec
- Škrilje
- Slamna Vas
- Svržaki
- Trnovec
- Vidošiči
- Želebej
- Železniki
- Zemelj
