= Škrilje, Metlika =

Škrilje
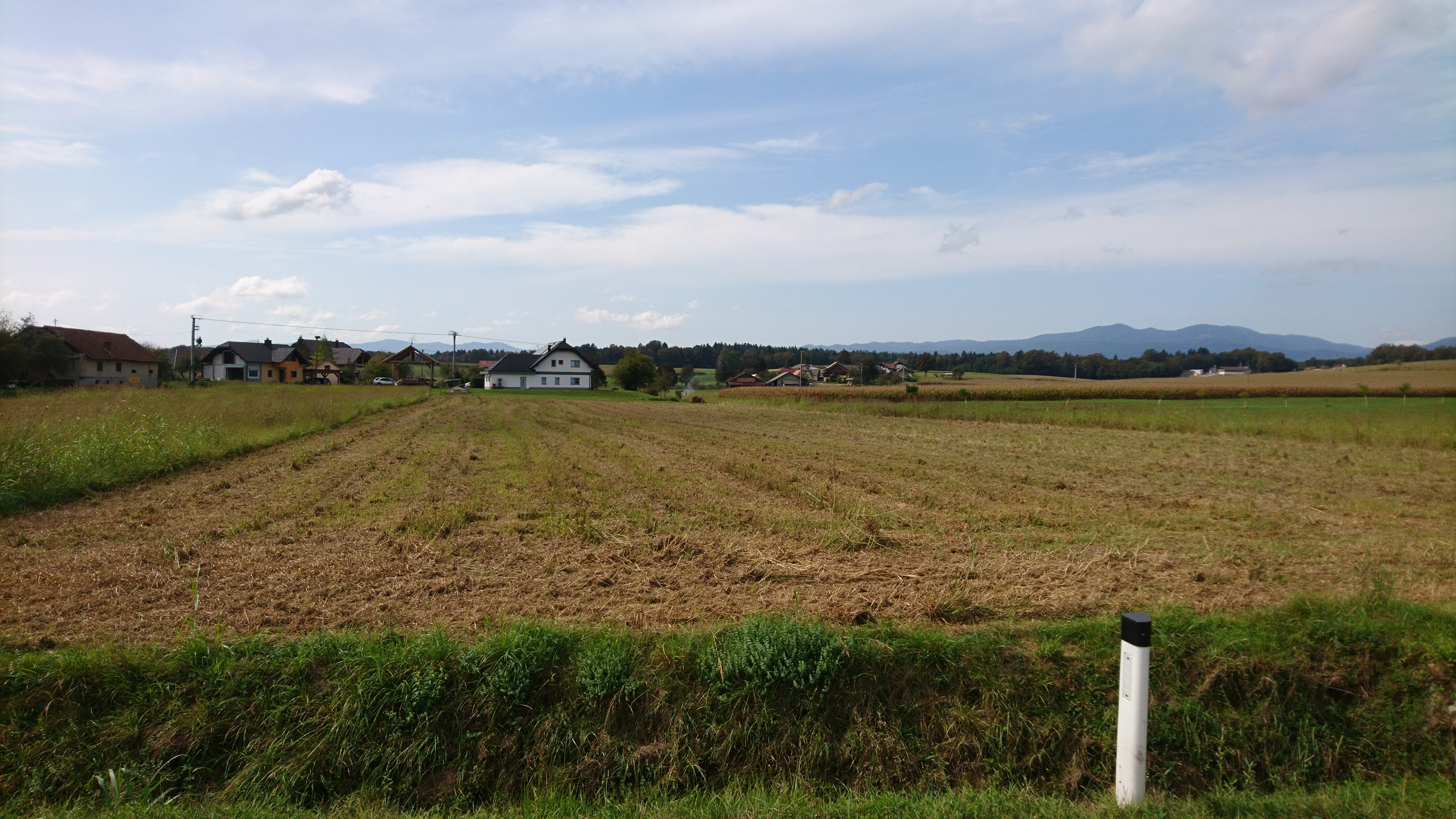

- Location in Slovenia
- Coordinates: 45°36′14.47″N 15°16′24.33″E
- Country: Slovenia
- Traditional region: White Carniola
- Statistical region: Southeast Slovenia
- Municipality: Metlika

Area
  - Total: 0.48 km^{2} (0.19 sq mi)
- Elevation: 139.6 m (458 ft)

Population (2002)
  - Total: 10
- Postal code: 8332

Škrilje (pronounced [ˈʃkɾiːljɛ]) is a small settlement on the left bank of the Kolpa River south of Podzemelj in the Municipality of Metlika in the White Carniola area of southeastern Slovenia. The area is part of the traditional region of Lower Carniola and is now included in the Southeast Slovenia Statistical Region.
