= Hrast pri Jugorju =

- Location in Slovenia
- Coordinates: 45°41′33.03″N 15°15′32.73″E
- Country: Slovenia
- Traditional region: White Carniola
- Statistical region: Southeast Slovenia
- Municipality: Metlika

Area
  - Total: 1.08 km^{2} (0.42 sq mi)
- Elevation: 419.8 m (1,377 ft)

Population (2002)
  - Total: 104
- Postal code: 8331

Hrast pri Jugorju (pronounced [ˈxɾaːst pɾi ˈjuːɡɔɾju]; German: Hrast bei Jugorje) is a settlement in the Municipality of Metlika in the White Carniola area of southeastern Slovenia. The whole of White Carniola is part of the traditional region of Lower Carniola and is now included in the Southeast Slovenia Statistical Region.
