= Bojanja Vas =

- Location in Slovenia
- Coordinates: 45°41′41.45″N 15°19′41″E
- Country: Slovenia
- Traditional region: White Carniola
- Statistical region: Southeast Slovenia
- Municipality: Metlika

Area
  - Total: 2.27 km^{2} (0.88 sq mi)
- Elevation: 407.1 m (1,336 ft)

Population (2002)
  - Total: 99
- Postal code: 8331

Bojanja Vas (pronounced [bɔˈjaːnja ˈʋaːs]; Slovene: Bojanja vas, German: Bojansdorf) is a village in the Municipality of Metlika in the White Carniola area of southeastern Slovenia, next to the border with Croatia. The entire area is part of the traditional region of Lower Carniola and is now included in the Southeast Slovenia Statistical Region.

== Geography ==
Bojanja Vas is a clustered village on a slope on heavily karstified terrain. There are small fields on poor-quality soil to the south, vineyards to the east and south, and woods to the north and west. A water main was connected from the Jamnik Ridge northeast of the village in 1965, with the main water reservoir located west of the village, near Glavica Hill (493 m). Nearby caves include Kip Cave (Slovene: Kipova jama), Šulnovka Cave, Kadiš Cave (Kadiševa jama), Role Cave, and Tončik Cave (Tončikova jama). The Pečenjevka Chasm is located northeast of the village, where there is a 50 m waterfall from Jamnik Creek during heavy rains.

== Name ==
Bojanja Vas was attested in written sources as Woyansdorff in 1423 and Wansdorf in 1498, among other spellings. The name Bojanja vas is derived from the Slavic hypocorism Bojanъ, from the personal name Bojeslavъ (literally, 'he who is renowned for fighting'). The settlement name literally means 'Bojanъ's village'. Locally, the village is known as Bojanci.

== History ==
In the past, a market was held next to the village church, from which a judge in Metlika collected fees. In 1492 the market was moved to Metlika due to the danger of Ottoman attacks. In 1756 there were six farms in the village belonging to the Dominion of Krupa. A community cellar is preserved from 1873. During the Second World War, Italian forces burned all but four of the houses in the village on 7 August 1942. After the Italian surrender, Partisan forces concentrated in the village. In 1944 and 1945, a Partisan checkpoint for the Žumberak field hospitals was active in Bojanja Vas.

=== Mass grave ===
Bojanja Vas is the site of a mass grave associated with the Second World War. The Šulnovka Mass Grave (Slovene: Grobišče Šulnovka) is located in a shaft in the woods 500 m east of the village. It contains the remains of unidentified civilians.

== Church ==
The local church is dedicated to Saint Margaret and belongs to the Parish of Radovica. It was built in the 18th century. It is a simple structure with a rectangular nave. The interior of the church and the altar furnishings are in the Baroque style.
