= Želebej =

- Location in Slovenia
- Coordinates: 45°38′52.6″N 15°21′53.03″E
- Country: Slovenia
- Traditional region: White Carniola
- Statistical region: Southeast Slovenia
- Municipality: Metlika

Area
  - Total: 0.89 km^{2} (0.34 sq mi)
- Elevation: 153.3 m (503 ft)

Population (2002)
  - Total: 52
- Postal code: 8330

Želebej (pronounced [ʒɛlɛˈbɛi̯] or [ˈʒeːlɛbɛi̯]) is a settlement on the left bank of the Kolpa River east of the town of Metlika in the White Carniola area of southeastern Slovenia. The area is part of the traditional region of Lower Carniola and is now included in the Southeast Slovenia Statistical Region.
