= Primostek =

- Location in Slovenia
- Coordinates: 45°37′40.13″N 15°17′40″E
- Country: Slovenia
- Traditional region: White Carniola
- Statistical region: Southeast Slovenia
- Municipality: Metlika

Area
  - Total: 1.59 km^{2} (0.61 sq mi)
- Elevation: 144.4 m (474 ft)

Population (2002)
  - Total: 130
- Postal code: 8332

Primostek (pronounced [ˈpɾiːmɔstək]) is a village in the Municipality of Metlika in the White Carniola area of southeastern Slovenia. It lies on the right bank of the Lahinja River, close to its confluence with the Kolpa River, next to the border with Croatia. The entire area is part of the traditional region of Lower Carniola and is now included in the Southeast Slovenia Statistical Region.
