= Grabrovec, Metlika =

Grabrovec
- Location in Slovenia
- Coordinates: 45°40′49.54″N 15°18′13.35″E
- Country: Slovenia
- Traditional region: White Carniola
- Statistical region: Southeast Slovenia
- Municipality: Metlika

Area
  - Total: 3.83 km^{2} (1.48 sq mi)
- Elevation: 321.8 m (1,056 ft)

Population (2002)
  - Total: 147
- Postal code: 8330

Grabrovec (pronounced [ˈɡɾaːbɾɔʋəts]; German: Grabrouz) is a settlement in the Municipality of Metlika in the White Carniola area of southeastern Slovenia. The entire area is part of the traditional region of Lower Carniola and is now included in the Southeast Slovenia Statistical Region.

The local church, built in the hamlet of Berčice in the southern part of the settlement, is dedicated to Saint Urban and belongs to the Parish of Metlika. It was built in the 17th century.
