= Rosalnice =

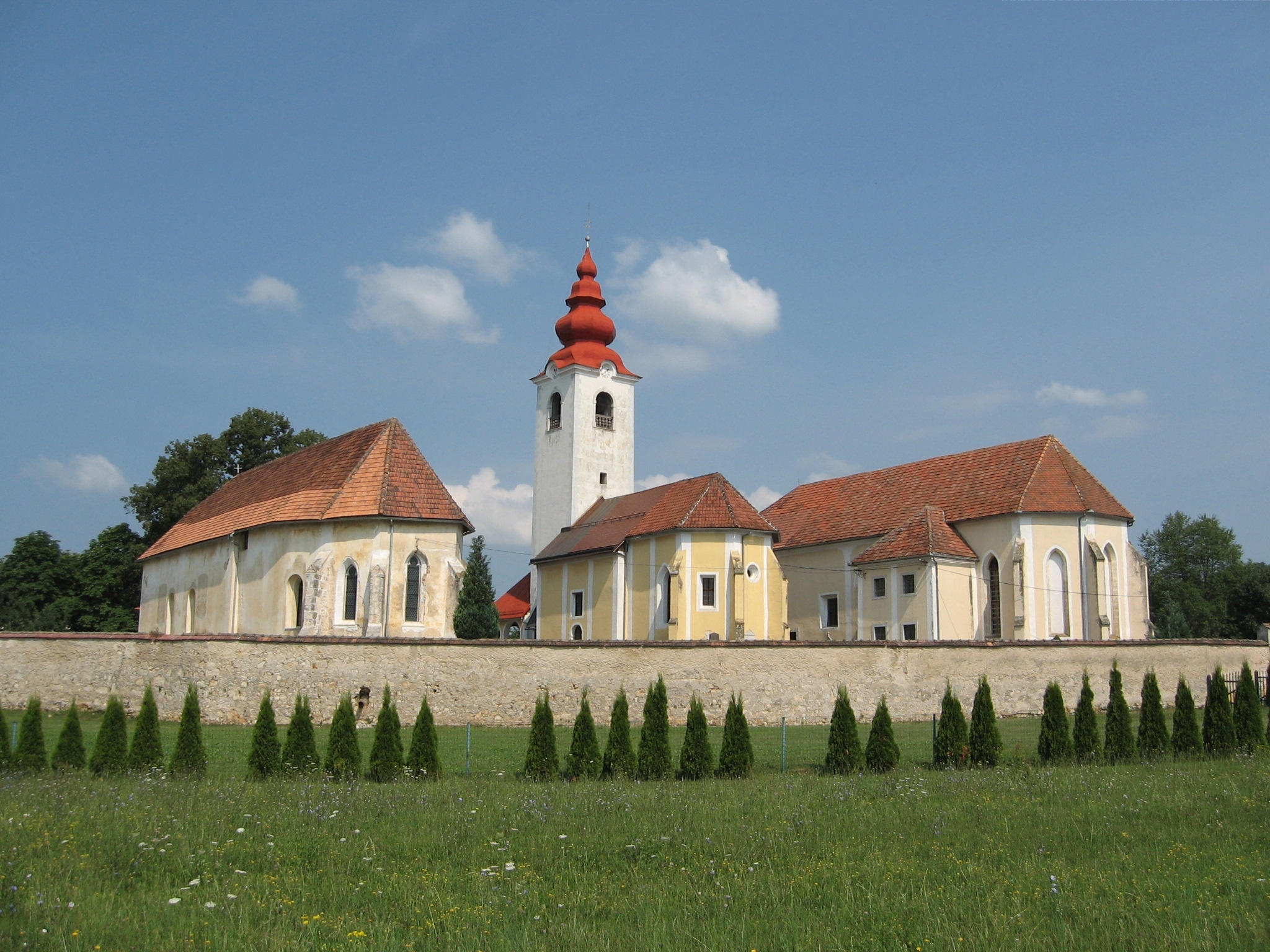

- Location in Slovenia
- Coordinates: 45°39′6.81″N 15°20′22.59″E
- Country: Slovenia
- Traditional region: White Carniola
- Statistical region: Southeast Slovenia
- Municipality: Metlika

Area
  - Total: 1.73 km^{2} (0.67 sq mi)
- Elevation: 151.2 m (496 ft)

Population (2002)
  - Total: 365
- Postal code: 8330

Rosalnice (pronounced [ɾɔˈsaːlnitsɛ] or [ɾɔˈsaːu̯nitsɛ]; German: Rosalnitz) is a village on the left bank of the Kolpa River, east of the town of Metlika in the White Carniola area of southeastern Slovenia, on the border with Croatia. The railway line from Novo Mesto to Karlovac runs through the settlement before it crosses the Kolpa River into Croatia. The entire area is part of the traditional region of Lower Carniola and is now included in the Southeast Slovenia Statistical Region.

== Name ==
Rosalnice was attested in historical sources as Rosendorf in 1490 (and as Rosaniz and Rasaniz in 1610). The origin of the name is uncertain. It may be derived from *rosále 'Pentecost', or less likely from Latin rosalia 'rose garden'.

== History ==
Archaeological finds show that the area has been settled since Roman times. An ancient burial ground was partly destroyed when local houses were being built, but 20 graves were properly excavated.

== Pilgrimage churches ==
The village is best known for its three pilgrimage churches on the northeastern edge of the settlement. Unusually, the three churches are built within a single walled enclosure. The northernmost church is dedicated to Our Lady of Sorrows. It was built in around 1383 and its nave was vaulted in the late 17th century. The middle church is called Ecce Homo and was built in the early 16th century. It was restyled in the Baroque in the 17th and 18th centuries. The third church is dedicated to Our Lady of Lourdes and has a Late Romanesque nave with a 15th-century Gothic sanctuary, but was extensively rebuilt in the following centuries. On the exterior wall of the sanctuary some wall paintings dating to the 16th century, depicting the crucifixion and Saint Christopher, are preserved. The churches are collectively known as the Three Parishes (Slovene: Tri fare), but are not parish churches per se and belong to the Parish of Metlika.

The early history of the development of the complex is not well documented in written sources, so numerous theories have arisen as to the origins of the three churches. Based on Valvasor's account as well as other sources, some authors have suggested the site was established by the Knights Templar in the late 12th century when they were granted the parish of Črnomelj with all its filial churches. Rosalnice as a village (Rosendorf) was first mentioned in written sources dating to 1490, but a church on the site is mentioned in a charter issued by the Patriarch of Aquileia dating to 1228. It is likely the Rosalnice church was the seat of one of the early parishes in White Carniola. Others suggest that the churches were founded in the early 13th century, when the Counts of Višnja Gora or Andechs annexed White Carniola. Another theory is that they were founded before or after the foundation of the Bishopric of Zagreb in 1093, which laid claim to jurisdiction over this territory. In any case only one church is mentioned in early documents. Continuous Ottoman raids in the 15th century led to the relocation of the parish to the town of Metlika. Rosalnice was then established as a monastic complex. Refugee Franciscan friars from Bosnia fled here in the early 15th century and remained here until their retreat to Novo Mesto in 1469. After this the complex developed as an important pilgrimage centre and the central church was built. Pilgrimages were at their height in the 18th and 19th centuries.

== Other features ==
Three concrete bunkers, dating to the Second World War, and remnants of the old border line between the Kingdom of Italy and the Independent State of Croatia between 1941 and 1943 are preserved in a field east of the village. Yugoslavia was restored and the border was moved after the war.
