= Boldraž =

- Location in Slovenia
- Coordinates: 45°40′31.37″N 15°20′30.54″E
- Country: Slovenia
- Traditional region: White Carniola
- Statistical region: Southeast Slovenia
- Municipality: Metlika

Area
  - Total: 2.33 km^{2} (0.90 sq mi)
- Elevation: 250.2 m (821 ft)

Population (2002)
  - Total: 155
- Postal code: 8330

Boldraž (pronounced [ˈboːldɾaʃ]) is a small settlement north of the town of Metlika in the White Carniola area of southeastern Slovenia. The entire area is part of the traditional region of Lower Carniola and is now included in the Southeast Slovenia Statistical Region.

== Name ==
Boldraž was attested in written sources as Wodidraß in 1498.

== Cultural heritage ==
There is a small chapel in the village. It was built in the late 18th century.

== Notable people ==
- Anton Mavretič (1934–2019), electrical engineer
