= Radoviči =

- Location in Slovenia
- Coordinates: 45°38′53.08″N 15°21′5.46″E
- Country: Slovenia
- Traditional region: White Carniola
- Statistical region: Southeast Slovenia
- Municipality: Metlika

Area
  - Total: 1.15 km^{2} (0.44 sq mi)
- Elevation: 141 m (463 ft)

Population (2002)
  - Total: 97
- Postal code: 8330

Radoviči (pronounced [ˈɾaːdɔʋitʃi]; German: Radowitsch) is a settlement on the left bank of the Kolpa River, east of the town of Metlika in the White Carniola area of southeastern Slovenia. The entire area is part of the traditional region of Lower Carniola and is now included in the Southeast Slovenia Statistical Region.

There is a small chapel with a belfry in the village. It is dedicated to Our Lady of Mount Carmel and was built in the late 19th century.
