= Bereča Vas =

- Location in Slovenia
- Coordinates: 45°40′48.51″N 15°16′30.75″E
- Country: Slovenia
- Traditional region: White Carniola
- Statistical region: Southeast Slovenia
- Municipality: Metlika

Area
  - Total: 1.4 km^{2} (0.54 sq mi)
- Elevation: 295.7 m (970 ft)

Population (2002)
  - Total: 155
- Postal code: 8331

Bereča Vas (pronounced [bɛˈɾeːtʃa ˈʋaːs]; Slovene: Bereča vas, German: Beretschendorf) is a settlement in the Municipality of Metlika in the White Carniola area of southeastern Slovenia. The entire area is part of the traditional region of Lower Carniola and is now included in the Southeast Slovenia Statistical Region.

The local church is dedicated to Saint James and belongs to the Parish of Suhor. It was built in the 17th century.
