= Gradac, Metlika =

Gradac
- Location in Slovenia
- Coordinates: 45°36′48.41″N 15°14′37.87″E
- Country: Slovenia
- Traditional region: White Carniola
- Statistical region: Southeast Slovenia
- Municipality: Metlika

Area
  - Total: 5.97 km^{2} (2.31 sq mi)
- Elevation: 150 m (490 ft)

Population (2002)
  - Total: 419
- Postal code: 8332

Gradac (pronounced [ˈɡɾaːdats]; German: Gradaz) is a village in the Municipality of Metlika in the White Carniola area of southeastern Slovenia, close to the border with Croatia on the Lahinja River. It is now included in the Southeast Slovenia Statistical Region. The village is best known for well-preserved Gradac Castle.

== Community ==
Gradac has a railway station, a post office, bars and cafes, and a small industrial park. Traditionally many craftspeople (stonemasons, locksmiths, wainwrights, wheelwrights, and potters) and farmers lived in the village.

It also has an outdoor sports field for handball, basketball, and soccer. It is located next to the new fire station, which was built in the 1980s. A small airport, mainly for gliders and light aircraft, is located in nearby Prilozje. This airfield was originally built in World War II in order to allow allied aircraft to land to evacuate wounded soldiers and civilians and to deliver other humanitarian aid such as medicine.

== History ==
=== Medieval history ===
==== Gradac Castle ====
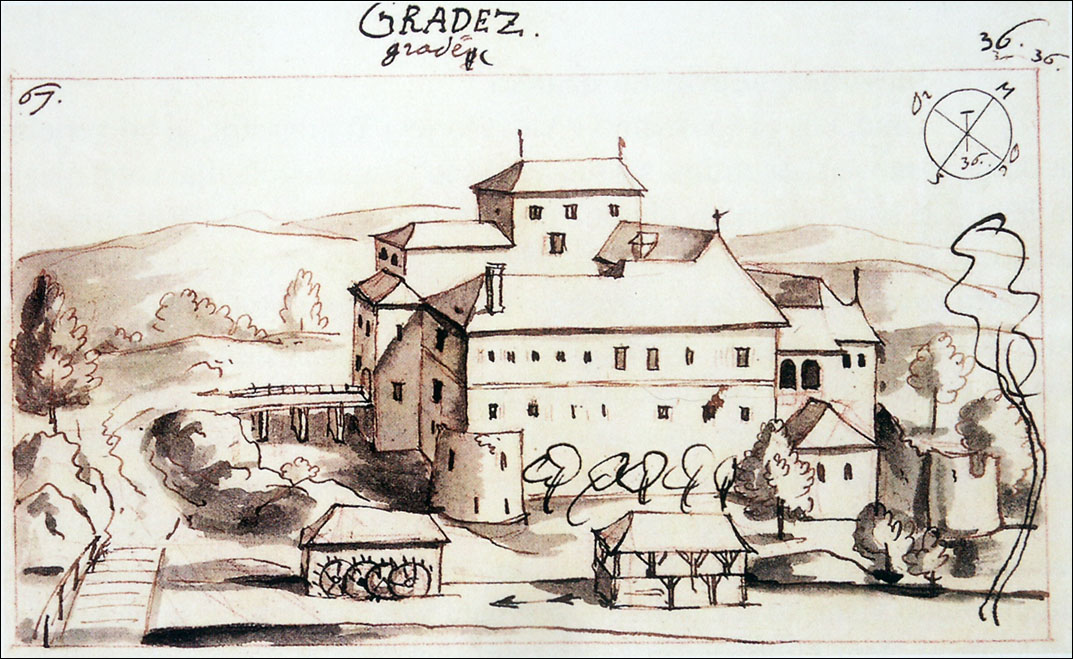
Gradac Castle in the 17th century

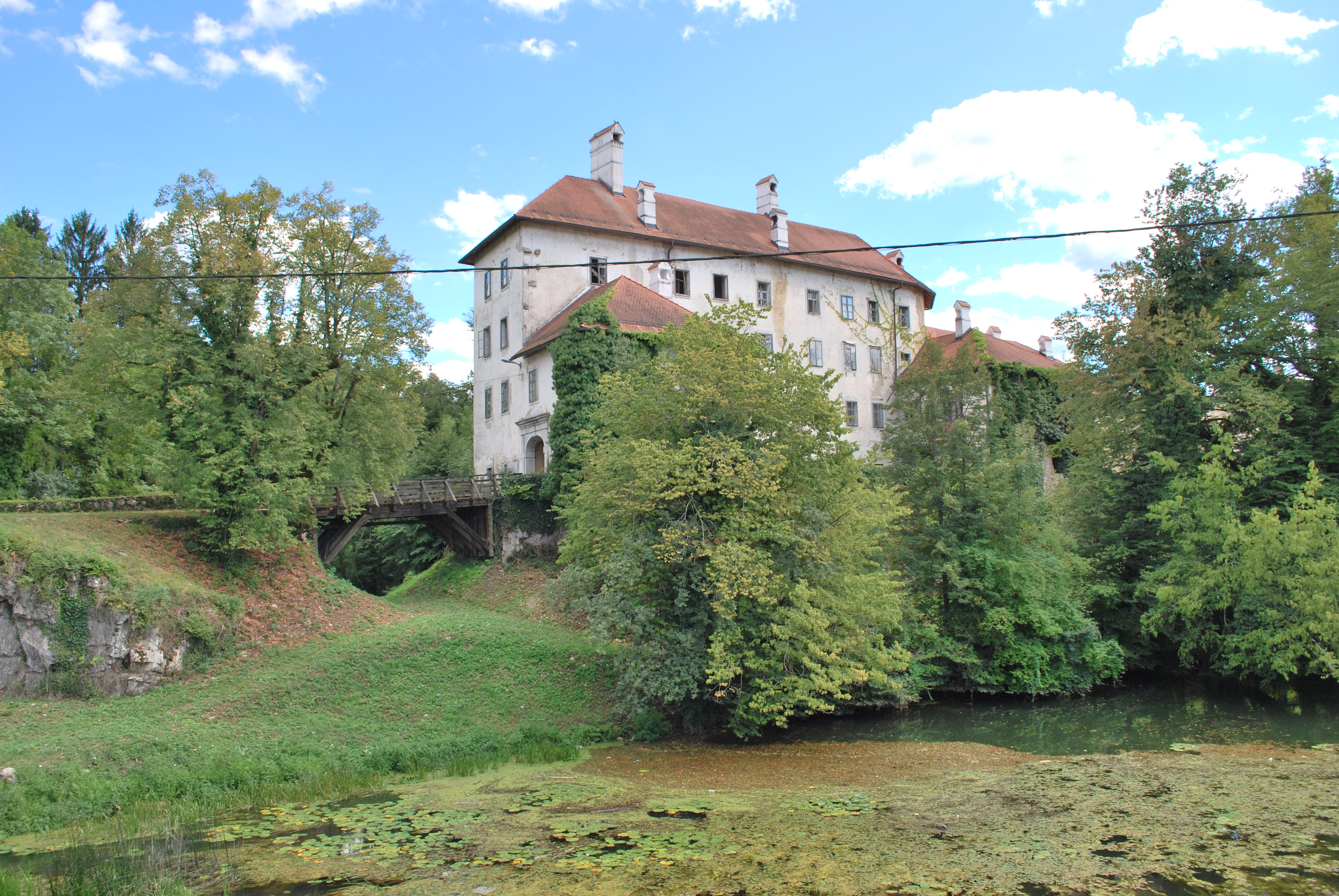
Gradac Castle in 2012

Gradac Castle is castle with a moat and located on a curve of the Lahinja River. It has been declared a national cultural heritage landmark of Slovenia. Gradac Castle was first mentioned in written documents in 1228.

The castle island is mostly covered by a large Renaissance park that is neglected and overgrown. It includes a garden, remnants of an alley, and the mausoleum of the last owner (named Gusič), who was a businessman from Zagreb. There are plans to restore the castle and renew the park. The Municipality of Metlika repaired the roof of the castle to prevent further decay at end of the 1990s. However, talks with potential investors from Italy and Ireland have been unsuccessful.

Public discussion about the future of the castle intensified again in 2006. This happened when the Slovenian regional development program for southeast Slovenia was discussed and right before the regional elections.

Since the summer of 2006, locals have begun a relatively successful campaign to inform the Slovenian public about the neglected castle and the potential for it to serve as a hotel in order to develop tourism in this region. Following local initiatives, the Metlika municipal authorities and the Ministry of Culture in Ljubljana became more actively involved. There are plans to set up a hotel in the castle.

In March 2009, MP Renata Brunskole, who was also mayor of Metlika, asked Minister of Culture Majda Širca about government plans for the castle. Although the minister's response was not encouraging, the ministry of internal affairs included the castle in the project Invest in Slovene Tourism.

=== World War II ===
On 18 June 1944, the Slovenian Red Cross was founded in Gradac. A military school for Partisan officers was located in the castle during World War II between 1944 and 1945.

Gradac was bombed on the afternoon of 30 January 1945. Apparently German intelligence found out that a large number of wounded waited in the village for evacuation through the nearby Partisan airports of Otok or Krasinec. At 4 pm on that day, six or seven German aircraft dropped bombs on the center of Gradac. Five people were killed and eight wounded. The new bridge over the Lahinja, two buildings, and the saw were completely destroyed. Fourteen other houses were heavily damaged.

== Other historical buildings ==
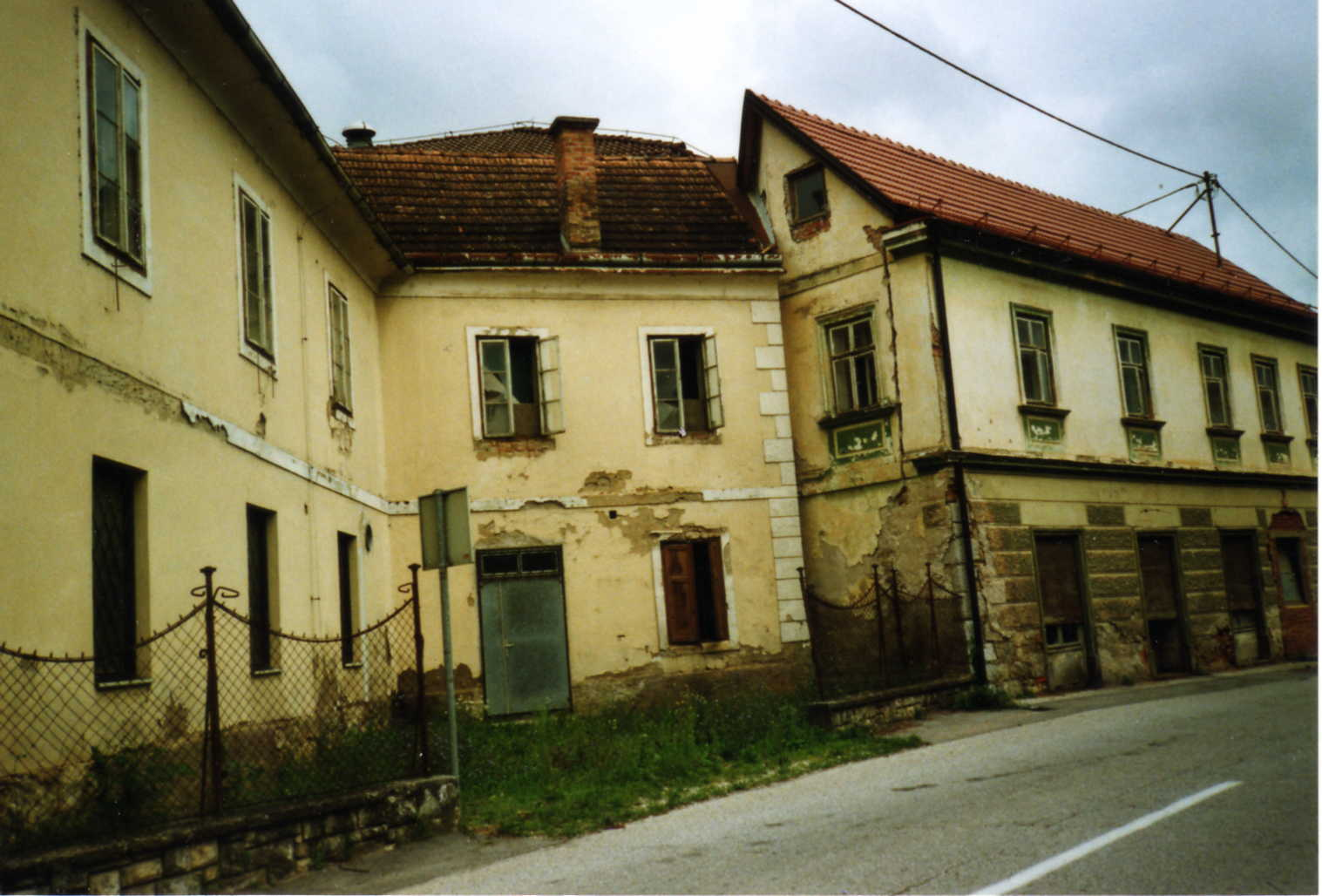
Hanzel House

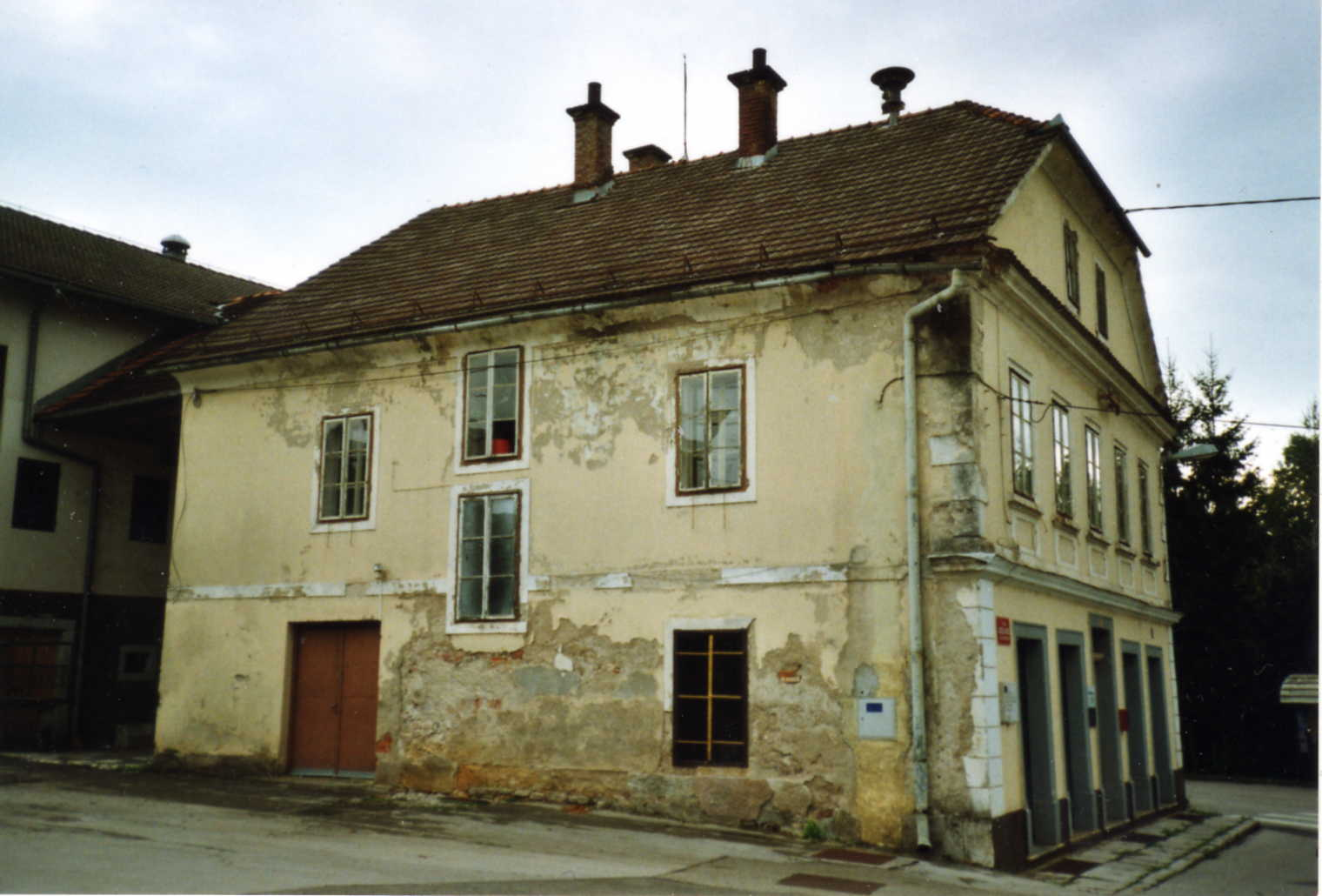
Macele (Mazelle) House

The old fire station is located right at the intersection of the roads to Črnomelj and Semič. The new fire station is located at the end of the village on the road to Črnomelj. Right there are also a soccer field and a field for handball and basketball. An old scale for weighing livestock can also be seen near the old fire station. A number of buildings have been listed as cultural heritage monuments by the Slovenian Ministry of Culture. These are:

- The Baricin House (Gradac no. 86). The house has a U-shaped floor plan.
- The Hanzel House (Gradac no. 54). The old staircase was decorated with a large painting of traditional White Carniolan dress. This building is currently being refurbished.
- The Macele (or Mazelle) House (Gradac no. 55). Until the 1980s, the local post office was located in this building. The Slovenian Red Cross was established there in 1944. The building itself dates to 1889.
- The Grof Farm

The community has built a wastewater treatment facility that is now fully operational. All of the houses are now connected to the sewer network.
