= Božakovo =

- Location in Slovenia
- Coordinates: 45°38′45.05″N 15°22′25.77″E
- Country: Slovenia
- Traditional region: White Carniola
- Statistical region: Southeast Slovenia
- Municipality: Metlika

Area
  - Total: 2.35 km^{2} (0.91 sq mi)
- Elevation: 176.1 m (578 ft)

Population (2002)
  - Total: 119
- Postal code: 8330

Božakovo (pronounced [bɔˈʒaːkɔʋɔ]; in older sources also Božjakovo, German: Boschakowo or Boschiakou) is a village on the left bank of the Kolpa River in the Municipality of Metlika in the White Carniola area of southeastern Slovenia. The entire area is part of the traditional region of Lower Carniola and is now included in the Southeast Slovenia Statistical Region.

== Name ==
Božakovo was attested in written sources as ecclesia … Marie Magdalene in 1334 and Wosiackh in 1490.

== Church ==
The local church is dedicated to Mary Magdalene and belongs to the Parish of Metlika. It was built in the 18th century.
