= Krasinec =

- Location in Slovenia
- Coordinates: 45°35′18.06″N 15°16′44.81″E
- Country: Slovenia
- Traditional region: White Carniola
- Statistical region: Southeast Slovenia
- Municipality: Metlika

Area
  - Total: 4.77 km^{2} (1.84 sq mi)
- Elevation: 145.4 m (477 ft)

Population (2002)
  - Total: 215
- Postal code: 8332

Krasinec (pronounced [kɾaˈsiːnəts]; German: Krassinz) is a settlement on the left bank of the Kolpa River in the Municipality of Metlika in the White Carniola area of southeastern Slovenia, right on the border with Croatia. The area is part of the traditional region of Lower Carniola and is now included in the Southeast Slovenia Statistical Region.

== History ==
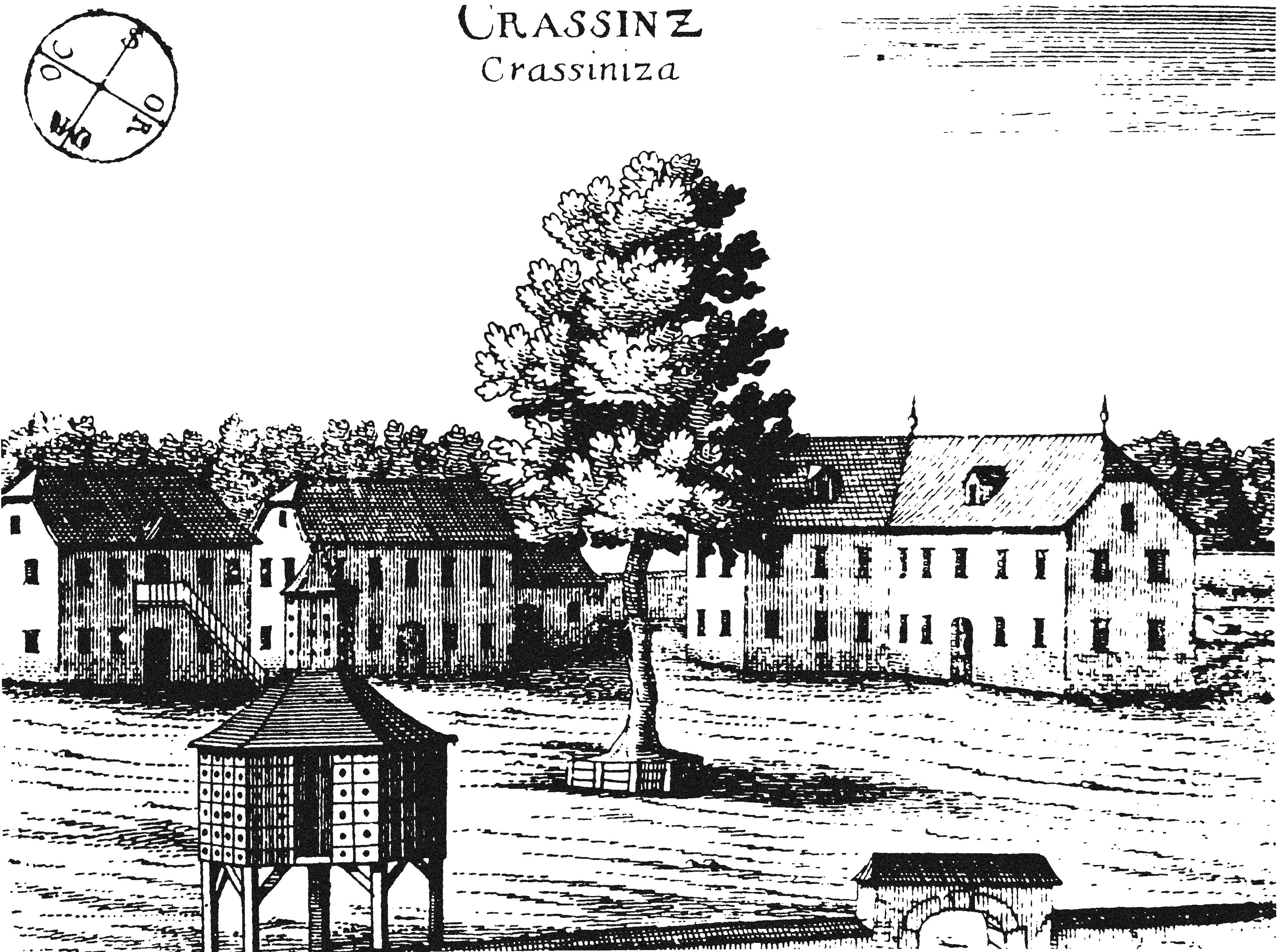
Krasinec Manor

Probable Roman finds have been discovered in the area, testifying to its early settlement. According to Johann Weikhard von Valvasor, the nobleman Ivan Adam Burgstall built a manor near the village, and in 1666 also established a manor farm for raising livestock. Between the manor house and the farm there was also a pond and dovecote. By the 18th century, the manor owned three farms in the village and was part of the dominion of Pobrežje. No trace remains of the manor today. In 1899 a historical vineyard cottage in the village was destroyed by fire. During the Second World War, a Partisan airfield was located 1 kilometer (0.62 mi) from the village. It was used by American and British aircraft from fall 1944 to April 1945 to supply war material to the Partisan forces and to evacuate wounded soldiers and British paratroopers.

== Church ==
The local church is dedicated to Saint Anthony the Hermit and belongs to the Parish of Podzemelj. It was built in the 18th century.
