= Dolnji Suhor pri Metliki =

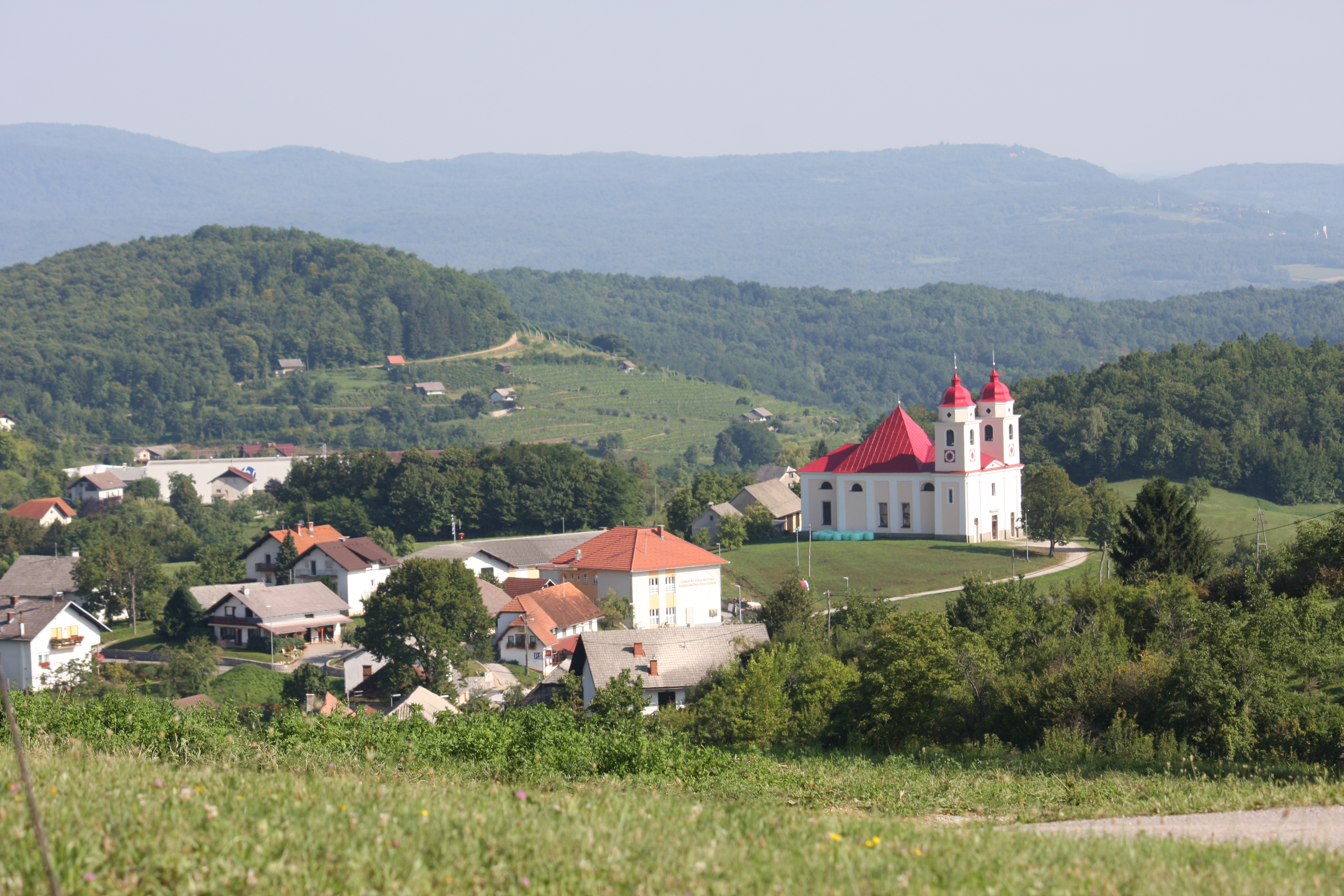

- Location in Slovenia
- Coordinates: 45°41′23.16″N 15°16′36.47″E
- Country: Slovenia
- Traditional region: White Carniola
- Statistical region: Southeast Slovenia
- Municipality: Metlika

Area
  - Total: 0.43 km^{2} (0.17 sq mi)
- Elevation: 342.1 m (1,122 ft)

Population (2002)
  - Total: 77
- Postal code: 8331

Dolnji Suhor pri Metliki (pronounced [ˈdoːlnji ˈsuːxɔɾ pɾi mɛˈtliːki]; German: Untersuchor bei Möttling) is a settlement in the Municipality of Metlika in the White Carniola area of southeastern Slovenia. The area is part of the traditional region of Lower Carniola and is now included in the Southeast Slovenia Statistical Region.

== Name ==
The name of the settlement was changed from Dolnji Suhor to Dolnji Suhor pri Metliki in 1953. The name literally means 'lower Suhor near Metlike', distinguishing the settlement from neighboring Gornji Suhor pri Metliki (literally, 'upper Suhor near Metlike'). The settlement was attested in written sources in 1477 as Suchar (and as Dolnÿ Zwhor in 1593, and Vnter Süehar in 1610). The name Suhor is derived from the adjective suh 'dry'. This most likely refers to a dry creek rather than reference to a hypocorism. The settlement was known as Untersuchor bei Möttling in German in the past.

== History ==
A school was established in 1859, and a schoolhouse was built in 1875. The settlement was heavily affected by the Second World War because of its strategic position; after the Italian offensive in the Gorjanci Mountains, military units were set up in the school and rectory on 16 November 1942. Partisan units burned the schoolhouse and rectory during an attack on 26 November 1942. Italian artillery from Metlika destroyed two houses and two barns. After the Armistice of Cassibile on 3 September 1943, the Partisans' regional committee was transferred from Gornji Suhor pri Metliki to Dolnji Suhor pri Metliki, where it remained until the German advance of 21 October 1943. A Partisan telephone switchboard operated in the village from 1943 to 1945, maintaining contact with communist insurgents in Croatia and with the field hospitals in the Gorjanci Mountains. The Italian Fontanot partisan unit (Italian: Brigada Fratelli Fontanot) was established in the village on 17 December 1944. Water mains were installed in the settlement in 1961.

=== Mass grave ===
Dolnji Suhor pri Metliki is the site of a mass grave from the Second World War. The Zakutka Mass Grave (Slovene: Grobišče Zakutka) is located among the vineyards east of Gornji Suhor pri Metliki. It contained the remains of the parish priest Rajner Erklavec (1893–1944) and three other Slovene civilians, including one woman, that were murdered in November 1944 by the Yugoslav secret police (OZNA). The remains have been exhumed and reburied.

== Church ==
The local parish church, built on the edge of the settlement on territory that actually belongs to the neighbouring village of Bereča Vas, is dedicated to Saint Joseph and belongs to the Roman Catholic Diocese of Novo Mesto. It was built between 1855 and 1858 in the site of an older structure. Its design and ornamentation reflect a late Baroque style, and the interior was painted by Jurij Tavčar (1820–1892) from Idrija. Dolnji Suhor pri Metliki was elevated to a parish in 1854.
