= Prilozje =

- Location in Slovenia
- Coordinates: 45°35′31.1″N 15°16′8.89″E
- Country: Slovenia
- Traditional region: White Carniola
- Statistical region: Southeast Slovenia
- Municipality: Metlika

Area
  - Total: 0.24 km^{2} (0.093 sq mi)
- Elevation: 158.6 m (520 ft)

Population (2002)
  - Total: 29
- Postal code: 8332

Prilozje (pronounced [pɾiˈloːzjɛ]) is a small settlement in the Municipality of Metlika in the White Carniola area of southeastern Slovenia. The area is part of the traditional region of Lower Carniola and is now included in the Southeast Slovenia Statistical Region.

A small airfield, mainly for gliders and light aircraft, is located west of the village.
