= Drašiči =

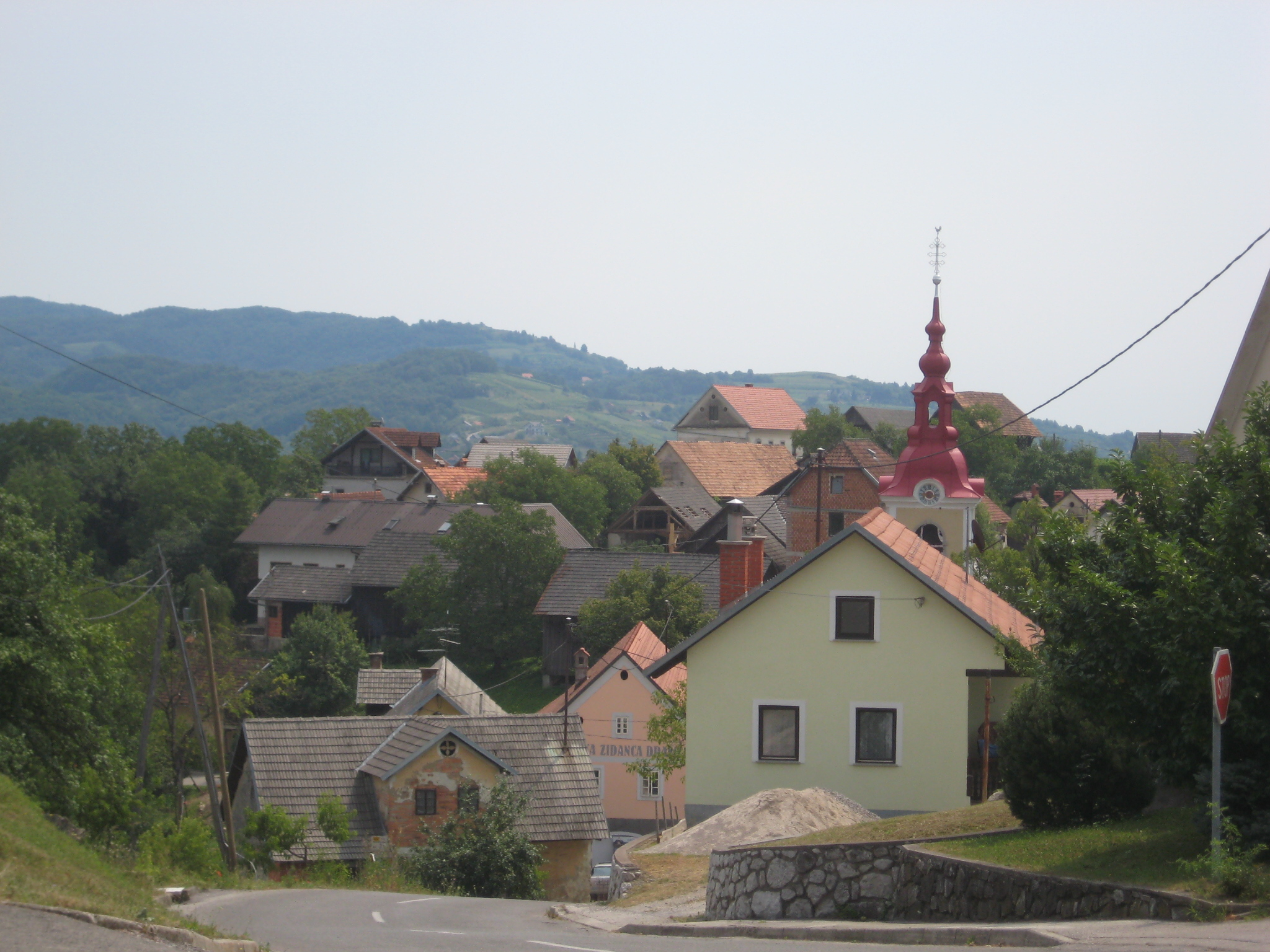

- Location in Slovenia
- Coordinates: 45°40′9.7″N 15°21′53.07″E
- Country: Slovenia
- Traditional region: White Carniola
- Statistical region: Southeast Slovenia
- Municipality: Metlika

Area
  - Total: 4.73 km^{2} (1.83 sq mi)
- Elevation: 254 m (833 ft)

Population (2002)
  - Total: 206
- Postal code: 8330

Drašiči (pronounced [ˈdɾaːʃitʃi]; German: Draschitz) is a village in the Municipality of Metlika in the White Carniola area of southeastern Slovenia, next to the border with Croatia. The entire area is part of the traditional region of Lower Carniola and is now included in the Southeast Slovenia Statistical Region.

The local church is dedicated to Saint Peter and belongs to the Parish of Metlika. It is a late Baroque church built in 1773.

In 1934, an Eneolithic settlement was excavated in the Stari Grad area of the settlement.
