= Radovica =

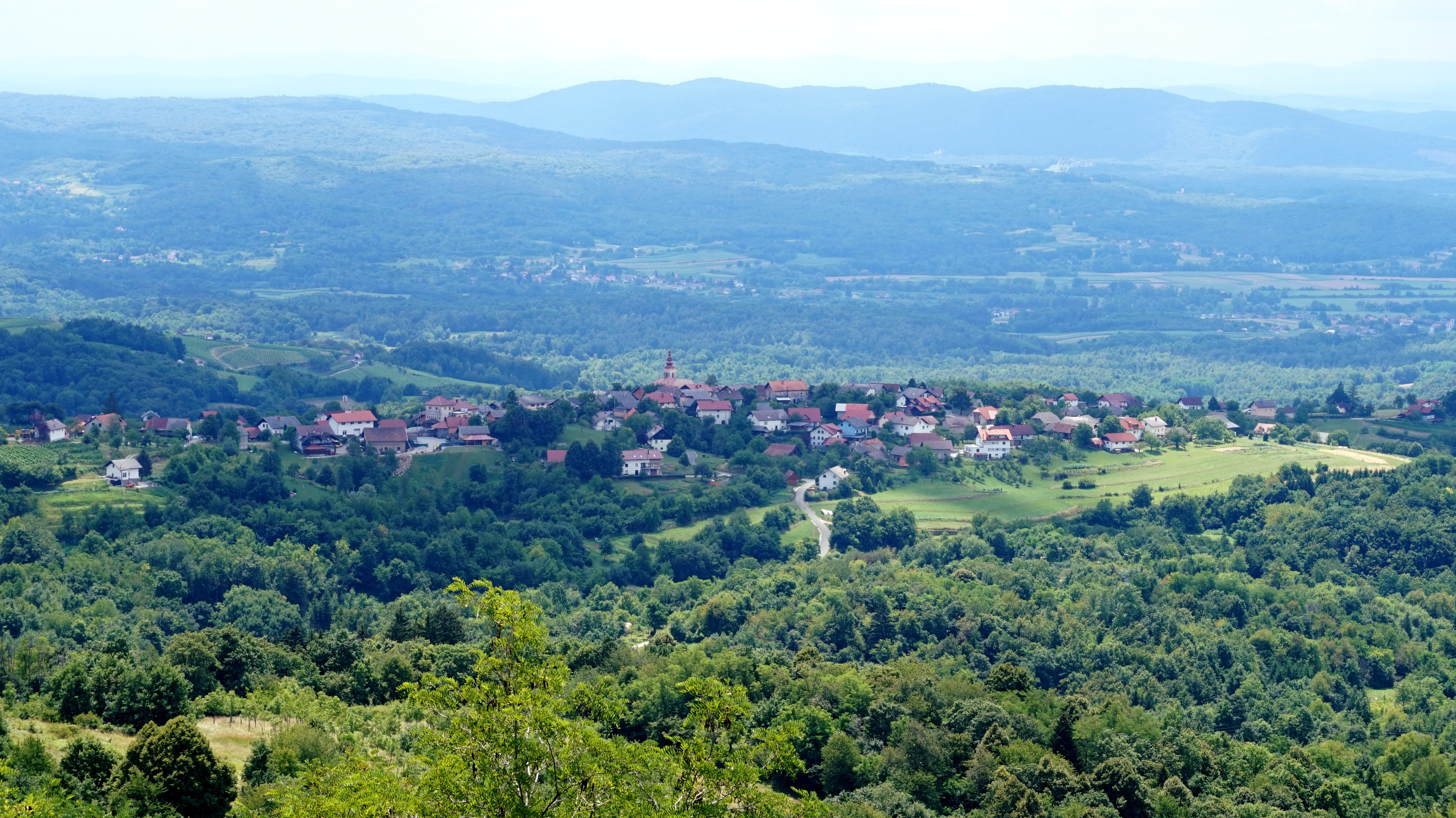

- Location in Slovenia
- Coordinates: 45°41′15.96″N 15°20′56.65″E
- Country: Slovenia
- Traditional region: White Carniola
- Statistical region: Southeast Slovenia
- Municipality: Metlika

Area
  - Total: 2.93 km^{2} (1.13 sq mi)
- Elevation: 384.3 m (1,261 ft)

Population (2002)
  - Total: 248
- Postal code: 8330

Radovica (pronounced [ˈɾaːdɔʋitsa]; German: Radowitza) is a village in the Municipality of Metlika in the White Carniola area of southeastern Slovenia, next to the border with Croatia. The area is part of the traditional region of Lower Carniola and is now included in the Southeast Slovenia Statistical Region.

The local parish church is dedicated to the Assumption of Mary and belongs to the Roman Catholic Diocese of Novo Mesto. It was built in the second half of the 18th century on the site of a 14th-century church.
