= Podzemelj =

- Village
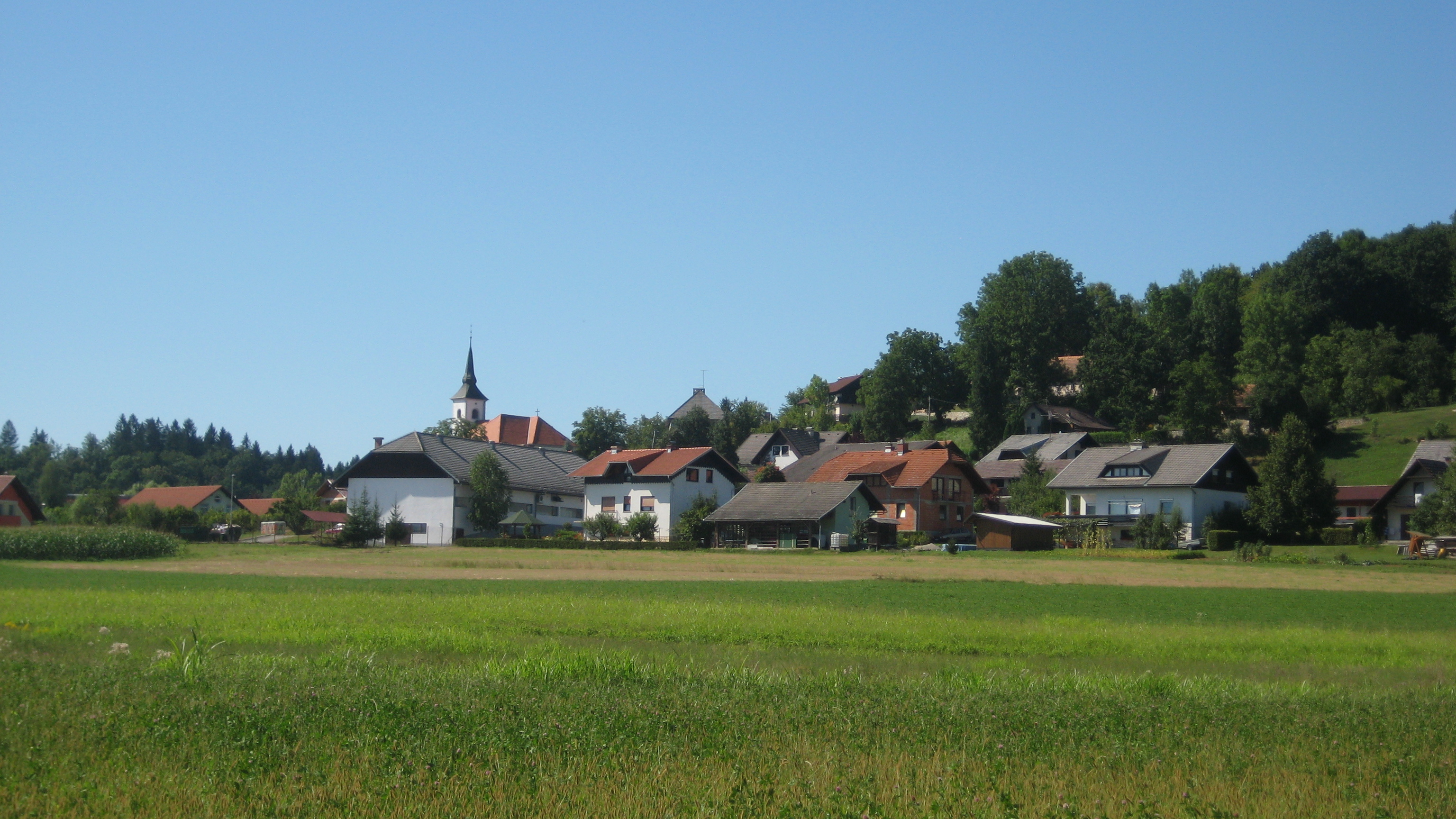

- Location in Slovenia
- Coordinates: 45°36′31.32″N 15°16′24.41″E
- Country: Slovenia
- Traditional region: White Carniola
- Statistical region: Southeast Slovenia
- Municipality: Metlika

Area
  - Total: 1.98 km^{2} (0.76 sq mi)
- Elevation: 155.3 m (510 ft)

Population (2002)
  - Total: 150
- Postal code: 8332

Podzemelj (pronounced [pɔdˈzeːməl]; German: Podsemel) is a village on the left bank of the Kolpa River in the Municipality of Metlika in the White Carniola area of southeastern Slovenia, next to the border with Croatia. The area is part of the traditional region of Lower Carniola and is now included in the Southeast Slovenia Statistical Region.

== Name ==
Podzemelj was mentioned in medieval written sources only with reference to the village church, as (ecclesia) sancti Martini 'Saint Martin's Church' in 1279 and as ecclesia sancti Martini prope Culpam 'Saint Martin's Church near the Kolpa River' in 1337. The name is derived from a combination of the preposition *podъ 'under, below' + *zemľa 'earth', referring to a ditch built for defense purposes (this is also the origin of neighboring Zemelj). The name therefore means '(settlement) below the trench'.

== History ==
A fortified prehistoric settlement, one of the largest in White Carniola, was located on Kučar Hill (222 m) above Podzemelj. It existed from the first millennium BC at least to the Roman era, and Roman inscriptions have been found at the site dedicated to the deity Silvanus. Excavations indicate that settlement may have lasted at the site until the Middle Ages. The inhabitants of the hill settlement buried their dead in mound graves at Podzemelj and elsewhere; the mound burial site at Podzemelj consists of approximately 30 burial mounds. Almost all of them were excavated before the First World War and the finds were transferred to the archaeological museum in Vienna.

In 1523 the village consisted of eight farms. A school was first established in Podzemelj in 1857. During the Second World War, an officer training school operated in the village in August 1944. From October 1944 to May 1945, the British military mission operated a radio transmitter in Podzemelj for aircraft using the field at Otok.

== Archaeology ==
In 2018, archaeologists unearthed fifteen graves at the Pezdirčeva Njiva site. The graves contained pottery and iron grave goods and dates back to the 4th and 3rd century B.C. In one of the graves they also found a bronze belt with a gold coin. The coin is a Celtic imitation of the Alexander the Great stater, depicting Nike and Athena, and dates back to the first half of the 3rd century BC. According to the archaeologists this was a very significant discovery. Such coins are very rare.

== Church ==
The local parish church is dedicated to Saint Martin and belongs to the Roman Catholic Diocese of Novo Mesto. It was first mentioned in written documents dating to 1279 and was extensively rebuilt in the Baroque style in the 18th century. The altar furnishings are Baroque and the main altar painting was created in 1892 by Franc Blaznik. The sculptures on the side altars are of Tyrolean origin, the Stations of the Cross are the work of Joseph von Fürich, and the chancel arch was painted by Simon Ogrin Jr. The church was made the seat of a parish before 1338.
