= Selce pri Špeharjih =

- Location in Slovenia
- Coordinates: 45°27′4.91″N 15°8′27.56″E
- Country: Slovenia
- Traditional region: White Carniola
- Statistical region: Southeast Slovenia
- Municipality: Črnomelj

Area
  - Total: 0.7 km^{2} (0.27 sq mi)

Population (2020)
  - Total: 2
  - Density: 2.9/km^{2} (7.4/sq mi)
- Postal code: 8340

Selce pri Špeharjih (pronounced [ˈseːu̯tsɛ pɾi ʃpɛˈxaːɾjix]) is a small village in the Municipality of Črnomelj in southeastern Slovenia. The village is part of the traditional region of White Carniola and is included in the Southeast Slovenia Statistical Region.

== History ==
Selce pri Špeharjih was annexed by neighboring Breg pri Sinjem Vrhu in 1952. In 2000 it was separated from Breg pri Sinjem Vrhu, restoring its status as a separate settlement.
