= Močile =

Močile may refer to:

- Močile, Slovenia, a village near Črnomelj
- Močile, Croatia, a village near Vrbovsko
