= Rim, Črnomelj =

Rim
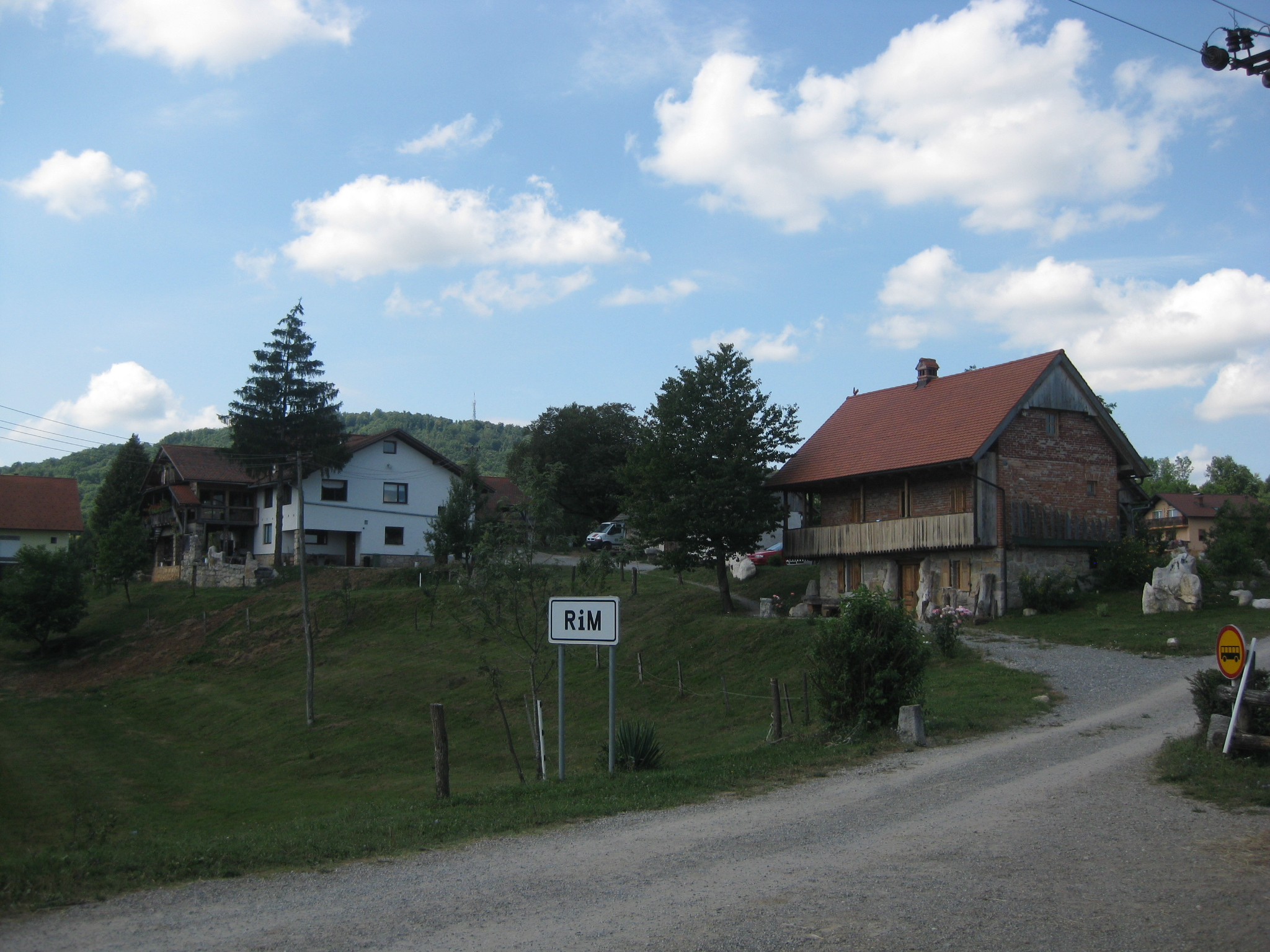

- Location in Slovenia
- Coordinates: 45°32′25.27″N 15°17′33.76″E
- Country: Slovenia
- Traditional region: White Carniola
- Statistical region: Southeast Slovenia
- Municipality: Črnomelj

Area
  - Total: 0.1 km^{2} (0.039 sq mi)

Population (2020)
  - Total: 19
  - Density: 190/km^{2} (490/sq mi)
- Postal code: 8340

Rim (pronounced [ˈɾiːm]) is a small village in the Municipality of Črnomelj in southeastern Slovenia. Until 2007, the area was part of the settlement of Jankoviči. The village is part of the traditional region of White Carniola and is included in the Southeast Slovenia Statistical Region.

== Name ==
The name Rim means 'Rome'. Rim was first settled in the 1870s, when Peter Kralj built a house at the site. Kralj had served as a member of the Papal guard under Pope Pius IX, and he was subsequently nicknamed Papež 'Pope'. Because the pope lives in Rome, the site where Kralj settled was given the name Rim as a joke.
