= Hrib, Črnomelj =

Village in southern Slovenia

Hrib
- Location in Slovenia
- Coordinates: 45°27′0.5″N 15°7′55.39″E
- Country: Slovenia
- Traditional region: White Carniola
- Statistical region: Southeast Slovenia
- Municipality: Črnomelj

Area
  - Total: 2.5 km^{2} (0.97 sq mi)

Population (2020)
  - Total: 30
  - Density: 12/km^{2} (31/sq mi)
- Postal code: 8340

Hrib (pronounced [ˈxɾiːp]) is a small village in the Municipality of Črnomelj in southeastern Slovenia. From 1952 until 2000, the area was part of the settlement of Breg pri Sinjem Vrhu. The village is part of the traditional region of White Carniola and is included in the Southeast Slovenia Statistical Region.
