= Dolenja Podgora =

- Location in Slovenia
- Coordinates: 45°31′51.24″N 15°4′25.41″E
- Country: Slovenia
- Traditional region: White Carniola
- Statistical region: Southeast Slovenia
- Municipality: Črnomelj

Area
  - Total: 5.68 km^{2} (2.19 sq mi)
- Elevation: 393.2 m (1,290 ft)

Population (2020)
  - Total: 7
  - Density: 1.2/km^{2} (3.2/sq mi)
- Postal code: 8342

Dolenja Podgora (pronounced [dɔˈleːnja pɔdˈɡɔːɾa]; German: Unterberg) is a settlement in the hills southwest of Črnomelj in the White Carniola area of southeastern Slovenia. The area is part of the traditional region of Lower Carniola and is now included in the Southeast Slovenia Statistical Region.

A site of an Eneolithic settlement with evidence of occupation also in Late Antiquity has been found in the Židovec area near the village.
