= Talčji Vrh =

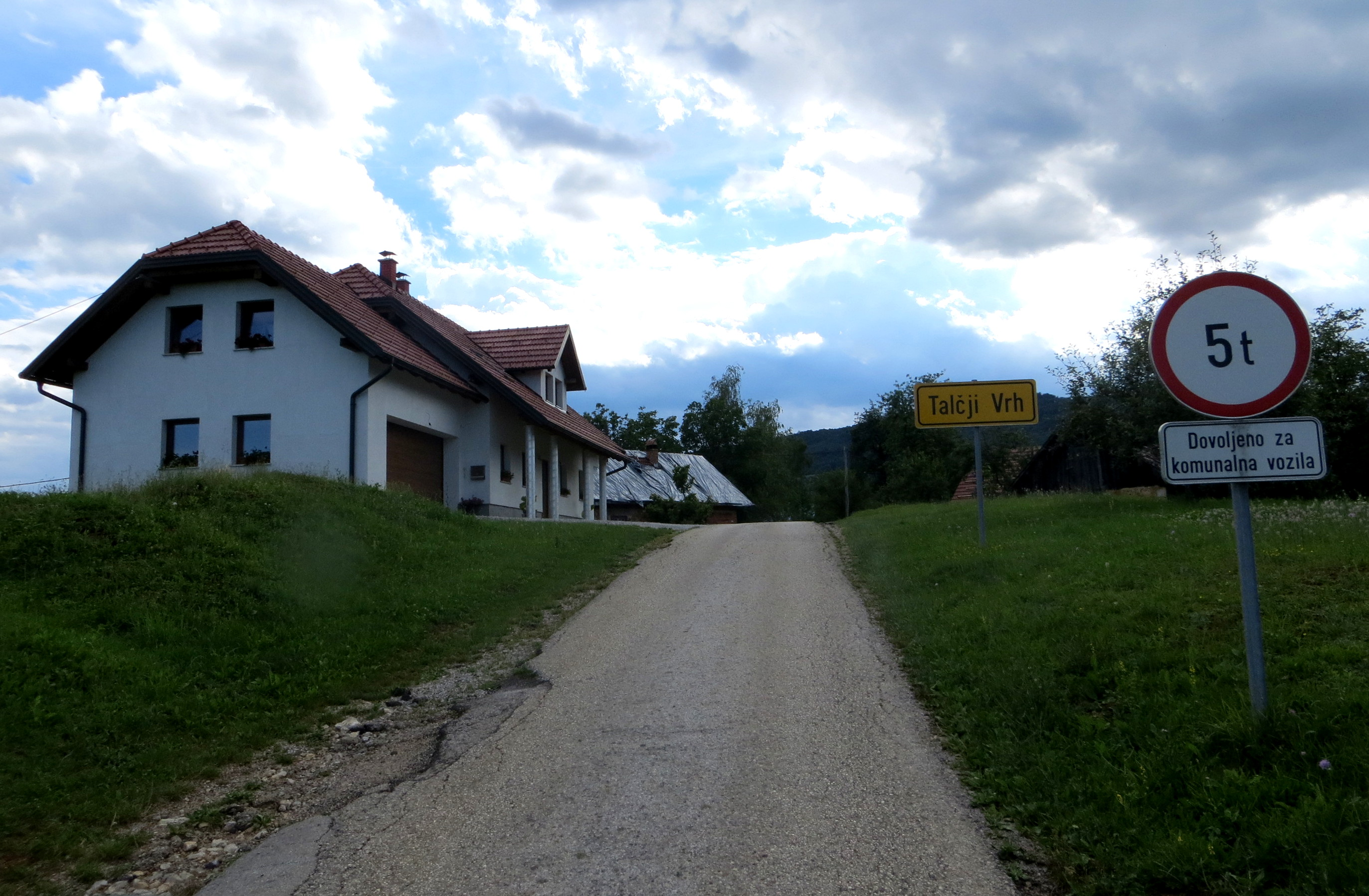

- Location in Slovenia
- Coordinates: 45°35′10.78″N 15°9′41.71″E
- Country: Slovenia
- Traditional region: White Carniola
- Statistical region: Southeast Slovenia
- Municipality: Črnomelj

Area
  - Total: 1.58 km^{2} (0.61 sq mi)
- Elevation: 177.3 m (582 ft)

Population (2020)
  - Total: 32
  - Density: 20/km^{2} (52/sq mi)
- Postal code: 8340

Talčji Vrh (pronounced [ˈtaːltʃji ˈʋəɾx]; in older sources also Telčji Vrh, German: Kälbersberg) is a settlement northwest of the town of Črnomelj in the White Carniola area of southeastern Slovenia. It is part of the traditional region of Lower Carniola and is now included in the Southeast Slovenia Statistical Region.
