= Brdarci =

- Location in Slovenia
- Coordinates: 45°31′26.72″N 15°11′55.17″E
- Country: Slovenia
- Traditional region: White Carniola
- Statistical region: Southeast Slovenia
- Municipality: Črnomelj

Area
  - Total: 1.88 km^{2} (0.73 sq mi)
- Elevation: 162.9 m (534 ft)

Population (2020)
  - Total: 44
  - Density: 23/km^{2} (61/sq mi)
- Postal code: 8343

Brdarci (pronounced [ˈbəɾdaɾtsi]; German: Berdarze) is a small settlement east of Dragatuš in the Municipality of Črnomelj in the White Carniola area of southeastern Slovenia. The area is part of the traditional region of Lower Carniola and is now included in the Southeast Slovenia Statistical Region.

== Name ==
Brdarci was attested in written sources as Wardarecz in 1463 and Wärarecz in 1464.
