= Fučkovci =

- Location in Slovenia
- Coordinates: 45°32′39.5″N 15°17′43.03″E
- Country: Slovenia
- Traditional region: White Carniola
- Statistical region: Southeast Slovenia
- Municipality: Črnomelj

Area
  - Total: 1.17 km^{2} (0.45 sq mi)
- Elevation: 176.8 m (580 ft)

Population (2020)
  - Total: 44
  - Density: 38/km^{2} (97/sq mi)
- Postal code: 8341

Fučkovci (pronounced [ˈfuːtʃkɔwtsi]) is a settlement on the terrace above the left bank of the Kolpa River in the Municipality of Črnomelj in the White Carniola area of southeastern Slovenia, next to the border with Croatia. The area is part of the traditional region of Lower Carniola and is now included in the Southeast Slovenia Statistical Region.

== Name ==
The settlement was first attested in written sources in 1490 as Futskowisch (and in 1674 as Fuschkhoutzy). Like the nearby Croatian settlement of Fučkovac in the Municipality of Bosiljevo, the name is derived from a Slavic personal name (cf. the Slovene surname Fučko). The plural name of the settlement thus literally means 'residents of Fučko's village'. The name Fučko itself could be derived from the verb fučkati 'to whistle', but is probably a hypocorism of the personal name Fuk (until recently also a Slovene surname), likely derived from the Old High German name Fucco.

== Cultural heritage ==
An archaeological field survey in 2002 revealed the existence of a prehistoric settlement in the area.
