= Obrh pri Dragatušu =

- Location in Slovenia
- Coordinates: 45°30′50.3″N 15°10′2.15″E
- Country: Slovenia
- Traditional region: White Carniola
- Statistical region: Southeast Slovenia
- Municipality: Črnomelj

Area
  - Total: 2.88 km^{2} (1.11 sq mi)
- Elevation: 158.6 m (520 ft)

Population (2020)
  - Total: 100
  - Density: 35/km^{2} (90/sq mi)
- Postal code: 8343

Obrh pri Dragatušu (pronounced [ˈoːbəɾx pɾi dɾaɡaˈtuːʃu]; German: Oberch) is a village west of Dragatuš in the Municipality of Črnomelj in the White Carniola area of southeastern Slovenia. The area is part of the traditional region of Lower Carniola and is now included in the Southeast Slovenia Statistical Region.

== Name ==
The name of the settlement was changed from Obrh to Obrh pri Dragatušu in 1955. In the past the German name was Oberch.

== Church ==
The local church is dedicated to Saint Lawrence and belongs to the Parish of Dragatuš. It was first mentioned in written documents dating to 1427. Some 16th-century wall paintings survive on the interior.
