= Tušev Dol =

- Location in Slovenia
- Coordinates: 45°35′1.77″N 15°9′1.08″E
- Country: Slovenia
- Traditional region: White Carniola
- Statistical region: Southeast Slovenia
- Municipality: Črnomelj

Area
  - Total: 0.72 km^{2} (0.28 sq mi)
- Elevation: 192.4 m (631 ft)

Population (2020)
  - Total: 77
  - Density: 110/km^{2} (280/sq mi)
- Postal code: 8340

Tušev Dol (pronounced [ˈtuːʃɛu̯ ˈdoːu̯]; German: Tuschenthal) is a settlement west of Črnomelj in the White Carniola area of southeastern Slovenia. The area is part of the traditional region of Lower Carniola and is now included in the Southeast Slovenia Statistical Region.

The local church is dedicated to Mary Magdalene and belongs to the Parish of Črnomelj. It was first mentioned in written documents dating to 1526, but was thoroughly rebuilt in the Baroque style in the second half of the 18th century. The main altar dates to 1897.
