= Učakovci =

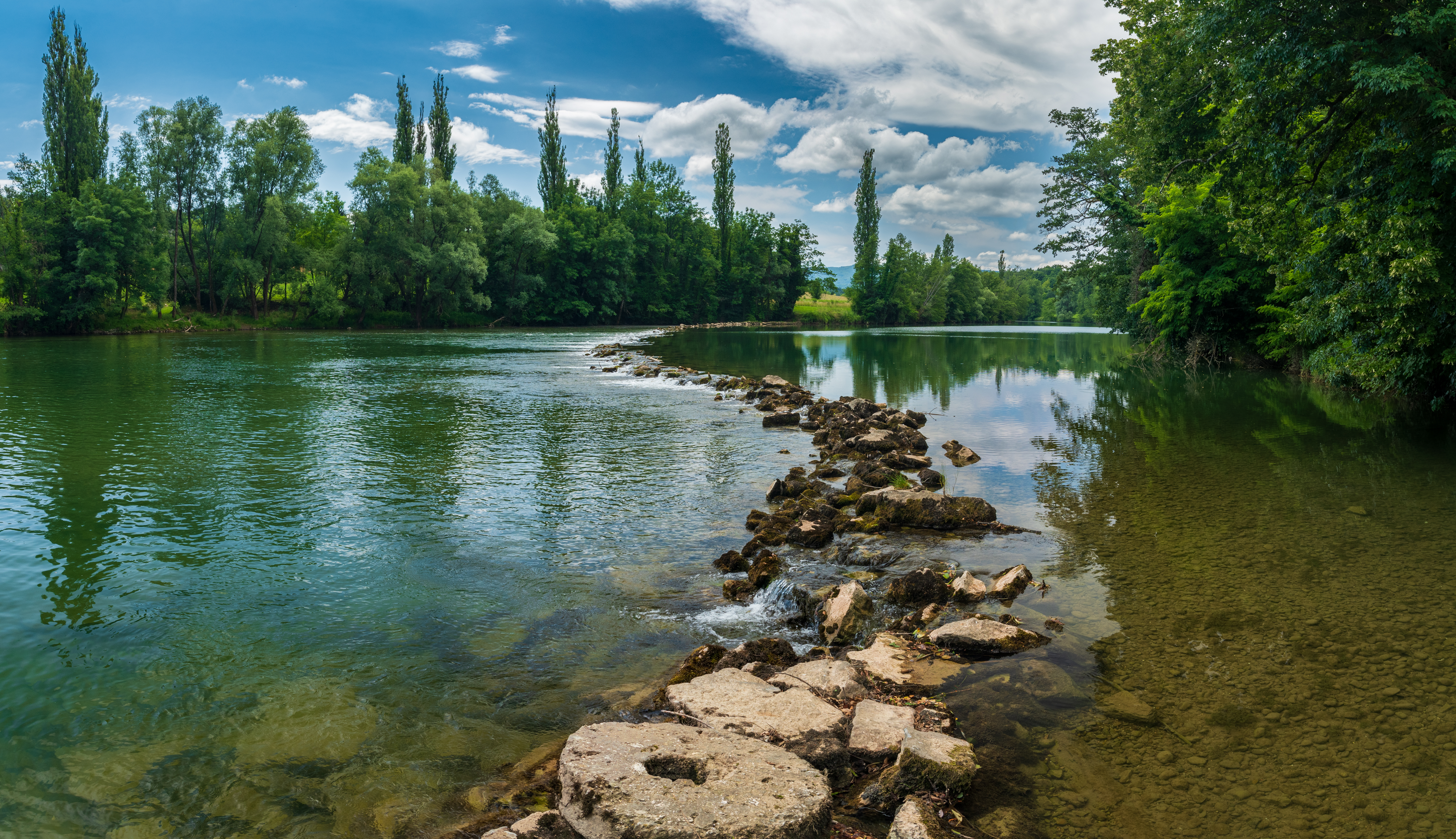
- Učakovci

- Location in Slovenia
- Coordinates: 45°26′29.45″N 15°13′45.94″E
- Country: Slovenia
- Traditional region: White Carniola
- Statistical region: Southeast Slovenia
- Municipality: Črnomelj

Area
  - Total: 4.27 km^{2} (1.65 sq mi)
- Elevation: 204.8 m (672 ft)

Population (2020)
  - Total: 114
  - Density: 26.7/km^{2} (69.1/sq mi)
- Postal code: 8344

Učakovci (pronounced [utʃaˈkoːu̯tsi]; German: Utschakouz) is a settlement on the left bank of the Kolpa River southwest of Vinica in the Municipality of Črnomelj in the White Carniola area of southeastern Slovenia. The area is part of the traditional region of Lower Carniola and is now included in the Southeast Slovenia Statistical Region.

There are two wayside shrines in the settlement. One was built after a flood in 1874 and is dedicated to Saint Nicholas. The second is dedicated to Our Lady of Sorrows and dates to the 19th century.
