= Kovača Vas, Črnomelj =

Kovača Vas
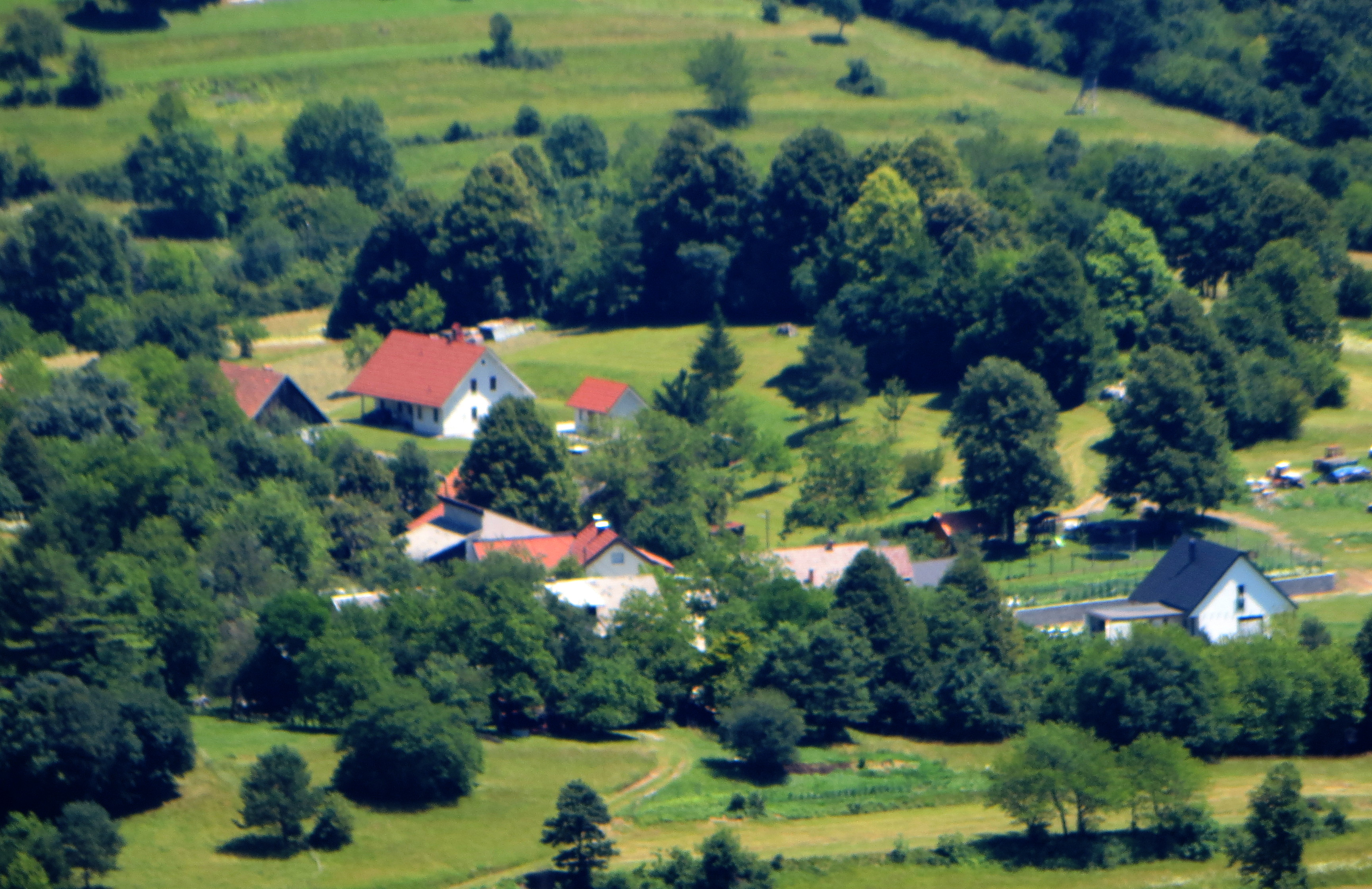

- Location in Slovenia
- Coordinates: 45°29′48.81″N 15°3′53.92″E
- Country: Slovenia
- Traditional region: White Carniola
- Statistical region: Southeast Slovenia
- Municipality: Črnomelj

Area
  - Total: 0.55 km^{2} (0.21 sq mi)
- Elevation: 403.7 m (1,324 ft)

Population (2020)
  - Total: 13
  - Density: 24/km^{2} (61/sq mi)
- Postal code: 8342

Kovača Vas (pronounced [kɔˈʋaːtʃa ˈʋaːs]; Slovene: Kovača vas, German: Schmieddorf) is a small village above the left bank of the Kolpa River in the Municipality of Črnomelj in the White Carniola area of southeastern Slovenia. The area is part of the traditional region of Lower Carniola and is now included in the Southeast Slovenia Statistical Region.

The local church is dedicated to Saint Anthony of Padua and belongs to the Parish of Stari Trg ob Kolpi. What is now the side chapel dedicated to Saint Anne was the sanctuary of the original medieval church that was extended in the 18th century. The entire church was renovated in 2000.
