= Dragovanja Vas =

- Location in Slovenia
- Coordinates: 45°32′32.74″N 15°9′10.82″E
- Country: Slovenia
- Traditional region: White Carniola
- Statistical region: Southeast Slovenia
- Municipality: Črnomelj

Area
  - Total: 0.81 km^{2} (0.31 sq mi)
- Elevation: 167.5 m (550 ft)

Population (2020)
  - Total: 102
  - Density: 130/km^{2} (330/sq mi)
- Postal code: 8343

Dragovanja Vas (pronounced [dɾaɡɔˈʋaːnja ˈʋaːs]; Slovene: Dragovanja vas, German: Dragoweinsdorf) is a small settlement southwest of Črnomelj in the White Carniola area of southeastern Slovenia. The area is part of the traditional region of Lower Carniola and is now included in the Southeast Slovenia Statistical Region.

The local church, built on the southern outskirts of the village, is dedicated to Saint Oswald (Slovene: sveti Ožbolt) and belongs to the Parish of Dragatuš. It was first mentioned in written documents dating to 1526, but owes its current Baroque look to a major remodelling in the 18th century. The main altar dates to 1876.
