= Doblička Gora =

- Location in Slovenia
- Coordinates: 45°33′54.78″N 15°8′11.09″E
- Country: Slovenia
- Traditional region: White Carniola
- Statistical region: Southeast Slovenia
- Municipality: Črnomelj

Area
  - Total: 0.77 km^{2} (0.30 sq mi)
- Elevation: 320.6 m (1,052 ft)

Population (2020)
  - Total: 62
  - Density: 81/km^{2} (210/sq mi)
- Postal code: 8340

Doblička Gora (pronounced [dɔˈbliːtʃka ˈɡɔːɾa]; German: Döblitschberg) is a settlement north of Dobliče in the Municipality of Črnomelj in the White Carniola area of southeastern Slovenia. The area is part of the traditional region of Lower Carniola and is now included in the Southeast Slovenia Statistical Region.

The local church is dedicated to Saint Vitus (Slovene: sveti Vid) and belongs to the Parish of Črnomelj. It was built in 1824 to replace a 17th-century building.
