= Črešnjevec pri Dragatušu =

- Location in Slovenia
- Coordinates: 45°30′33.56″N 15°12′13.87″E
- Country: Slovenia
- Traditional region: White Carniola
- Statistical region: Southeast Slovenia
- Municipality: Črnomelj

Area
  - Total: 3.74 km^{2} (1.44 sq mi)
- Elevation: 201.7 m (662 ft)

Population (2020)
  - Total: 2
  - Density: 0.53/km^{2} (1.4/sq mi)
- Postal code: 8343

Črešnjevec pri Dragatušu (pronounced [ˈtʃɾeːʃnjɛʋəts pɾi dɾaɡaˈtuːʃu]; German: Kerschdorf) is a small settlement in the hills southeast of Dragatuš in the Municipality of Črnomelj in the White Carniola area of southeastern Slovenia. The area is part of the traditional region of Lower Carniola and is now included in the Southeast Slovenia Statistical Region.

== Name ==
The name of the settlement was changed from Črešnjevec to Črešnjevec pri Dragatušu in 1953.
