= Tribuče =

- Location in Slovenia
- Coordinates: 45°32′42.54″N 15°14′34.95″E
- Country: Slovenia
- Traditional region: White Carniola
- Statistical region: Southeast Slovenia
- Municipality: Črnomelj

Area
  - Total: 9.07 km^{2} (3.50 sq mi)
- Elevation: 189.9 m (623 ft)

Population (2020)
  - Total: 323
  - Density: 35.6/km^{2} (92.2/sq mi)
- Postal code: 8340

Tribuče (pronounced [tɾiˈbuːtʃɛ]; German: Tributsche) is a settlement in the Municipality of Črnomelj in the White Carniola area of southeastern Slovenia. It is made up of a number of smaller settlements scattered along the road from Črnomelj to Adlešiči: Dolenjsko Selo, Šikonijsko Selo, Vlaščansko Selo, Nova Gorica, and Golek. The area is part of the traditional region of Lower Carniola and is now included in the Southeast Slovenia Statistical Region.

There is a small church in the settlement. It is dedicated to John the Baptist and belongs to the Parish of Adlešiči. It preserves its older nave, to which a new sanctuary and belfry were added in the late 18th century.
