= Butoraj =

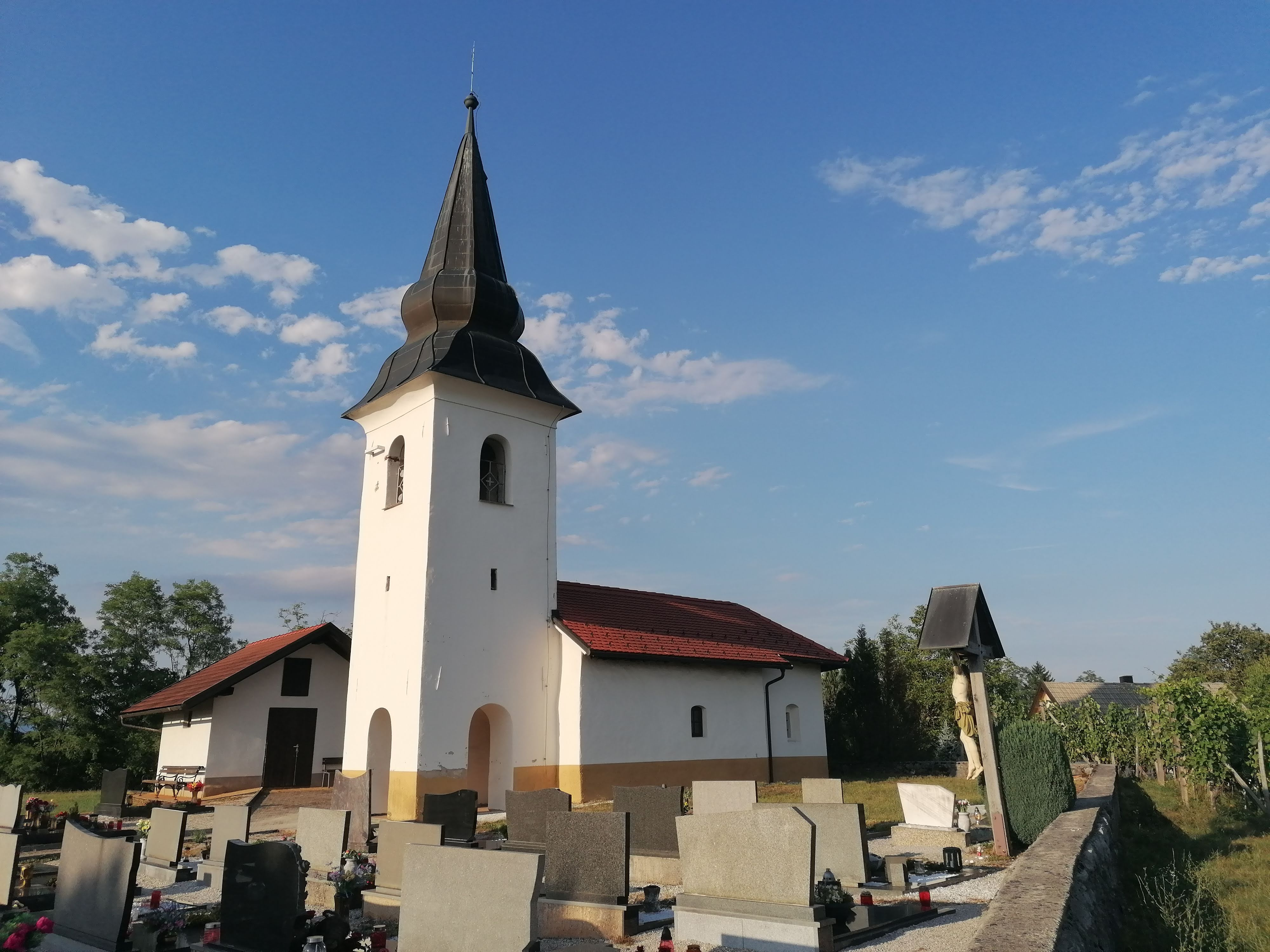
- Saint Mark's Church

- Location in Slovenia
- Coordinates: 45°32′36.33″N 15°12′20.77″E
- Country: Slovenia
- Traditional region: White Carniola
- Statistical region: Southeast Slovenia
- Municipality: Črnomelj

Area
  - Total: 2.14 km^{2} (0.83 sq mi)
- Elevation: 193.8 m (636 ft)

Population (2020)
  - Total: 123
  - Density: 57.5/km^{2} (149/sq mi)
- Postal code: 8340

Butoraj (pronounced [buˈtoːɾai̯]; German: Wutarei) is a settlement in the hills south of Črnomelj in the White Carniola area of southeastern Slovenia. The area is part of the traditional region of Lower Carniola and is now included in the Southeast Slovenia Statistical Region.

The local church, built on a small hill southeast of the village, is dedicated to Saint Mark and belongs to the Parish of Črnomelj. It was first mentioned in written documents dating back to 1526, but was thoroughly restyled in the Baroque style in the 18th century. The main altar dates back to 1894.

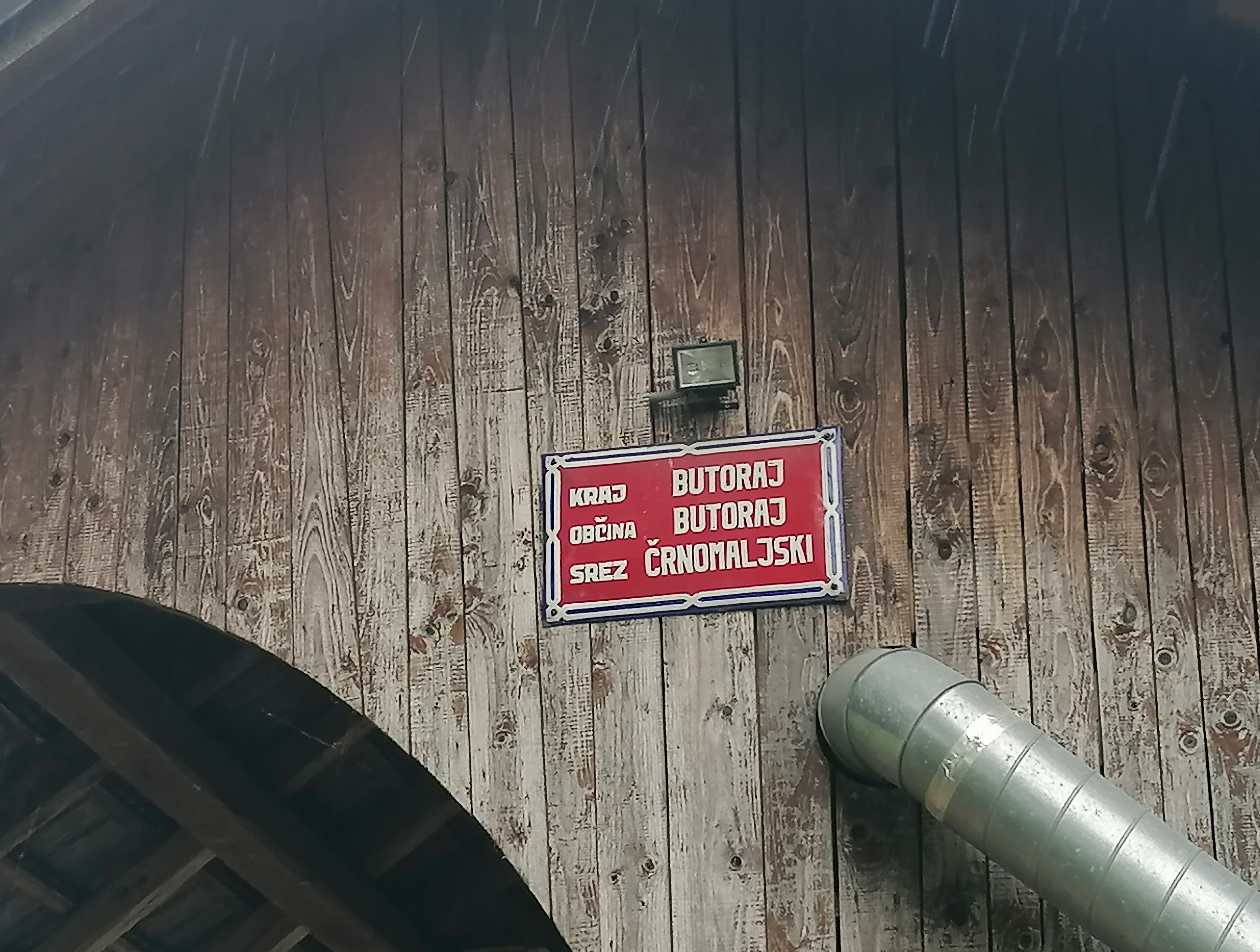
Former settlement border sign

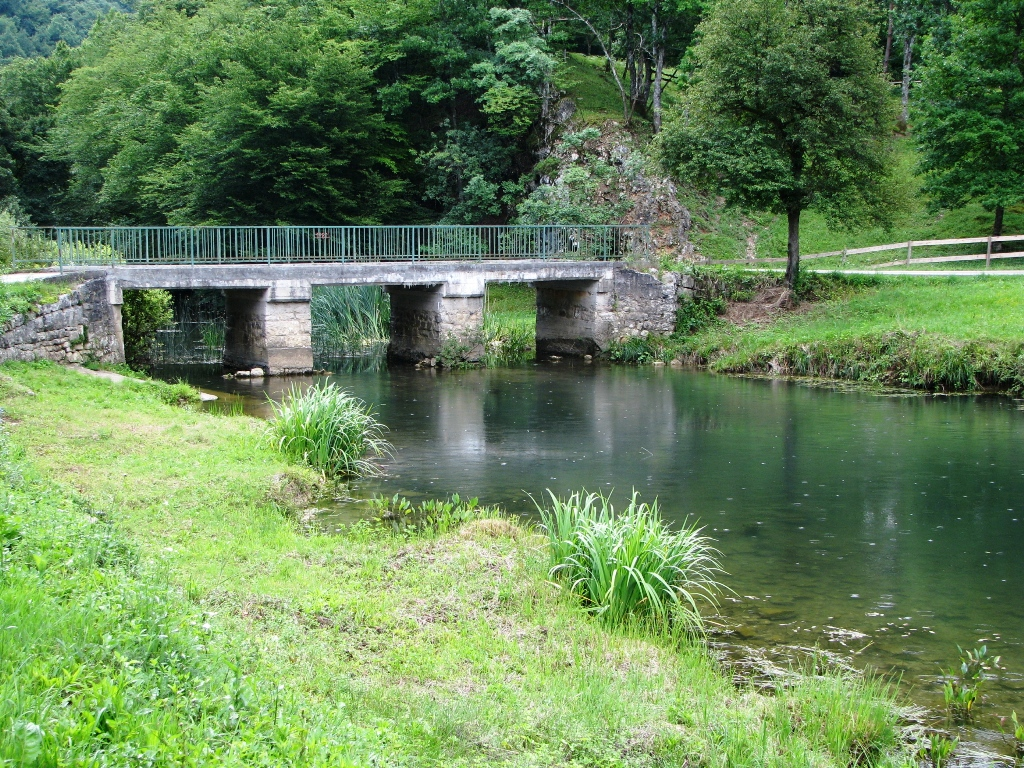
Lahinja
