= Dragoši =

- Location in Slovenia
- Coordinates: 45°33′24.83″N 15°17′53.42″E
- Country: Slovenia
- Traditional region: White Carniola
- Statistical region: Southeast Slovenia
- Municipality: Črnomelj

Area
  - Total: 3.59 km^{2} (1.39 sq mi)
- Elevation: 145.8 m (478 ft)

Population (2020)
  - Total: 16
  - Density: 4.5/km^{2} (12/sq mi)
- Postal code: 8341

Dragoši (pronounced [ˈdɾaːɡɔʃi]) is a settlement on the left bank of the Kolpa River east of Črnomelj in the White Carniola area of southeastern Slovenia. The area is part of the traditional region of Lower Carniola and is now included in the Southeast Slovenia Statistical Region.

An archaeological field survey in 2002 revealed the existence of prehistoric and Roman settlements in the area.
