= Deskova Vas =

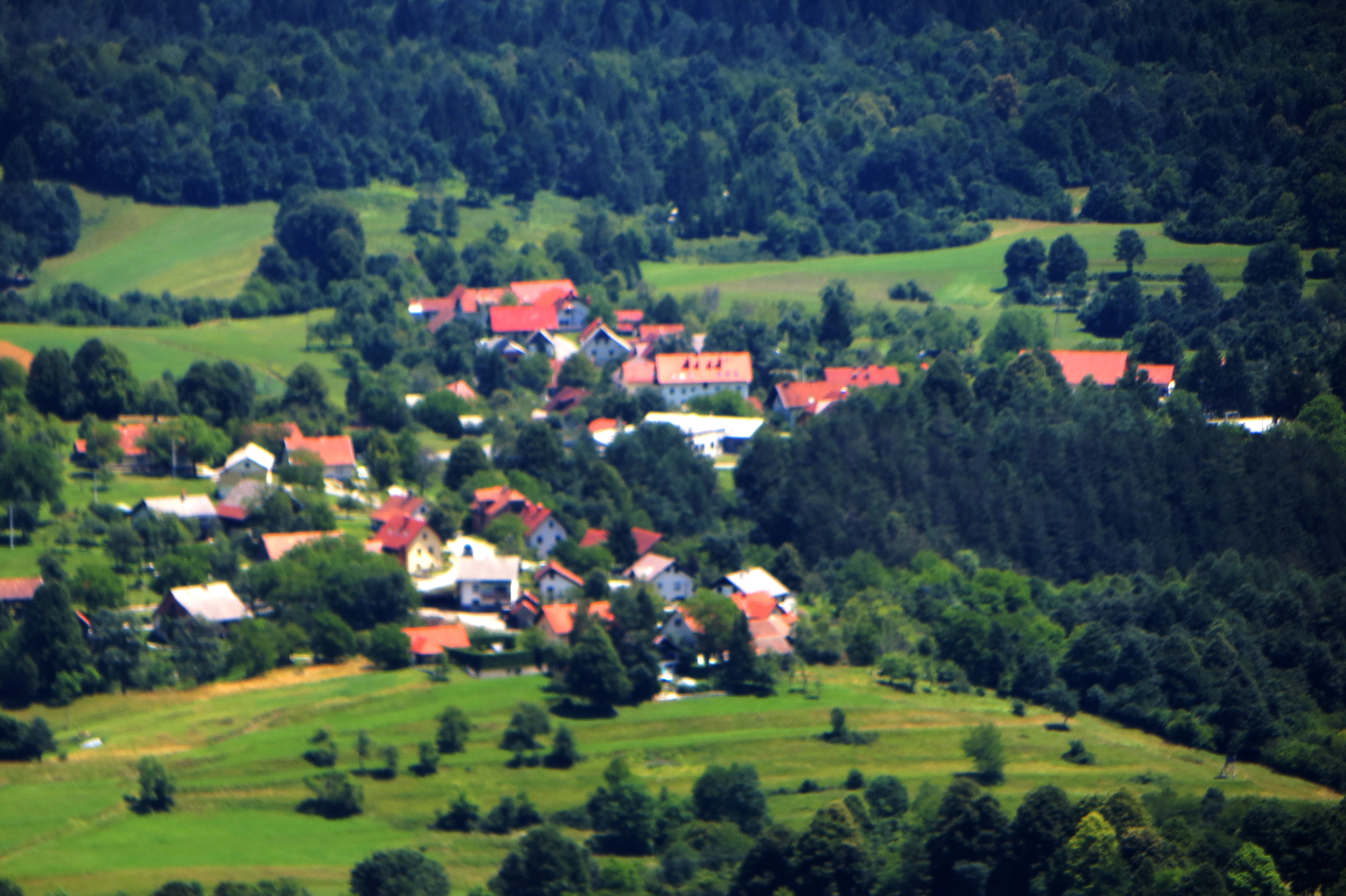

- Location in Slovenia
- Coordinates: 45°29′48.79″N 15°4′19.25″E
- Country: Slovenia
- Traditional region: White Carniola
- Statistical region: Southeast Slovenia
- Municipality: Črnomelj

Area
  - Total: 0.65 km^{2} (0.25 sq mi)
- Elevation: 407.9 m (1,338 ft)

Population (2020)
  - Total: 30
  - Density: 46/km^{2} (120/sq mi)
- Postal code: 8342

Deskova Vas (pronounced [ˈdeːskɔʋa ˈʋaːs]; Slovene: Deskova vas, German: Bretterdorf) is a small settlement in the hills above the left bank of the Kolpa River in the Municipality of Črnomelj in the White Carniola area of southeastern Slovenia. The area is part of the traditional region of Lower Carniola and is now included in the Southeast Slovenia Statistical Region.
