= Desinec, Črnomelj =

Desinec
- Location in Slovenia
- Coordinates: 45°33′38.62″N 15°14′19.05″E
- Country: Slovenia
- Traditional region: White Carniola
- Statistical region: Southeast Slovenia
- Municipality: Črnomelj

Area
  - Total: 2.82 km^{2} (1.09 sq mi)
- Elevation: 198.2 m (650 ft)

Population (2020)
  - Total: 65
  - Density: 23/km^{2} (60/sq mi)
- Postal code: 8340

Desinec (pronounced [dɛˈsiːnəts]) is a settlement in the eastern part of the Municipality of Črnomelj in the White Carniola area of southeastern Slovenia. The area is part of the traditional region of Lower Carniola and is now included in the Southeast Slovenia Statistical Region.

The local parish church is dedicated to Saint Mark and belongs to the Parish of Črnomelj. It is a medieval building that was restyled in the Baroque style in the 18th century.
