= Petrova Vas =

- Location in Slovenia
- Coordinates: 45°36′46.03″N 15°9′38.29″E
- Country: Slovenia
- Traditional region: White Carniola
- Statistical region: Southeast Slovenia
- Municipality: Črnomelj

Area
  - Total: 2.11 km^{2} (0.81 sq mi)
- Elevation: 206 m (676 ft)

Population (2020)
  - Total: 102
  - Density: 48.3/km^{2} (125/sq mi)
- Postal code: 8340

Petrova Vas (pronounced [pɛˈtɾɔːʋa ˈʋaːs] or [pɛˈtɾoːʋa ˈʋaːs]; Slovene: Petrova vas, German: Petersdorf) is a settlement north of Črnomelj in the White Carniola area of southeastern Slovenia. The area is part of the traditional region of Lower Carniola and is now included in the Southeast Slovenia Statistical Region.

== Church ==
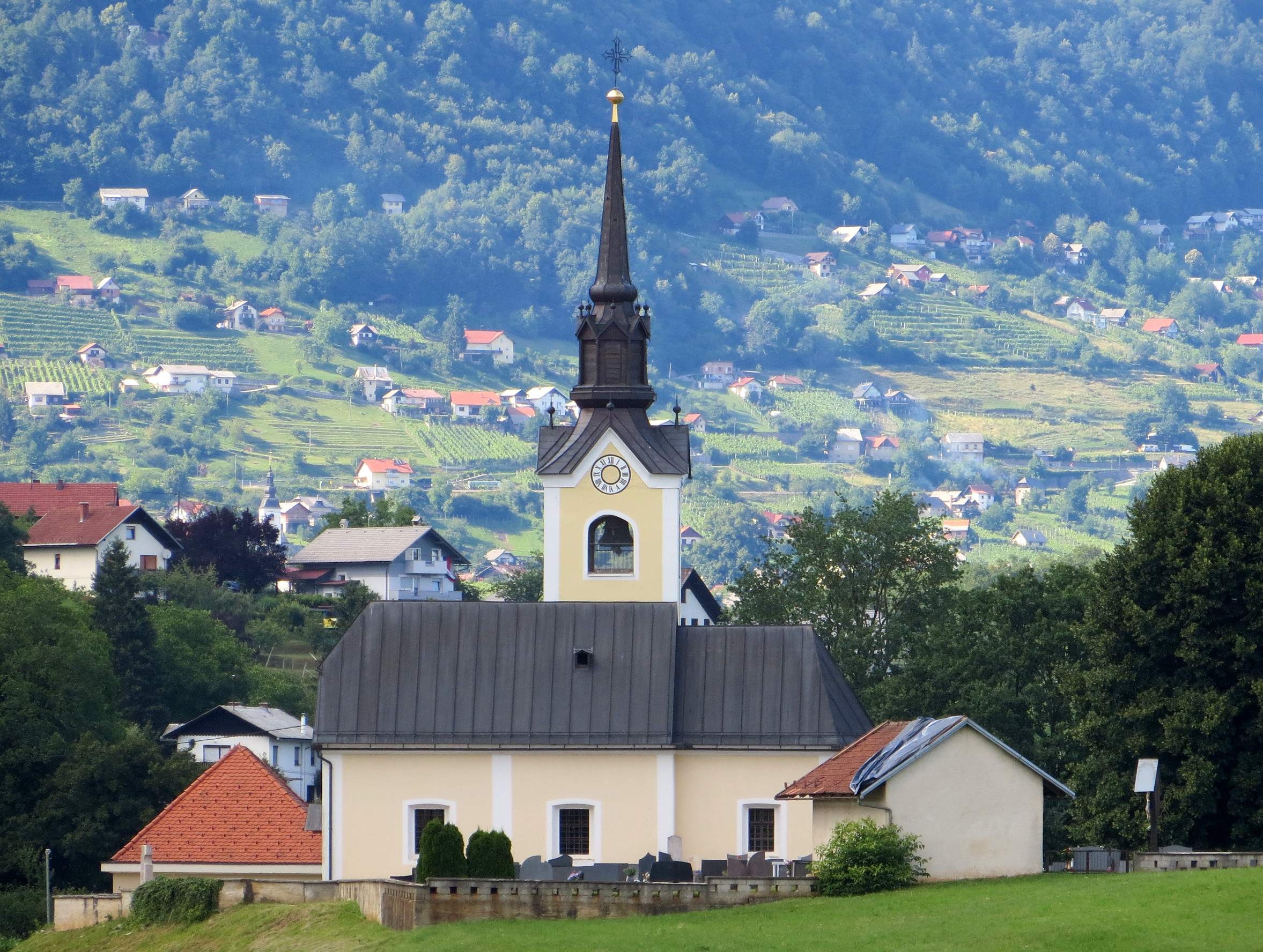
John the Baptist Church

The local church is dedicated to John the Baptist (Slovene: sveti Janez Krstnik) and belongs to the Parish of Črnomelj. It was first mentioned in written documents dating to 1526, but has been extensively altered over the centuries.
