= Golek pri Vinici =

- Location in Slovenia
- Coordinates: 45°27′53.46″N 15°15′28.02″E
- Country: Slovenia
- Traditional region: White Carniola
- Statistical region: Southeast Slovenia
- Municipality: Črnomelj

Area
  - Total: 2.79 km^{2} (1.08 sq mi)
- Elevation: 194.9 m (639 ft)

Population (2020)
  - Total: 52
  - Density: 19/km^{2} (48/sq mi)
- Postal code: 8344

Golek pri Vinici (pronounced [ˈɡoːlək pɾi ˈʋiːnitsi]; German: Golek bei Weinitz) is a settlement north of Vinica in the Municipality of Črnomelj in the White Carniola area of southeastern Slovenia. The area is part of the traditional region of Lower Carniola and is now included in the Southeast Slovenia Statistical Region.
