= Vojna Vas =

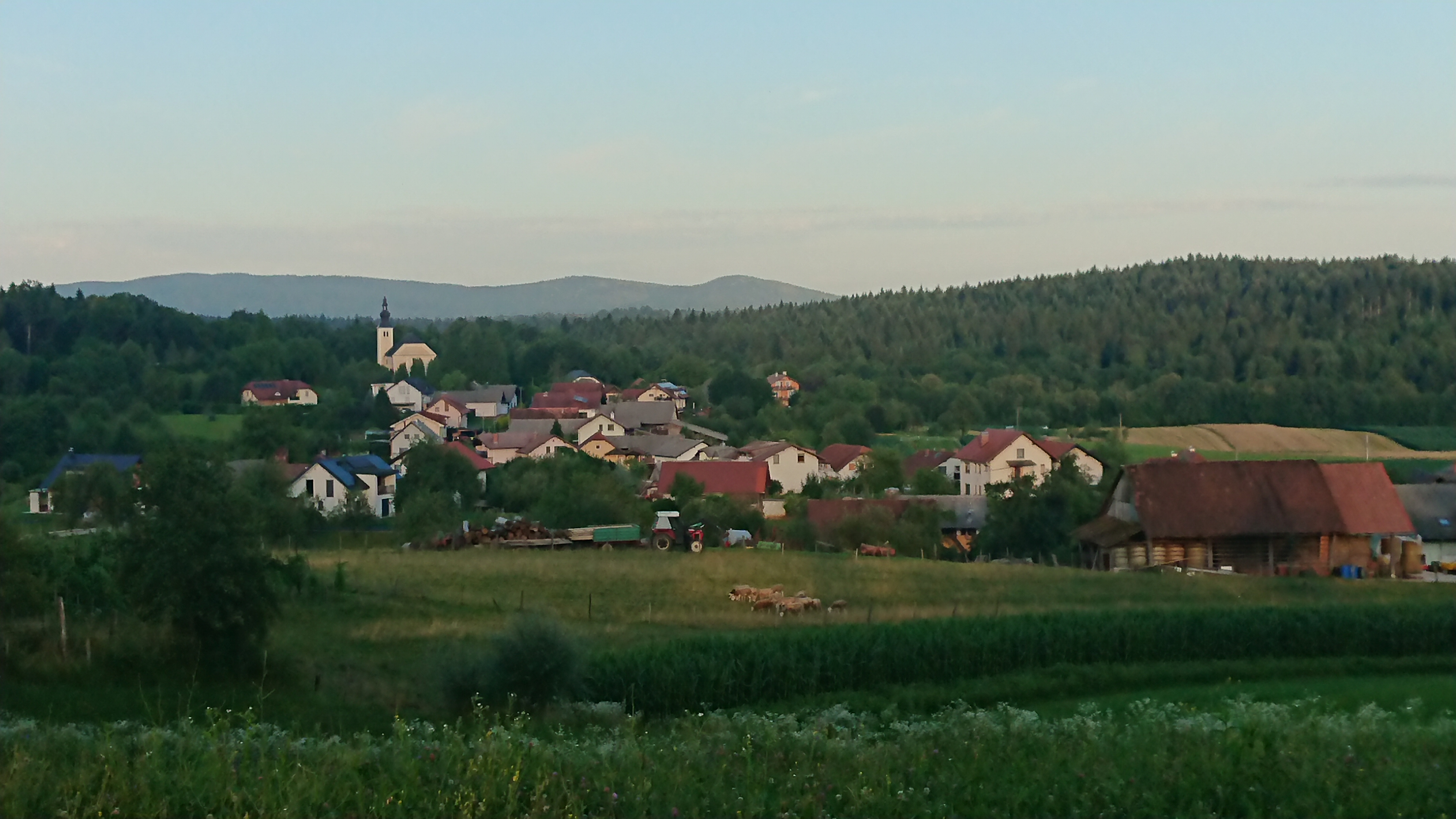

- Location in Slovenia
- Coordinates: 45°34′23.26″N 15°12′5.48″E
- Country: Slovenia
- Traditional region: White Carniola
- Statistical region: Southeast Slovenia
- Municipality: Črnomelj

Area
  - Total: 0.53 km^{2} (0.20 sq mi)
- Elevation: 163.2 m (535 ft)

Population (2020)
  - Total: 114
  - Density: 220/km^{2} (560/sq mi)
- Postal code: 8340

Vojna Vas (pronounced [ˈʋoːi̯na ˈʋaːs]; Slovene: Vojna vas) is a settlement on the left bank of the Lahinja River east of Črnomelj in the White Carniola area of southeastern Slovenia. The area is part of the traditional region of Lower Carniola and is now included in the Southeast Slovenia Statistical Region.

The local church is dedicated to the Nativity of Mary and belongs to the Parish of Črnomelj. It was built in the 18th century.
