= Vrhovci, Črnomelj =

Vrhovci
- Location in Slovenia
- Coordinates: 45°30′30.29″N 15°19′26.48″E
- Country: Slovenia
- Traditional region: White Carniola
- Statistical region: Southeast Slovenia
- Municipality: Črnomelj

Area
  - Total: 2.32 km^{2} (0.90 sq mi)
- Elevation: 239.1 m (784 ft)

Population (2020)
  - Total: 51
  - Density: 22/km^{2} (57/sq mi)
- Postal code: 8341
- Climate: Cfb

Vrhovci (pronounced [ʋəɾˈxoːu̯tsi]) is a small settlement on the left bank of the Kolpa River in the Municipality of Črnomelj in the White Carniola area of southeastern Slovenia. The area is part of the traditional region of Lower Carniola and is now included in the Southeast Slovenia Statistical Region.

A small roadside chapel in the village is dedicated to Our Lady of Sorrows and dates to 1836.
