= Balkovci =

- Location in Slovenia
- Coordinates: 45°27′32.75″N 15°19′30.52″E
- Country: Slovenia
- Traditional region: White Carniola
- Statistical region: Southeast Slovenia
- Municipality: Črnomelj

Area
  - Total: 1.68 km^{2} (0.65 sq mi)
- Elevation: 295.4 m (969 ft)

Population (2020)
  - Total: 46
  - Density: 27/km^{2} (71/sq mi)
- Postal code: 8344

Balkovci (pronounced [balˈkoːu̯tsi]) is a settlement on the left bank of the Kolpa River in the Municipality of Črnomelj, in the White Carniola area of southeastern Slovenia, part of the traditional Lower Carniola now included in the Southeast Slovenia Statistical Region. It includes four hamlets: Dejani, Grduni, Pavlini, and Balkovci.

== Demographic evolution ==
Historical population

Year	Pop.	±%
1869	139	—
1880	142	+2.2%
1890	112	−21.1%
1900	106	−5.4%
1910	106	+0.0%

Year	Pop.	±%
1931	103	−2.8%
1948	105	+1.9%
1953	87	−17.1%
1961	75	−13.8%
1966	68	−9.3%

Year	Pop.	±%
1971	70	+2.9%
1981	75	+7.1%
1991	61	−18.7%
2002	56	−8.2%

Source: Data from ISTAT
