= Pavičiči =

- Location in Slovenia
- Coordinates: 45°34′48.27″N 15°14′33.00″E
- Country: Slovenia
- Traditional region: White Carniola
- Statistical region: Southeast Slovenia
- Municipality: Črnomelj

Area
  - Total: 1.7 km^{2} (0.66 sq mi)

Population (2020)
  - Total: 24
  - Density: 14/km^{2} (37/sq mi)
- Postal code: 8340

Pavičiči (pronounced [paˈʋiːtʃitʃi]) is a small village in the Municipality of Črnomelj in southeastern Slovenia. Until 2007, the area was part of the settlement of Zastava. The village is part of the traditional region of White Carniola and is included in the Southeast Slovenia Statistical Region.
