= Gorenji Radenci =

- Location in Slovenia
- Coordinates: 45°28′6.71″N 15°5′18.05″E
- Country: Slovenia
- Traditional region: White Carniola
- Statistical region: Southeast Slovenia
- Municipality: Črnomelj

Area
  - Total: 0.7 km^{2} (0.27 sq mi)
- Elevation: 198.4 m (651 ft)

Population (2020)
  - Total: 29
  - Density: 41/km^{2} (110/sq mi)
- Postal code: 8342

Gorenji Radenci (pronounced [ɡɔˈɾeːnji ɾaˈdeːntsi]; German: Oberradenze) is a settlement on the left bank of the Kolpa River in the Municipality of Črnomelj in the White Carniola area of southeastern Slovenia. The area is part of the traditional region of Lower Carniola and is now included in the Southeast Slovenia Statistical Region.

There is a small church in the settlement dedicated to Mary Magdalene. It was built in the 17th century and belongs to the Parish of Stari Trg ob Kolpi.
