= Mali Nerajec =

- Location in Slovenia
- Coordinates: 45°30′6.44″N 15°11′24.48″E
- Country: Slovenia
- Traditional region: White Carniola
- Statistical region: Southeast Slovenia
- Municipality: Črnomelj

Area
  - Total: 0.6 km^{2} (0.23 sq mi)
- Elevation: 157.2 m (516 ft)

Population (2020)
  - Total: 43
  - Density: 72/km^{2} (190/sq mi)
- Postal code: 8343

Mali Nerajec (pronounced [ˈmaːli nɛˈɾaːjəts]; German: Kleinnaraiz) is a small settlement south of Dragatuš in the Municipality of Črnomelj in the White Carniola area of southeastern Slovenia. The area is part of the traditional region of Lower Carniola and is now included in the Southeast Slovenia Statistical Region.
