= Dolenja Vas pri Črnomlju =

- Location in Slovenia
- Coordinates: 45°34′20.6″N 15°12′39.6″E
- Country: Slovenia
- Traditional region: White Carniola
- Statistical region: Southeast Slovenia
- Municipality: Črnomelj

Area
  - Total: 2.32 km^{2} (0.90 sq mi)
- Elevation: 157.6 m (517 ft)

Population (2020)
  - Total: 65
  - Density: 28/km^{2} (73/sq mi)
- Postal code: 8340

Dolenja Vas pri Črnomlju (pronounced [dɔˈleːnja ˈʋaːs pɾi tʃəɾˈnoːmlju]; Slovene: Dolenja vas pri Črnomlju) is a settlement on the left bank of the Lahinja River, immediately east of the town of Črnomelj in the White Carniola area of southeastern Slovenia. The area is part of the traditional region of Lower Carniola and is now included in the Southeast Slovenia Statistical Region.

== Name ==
The name of the settlement was changed from Dolenja vas to Dolenja vas pri Črnomlju in 1955.
