= Municipality of Črnomelj =

Municipality of Slovenia

Municipality of Črnomelj Občina Črnomelj
- Municipality
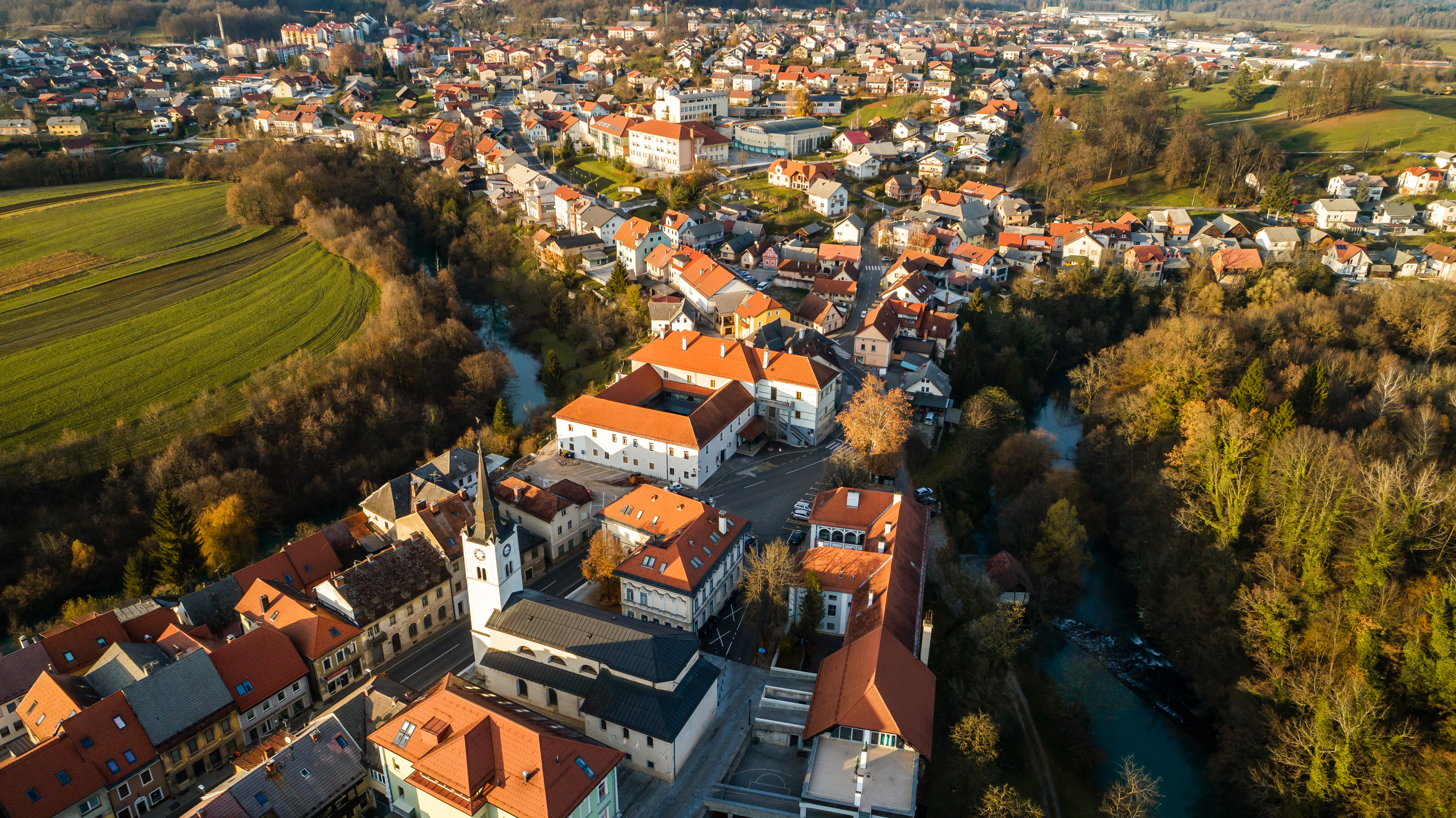

- Flag Coat of arms

- Location of the Municipality of Črnomelj in Slovenia
- Coordinates: 45°34′N 15°12′E
- Country: Slovenia

Government
  - Mayor: Andrej Kavšek (GS)

Area
  - Total: 339.7 km^{2} (131.2 sq mi)

Population (2002)
  - Total: 14,580
  - Density: 42.92/km^{2} (111.2/sq mi)
- Time zone: UTC+01 (CET)
  - Summer (DST): UTC+02 (CEST)
- Website: www.crnomelj.si

The Municipality of Črnomelj (pronounced [tʃəɾˈnoːməl]; Slovene: Občina Črnomelj) is a municipality in southeastern Slovenia. The seat of the municipality is the town of Črnomelj. The municipality is at the heart of the area of White Carniola, the southeastern part of the traditional region of Lower Carniola. It is now included in the Southeast Slovenia Statistical Region. It borders Croatia on the Kolpa River.

== Settlements ==
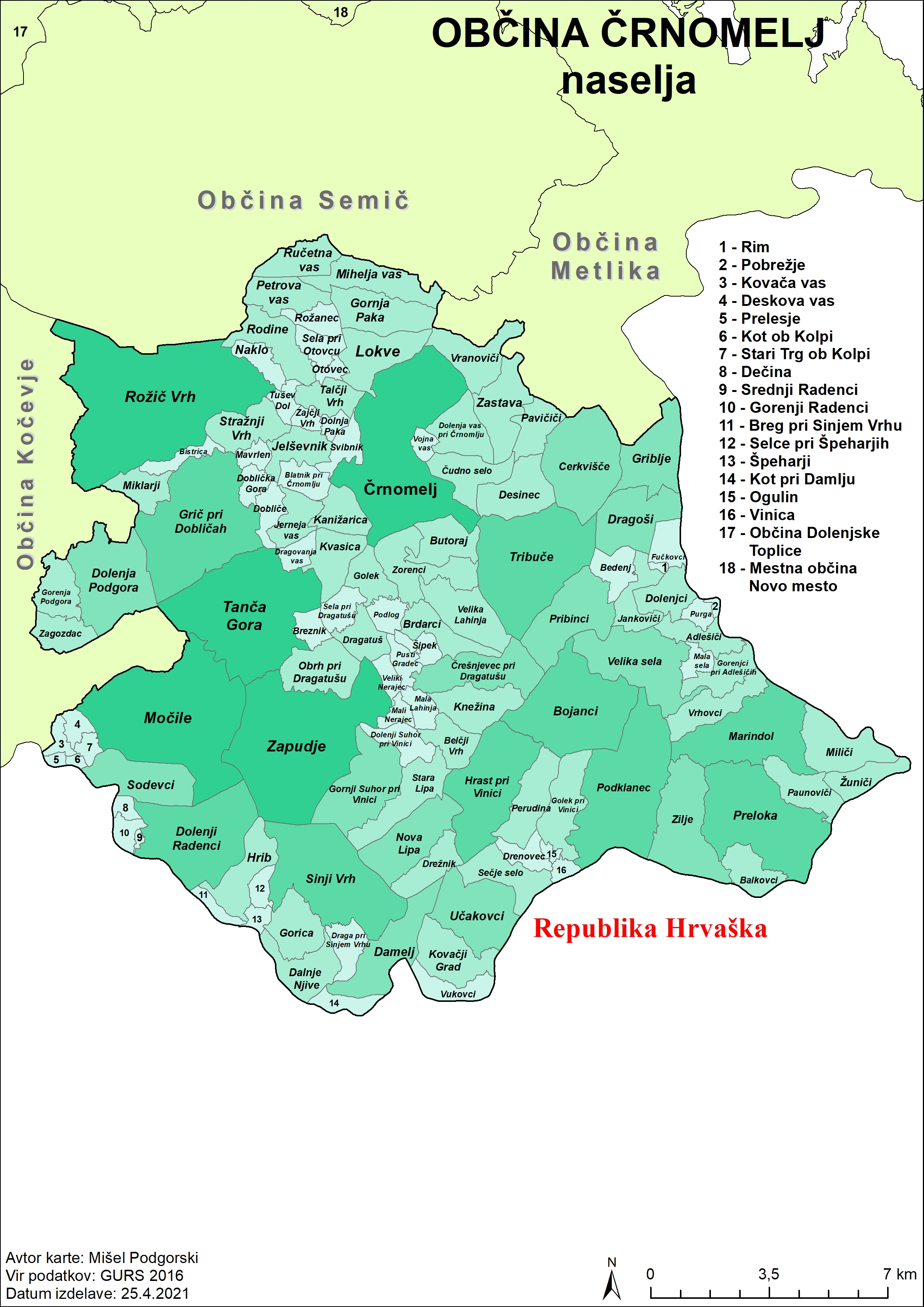
Villages in the municipality

In addition to the municipal seat of Črnomelj, the municipality also includes the following settlements:

- Adlešiči
- Balkovci
- Bedenj
- Belčji Vrh
- Bistrica
- Blatnik pri Črnomlju
- Bojanci
- Brdarci
- Breg pri Sinjem Vrhu
- Breznik
- Butoraj
- Cerkvišče
- Črešnjevec pri Dragatušu
- Čudno Selo
- Dalnje Njive
- Damelj
- Dečina
- Desinec
- Deskova Vas
- Dobliče
- Doblička Gora
- Dolenja Podgora
- Dolenja Vas pri Črnomlju
- Dolenjci
- Dolenji Radenci
- Dolenji Suhor pri Vinici
- Dolnja Paka
- Draga pri Sinjem Vrhu
- Dragatuš
- Dragoši
- Dragovanja Vas
- Drenovec
- Drežnik
- Fučkovci
- Golek
- Golek pri Vinici
- Gorenja Podgora
- Gorenjci pri Adlešičih
- Gorenji Radenci
- Gorica
- Gornja Paka
- Gornji Suhor pri Vinici
- Griblje
- Grič pri Dobličah
- Hrast pri Vinici
- Hrib
- Jankoviči
- Jelševnik
- Jerneja Vas
- Kanižarica
- Knežina
- Kot ob Kolpi
- Kot pri Damlju
- Kovača Vas
- Kovačji Grad
- Kvasica
- Lokve
- Mala Lahinja
- Mala Sela
- Mali Nerajec
- Marindol
- Mavrlen
- Mihelja Vas
- Miklarji
- Miliči
- Močile
- Naklo
- Nova Lipa
- Obrh pri Dragatušu
- Ogulin
- Otovec
- Paunoviči
- Pavičiči
- Perudina
- Petrova Vas
- Pobrežje
- Podklanec
- Podlog
- Prelesje
- Preloka
- Pribinci
- Purga
- Pusti Gradec
- Rim
- Rodine
- Rožanec
- Rožič Vrh
- Ručetna Vas
- Sečje Selo
- Sela pri Dragatušu
- Sela pri Otovcu
- Selce pri Špeharjih
- Sinji Vrh
- Šipek
- Sodevci
- Špeharji
- Srednji Radenci
- Stara Lipa
- Stari Trg ob Kolpi
- Stražnji Vrh
- Svibnik
- Talčji Vrh
- Tanča Gora
- Tribuče
- Tušev Dol
- Učakovci
- Velika Lahinja
- Velika Sela
- Veliki Nerajec
- Vinica
- Vojna Vas
- Vranoviči
- Vrhovci
- Vukovci
- Zagozdac
- Zajčji Vrh
- Zapudje
- Zastava
- Zilje
- Zorenci
- Žuniči
