= Zagozdac =

- Location in Slovenia
- Coordinates: 45°31′31.18″N 15°3′39.29″E
- Country: Slovenia
- Traditional region: White Carniola
- Statistical region: Southeast Slovenia
- Municipality: Črnomelj

Area
  - Total: 1.58 km^{2} (0.61 sq mi)
- Elevation: 393.3 m (1,290 ft)

Population (2020)
  - Total: 26
  - Density: 16/km^{2} (43/sq mi)
- Postal code: 8342

Zagozdac (pronounced [zaˈɡoːzdats] or [zaɡɔˈzdaːts]; German: Unterwald) is a settlement in the Municipality of Črnomelj in the White Carniola area of southeastern Slovenia. The area is part of the traditional region of Lower Carniola and is now included in the Southeast Slovenia Statistical Region.

The local church is dedicated to the Virgin Mary and belongs to the Parish of Stari Trg ob Kolpi. It was built in the early 18th century.
