= Sečje Selo =

- Location in Slovenia
- Coordinates: 45°27′26.03″N 15°14′40.94″E
- Country: Slovenia
- Traditional region: White Carniola
- Statistical region: Southeast Slovenia
- Municipality: Črnomelj

Area
  - Total: 2.37 km^{2} (0.92 sq mi)
- Elevation: 182 m (597 ft)

Population (2020)
  - Total: 104
  - Density: 43.9/km^{2} (114/sq mi)
- Postal code: 8344

Sečje Selo (pronounced [ˈseːtʃjɛ ˈsɛːlɔ]; Slovene: Sečje selo) is a settlement on the left bank of the Kolpa River west of Vinica in the Municipality of Črnomelj in the White Carniola area of southeastern Slovenia. The area is part of the traditional region of Lower Carniola and is now included in the Southeast Slovenia Statistical Region.

== Sports ==
The Gorski Kotar Bike Tour, held annually since 2012, sometimes goes through Sečje Selo, such as in the first leg for 2024.
