= Zorenci =

- Location in Slovenia
- Coordinates: 45°32′21.76″N 15°12′14.26″E
- Country: Slovenia
- Traditional region: White Carniola
- Statistical region: Southeast Slovenia
- Municipality: Črnomelj

Area
  - Total: 3.22 km^{2} (1.24 sq mi)
- Elevation: 167.1 m (548 ft)

Population (2020)
  - Total: 27
  - Density: 8.4/km^{2} (22/sq mi)
- Postal code: 8340

Zorenci (pronounced [zɔˈɾeːntsi]) is a settlement on the left bank of the Lahinja River south of Črnomelj in the White Carniola area of southeastern Slovenia. The area is part of the traditional region of Lower Carniola and is now included in the Southeast Slovenia Statistical Region.

== Name ==
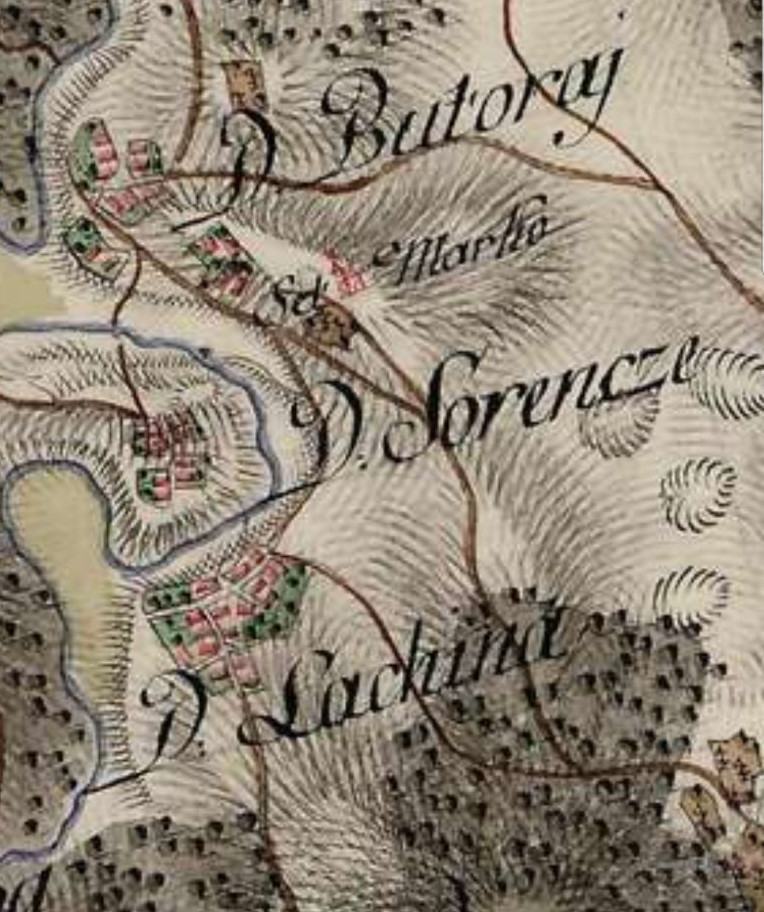
D[orf] Sorencze (i.e., Zorenci) on the First Military Survey Map (1763–1787)

Zorenci was attested in 1463 as Saremcz (and Sorenze in 1744, Sorenzze in 1780, and Sorrenze in 1824). The name Zorenci was created as a folk name from the original local name *Zorenja vas, which is derived from the name Zoren based on the personal name *Zor, Zorislav. Its formation is similar to that of the name Radenci.

== History ==
An archaeological site in the settlement has revealed the presence of an extensive Eneolithic and Bronze Age settlement in the area.
