= Veliki Nerajec =

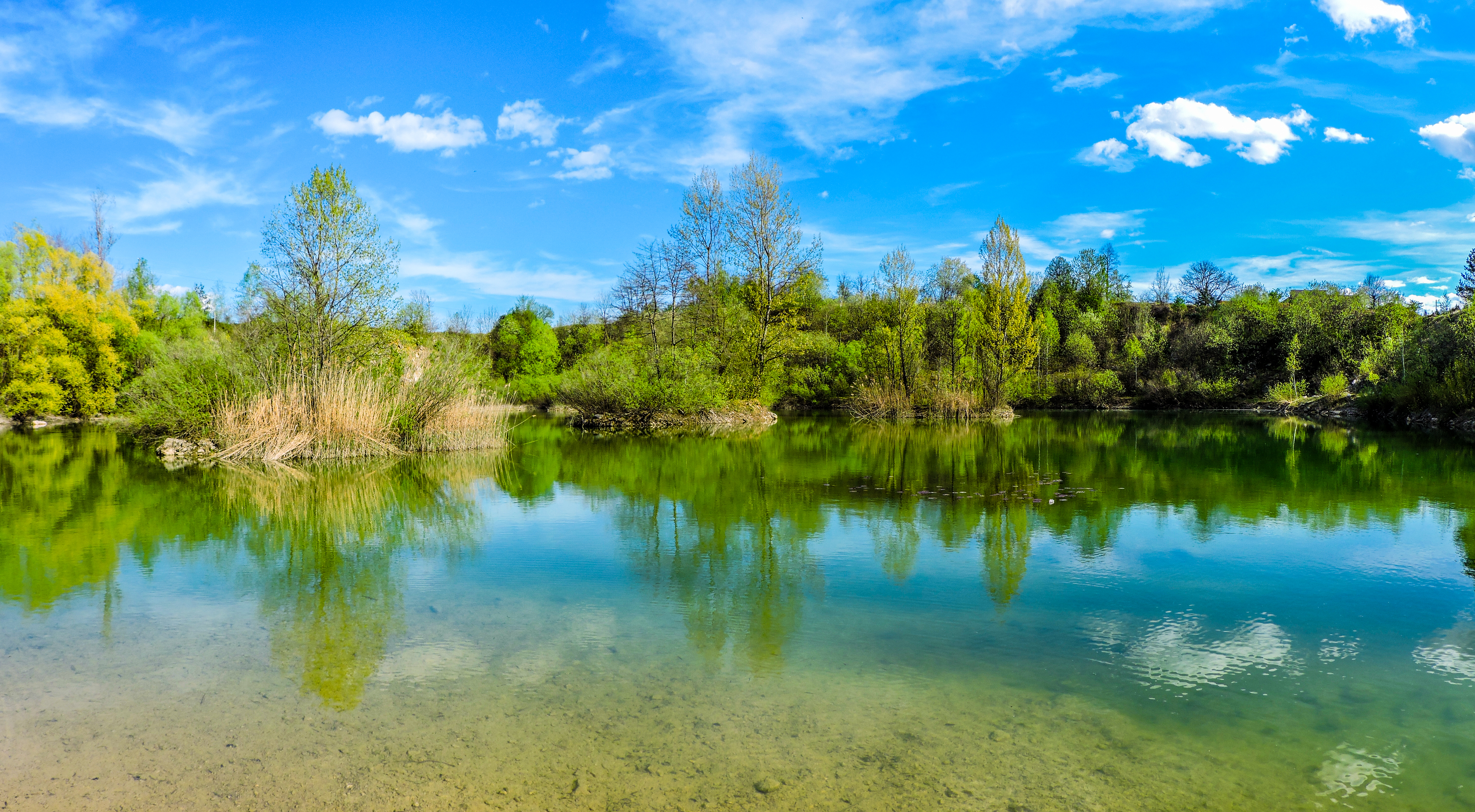
- Nerajec Pond in a former quarry in Veliki Nerajec

- Location in Slovenia
- Coordinates: 45°30′32.04″N 15°11′18.57″E
- Country: Slovenia
- Traditional region: White Carniola
- Statistical region: Southeast Slovenia
- Municipality: Črnomelj

Area
  - Total: 0.63 km^{2} (0.24 sq mi)
- Elevation: 170.3 m (559 ft)

Population (2020)
  - Total: 72
  - Density: 110/km^{2} (300/sq mi)
- Postal code: 8343

Veliki Nerajec (pronounced [ˈʋeːliki nɛˈɾaːjəts]; German: Großnaraiz) is a village south of Dragatuš in the Municipality of Črnomelj in the White Carniola area of southeastern Slovenia. The area is part of the traditional region of Lower Carniola and is now included in the Southeast Slovenia Statistical Region.

A small chapel-shrine in the centre of the settlement is dedicated to the Holy Family and belongs to the Parish of Dragatuš.
