= Gorenjci pri Adlešičih =

- Location in Slovenia
- Coordinates: 45°30′53.65″N 15°19′13.25″E
- Country: Slovenia
- Traditional region: White Carniola
- Statistical region: Southeast Slovenia
- Municipality: Črnomelj

Area
  - Total: 1.75 km^{2} (0.68 sq mi)
- Elevation: 219.7 m (721 ft)

Population (2020)
  - Total: 42
  - Density: 24/km^{2} (62/sq mi)
- Postal code: 8341

Gorenjci pri Adlešičih (pronounced [ɡɔˈɾeːntsi pɾi ˈaːdlɛʃitʃix]; German: Gorenze) is a settlement on the left bank of the Kolpa River south of Adlešiči in the Municipality of Črnomelj in the White Carniola area of southeastern Slovenia. The area is part of the traditional region of Lower Carniola and is now included in the Southeast Slovenia Statistical Region.

== Name ==
The name of the settlement was changed from Gorenjci to Gorenjci pri Adlešičih in 1953. In the past the German name was Gorenze.
