= Nova Lipa, Črnomelj =

Nova Lipa
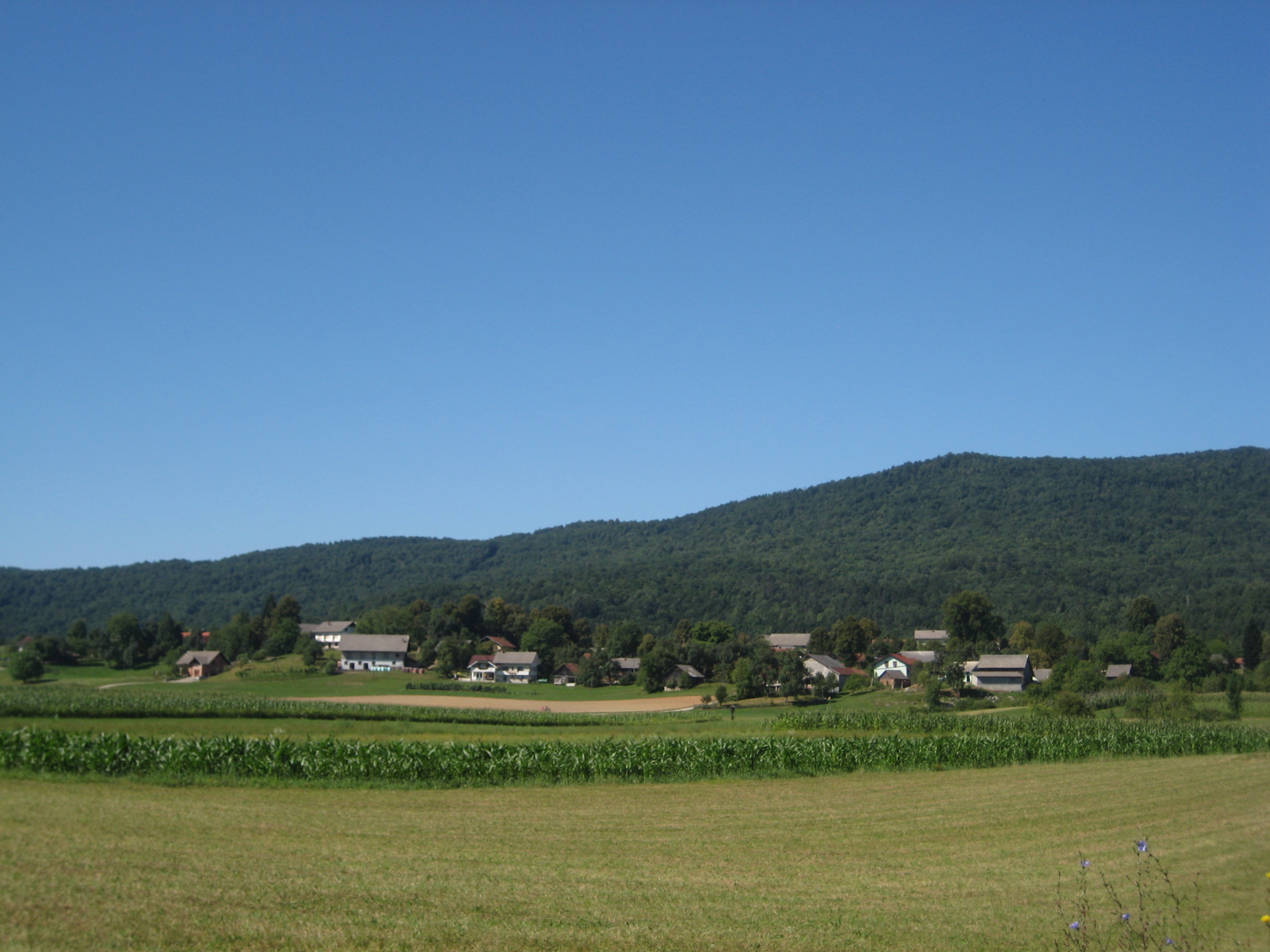

- Location in Slovenia
- Coordinates: 45°28′23″N 15°12′21.22″E
- Country: Slovenia
- Traditional region: White Carniola
- Statistical region: Southeast Slovenia
- Municipality: Črnomelj

Area
  - Total: 3.72 km^{2} (1.44 sq mi)
- Elevation: 177.2 m (581 ft)

Population (2020)
  - Total: 86
  - Density: 23/km^{2} (60/sq mi)
- Postal code: 8344

Nova Lipa (pronounced [ˈnɔːʋa ˈliːpa]; German: Neulinden) is a village northwest of Vinica in the Municipality of Črnomelj in the White Carniola area of southeastern Slovenia. The area is part of the traditional region of Lower Carniola and is now included in the Southeast Slovenia Statistical Region.

There is a small 17th-century church in the settlement. It is dedicated to the Holy Spirit (Slovene: Sveti Duh) and belongs to the Parish of Vinica. The main altar dates to the mid-18th century and was renovated in 1889.
