= Vranoviči =

- Location in Slovenia
- Coordinates: 45°36′7.98″N 15°14′4.92″E
- Country: Slovenia
- Traditional region: White Carniola
- Statistical region: Southeast Slovenia
- Municipality: Črnomelj

Area
  - Total: 2.62 km^{2} (1.01 sq mi)
- Elevation: 149 m (489 ft)

Population (2020)
  - Total: 90
  - Density: 34/km^{2} (89/sq mi)
- Postal code: 8332

Vranoviči (pronounced [ˈwɾaːnɔʋitʃi]; German: Uranowitsch) is a settlement on the left bank of the Lahinja River in the Municipality of Črnomelj in the White Carniola area of southeastern Slovenia. The railway line from Črnomelj to Metlika runs alongside the main road through the settlement. The area is part of the traditional region of Lower Carniola and is now included in the Southeast Slovenia Statistical Region.
