= Dečina =

- Location in Slovenia
- Coordinates: 45°31′20.63″N 15°18′39.76″E
- Country: Slovenia
- Traditional region: White Carniola
- Statistical region: Southeast Slovenia
- Municipality: Črnomelj

Area
  - Total: 0.43 km^{2} (0.17 sq mi)
- Elevation: 212.6 m (698 ft)

Population (2020)
  - Total: 2
  - Density: 4.7/km^{2} (12/sq mi)
- Postal code: 8341

Dečina (pronounced [ˈdeːtʃina]) is a small settlement on the left bank of the Kolpa River in the Municipality of Črnomelj in the White Carniola area of southeastern Slovenia. The area is part of the traditional region of Lower Carniola and is now included in the Southeast Slovenia Statistical Region.
