= Stražnji Vrh =

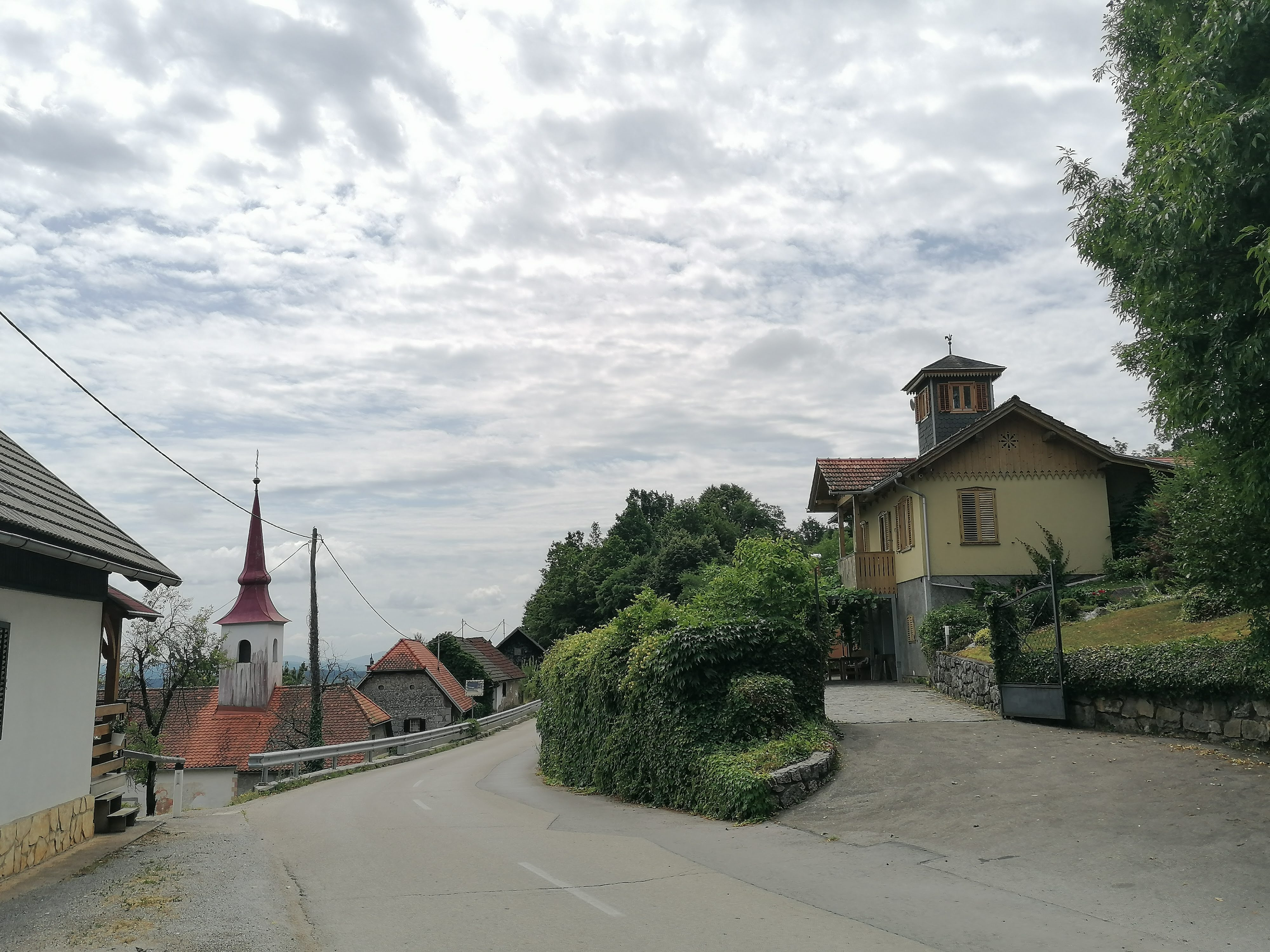

- Location in Slovenia
- Coordinates: 45°34′45.29″N 15°8′25.06″E
- Country: Slovenia
- Traditional region: White Carniola
- Statistical region: Southeast Slovenia
- Municipality: Črnomelj

Area
  - Total: 2.38 km^{2} (0.92 sq mi)
- Elevation: 315 m (1,033 ft)

Population (2020)
  - Total: 165
  - Density: 69.3/km^{2} (180/sq mi)
- Postal code: 8340

Stražnji Vrh (pronounced [ˈstɾaːʒnji ˈʋəɾx]; German: Straßenberg) is a settlement west of Črnomelj in the White Carniola area of southeastern Slovenia. The area is part of the traditional region of Lower Carniola and is now included in the Southeast Slovenia Statistical Region.

== Church ==
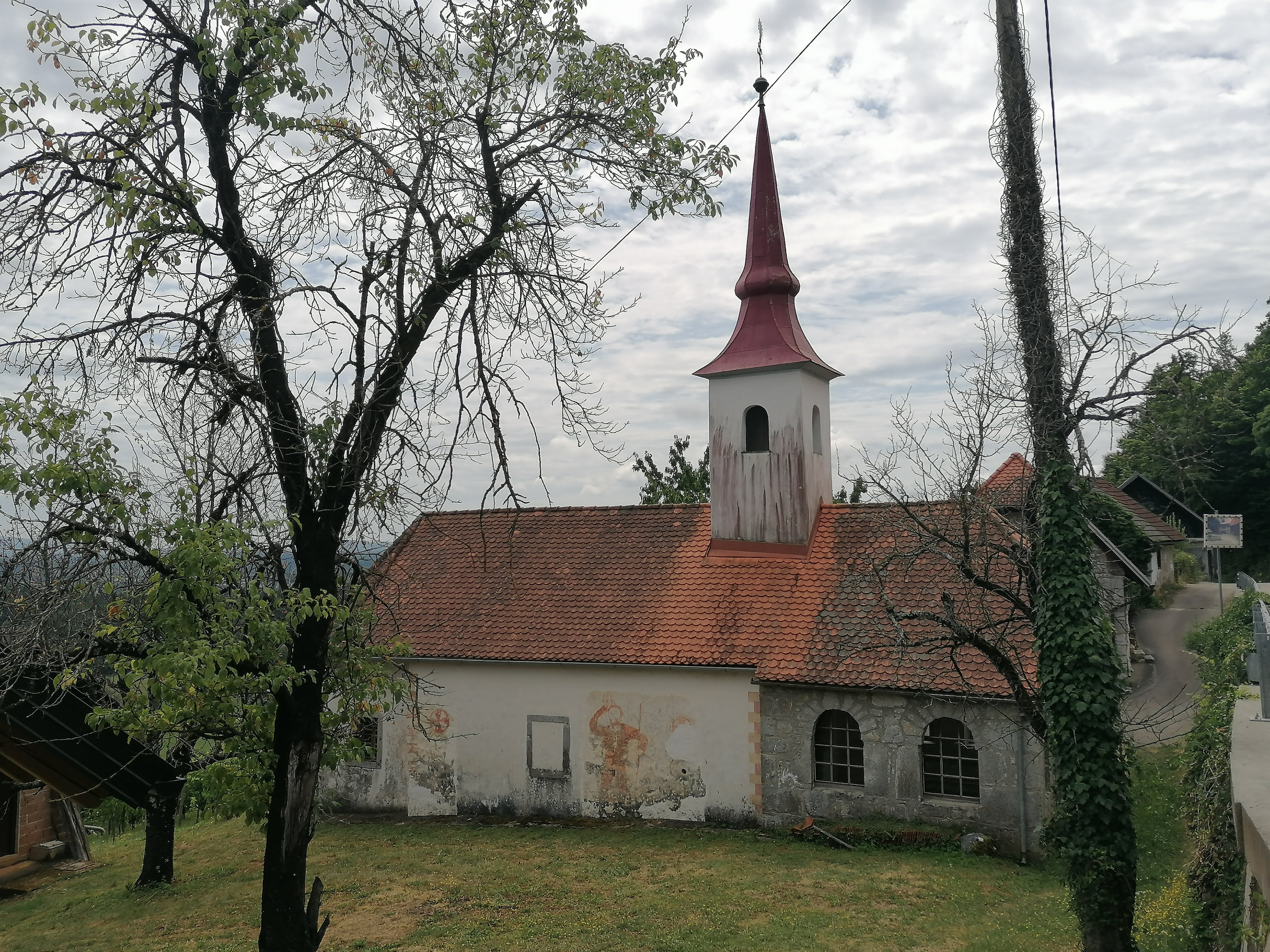
Church

The local church is dedicated to Saint Nicholas (Slovene: sveti Miklavž) and belongs to the Parish of Črnomelj. It is a small Romanesque church that was refurbished in the Baroque style in the 17th century.
