= Čudno Selo =

- Location in Slovenia
- Coordinates: 45°33′54.93″N 15°13′22.86″E
- Country: Slovenia
- Traditional region: White Carniola
- Statistical region: Southeast Slovenia
- Municipality: Črnomelj

Area
  - Total: 2.27 km^{2} (0.88 sq mi)
- Elevation: 178.7 m (586 ft)

Population (2020)
  - Total: 101
  - Density: 44.5/km^{2} (115/sq mi)
- Postal code: 8340

Čudno Selo (pronounced [ˈtʃuːdnɔ ˈsɛːlɔ]; Slovene: Čudno selo; German: Tschudnofeld) is a settlement on the right bank of the Lahinja River in the Municipality of Črnomelj in the White Carniola area of southeastern Slovenia. The area is part of the traditional region of Lower Carniola and is now included in the Southeast Slovenia Statistical Region.

== Name ==
The name Čudno selo has been explained as derived from the word čud 'giant'. If so, the name would literally mean 'giant's village'. In the past, the village was known as Tschudnofeld in German.
