= Špeharji =

- Location in Slovenia
- Coordinates: 45°26′51.7″N 15°8′11.9″E
- Country: Slovenia
- Traditional region: White Carniola
- Statistical region: Southeast Slovenia
- Municipality: Črnomelj

Area
  - Total: 0.48 km^{2} (0.19 sq mi)
- Elevation: 277.9 m (912 ft)

Population (2020)
  - Total: 12
  - Density: 25/km^{2} (65/sq mi)
- Postal code: 8344

Špeharji (pronounced [ʃpɛˈxaːɾji]; German: Neschawas) is a small settlement on the left bank of the Kolpa River in the Municipality of Črnomelj in the White Carniola area of southeastern Slovenia. The area is part of the traditional region of Lower Carniola and is now included in the Southeast Slovenia Statistical Region.

The small church in the settlement is dedicated to the Holy Trinity (Slovene: Sveta Trojica) and belongs to the Parish of Sinji Vrh. It dates to the 17th century.
