= Kot ob Kolpi =

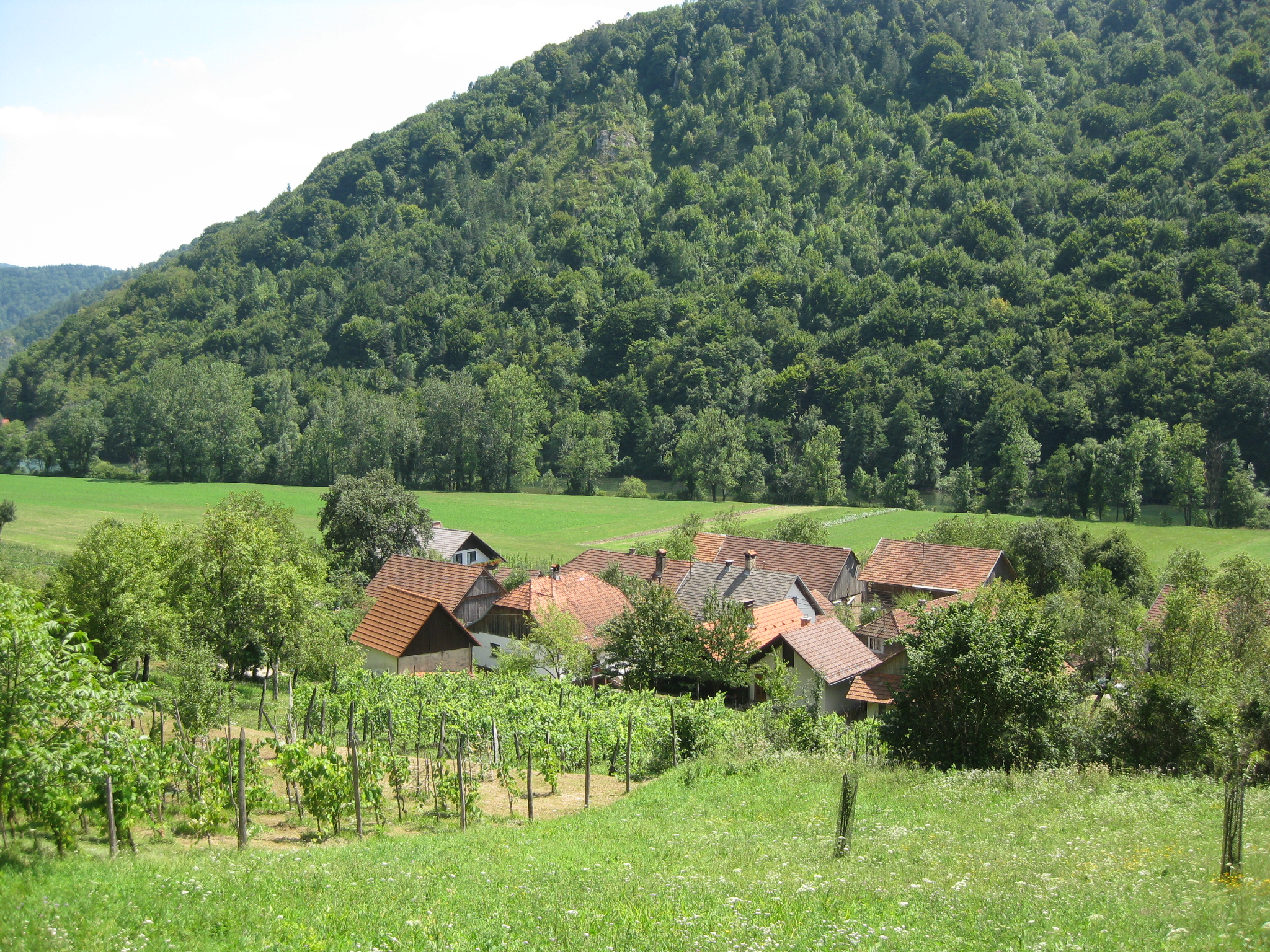

- Location in Slovenia
- Coordinates: 45°29′22.88″N 15°4′10.47″E
- Country: Slovenia
- Traditional region: White Carniola
- Statistical region: Southeast Slovenia
- Municipality: Črnomelj

Area
  - Total: 0.19 km^{2} (0.073 sq mi)
- Elevation: 196.6 m (645 ft)

Population (2020)
  - Total: 1
  - Density: 5.3/km^{2} (14/sq mi)
- Postal code: 8342

Kot ob Kolpi (pronounced [ˈkoːt ɔp ˈkoːlpi]; German: Winkel) is a small settlement on the left bank of the Kolpa River south of Stari Trg ob Kolpi in the Municipality of Črnomelj in the White Carniola area of southeastern Slovenia. The area is part of the traditional region of Lower Carniola and is now included in the Southeast Slovenia Statistical Region.

== Name ==
The name of the settlement was changed from Kot to Kot ob Kolpi in 1953.
