= Dalnje Njive =

- Location in Slovenia
- Coordinates: 45°26′3.66″N 15°9′26.32″E
- Country: Slovenia
- Traditional region: White Carniola
- Statistical region: Southeast Slovenia
- Municipality: Črnomelj

Area
  - Total: 2.4 km^{2} (0.93 sq mi)
- Elevation: 395.6 m (1,298 ft)

Population (2020)
  - Total: 18
  - Density: 7.5/km^{2} (19/sq mi)
- Postal code: 8344

Dalnje Njive (pronounced [ˈdaːlnjɛ ˈnjiːʋɛ]; German: Sabetich) is a small settlement in the hills above the left bank of the Kolpa River in the Municipality of Črnomelj in the White Carniola area of southeastern Slovenia. The area is part of the traditional region of Lower Carniola and is now included in the Southeast Slovenia Statistical Region.

== Church ==
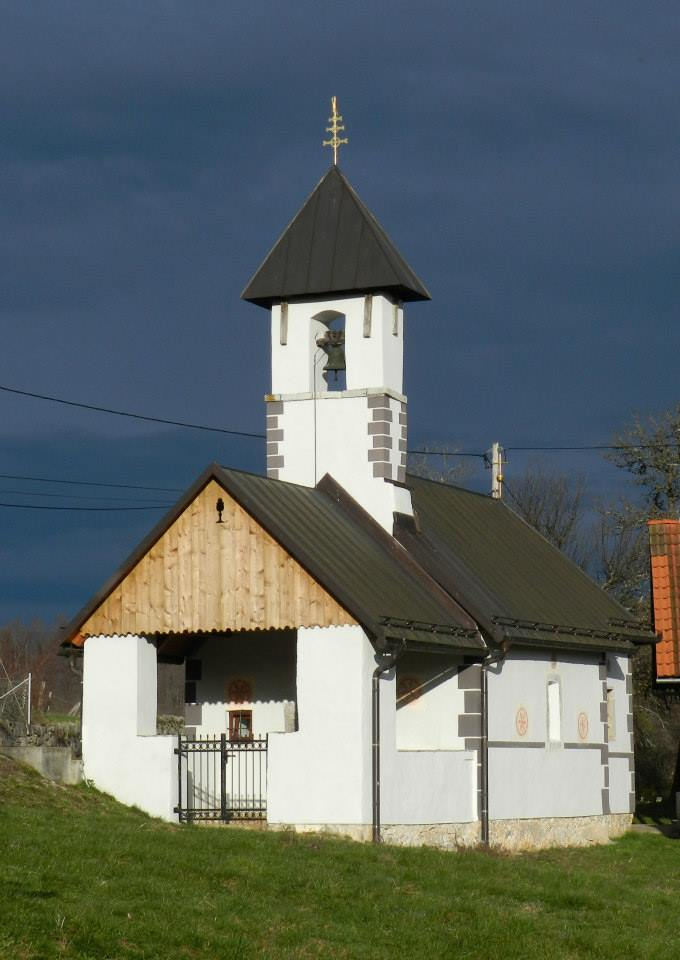
Saint Mark's Church

A small church in the settlement is dedicated to Saint Mark and belongs to the Parish of Sinji Vrh. It was built in 1737 and renovated in 1857 after most of the village burned down in a fire.
