= Sela pri Dragatušu =

- Location in Slovenia
- Coordinates: 45°31′52.2″N 15°10′6.53″E
- Country: Slovenia
- Traditional region: White Carniola
- Statistical region: Southeast Slovenia
- Municipality: Črnomelj

Area
  - Total: 1.16 km^{2} (0.45 sq mi)
- Elevation: 154.6 m (507 ft)

Population (2020)
  - Total: 80
  - Density: 69/km^{2} (180/sq mi)
- Postal code: 8343

Sela pri Dragatušu (pronounced [ˈseːla pɾi dɾaɡaˈtuːʃu]; in older sources also Sela pri Turnu, German: Sela bei Golek) is a settlement north of Dragatuš in the Municipality of Črnomelj in the White Carniola area of southeastern Slovenia. The area is part of the traditional region of Lower Carniola and is now included in the Southeast Slovenia Statistical Region.
