= Dolenji Suhor pri Vinici =

- Location in Slovenia
- Coordinates: 45°29′40.85″N 15°11′24.85″E
- Country: Slovenia
- Traditional region: White Carniola
- Statistical region: Southeast Slovenia
- Municipality: Črnomelj

Area
  - Total: 1.38 km^{2} (0.53 sq mi)
- Elevation: 158.6 m (520 ft)

Population (2020)
  - Total: 41
  - Density: 30/km^{2} (77/sq mi)
- Postal code: 8343

Dolenji Suhor pri Vinici (pronounced [dɔˈleːnji ˈsuːxɔɾ pɾi ˈʋiːnitsi]; German: Untersuchor) is a settlement halfway between Dragatuš and Vinica in the Municipality of Črnomelj in the White Carniola area of southeastern Slovenia. The area is part of the traditional region of Lower Carniola and is now included in the Southeast Slovenia Statistical Region.

== Name ==
The name of the settlement was changed from Dolenji Suhor to Dolenji Suhor pri Vinici in 1953. In the past the German name was Untersuchor.
