= Pusti Gradec =

- Location in Slovenia
- Coordinates: 45°30′59.86″N 15°11′42.17″E
- Country: Slovenia
- Traditional region: White Carniola
- Statistical region: Southeast Slovenia
- Municipality: Črnomelj

Area
  - Total: 0.86 km^{2} (0.33 sq mi)
- Elevation: 161.8 m (531 ft)

Population (2020)
  - Total: 29
  - Density: 34/km^{2} (87/sq mi)
- Postal code: 8343

Pusti Gradec (pronounced [ˈpuːsti ˈɡɾaːdəts], often Pusti Gradac, German: Oedengraz) is a small settlement east of Dragatuš in the Municipality of Črnomelj in the White Carniola area of southeastern Slovenia. The area is part of the traditional region of Lower Carniola and is now included in the Southeast Slovenia Statistical Region.

The local church is dedicated to All Saints and belongs to the parish of Dragatuš. It is a single-naved building with a three-sided apse. The date 1638 appears on its portal.
