= Jerneja Vas =

- Location in Slovenia
- Coordinates: 45°33′4.82″N 15°9′3.99″E
- Country: Slovenia
- Traditional region: White Carniola
- Statistical region: Southeast Slovenia
- Municipality: Črnomelj

Area
  - Total: 1.59 km^{2} (0.61 sq mi)
- Elevation: 148.8 m (488 ft)

Population (2020)
  - Total: 62
  - Density: 39/km^{2} (100/sq mi)
- Postal code: 8340

Jerneja Vas (pronounced [jɛɾˈnɛːja ˈʋaːs] or [jɛɾˈneːja ˈʋaːs]; Slovene: Jerneja vas, German: Jerneisdorf) is a small settlement southwest of the town of Črnomelj in the White Carniola area of southeastern Slovenia. The area is part of the traditional region of Lower Carniola and is now included in the Southeast Slovenia Statistical Region.
