= Bedenj =

- Location in Slovenia
- Coordinates: 45°32′14.72″N 15°16′36.98″E
- Country: Slovenia
- Traditional region: White Carniola
- Statistical region: Southeast Slovenia
- Municipality: Črnomelj

Area
  - Total: 1.4 km^{2} (0.54 sq mi)
- Elevation: 199.1 m (653 ft)

Population (2020)
  - Total: 64
  - Density: 46/km^{2} (120/sq mi)
- Postal code: 8341

Bedenj (pronounced [ˈbədən]; German: Weidendorf) is a small settlement on road from Črnomelj to Adlešiči in the White Carniola area of southeastern Slovenia. The area is part of the traditional region of Lower Carniola and is now included in the Southeast Slovenia Statistical Region.

Bedenj is the ancestral home of the American singer, musician, songwriter, and actor "Weird Al" Yankovic on his paternal grandfather's side, who was born there.
