= Draga pri Sinjem Vrhu =

- Location in Slovenia
- Coordinates: 45°26′40.83″N 15°10′22.57″E
- Country: Slovenia
- Traditional region: White Carniola
- Statistical region: Southeast Slovenia
- Municipality: Črnomelj

Area
  - Total: 1.34 km^{2} (0.52 sq mi)
- Elevation: 242.8 m (797 ft)

Population (2020)
  - Total: 16
  - Density: 12/km^{2} (31/sq mi)
- Postal code: 8344

Draga pri Sinjem Vrhu (pronounced [ˈdɾaːɡa pɾi ˈsiːnjɛɱ ˈʋəɾxu]) is a small settlement south of Sinji Vrh in the Municipality of Črnomelj in the White Carniola area of southeastern Slovenia. The area is part of the traditional region of Lower Carniola and is now included in the Southeast Slovenia Statistical Region.

== Name ==
The name of the settlement was changed from Draga to Draga pri Sinjem Vrhu (literally, 'Draga near Sinji Vrh') in 1955. The name Draga is derived from the Slovene common noun draga 'small, narrow valley', referring to the geographical location of the settlement.
