= Hrast pri Vinici =

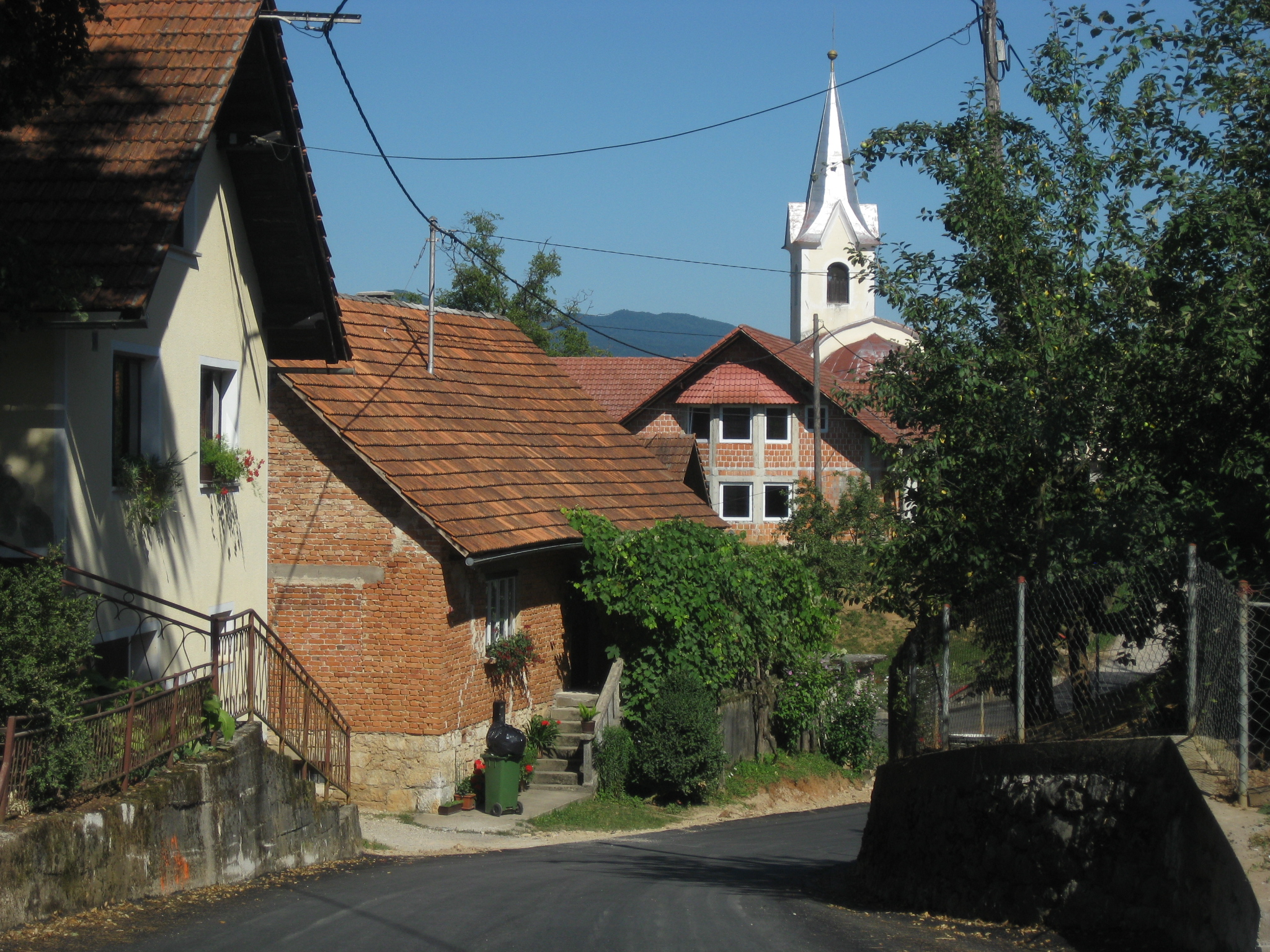

- Location in Slovenia
- Coordinates: 45°28′46.5″N 15°13′38.21″E
- Country: Slovenia
- Traditional region: White Carniola
- Statistical region: Southeast Slovenia
- Municipality: Črnomelj

Area
  - Total: 6.29 km^{2} (2.43 sq mi)
- Elevation: 221.9 m (728 ft)

Population (2020)
  - Total: 168
  - Density: 26.7/km^{2} (69.2/sq mi)
- Postal code: 8344

Hrast pri Vinici (pronounced [ˈxɾaːst pɾi ˈʋiːnitsi]; German: Hrast bei Weinitz) is a village north of Vinica in the Municipality of Črnomelj in the White Carniola area of southeastern Slovenia. The area is part of the traditional region of Lower Carniola and is now included in the Southeast Slovenia Statistical Region.

The local church is dedicated to Saint Roch (Slovene: sveti Rok) and belongs to the Parish of Vinica. It was first mentioned in written documents dating to 1526, but owes its current Baroque look to a major remodelling in the 18th century. The main altar dates to the 17th century, but was renovated and remodelled in 1825 and again in 1889.
