= Gorenja Podgora =

- Location in Slovenia
- Coordinates: 45°32′0.97″N 15°4′0.07″E
- Country: Slovenia
- Traditional region: White Carniola
- Statistical region: Southeast Slovenia
- Municipality: Črnomelj

Area
  - Total: 1.92 km^{2} (0.74 sq mi)
- Elevation: 400.3 m (1,313 ft)

Population (2020)
  - Total: 25
  - Density: 13/km^{2} (34/sq mi)
- Postal code: 8342

Gorenja Podgora (pronounced [ɡɔˈɾeːnja pɔdˈɡɔːɾa]; German: Oberberg) is a settlement in the hills southwest of Črnomelj in the White Carniola area of southeastern Slovenia. The area is part of the traditional region of Lower Carniola and is now included in the Southeast Slovenia Statistical Region.
