= Perudina =

- Location in Slovenia
- Coordinates: 45°28′30.87″N 15°14′19.12″E
- Country: Slovenia
- Traditional region: White Carniola
- Statistical region: Southeast Slovenia
- Municipality: Črnomelj

Area
  - Total: 2.59 km^{2} (1.00 sq mi)
- Elevation: 239.9 m (787 ft)

Population (2020)
  - Total: 57
  - Density: 22/km^{2} (57/sq mi)
- Postal code: 8344

Perudina (pronounced [pɛˈɾuːdina]) is a settlement 2.5 km north of Vinica in the Municipality of Črnomelj in the White Carniola area of southeastern Slovenia. The entire area is part of the traditional region of Lower Carniola and is now included in the Southeast Slovenia Statistical Region.
