= Šipek, Črnomelj =

Šipek
- Location in Slovenia
- Coordinates: 45°31′12.48″N 15°11′52.35″E
- Country: Slovenia
- Traditional region: White Carniola
- Statistical region: Southeast Slovenia
- Municipality: Črnomelj

Area
  - Total: 0.79 km^{2} (0.31 sq mi)
- Elevation: 158.9 m (521 ft)

Population (2020)
  - Total: 22
  - Density: 28/km^{2} (72/sq mi)
- Postal code: 8343

Šipek (pronounced [ˈʃiːpək]; German: Schipek) is a small settlement on the right bank of the Lahinja River east of Dragatuš in the Municipality of Črnomelj in the White Carniola area of southeastern Slovenia. The area is part of the traditional region of Lower Carniola and is now included in the Southeast Slovenia Statistical Region.
