= Mihelja Vas =

- Location in Slovenia
- Coordinates: 45°36′56.06″N 15°9′42.94″E
- Country: Slovenia
- Traditional region: White Carniola
- Statistical region: Southeast Slovenia
- Municipality: Črnomelj

Area
  - Total: 2.88 km^{2} (1.11 sq mi)
- Elevation: 218.2 m (716 ft)

Population (2020)
  - Total: 43
  - Density: 15/km^{2} (39/sq mi)
- Postal code: 8340

Mihelja Vas (pronounced [miˈxeːlja ˈʋa:s]; Slovene: Mihelja vas) is a settlement north of the town of Črnomelj in the White Carniola area of southeastern Slovenia. The area is part of the traditional region of Lower Carniola and is now included in the Southeast Slovenia Statistical Region.

An archaeological field survey in 2000 and 2001 revealed the existence of a prehistoric as well as Roman settlement in the area.
