= Podlog, Črnomelj =

Podlog
- Location in Slovenia
- Coordinates: 45°31′33.26″N 15°11′23.39″E
- Country: Slovenia
- Traditional region: White Carniola
- Statistical region: Southeast Slovenia
- Municipality: Črnomelj

Area
  - Total: 0.93 km^{2} (0.36 sq mi)
- Elevation: 162.8 m (534 ft)

Population (2020)
  - Total: 61
  - Density: 66/km^{2} (170/sq mi)
- Postal code: 8343

Podlog (pronounced [pɔˈdloːk]) is a small village east of Dragatuš on the left bank of the Lahinja River in the Municipality of Črnomelj in the White Carniola area of southeastern Slovenia. The area is part of the traditional region of Lower Carniola and is now included in the Southeast Slovenia Statistical Region.
