= Podklanec, Črnomelj =

Podklanec
- Location in Slovenia
- Coordinates: 45°28′2.5″N 15°15′41.41″E
- Country: Slovenia
- Traditional region: White Carniola
- Statistical region: Southeast Slovenia
- Municipality: Črnomelj

Area
  - Total: 9.27 km^{2} (3.58 sq mi)
- Elevation: 205.7 m (675 ft)

Population (2020)
  - Total: 95
  - Density: 10/km^{2} (27/sq mi)
- Postal code: 8344

Podklanec (pronounced [pɔtˈklaːnəts]) is a settlement on the left bank of the Kolpa River in the Municipality of Črnomelj in the White Carniola area of southeastern Slovenia. The area is part of the traditional region of Lower Carniola and is now included in the Southeast Slovenia Statistical Region.

The local church is dedicated to Saint Joseph and belongs to the Parish of Vinica. It dates to the 17th century.
