= Belčji Vrh =

- Location in Slovenia
- Coordinates: 45°29′52.71″N 15°12′34.45″E
- Country: Slovenia
- Traditional region: White Carniola
- Statistical region: Southeast Slovenia
- Municipality: Črnomelj

Area
  - Total: 1.56 km^{2} (0.60 sq mi)
- Elevation: 188.4 m (618 ft)

Population (2020)
  - Total: 91
  - Density: 58/km^{2} (150/sq mi)
- Postal code: 8343
- Climate: Cfb

Belčji Vrh (pronounced [ˈbeːltʃji ˈʋəɾx]; German: Weltschberg) is a village south of the town of Črnomelj in the White Carniola area of southeastern Slovenia. The area is part of the traditional region of Lower Carniola and is now included in the Southeast Slovenia Statistical Region.

== Name ==
Belčji Vrh was attested in historical documents as Polcz in 1458, Pälcz in 1464, and Wirlsperg in 1468, among other spellings.

== Church ==
The local church is dedicated to Saint Helena and belongs to the Parish of Dragatuš. It was first mentioned in written documents dating to 1526, but was refurbished in the Baroque style in the mid-18th century. The main altar dates to the second half of the 19th century.
