= Dolenjci =

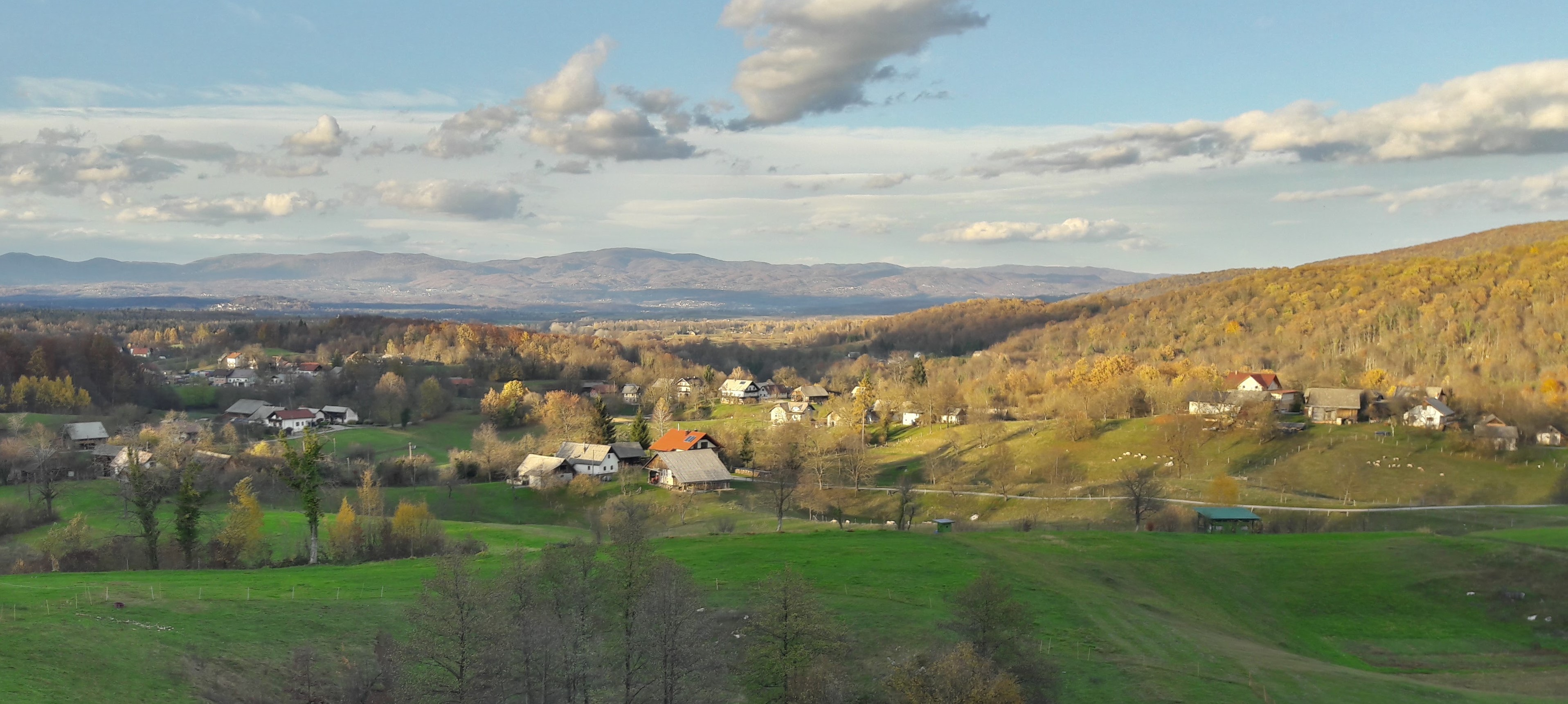

- Location in Slovenia
- Coordinates: 45°32′1.25″N 15°17′54.35″E
- Country: Slovenia
- Traditional region: White Carniola
- Statistical region: Southeast Slovenia
- Municipality: Črnomelj

Area
  - Total: 1.75 km^{2} (0.68 sq mi)
- Elevation: 188.3 m (618 ft)

Population (2020)
  - Total: 89
  - Density: 51/km^{2} (130/sq mi)
- Postal code: 8341

Dolenjci (pronounced [dɔˈleːntsi]) is a settlement on the left bank of the Kolpa River in the Municipality of Črnomelj in the White Carniola area of southeastern Slovenia. The area is part of the traditional region of White Carniola and is now included in the Southeast Slovenia Statistical Region.

The local church, built on Big Plešivica Hill (Slovene: Velika Plešivica) west of the settlement, is dedicated to Mary Magdalene and belongs to the Parish of Adlešiči. It was probably built in the early 17th century and was restyled and extended in 1846. The main altar dates to the late 19th century.
