= Gorica, Črnomelj =

Gorica
- Location in Slovenia
- Coordinates: 45°26′43.84″N 15°9′15.39″E
- Country: Slovenia
- Traditional region: White Carniola
- Statistical region: Southeast Slovenia
- Municipality: Črnomelj

Area
  - Total: 2.33 km^{2} (0.90 sq mi)
- Elevation: 466.4 m (1,530 ft)

Population (2020)
  - Total: 9
  - Density: 3.9/km^{2} (10/sq mi)
- Postal code: 8344

Gorica (pronounced [ɡɔˈɾiːtsa]; German: Bergel) is a small village southwest of Sinji Vrh in the Municipality of Črnomelj in the White Carniola area of southeastern Slovenia. The area is part of the traditional region of Lower Carniola and is now included in the Southeast Slovenia Statistical Region.

The local church, built outside the settlement to the east, is dedicated to John the Baptist and belongs to the Parish of Sinji Vrh. It was built in the first half of the 19th century on the site of an earlier building.
