= Svibnik =

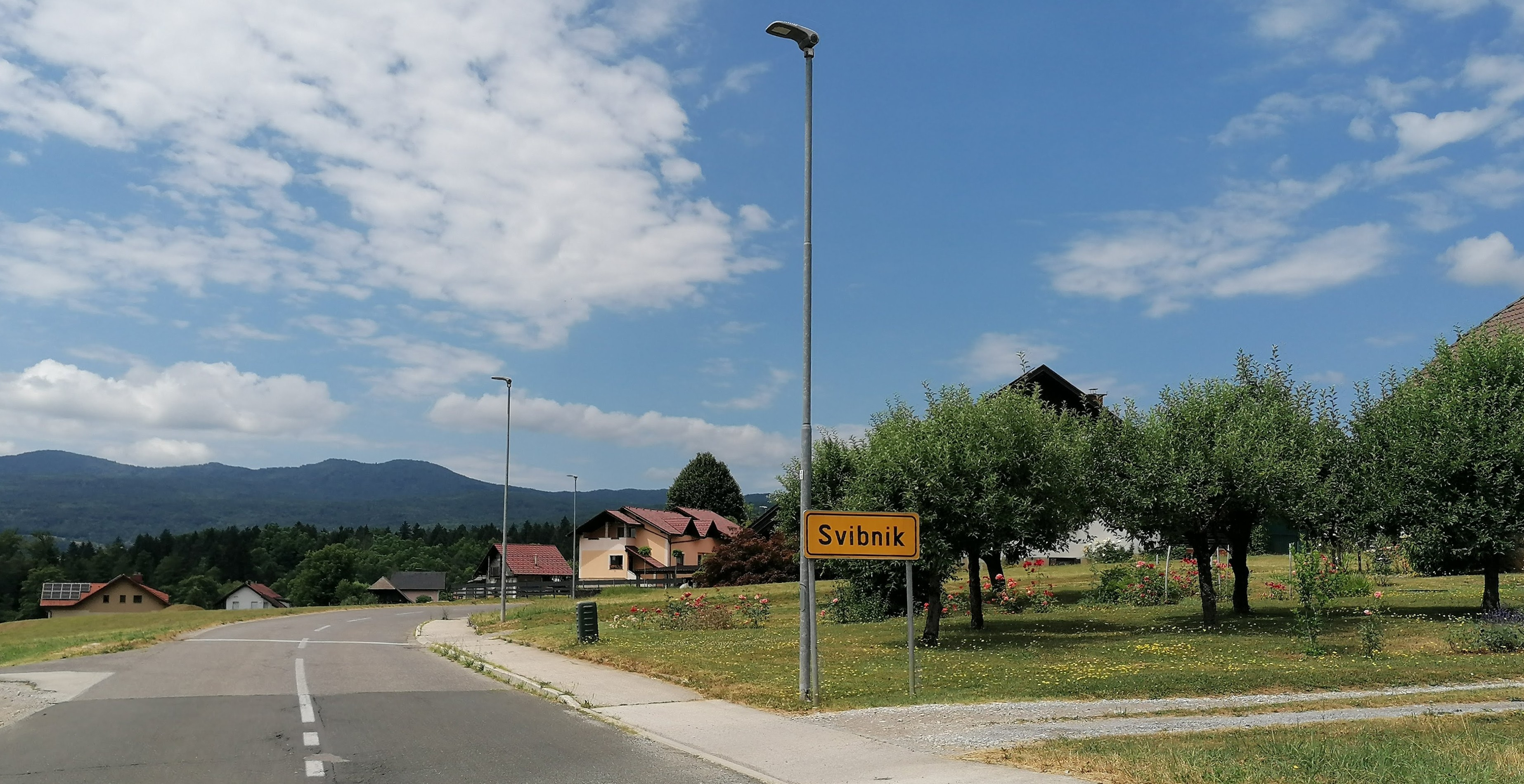

- Location in Slovenia
- Coordinates: 45°31′20.63″N 15°18′39.76″E
- Country: Slovenia
- Traditional region: White Carniola
- Statistical region: Southeast Slovenia
- Municipality: Črnomelj

Area
  - Total: 1.11 km^{2} (0.43 sq mi)
- Elevation: 212.6 m (698 ft)

Population (2020)
  - Total: 102
  - Density: 91.9/km^{2} (238/sq mi)
- Postal code: 8341

Svibnik (pronounced [ˈsʋiːbnik]; German: Swibnik) is a settlement immediately west of Črnomelj in the White Carniola area of southeastern Slovenia. The area is part of the traditional region of Lower Carniola and is now included in the Southeast Slovenia Statistical Region.

== Name ==
The name Svibnik (and related names such as Svibno) are derived from the Slovene common noun sviba 'dogwood', referring to the local vegetation. The settlement was known as Swibnik in German in the past.

== History ==
During the Second World War, on 26 July 1942 Italian forces based in Črnomelj burned eight houses and 21 farm buildings in Svibnik. In 1943 and 1944 the Partisans operated an elementary school in the settlement.
