= Pribinci =

- Location in Slovenia
- Coordinates: 45°31′55.11″N 15°15′35.58″E
- Country: Slovenia
- Traditional region: White Carniola
- Statistical region: Southeast Slovenia
- Municipality: Črnomelj

Area
  - Total: 4.32 km^{2} (1.67 sq mi)
- Elevation: 205.4 m (674 ft)

Population (2020)
  - Total: 41
  - Density: 9.5/km^{2} (25/sq mi)
- Postal code: 8341

Pribinci (pronounced [ˈpɾiːbintsi]) is a settlement southeast of the town of Črnomelj in the White Carniola area of southeastern Slovenia. The area is part of the traditional region of Lower Carniola and is now included in the Southeast Slovenia Statistical Region.
