= Jankoviči =

- Location in Slovenia
- Coordinates: 45°32′17.86″N 15°17′18.49″E
- Country: Slovenia
- Traditional region: White Carniola
- Statistical region: Southeast Slovenia
- Municipality: Črnomelj

Area
  - Total: 1.73 km^{2} (0.67 sq mi)
- Elevation: 204.4 m (671 ft)

Population (2020)
  - Total: 47
  - Density: 27/km^{2} (70/sq mi)
- Postal code: 8341

Jankoviči (pronounced [janˈkɔːʋitʃi] or [janˈkoːʋitʃi]) is a settlement on the main road from Črnomelj to Adlešiči in the White Carniola area of southeastern Slovenia. It is made up of the hamlets of Rim, Šoštariči, Karaman, and Jankoviči. The area is part of the traditional region of Lower Carniola and is now included in the Southeast Slovenia Statistical Region.
