= Močile, Črnomelj =

Močile
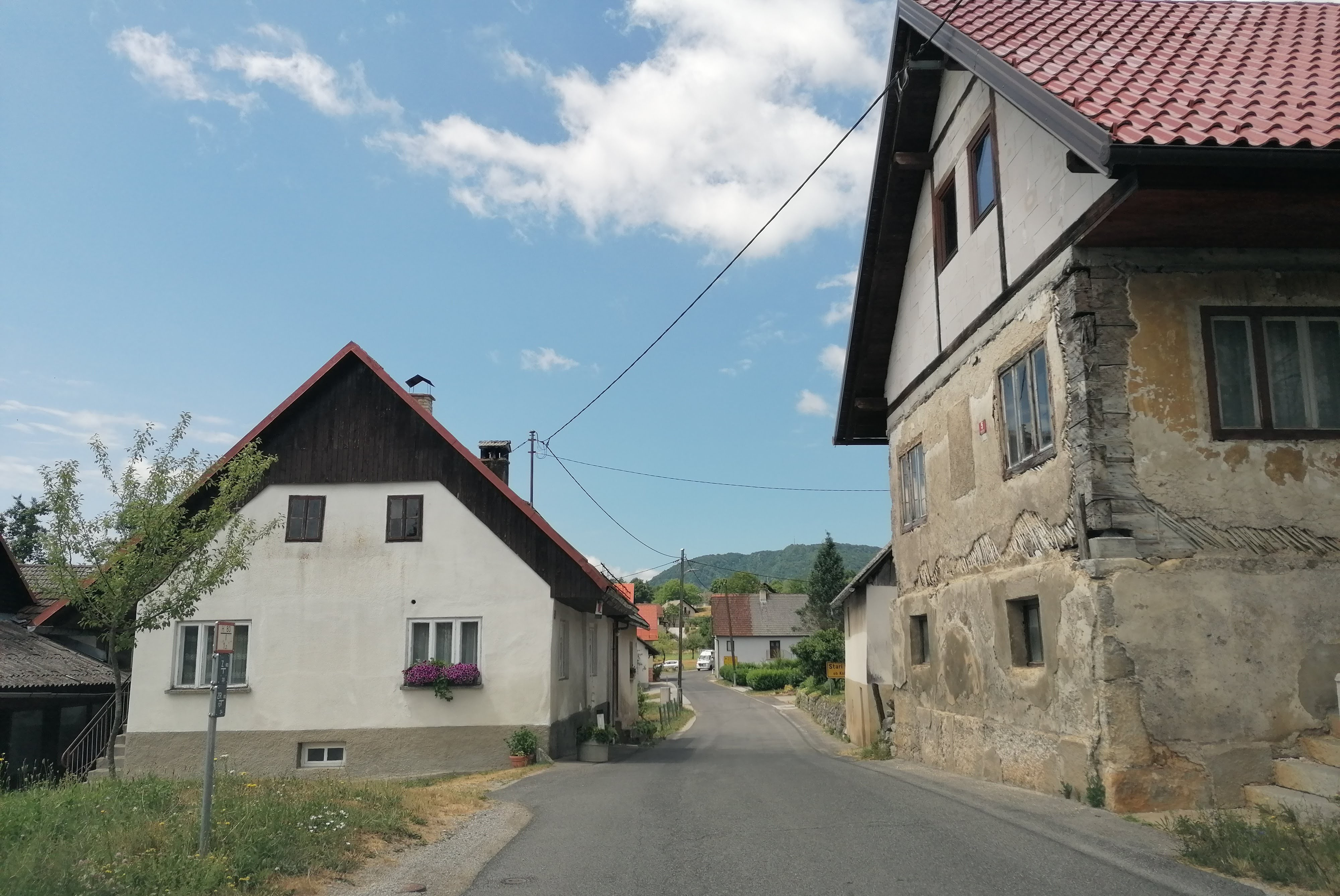

- Location in Slovenia
- Coordinates: 45°29′47.8″N 15°4′51.04″E
- Country: Slovenia
- Traditional region: White Carniola
- Statistical region: Southeast Slovenia
- Municipality: Črnomelj

Area
  - Total: 13.31 km^{2} (5.14 sq mi)
- Elevation: 378.9 m (1,243 ft)

Population (2020)
  - Total: 12
  - Density: 0.90/km^{2} (2.3/sq mi)
- Postal code: 8342

Močile (pronounced [mɔˈtʃiːlɛ]) is a small settlement north of Stari Trg ob Kolpi in the Municipality of Črnomelj in the White Carniola area of southeastern Slovenia. The area is part of the traditional region of Lower Carniola and is now included in the Southeast Slovenia Statistical Region.
