= Breg pri Sinjem Vrhu =

- Location in Slovenia
- Coordinates: 45°26′47.03″N 15°7′51.96″E
- Country: Slovenia
- Traditional region: White Carniola
- Statistical region: Southeast Slovenia
- Municipality: Črnomelj

Area
  - Total: 0.59 km^{2} (0.23 sq mi)
- Elevation: 193.3 m (634 ft)

Population (2020)
  - Total: 2
  - Density: 3.4/km^{2} (8.8/sq mi)
- Postal code: 8344

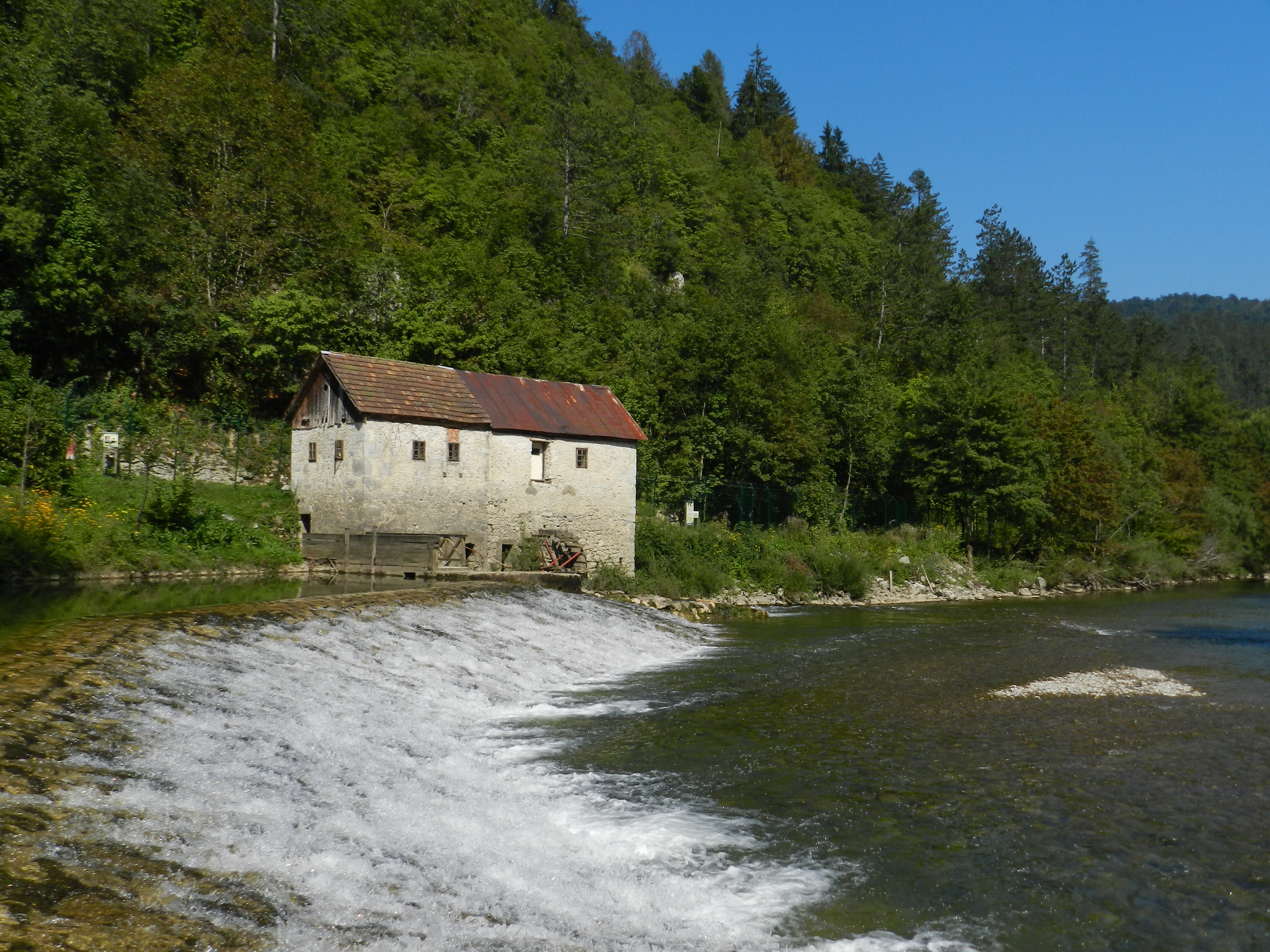
Water mill in Bregu pri Sinjem Vrhu

Breg pri Sinjem Vrhu (pronounced [ˈbɾeːk pɾi ˈsiːnjɛɱ ˈʋəɾxu]) is a small settlement on the left bank of the Kolpa River in the Municipality of Črnomelj in the White Carniola area of southeastern Slovenia. The area is part of the traditional region of Lower Carniola and is now included in the Southeast Slovenia Statistical Region.

== Name ==
The name of the settlement was changed from Breg to Breg pri Sinjem Vrhu in 1952.

== Sports ==
The Gorski Kotar Bike Tour, held annually since 2012, sometimes goes through Breg, such as in the first leg for 2024.
