= Romani people in Slovenia =

Ethnic group in Slovenia

Romane manusha andi Slovenia (Romani)
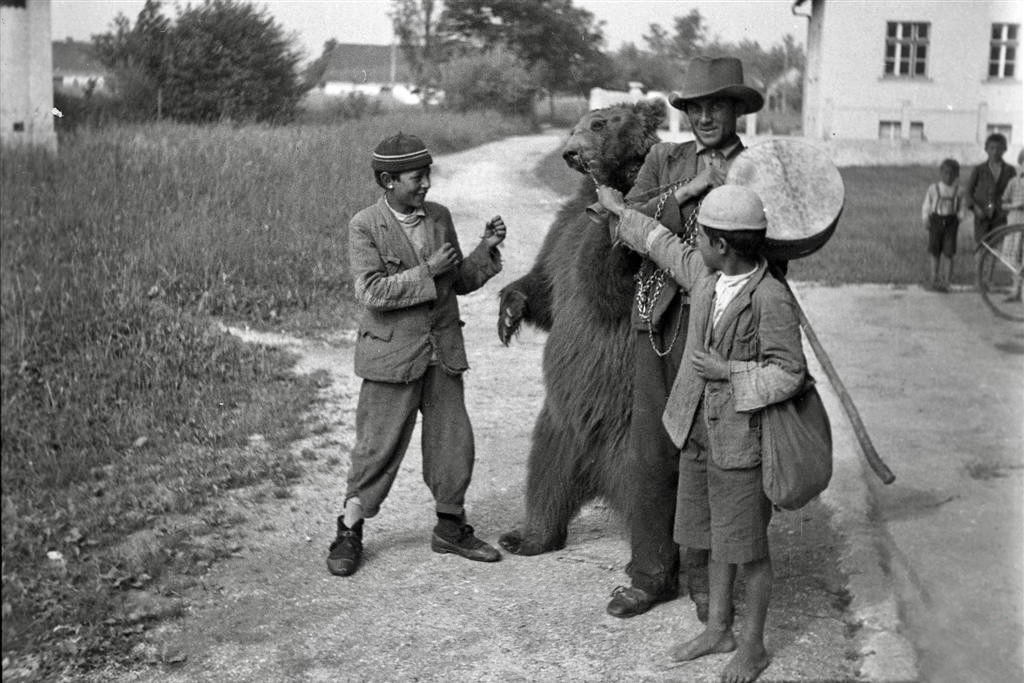

Total population
- 3,246 (2002)

Regions with significant populations
- Prekmurje region and Dolenjska region

Languages
- Balkan Romani, Italian, Slovene

Religion
- Roman Catholicism, Romani mythology

According to the 2002 census, there were 3,246 Romani individuals living in Slovenia. The Council of Europe has estimated that approximately 8,500 Romani people live in Slovenia (0.42% of the population). According to recent estimates, there are approximately 15,000 Romani in Slovenia, which constitutes 0.7% of the total Slovenian population. The Roma have been living in Slovenia since the 15th century.

Slovenian Roma live mainly in northeast Slovenia (the Prekmurje region) and southeast Slovenia (the regions of Lower Carniola, the Lower Sava Valley, and White Carniola), as well as in major towns such as Maribor, Velenje, Ljubljana, Celje, Jesenice, and Radovljica. The Sinti live mainly in Jesenice and Radovljica. According to the Local Self-Government Act (Slovene: Zako o lokalni samoupravi), there are 20 municipalities where the Roma have resided historically, i.e., they are indigenous: Beltinci, Cankova, Črenšovci, Črnomelj, Dobrovnik, Grosuplje, Kočevje, Krško, Kuzma, Lendava, Metlika, Murska Sobota, Novo Mesto, Puconci, Rogašovci, Semič, Šentjernej, Tišina, Trebnje, and Turnišče.

== Rights and status ==
The rights and the status of the Roma community are stipulated in The Roma Community in the Republic of Slovenia Act (Zakon o romskl skupnosti v Republiki Sloveniji). At the local level, the Roma are represented in the municipalities where they are indigenous by a municipal councillor and a working body monitoring the situtation of the Roma community. At the national level, the Roma are represented by the Council of the Roma Community of the Republic of Slovenia (Svet romske skupnosti Republike Slovenije) as the umbrella organisation of the Roma community.

== Demographics and living conditions ==
The Roma mostly live in various Roma settlements that range in size from a few houses with approximately 20 to 50 inhabitants to larger settlements with up to 1,100 inhabitants. Most of them are Catholic and in a disadvantaged social position. Particularly in southeast Slovenia, only a few Roma have jobs, many do not send their children to school, they are confined to ghettos with no social role, and there is an increasing number of thefts, burglaries, fights, and shootings. There are two main Romani language groups in Slovenia (the third smallest language group is the Roma from the former republics of Yugoslavia). The first is the language group of the Prekmurje Roma, which has many Hungarian words in its language. The second linguistic group is the Lower Carniola-White Carniola group.

== History ==
The Romani people originate from Northern India, presumably from the northwestern Indian states of Rajasthan and Punjab.

The first report of the Roma in the Slovenia region dates from 1453 and refers to a smith. During World War II, part of Slovenia was annexed to Germany and the Roma living there were taken to concentration camps.

During the Second World War, on 19 July 1942, the Partisan White Carniola Detachment took 61 Roma from Kanižarica. They were marched to Mavrlen, which had recently been emptied of its Gottschee German residents, held prisoner there for two days, and then murdered and buried in the Zagradec Mass Grave (Slovene: Grobišče Zagradec) southeast of the abandoned settlement of Gradec, now part of the settlement of Rožič Vrh. Altogether, around 200 Romani people of Slovenia were killed during the Second World War.

== Culture ==
In Slovenia, the Romani community holds a belief in vampires that appear ordinary yet possess a jellylike appearance, as they are said to have abandoned their bones in the grave. Roma TV So Vakeres is a television magazine program aimed at the Slovenian Roma community, produced by RTV Slovenija in the Romani language.

== See also ==
- India–Slovenia relations
