= Katka Zupančič =

Slovenian-American poet and author

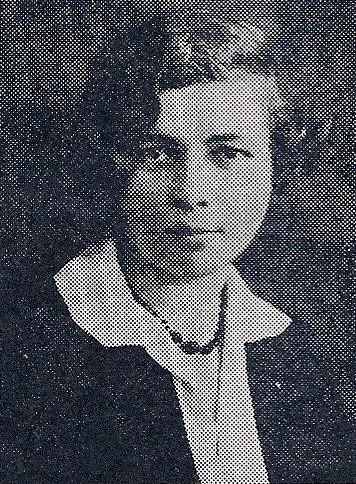
- Born: Katka Vrtačič; September 17, 1889; Grič pri Dobličah, Črnomelj, Slovenia
- Died: September 8, 1967 (aged 77); Los Gatos, California, U.S.
- Occupations: Poet; writer; teacher
- Spouse: Jakob Zupančič
- Writing career
- Language: Slovene
- Years active: 1929–1967
- Genre: Children's literature

Katka Zupančič (née Vrtačič; September 17, 1889 – September 8, 1967) was a Slovene-American poet, author and teacher. She primarily wrote Slovene-language children's literature. Much of her poetry conveys a child's impression of events, and her stories explore the difficulties of immigrant life and women's status. Her works of prose examine characters' psychology and social issues of the time, placing women, often with emotional distress, in the roles of protagonists.

Zupančič taught in Slovenian schools before she married and followed her husband to the United States. In Chicago, she worked with Yugoslav and Slovene cultural organizations. She died at age 77 in Los Gatos, California, where she had moved four years earlier.

== Biography ==
Katka Vrtačič was born on September 17, 1889, in Grič pri Dobličah, Slovenia, to farmer Katarina (née Kump) and farmer Janez Vrtačič. She had a brother named Mateta. She went to elementary school in Mavrlen, a nun school in Šmihel pri Novem Mestu, and from 1907 to 1911 a teacher's college in Gorizia. She began teaching at a school in Šmihel pri Novem Mestu toward the end of 1911 but became ill and returned home from November 1911 to February 1913. She then resumed teaching at various schools in Slovenia until 1923, the last of which was the German Schulwereen School in Mavrlen, where she was the first Slovenian teacher. While there, she met Jakob Zupančič, and they married in 1920.

Katka followed her husband to the United States in 1923, settling in Chicago, where Jakob had immigrated the previous year. She soon began working with cultural and worker's groups, and her first written works were published in 1929. She contributed articles and poems to the children's magazine Mladinski list (Voice of Youth), for which she was the editor from 1918 to 1926, and worked with the Slovene National Benefit Society (SNPJ), teaching at the Pioneer 559 lodge and directing plays, some of which she wrote, with the Yugoslav Socialist Association in Chicago. Her works were also published in Majski glas (The May Herald), Ameriški družinski koledar (American Family Almanach), Prosveta (Enlightenment), Proletarec (Proletarian) and Cankarjev glasnik (Cankar's Herald).

In 1963, she moved to Los Gatos, California, where she lived until her death on September 8, 1967, a week before her 78th birthday. She was interred in Los Gatos Memorial Park. Her husband Jakob died in 1980 at age 84.

== Literary work ==
=== Poetry ===
Zupančič was best known for her children's poetry, which she also illustrated. Writing in Slovene, she used simple language and evoked the austerity of immigrant life tempered by humor and from a child's point of view. Her poetry uses a refined approach to depict the state of common people, similar to other American Slovene poets, but it is framed not as a realistic depiction of events but with an affecting, subjective perspective. She used a traditional ballad form with irregular rhythm, rhyme and line length.

Her poetry dealt with dark aspects of American life and tactfully showed a disappointment with the American Dream. Her poems often deal with the emotional toll of modern events such as the Great Depression and men's shame over losing their jobs; the tragedies of the Spanish Civil War and the Second World War which begat homelessness, starvation and fratricide; and the plights of women and children without love.

=== Prose ===
Most of Zupančič's stories, like her poetry, are written for children, though some deal with more mature social issues. Unlike some works of prose by immigrants of the era, her writing lifts women's role to that of the protagonist and fleshes out her characters' psychological motivations. Protagonists of her stories often face emotional distress due to abuse or humiliation. The author's word choice is specific and pathetic, often with dark humor. Her stories are lengthy and characterized by fast pace, familiar idioms, biblical allusions and bitterness, particularly in connection to women's status. Most of her stories are set in Slovenia, especially those that deal with cruelty to women, violence which Zupančič suggested was almost expected in lower-class families.

Some of Zupančič's short stories, like much immigrant literature of the time, criticize conditions in the United States. She comments on bankers causing the Depression, economic collapse destroying families, and a perceived hypocrisy among the clergy. Other of her stories show the lasting consequences of apparently trivial actions. Her story "Dota" ("The Dowry", 1932) critiques fathers who act as autocrats holding their daughters' feelings in disregard. In it, a young woman is forced to marry a greedy man who swindles his way into getting a large dowry in compensation for her ugliness. When they return from the wedding, the bride's shepherd is startled and frightens the horses pulling the couple's sleigh. They tear off the road and the bride, though smiling, is found dead in the snow. A similar theme is found in "Žensko dete" ("The Baby Girl", 1946), in which the title character confesses the rejection she and her sister feel from their father because of their gender.
