= Velika Lahinja =

- Location in Slovenia
- Coordinates: 45°32′6.53″N 15°12′19.28″E
- Country: Slovenia
- Traditional region: White Carniola
- Statistical region: Southeast Slovenia
- Municipality: Črnomelj

Area
  - Total: 3.01 km^{2} (1.16 sq mi)
- Elevation: 174.5 m (573 ft)

Population (2020)
  - Total: 44
  - Density: 15/km^{2} (38/sq mi)
- Postal code: 8340

Velika Lahinja (pronounced [ˈʋeːlika ˈlaːxinja]; German: Lachina) is a village on the right bank of the Lahinja River south of the town of Črnomelj in the White Carniola area of southeastern Slovenia. The area is part of the traditional region of Lower Carniola and is now included in the Southeast Slovenia Statistical Region.

== Name ==
The name Velika Lahinja literally means 'big Lahinja', contrasting with that of the nearby village of Mala Lahinja (literally, 'little Lahinja').
