= Kvasica =

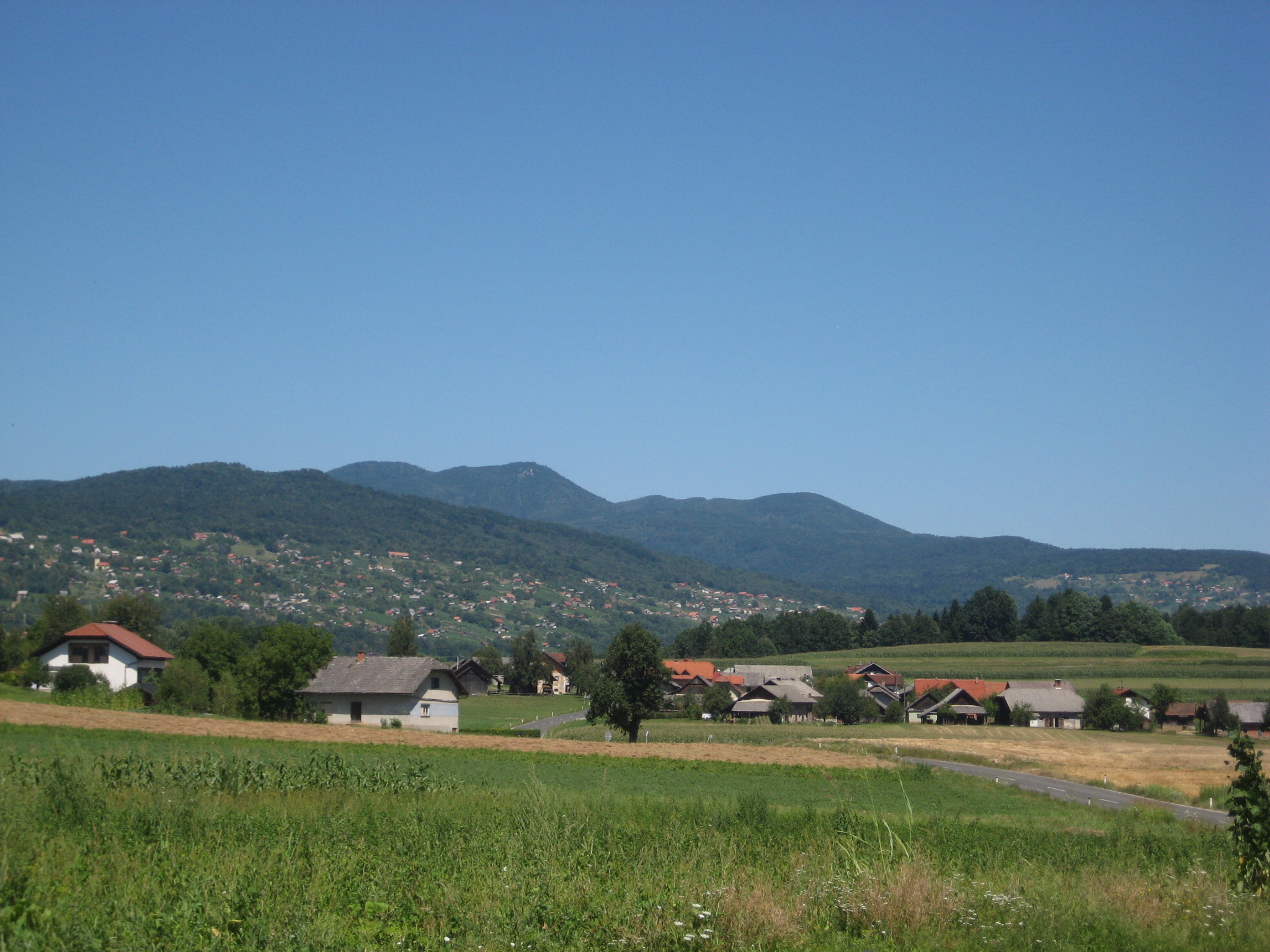

- Location in Slovenia
- Coordinates: 45°32′27.2″N 15°9′38.01″E
- Country: Slovenia
- Traditional region: White Carniola
- Statistical region: Southeast Slovenia
- Municipality: Črnomelj

Area
  - Total: 2.14 km^{2} (0.83 sq mi)
- Elevation: 160.6 m (527 ft)

Population (2020)
  - Total: 51
  - Density: 24/km^{2} (62/sq mi)
- Postal code: 8343

Kvasica (pronounced [kʋaˈsiːtsa]; German: Quasitza) is a settlement on the main road from Črnomelj to Dragatuš in the White Carniola area of southeastern Slovenia. The area is part of the traditional region of Lower Carniola and is now included in the Southeast Slovenia Statistical Region.

== History ==
Two stone axes have been found near the village, testifying to ancient settlements in the area. During the Second World War, a Romani school operated at the former dairy in Kvasica, attended by children from Kanižarica. It was active for only a few months, until the population was massacred by a Partisan unit at Rožič Vrh in the summer of 1942. The Partisans attacked and destroyed an Italian military convoy south of the village on 22 September 1942. A monument to the attack was unveiled in 1959.
