= Bistrica, Črnomelj =

Bistrica
- Location in Slovenia
- Coordinates: 45°34′12.02″N 15°7′1.95″E
- Country: Slovenia
- Traditional region: White Carniola
- Statistical region: Southeast Slovenia
- Municipality: Črnomelj

Area
  - Total: 0.88 km^{2} (0.34 sq mi)
- Elevation: 430.3 m (1,412 ft)

Population (2020)
  - Total: 1
  - Density: 1.1/km^{2} (2.9/sq mi)
- Postal code: 8340

Bistrica (pronounced [ˈbiːstɾitsa]; German: Bistritz) is a small settlement in the hills west of Črnomelj in the White Carniola area of southeastern Slovenia. The area is part of the traditional region of Lower Carniola and is now included in the Southeast Slovenia Statistical Region. It is located on a rocky terrace with sinkholes along the road from Črnomelj to the Poljane Valley (Slovene: Poljanska dolina).

== Name ==
The name Bistrica (and German Bistritz) is of Slovene origin. Bistrica (and its cognates) is a very common Slavic place name; it is a hydronym that was later applied to settlements associated with rivers, creeks, or springs. It is derived from Proto-Slavic *bystrica 'quick-flowing river', in turn from *bystrъ 'quick-flowing, rushing'.

== History ==
Bistrica was an ethnically mixed Slovenian–Gottschee German village until the Second World War. The village was not mentioned in the land registries of 1574 or 1770, and so it may be a more recently founded settlement or it may not have been located within the boundaries of the Dominion of Gottschee. According to oral tradition, the village was founded by people fleeing from bandits. Before the Second World War it had 11 houses and a population of 56. The Gottschee Germans were evicted in the fall of 1941. After the Italian defeat at Kvasica on 22 September 1942, the Partisan Kordun Brigade (Slovene: Kordunaška brigada) established a field hospital in one of the houses in the village. As a result, Italian forces burned that house, and later the entire village on 6 April 1943. On 14 November 1944 there was an engagement near Bistrica between the State Security Army (Slovene: Vojska državne varnosti, the armed forces of the secret police) and allied German and Home Guard forces. After the war only four houses in the village were rebuilt.
