= Golek, Črnomelj =

Golek
- Location in Slovenia
- Coordinates: 45°32′16.42″N 15°10′37.44″E
- Country: Slovenia
- Traditional region: White Carniola
- Statistical region: Southeast Slovenia
- Municipality: Črnomelj

Area
  - Total: 1.51 km^{2} (0.58 sq mi)
- Elevation: 163.5 m (536 ft)

Population (2020)
  - Total: 40
  - Density: 26/km^{2} (69/sq mi)
- Postal code: 8343

Golek (pronounced [ˈɡɔːlək] or [ˈɡoːlək]) is a small village north of Dragatuš in the Municipality of Črnomelj in the White Carniola area of southeastern Slovenia. The area is part of the traditional region of Lower Carniola and is now included in the Southeast Slovenia Statistical Region.

== History ==
During the Second World War, a Partisan blacksmith's workshop operated in Golek, as well as a signal team for Allied aircraft supplying Partisan forces. The signal team initially operated only at night, and starting in 1944 also during daytime operations. The materiel was warehoused in Golek and in Kvasica.

== Church ==
The local church is dedicated to Saint Anthony the Hermit (Slovene: sveti Anton Puščavnik) and belongs to the Parish of Dragatuš. It was built in the 18th century. The church stands next to a cemetery. It has a polygonal chancel closed on three sides and a rectangular nave. A bell tower and wide portico built on masonry piers stand against the main outside wall. The church's interior is Baroque, with a barrel-vaulted nave. The main altar was created in 1899 by the wood carver Karel Poglajen (1849–1890), and a painting of Mary Immaculate in the sacristy is the work of Jernej Jereb (born c. 1825). A plaque in the church wall is dedicated to the last owner of Turn Mansion in Breznik, Matija Primitz (1792–1855) and his wife (1795–1858). In the cemetery there is a monument to Jože Gorše, who was shot on 6 May 1935 in Dragatuš during election demonstrations.
