= Mala Lahinja =

- Location in Slovenia
- Coordinates: 45°30′21.28″N 15°12′1.38″E
- Country: Slovenia
- Traditional region: White Carniola
- Statistical region: Southeast Slovenia
- Municipality: Črnomelj

Area
  - Total: 0.87 km^{2} (0.34 sq mi)
- Elevation: 155.8 m (511 ft)

Population (2020)
  - Total: 21
  - Density: 24/km^{2} (63/sq mi)
- Postal code: 8343

Mala Lahinja (pronounced [ˈmaːla ˈlaːxinja]; German: Lachina) is a settlement at the source of the Lahinja River south of Dragatuš in the Municipality of Črnomelj in the White Carniola area of southeastern Slovenia. The area is part of the traditional region of Lower Carniola and is now included in the Southeast Slovenia Statistical Region.

== Name ==
The name Mala Lahinja literally means 'little Lahinja', contrasting with that of the nearby village of Velika Lahinja (literally, 'big Lahinja').

== Geography ==
The Zjot Karst Field lies south of Mala Lahinja, near the source of the Lahinja River.
