= Draga Ahačič =

Slovene actress, film director, translator and publicist (1924–2022)

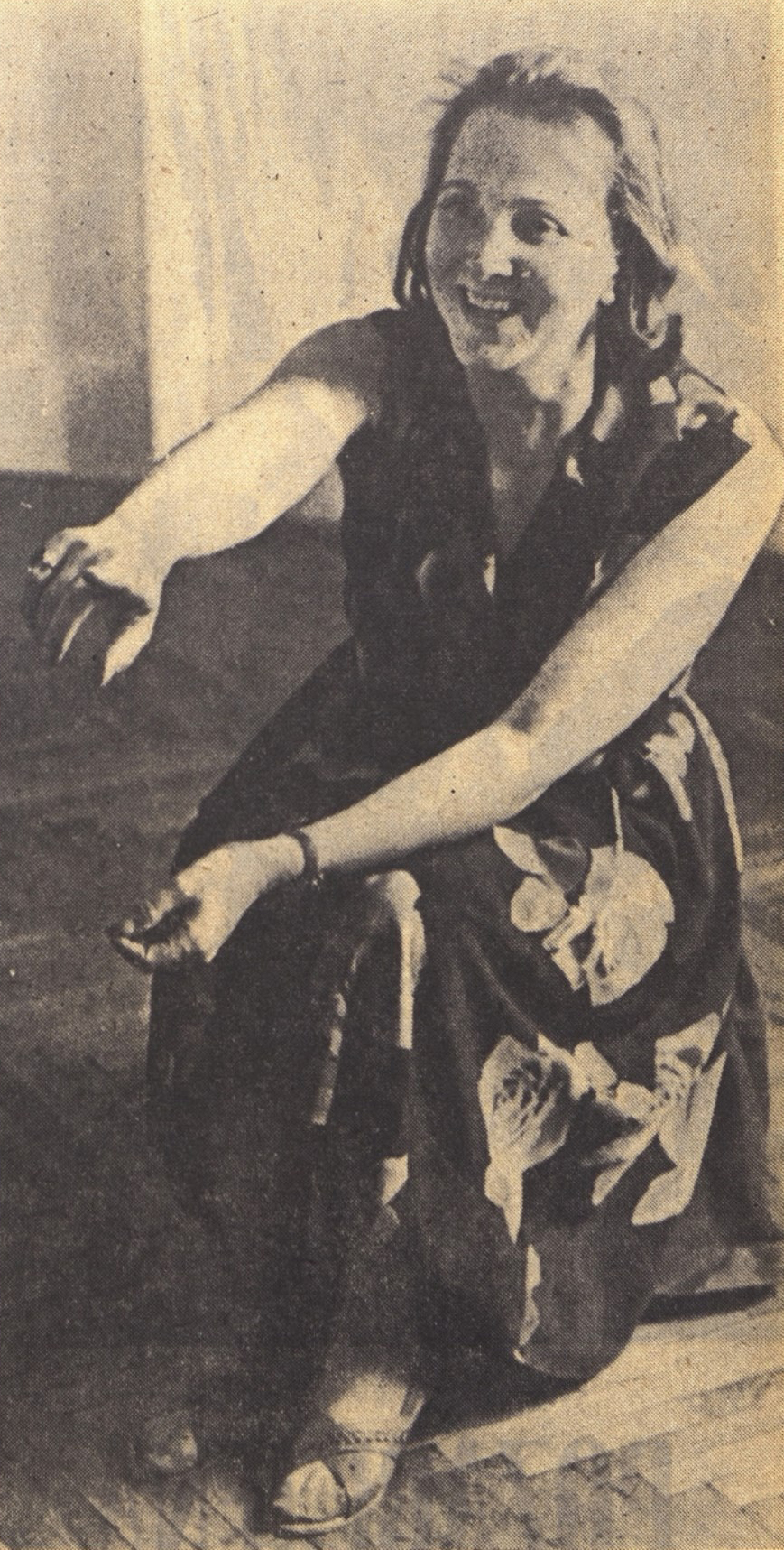
Draga Ahačič

Draga Ahačič (6 July 1924 – 28 December 2022) was a Slovene actress, film director, translator and journalist.

Ahačič was born in the small town of Črnomelj in the White Carniola region of Slovenia (then part of the Kingdom of Serbs, Croats and Slovenes). During World War II, she was a member of the Slovene National Theatre, which was operating within the Partisan resistance. After the war, she worked at the Drama theatre of Ljubljana, where she collaborated with the Slovene playwright and essayist Jože Javoršek. She later established the alternative theatre Ad Hoc (1958–1964), where she was an actress and director.

Ahačič also wrote several books on several matters, including a poetic work on the interpretations of World War II in Slovenia. Her most important work is the book Gledališče pod vprašajem (Theatre Under Question, 1982).

Ahačič was a translator of French, and her focus included authors such as Marguerite Audoux, Jean-Paul Sartre, and Pierre de Marivaux.

Ahačič died on 28 December 2022, at the age of 98.
