= Grič pri Dobličah =

- Location in Slovenia
- Coordinates: 45°33′13.96″N 15°8′12.84″E
- Country: Slovenia
- Traditional region: White Carniola
- Statistical region: Southeast Slovenia
- Municipality: Črnomelj

Area
  - Total: 10.7 km^{2} (4.1 sq mi)
- Elevation: 268.6 m (881 ft)

Population (2020)
  - Total: 83
  - Density: 7.8/km^{2} (20/sq mi)
- Postal code: 8340

Grič pri Dobličah (pronounced [ˈɡɾiːtʃ pɾi dɔˈbliːtʃax]) is a settlement southwest of Dobliče in the Municipality of Črnomelj in the White Carniola area of southeastern Slovenia. The area is part of the traditional region of Lower Carniola and is now included in the Southeast Slovenia Statistical Region. Hamlets of the village includes Dolnji Grič, which comprises the village core, and Gornji Grič, as well as Vidoše (in older sources Vidoši) and Kralji. Vidoše has only a few houses along the road from Bistrica to Mavrlen. Vidoše was formerly a hamlet of Doblička Gora.

== Geography ==
The village lies below the northeast slope of the Poljane Mountains (Slovene: Poljanska gora). There are several caves in the hills above the village. Grdan Cave (Slovene: Grdanji skedenj) lies to the west (Grdan is an old surname in the area and skedenj is a common noun referring to a small, horizontal karst cave). Zjot (or Zjod) Cave lies above the hamlet of Vidoše (the cave's name comes from the ground being eroded by water; cf. izjeda 'a hollow carved by water').

== Name ==
The name of the settlement was changed from Grič to Grič pri Dobličah (literally, 'Grič near Dobliče') in 1955. Grič is a common place name in Slovenia and comes from the common noun grič 'hill', which may refer to elevations rising up to 100 meters (330 ft) in toponyms, although in common usage the noun usually refers to elevations rising 30 meters (98 ft) or less.
