= Mavrlen =

- Location in Slovenia
- Coordinates: 45°34′20.04″N 15°8′12.54″E
- Country: Slovenia
- Traditional region: White Carniola
- Statistical region: Southeast Slovenia
- Municipality: Črnomelj

Area
  - Total: 0.64 km^{2} (0.25 sq mi)
- Elevation: 367.1 m (1,204 ft)

Population (2020)
  - Total: 74
  - Density: 120/km^{2} (300/sq mi)
- Postal code: 8340

Mavrlen (pronounced [ˈmaːʋəɾlɛn]; in older sources also Maverl, German: Maierle) is a settlement in the hills west of Črnomelj in the White Carniola area of southeastern Slovenia. The area is part of the traditional region of Lower Carniola and is now included in the Southeast Slovenia Statistical Region.

== History ==
In the 16th century the village was settled by Gottschee Germans, who remained in the settlement until 1941.

During the Second World War, on 19 July 1942, the Partisan White Carniola Detachment took 61 Roma from Kanižarica. They were marched to Mavrlen, which had recently been emptied of its Gottschee German residents, held prisoner there for two days, and then murdered and buried in the Zagradec Mass Grave (Slovene: Grobišče Zagradec) southeast of the abandoned settlement of Gradec, now part of the settlement of Rožič Vrh. Altogether, around 200 Romani people of Slovenia were killed during the Second World War.

In September 2017, a 71-year-old woman was mauled to death by three pit bulls in Mavrlen.
