= Reformed Church in Austria =

Calvinist Christian denomination in Austria

The Reformed Church in Austria (Protestant Church of the Helvetic Confession; Austrian German: Reformierte Kirche in Österreich, Evangelische Kirche Helvetischen Bekenntnisses) is a Christian denomination in Austria. The origin of the church can traced to the Edict of Tolerance in 1781 and in 1861. The Counter-Reformation changed this, and Protestant worship was not permitted until the toleration act. Some Protestants were able to survive these decades in the valleys of the mountains of Carinthia and Upper Austria. In 1861 full freedom of Protestant worship and public practice were granted.

The Calvinist church traces its theological roots to Calvin and Zwingli. The church's name in German is Evangelische Kirche H.B.(Helvetisches Bekenntnis, meaning Helvetic Confession).

The church has nine congregations and 13,590 members. The church affirms the Heidelberg Catechism, Second Helvetic Confession, the Apostles Creed and the Nicene Creed. Ordination of women and blessing of same-sex marriages are allowed. It is a member of the World Communion of Reformed Churches.

== See also ==
- Georg Erasmus von Tschernembl
