= Topli Vrh =

Topli Vrh may refer to more than one place in Slovenia:

- Topli Vrh, Črnomelj, a former settlement in the Municipality of Črnomelj
- Topli Vrh, Semič, a former settlement in the Municipality of Semič
