= Topli Vrh, Črnomelj =

Topli Vrh
- Location in Slovenia
- Coordinates: 45°34′27.46″N 15°6′31.75″E
- Country: Slovenia
- Traditional region: White Carniola
- Statistical region: Southeast Slovenia
- Municipality: Črnomelj
- Elevation: 569.8 m (1,869 ft)

Population (2002)
  - Total: 0

Topli Vrh (pronounced [ˈtɔːpli ˈʋəɾx]; also Topli Vrh nad Bistrico, German: Warmberg) is a remote abandoned settlement in the Municipality of Črnomelj in the White Carniola area of southeastern Slovenia. The area is part of the traditional region of Lower Carniola and is now included in the Southeast Slovenia Statistical Region. Its territory is now part of the village of Rožič Vrh.

== History ==
Topli Vrh was a Gottschee German village. In 1770 it had 11 houses, but in 1931 only six. It was burned by Italian troops during the Rog Offensive in the summer of 1942 and was not rebuilt. The Loka pri Črmošnjice hunting club built a hunting lodge at the site in 1960.
