= Yugoslav Socialist Association =

Historic American migrant organization

The Yugoslav Socialist Federation (Jugoslovanska Socialistična Zveza) was a socialist migrant organization in the United States of America, 1905 to 1952, founded in Chicago.

The Jugoslav Socialist Federation was established in Chicago, Illinois, in 1905. The founders were Slovenian, Croatian, and Serbian representatives of several independent socialist and liberal organizations. They represented, in education, socioeconomic class and philosophy, the broad range of South Slavic immigrant America. Although not all Marxist, they were unified in opposition to industrial capitalism and the intrusion of organized religion into economic and political spheres. They also believed in the importance of ethnic awareness and inter-ethnic cooperation among workers. These people established a myriad of organizations in America between 1900 and 1918, among them the Slovenska Narodna Podporna Jednota, the South Slavic cooperative movement, and the Yugoslav Republican Alliance.

From 1905 until 1914, the Jugoslav Socialist Federation was the primary political organization among South Slav immigrants, dedicated to advancing socialist causes and to enriching the cultural life of its members. From 1912 to 1917, the Federation was affiliated with the Socialist Party of America; it favored entry of the United States into World War I. In 1919, it was expelled from the Socialist Party and most of its Serbian and Croatian members joined the Communist movement. Most of the Slovenian membership remained independent, but sympathetic to the Bolshevik Revolution. In 1922, the Federation reaffiliated with the Socialist Party and remained so until 1940. From 1940 until it ceased to exist in 1952, it functioned as an independent socialist and cultural organization composed mostly of Slovenians. The Federation published two newspapers, Proletarec (Slovenian) and Radnička Straza (Serbo-Croatian) as well as an annual, Ameriški Družinski Koledar. Majski Glas was the May 1st issue of Proletarec, which became a separate publication.
