= Vinko Beličič =

Slovenian poet and writer

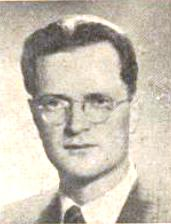
- Vinko Beličič in 1955
- Born: August 19, 1913; Črnomelj, Austria-Hungary
- Died: September 27, 1999 (aged 86); Trieste, Italy
- Occupations: Poet, writer, translator

Vinko (Vincenc) Beličič (August 19, 1913 – September 27, 1999) was a Slovenian poet, writer, translator, journalist, and teacher, an author of textbooks.

== Early life and education ==
Vinko Beličič was born in Črnomelj, Austria-Hungary (now Slovenia), the son of Anton Beličič and Katarina Beličič (née Petric). After his father's death in 1917, he and his mother lived in Rodine. He attended primary school in Talčji Vrh and Črnomelj, and secondary school from 1927 to 1934 in Novo Mesto. He studied Slavic studies at the University of Ljubljana's Faculty of Arts (graduating in 1940), and in 1938 he also studied Italian at the Catholic University of Milan.

== Career ==
Beličič was a prolific author, but out of favor with the Yugoslav authorities, and his books were banned until Slovenia became independent. He therefore wrote under numerous pen names, including Bogdan Hmelnicki, BPFV, Vinko, Olaf Severni, Volkun Belopoljski, Andrej Judnič, and Albin Žunič.
