= Kanižarica =

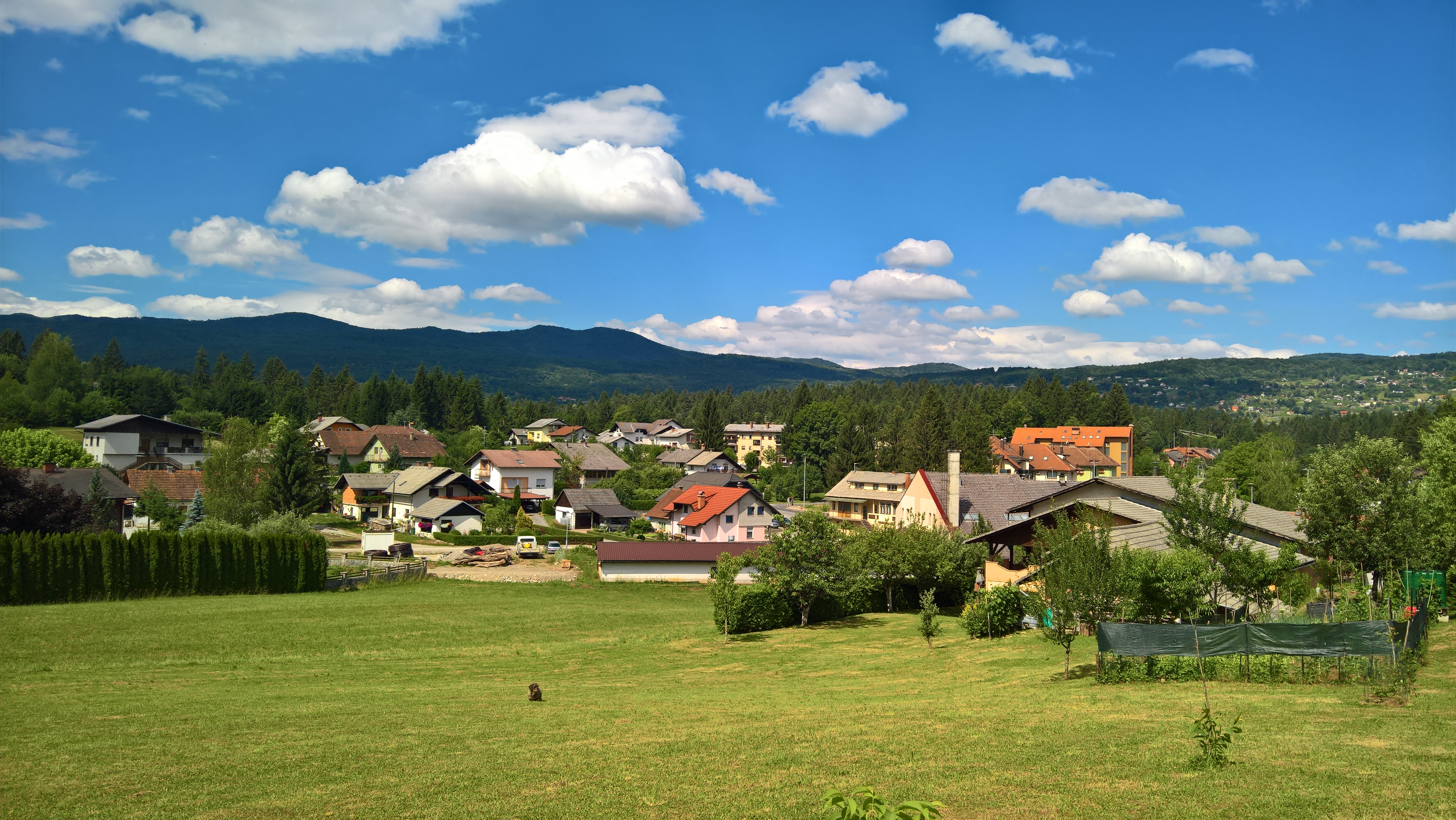

- Location in Slovenia
- Coordinates: 45°33′38.75″N 15°10′2.19″E
- Country: Slovenia
- Traditional region: White Carniola
- Statistical region: Southeast Slovenia
- Municipality: Črnomelj

Area
  - Total: 1.69 km^{2} (0.65 sq mi)
- Elevation: 152.8 m (501 ft)

Population (2020)
  - Total: 590
  - Density: 350/km^{2} (900/sq mi)
- Postal code: 8340

Kanižarica (pronounced [kaˈniːʒaɾitsa]) is a settlement southwest of the town of Črnomelj in the White Carniola area of southeastern Slovenia. The area is part of the traditional region of Lower Carniola and is now included in the Southeast Slovenia Statistical Region.

== History ==
During the Second World War, on 19 July 1942, the Partisan White Carniola Detachment took 61 Roma from Kanižarica. They were marched to Mavrlen, which had recently been emptied of its Gottschee German residents, held prisoner there for two days, and then murdered and buried in the Zagradec Mass Grave (Slovene: Grobišče Zagradec) southeast of the abandoned settlement of Gradec, now part of the settlement of Rožič Vrh.

On 16 September 2022, flooding in Kanižarica had to be combatted with flood bags and pumping.

== Coal mine ==
A coal mine in the settlement that began in 1857 and was closed 1995 is partly preserved. The main mine shaft has been filled in, but the headframe and administrative buildings remain and some of the original mining equipment is displayed in a reconstructed shaft.
