= Yugoslav Republican Alliance =

The Yugoslav Republican Alliance (Jugoslovanski Republicansko Zdruzenje) was a political party founded in 1917 founded in exile in Chicago, United States, by the fusion of the Slovene Republican Alliance with Croats and other South Slav people. It declared support for a "Federal Republic of Yugoslavia" and declared that it opposed the Serbian monarchy taking the position of head of state of Yugoslavia, and refused to have the ethnicities of Yugoslavia be forced to be assimilated into being exclusively a singular Yugoslav identity.
