= Rožič Vrh =

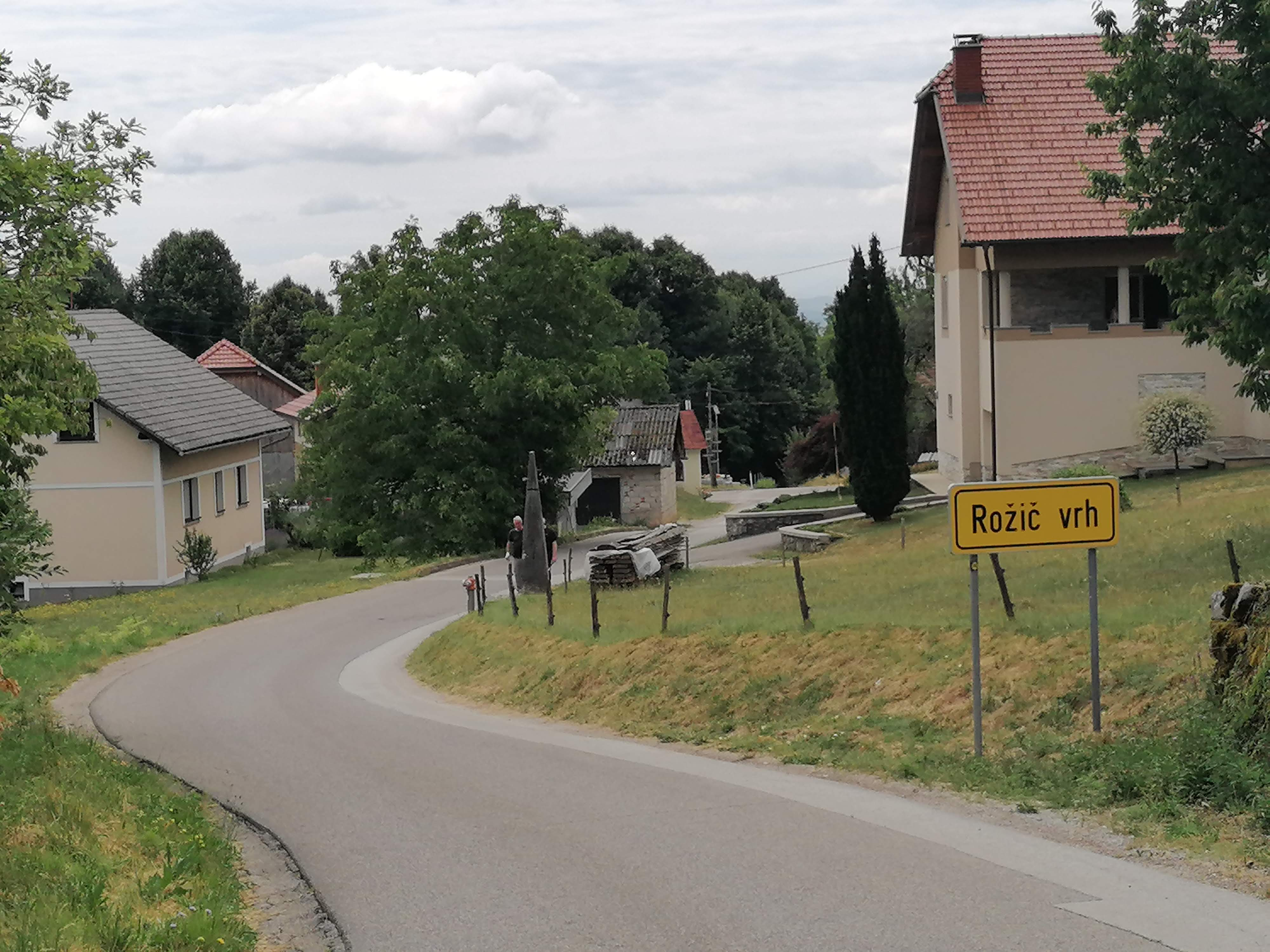

- Location in Slovenia
- Coordinates: 45°35′20.92″N 15°8′33.91″E
- Country: Slovenia
- Traditional region: White Carniola
- Statistical region: Southeast Slovenia
- Municipality: Črnomelj

Area
  - Total: 17.56 km^{2} (6.78 sq mi)
- Elevation: 310.9 m (1,020 ft)

Population (2020)
  - Total: 48
  - Density: 2.7/km^{2} (7.1/sq mi)
- Postal code: 8340

Rožič Vrh (pronounced [ˈɾoːʒitʃ ˈʋəɾx], in older sources Rožičev verh, German: Roschitschwerch) is a settlement in the hills west of the town of Črnomelj in the White Carniola area of southeastern Slovenia. The area is part of the traditional region of Lower Carniola and is now included in the Southeast Slovenia Statistical Region. It includes the territory of the abandoned village of Gradec (also known as Zagradec) and Topli Vrh.

== Mass graves ==
Rožič Vrh is the site of two known mass graves associated with the Second World War. The Zagradec Mass Grave (Slovene: Grobišče Zagradec) is located in a sinkhole below a forest trail and hay meadow southeast of Gradec. The grave contains the remains of 61 Roma from Kanižarica that were murdered on 21 July 1942. The Rožič Vrh Mass Grave (Grobišče Rožič Vrh) is located in the forest 2.5 kilometers (1.6 mi) west of Rožič Vrh, towards Gradec.
