= Gradec, Črnomelj =

Gradec
- Location in Slovenia
- Coordinates: 45°35′12″N 15°6′51″E
- Country: Slovenia
- Traditional region: White Carniola
- Statistical region: Southeast Slovenia
- Municipality: Črnomelj
- Elevation: 560 m (1,840 ft)

Population (2002)
  - Total: 0

Gradec (pronounced [ˈɡɾaːdəts]; sometimes Zagradec; German: Grodetz, Groditz, or Grodez; Gottscheerish: Grodetz) is a remote abandoned settlement in the Municipality of Črnomelj in the White Carniola area of southeastern Slovenia. The area is part of the traditional region of Lower Carniola and is now included in the Southeast Slovenia Statistical Region. Its territory is now part of the village of Rožič Vrh.

== Name ==
The toponym Gradec is relatively common in Slovenia and is derived from the Slovene common noun gradec 'small walled settlement' (which only later developed the contemporary meaning 'castle, chateau'). However, the linguist Anton Breznik (1881–1944) proposed that in this case the name is derived from the Slovene noun grod 'rib, ridge', referring to the location of the settlement on a ridge. The German name Grodetz is derived from the Slovene name.

== History ==
Gradec was a Gottschee German village. It was not mentioned in the land registry of 1574 or in the census of 1770, and so it was presumably founded later. Before the Second World War it had six houses and a population of 33. The residents were evicted in the fall of 1941 and the area was burned by Italian troops during the Rog Offensive in the summer of 1942. After the war a logger's cabin was built at the site, which is accessible by a forest road. The former village is registered as a cultural heritage site.

=== Mass grave ===
Gradec is the site of a mass grave associated with the Second World War. The Zagradec Mass Grave (Slovene: Grobišče Zagradec) is located in a sinkhole below a forest trail and hay meadow southeast of the settlement. The grave contains the remains of 61 Roma from Kanižarica that were murdered on 21 July 1942.

== Church ==
A chapel of ease, dedicated to the Holy Cross, stood in the village. It served as a pilgrimage destination. According to oral tradition, the church was built between 1550 and 1580.
