= Georg Erasmus von Tschernembl =

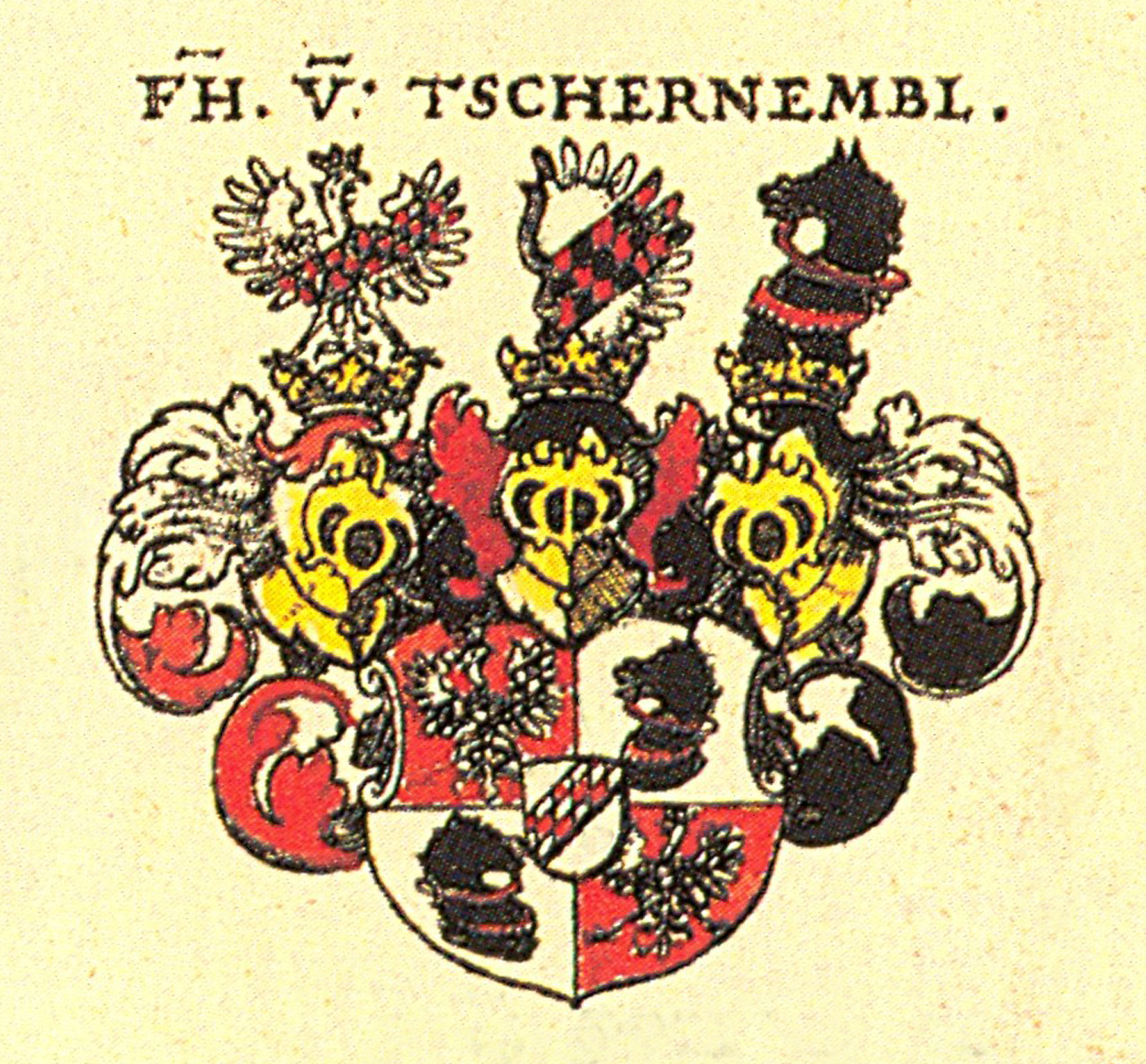
Tschernembl coat of arms

Georg Erasmus Freiherr von Tschernembl (26 January 1567 – 18 November 1626) was a Calvinist Austrian nobleman.

Tschernembl was born on 26 January 1567 in Schwertberg in Upper Austria into the noble Tschernembl family. At the time, the Austrian nobility was predominantly Lutheran and Tschernembl's family was no exception. His grandfather had moved the family there from Carniola. His father, Hans, purchased the local castle. He was educated at home until he entered the University of Altdorf in November 1580. He left the university a committed Calvinist. With Paulus Melissus, he undertook a grand tour of Europe, visiting London, Paris and Geneva. He returned home no less Calvinist but with an ecumenical spirit. He was studying law in Italy in 1588.

During the Upper Austrian peasant revolt of 1596–1597, Tschernembl condemned the peasants for resorting to violence but urged a settlement of their grievances. With Gotthard von Starhemberg, he opposed the policies of Rudolf II and Matthias against Protestants and resisted the efforts of the commander Hans Jakob Löbl to transfer Protestant churches to the Catholic church. In Prague in 1600 he won concessions for Protestants, but in August 1601 he was summoned to Vienna and held practically a prisoner until he agreed to implement certain anti-Protestant decrees.

Following the Bocskai uprising of 1604 in Hungary, Tschernembl renewed his efforts to obtain freedom for Austrian Protestants. He supported the League of Horn and sought alliances with foreign nobles, like Karl Žerotín, Václav Budovec of Budov, György Thurzó and Prince Christian of Anhalt. He won concessions from the estates of Lower Austria in 1608 and from Matthias in 1609 and 1610, but the outbreak of the Thirty Years' War in 1618 considerably weakened the Protestant position in Austria. When Upper Austria was overrun by Bavarians in 1620, he fled to Bohemia. In 1622, the Jesuit Jakob Keller published a manuscript of Tschernembl's recommendations to King Frederick of Bohemia with his own commentary under the title Consultationes. The document had been captured after the siege of Heidelberg. As published, it contains 38 recommendations.

After the Protestant defeat in the Battle of White Mountain in 1620, Tschernembl spent the next two years in exile in the Upper Palatinate and the Duchy of Württemberg. After the fall of Heidelberg, he moved to Geneva in the autumn of 1622, where the Calvinist authorities welcomed him. He died on 18 November 1626 in Geneva.

== Bibliography ==
- Daniel, David P. (2005) [1996]. "Tschernembl, George Erasmus Von". In Hans J. Hillebrand (ed.). The Oxford Encyclopedia of the Reformation. Oxford University Press. ISBN 978-0-19-506493-3.
- Sturmberger, Hans (1953). Georg Erasmus Tschernembl: Religion, Libertät und Widerstand. Graz.
- Thaler, Peter (2015). "Conservative Revolutionary: Georg Erasmus von Tschernembl and the Ideology of Resistance in Early Modern Austria". History of European Ideas. 41 (4): 544–564. doi:10.1080/01916599.2014.934548. S2CID 143753992.
- Thaler, Peter (2016). "Fall of the Peacemakers: Austria's Protestant Nobility and the Advent of the Thirty Years' War". Renaissance and Reformation. 39 (3): 133–158. doi:10.33137/rr.v39i3.27723. JSTOR 26398440. S2CID 171982538.
