= Črnomelj =

- Town
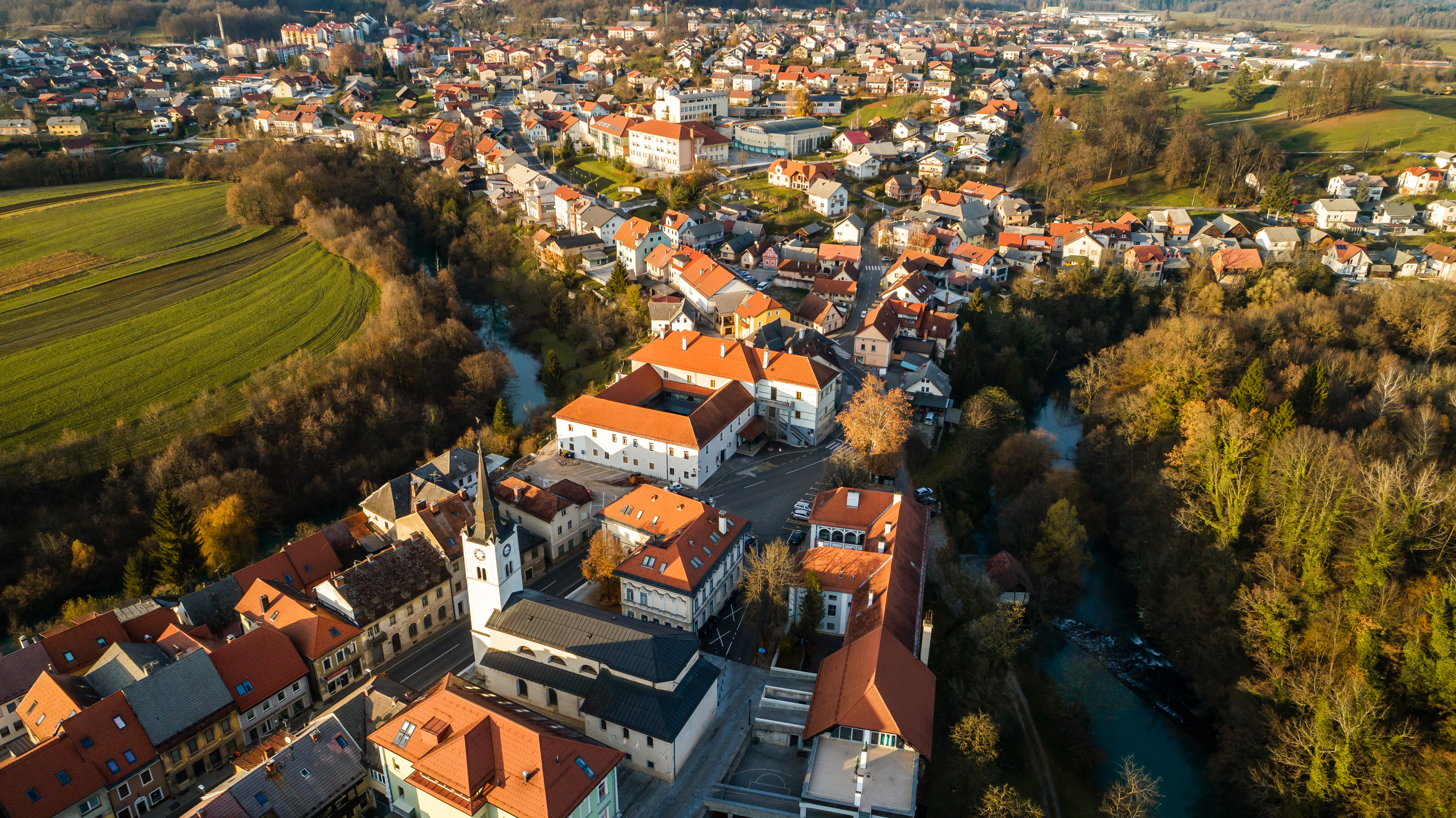
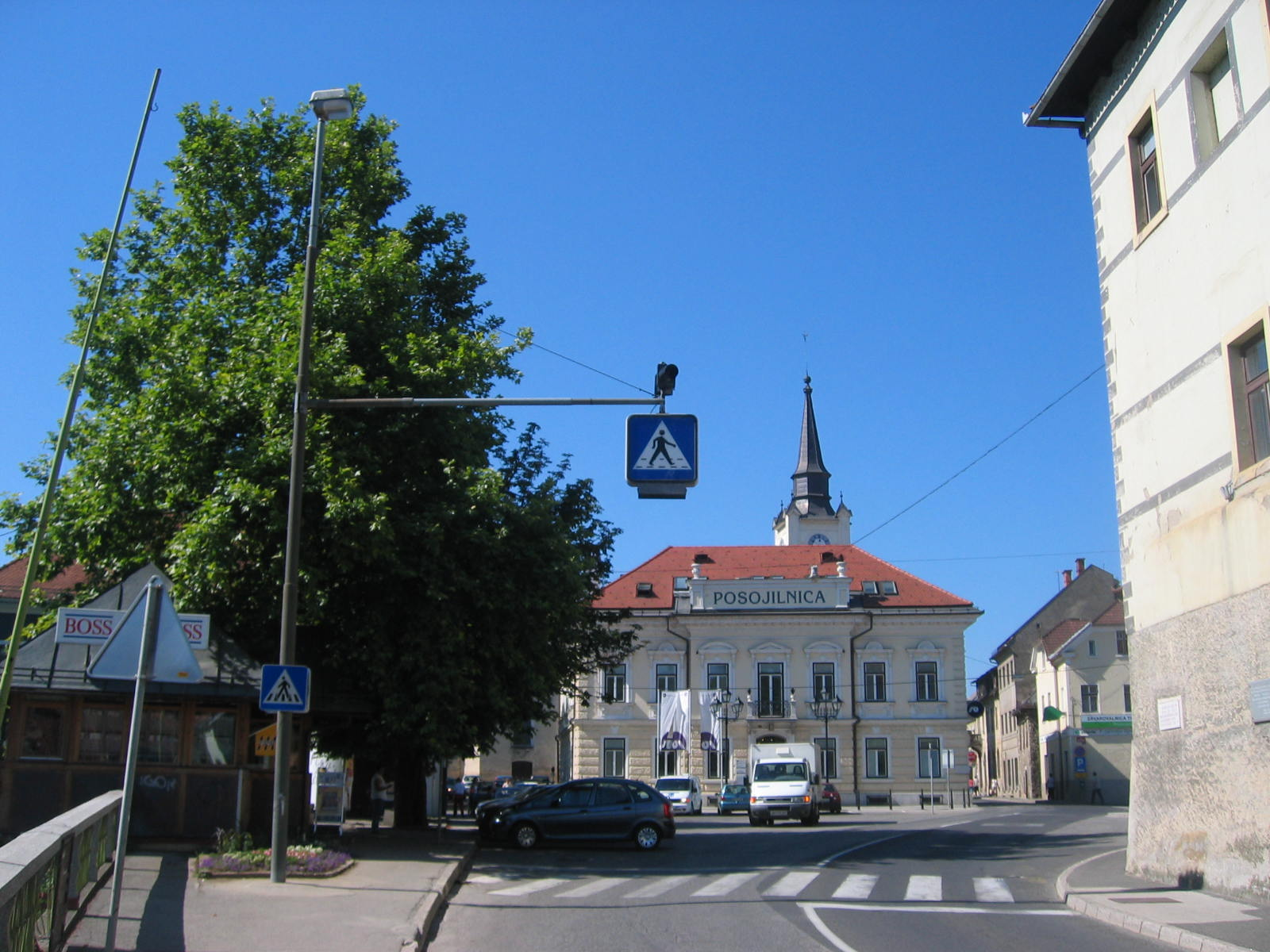
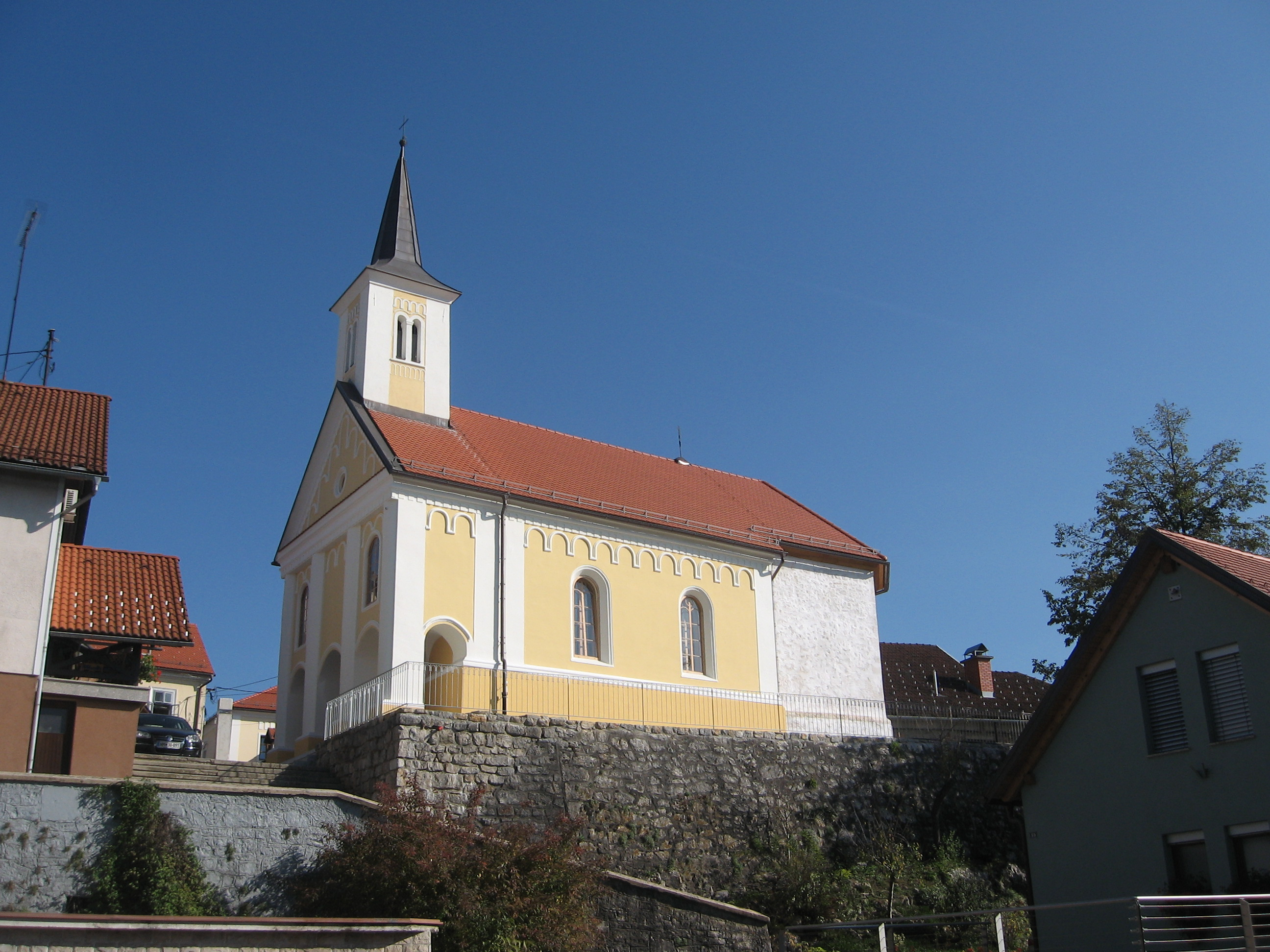
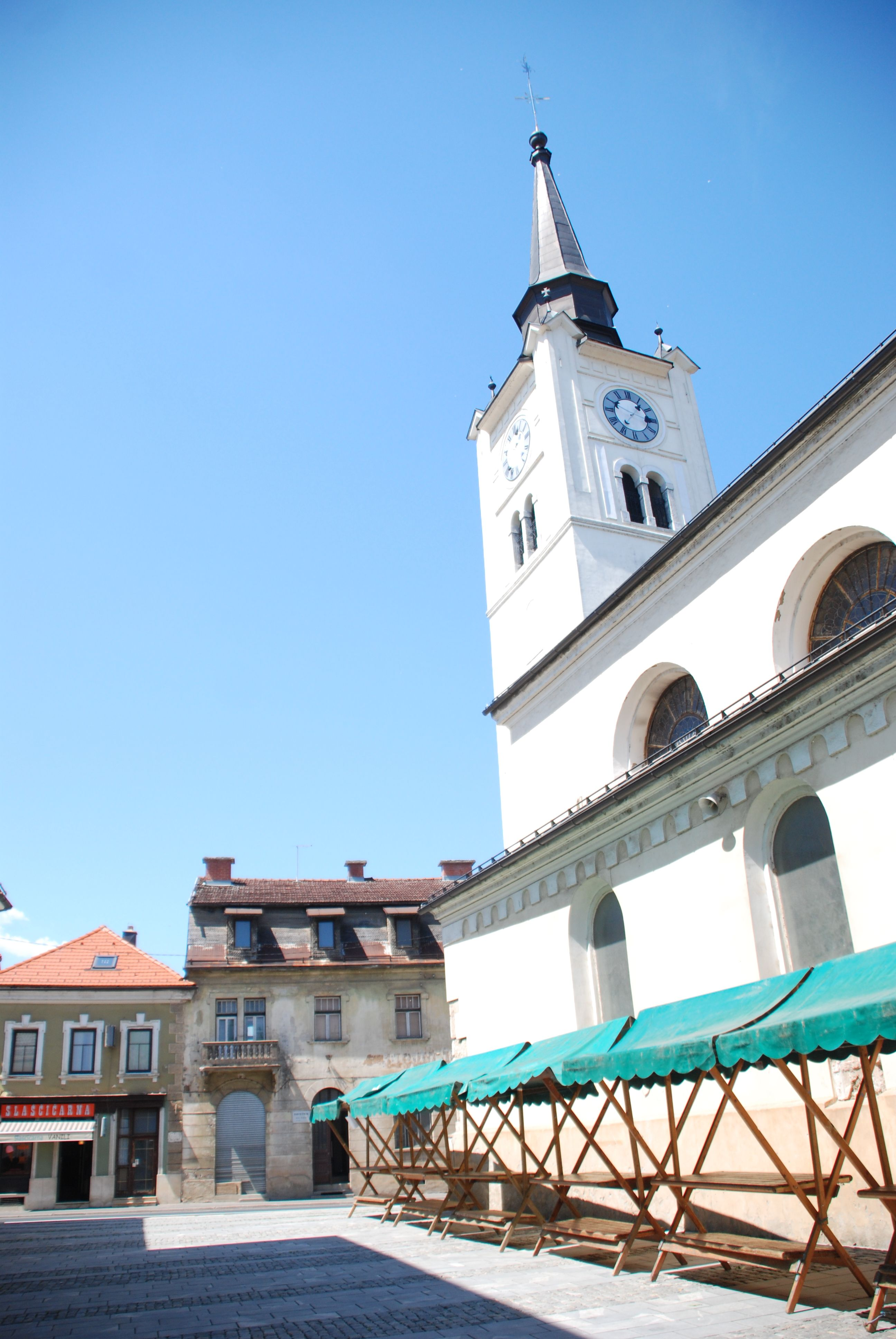
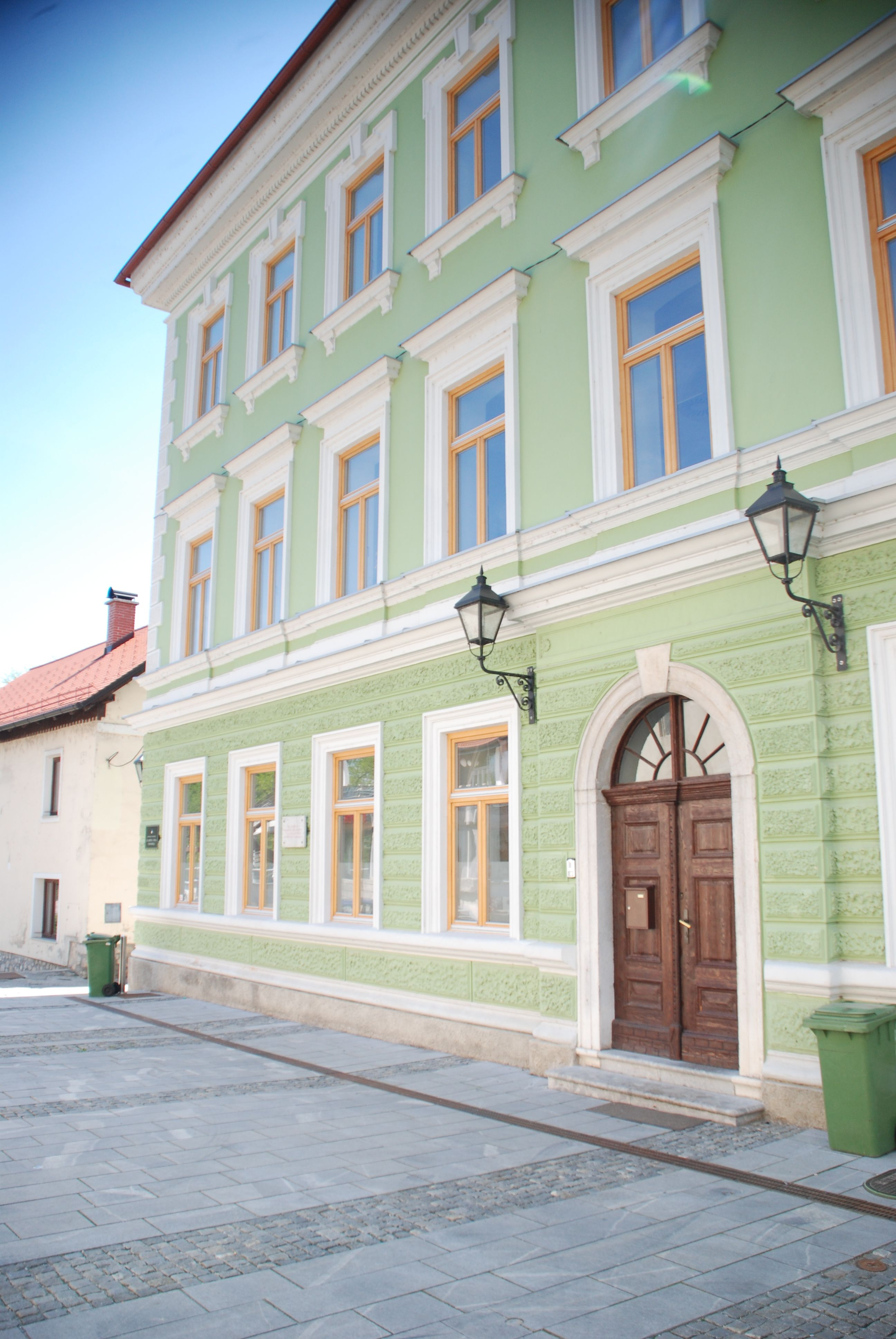
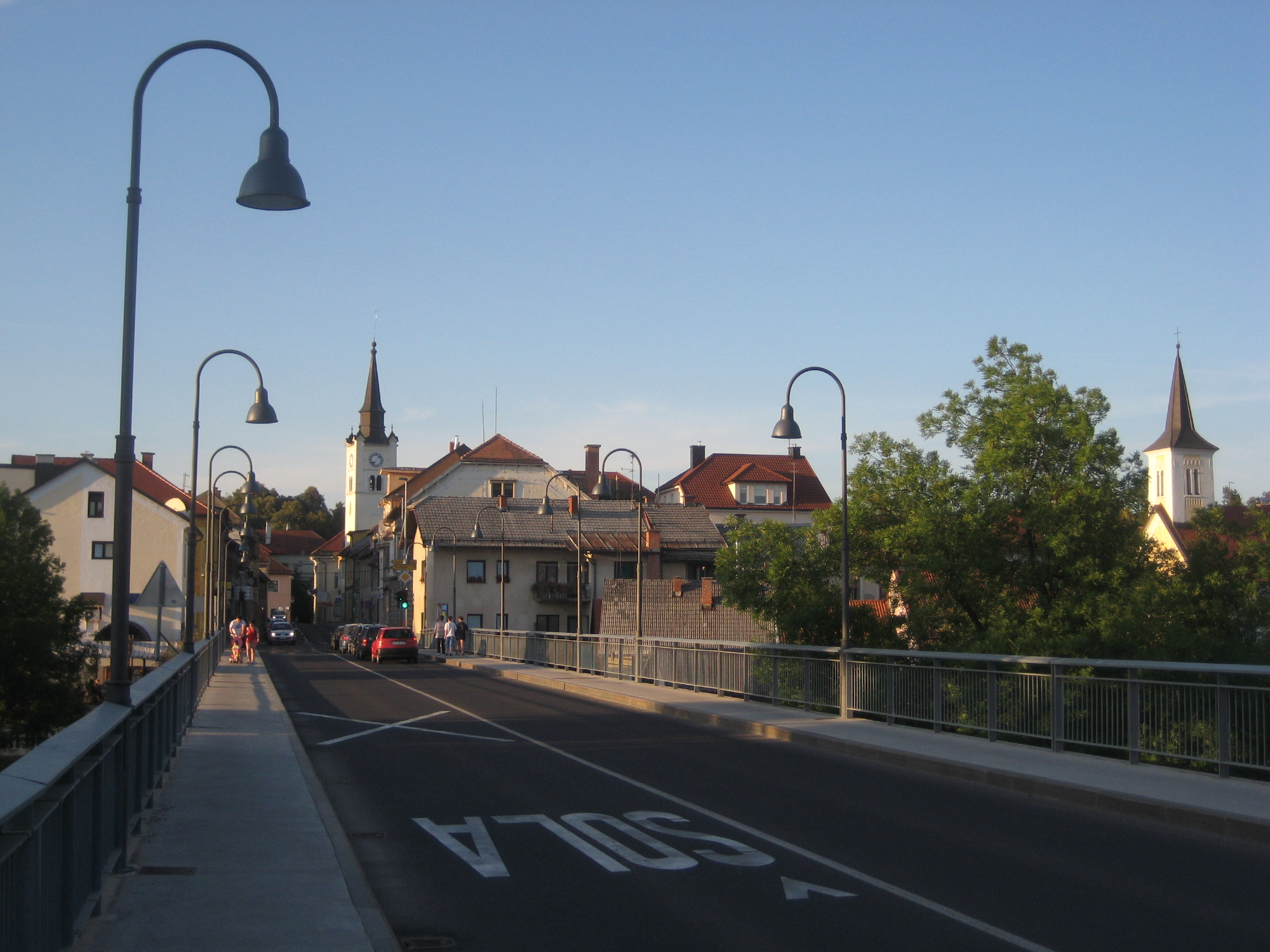
- From top, left to right: Črnomelj from above, Town center, Holy Spirit Church, St. Peter's Church, Musical School, Bridge into old town

- Flag Coat of arms

- Location of Črnomelj in Slovenia
- Coordinates: 45°34′25.68″N 15°11′39″E
- Country: Slovenia
- Traditional region: White Carniola
- Statistical region: Southeast Slovenia
- Municipality: Črnomelj

Area
  - Total: 12.9 km^{2} (5.0 sq mi)
- Elevation: 172 m (564 ft)

Population (2020)
  - Total: 5,496
  - Density: 426/km^{2} (1,100/sq mi)
- Time zone: UTC+01 (CET)
  - Summer (DST): UTC+02 (CEST)
- Postal code: 8340 Črnomelj
- Vehicle registration: NM
- Climate: Cfb

Črnomelj (pronounced [tʃəɾˈnòːməl]; in older sources also Černomelj, German: Tschernembl) is a town in southeastern Slovenia. It is the seat of the Municipality of Črnomelj. It lies on the left bank of the Lahinja and Dobličica rivers. The municipality is at the heart of the area of White Carniola, the southeastern part of the traditional region of Lower Carniola. It is now included in the Southeast Slovenia Statistical Region. It includes the hamlets of Čardak, Kočevje, Kozji Plac, Loka, and Nova Loka.

== Name ==
Črnomelj was first attested in written sources in 1228 as Schirnomel (and as Zernomel in 1263, Zermenli in 1277, and Tscherneml in 1490). The name is derived from *Čьrnomľь, based on the hypocorism *Čьrnomъ, thus originally meaning 'Črnom's settlement'. In the modern German the name was Tschernembl.

Until 1918, the Austro-Hungarian postal service used the bilingual names Tschernembl – Černomelj. The German name alone was used by the postal service before 1867.

Historical population
Year	Pop.	±%
1948	2,058	—
1953	2,381	+15.7%
1961	2,853	+19.8%
1971	3,744	+31.2%
1981	4,887	+30.5%
1991	5,523	+13.0%
2002	5,854	+6.0%
2011	5,776	−1.3%
2021	5,451	−5.6%
Population size may be affected by changes in administrative divisions.

== History ==
=== Prehistory ===
Archaeological evidence has shown that the area has been settled since from the late Bronze Age onwards with the settlement gradually developing through the Iron Age. The exact year of the destruction of the Iron Age settlement by Romans is not known. Evidence indicates that it was destroyed either during Octavians campaign against the Illyrians between 35 and 33 BC, Tiberius's campaign in Pannonia in 12 to 9 BC, or in the Great Illyrian revolt of 6 to 9 AD; that is, in the time span between 35 BC and 9 AD.

=== Middle Ages ===
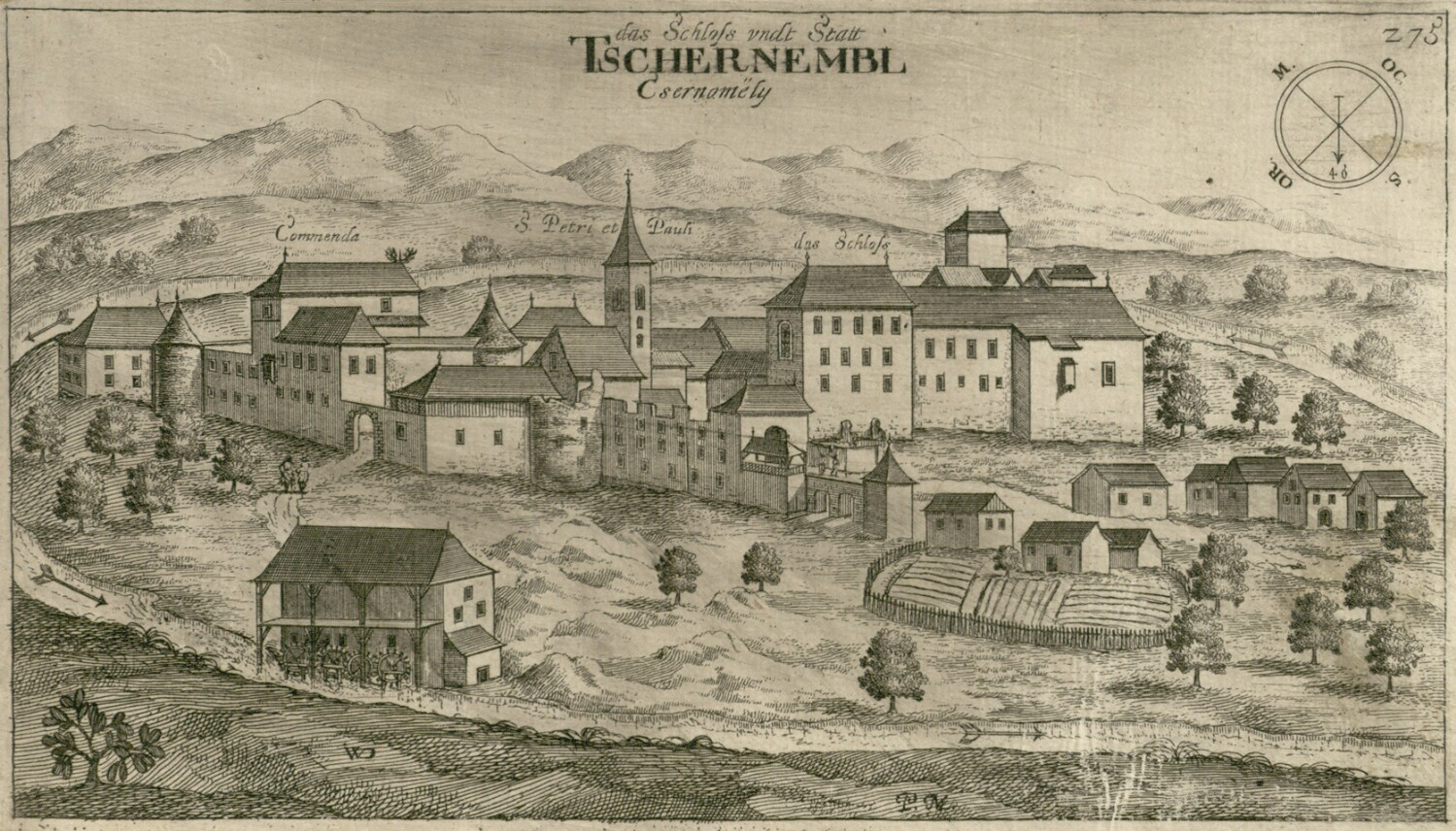
Engraving of Črnomelj by Valvasor (1679)

It was first mentioned as Schirnomel in written documents dating to 1228, in a charter issued by the Patriarch of Aquileia. Before 1277 it was granted market rights and developed into a regional center. It was mentioned as a town in 1407, and so it presumably gained town privileges prior to that, but it is regularly mentioned as a market even after that. During the 16th century it held an important military position as one of the centers for organizing supplies for the military frontier. After the establishment of Karlovac in what is now Croatia in 1579, it lost that position.

Črnomelj was also the home of a powerful noble family of von Tschernembl. Mentioned for the first time in 1267, they gradually achieved important posts in the Habsburg nobility of Carniola. During the 15th century they expanded their influence and one of the heads of the family, Georg von Tschernembl, held the positions of Captain of Triest and Captain of Styria, one of the most important lands of Habsburgs. In the 16th century they joined the Protestant nobility of Inner Austria and in 1564 Hans von Tschernembl sold their numerous holdings in Carniola and moved to Upper Austria. There the most important and known member of the family was born in 1567, Georg Erasmus von Tschernembl, an important political leader of the Protestant nobility of Upper and Lower Austria. After his death in 1626, the family became Catholic again and regained their lost possessions in Upper Austria. The last male member of the family died in 1667, but through numerous female members their bloodline continued into some of the royal houses of today's Europe. They served as an example of ruined nobility of 18th century for the German writer Gottlieb August Crüwell (de) and his work Schönwiesen, printed in Berlin in 1911.

=== Modern history ===
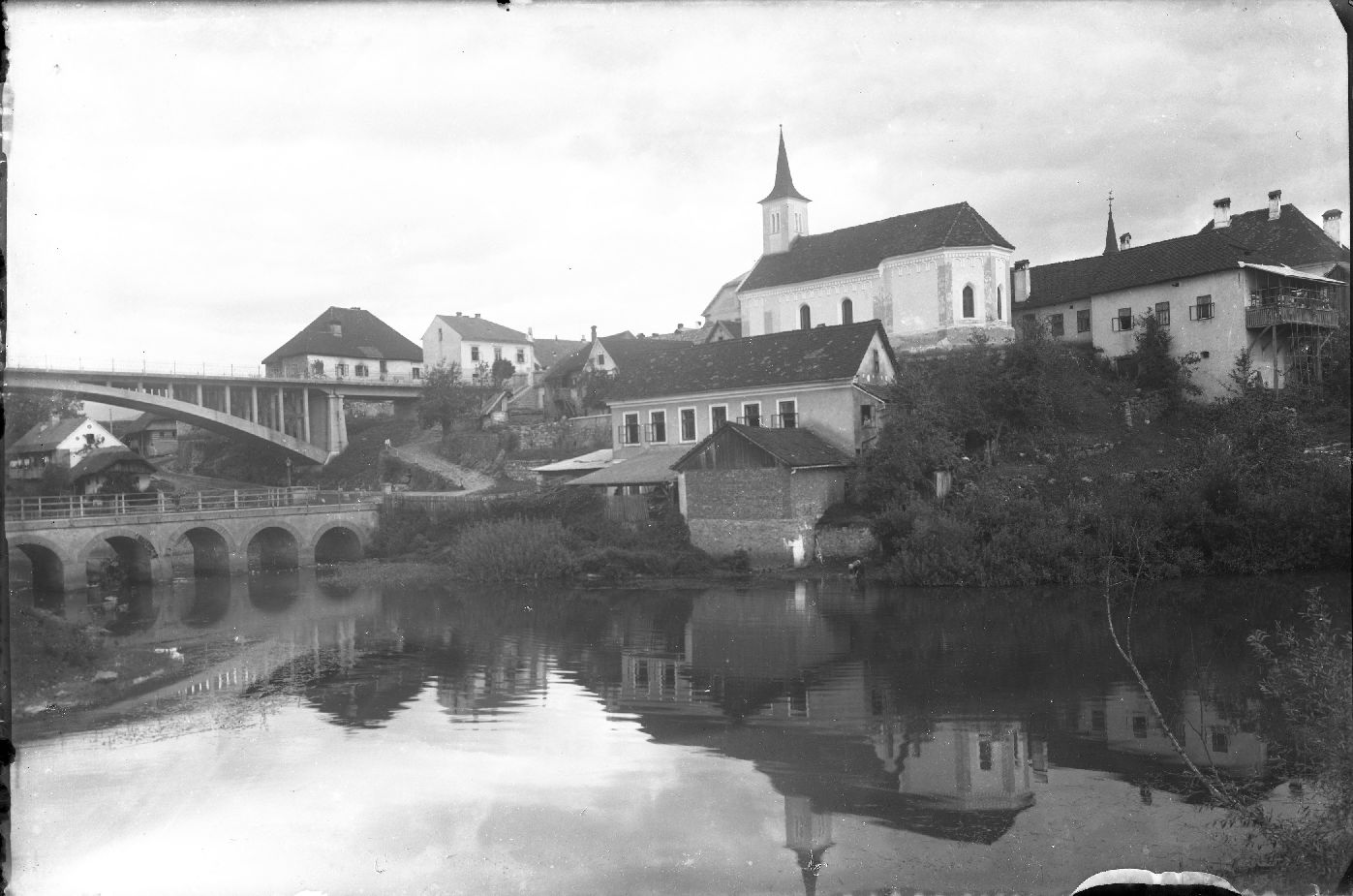
Historical photograph of Črnomelj from the 1920s

Until 1918, the town was part of the Austrian monarchy (the Austria side after the compromise of 1867). It was the seat of the district of the same name, and one of the 11 Bezirkshauptmannschaften in the province of Carniola.

==== Mass grave ====
Črnomelj is the site of a mass grave associated with the Second World War. The Parish Shed Mass Grave (Slovene: Grobišče v farovški loži) is located north of town on the edge of a small sinkhole in the woods. It contains the remains of undetermined victims.

==== Recent ====
In 2018, Črnomelj was hit with tennis ball–sized hail.

== Landmarks ==
The parish church in the town is dedicated to Saint Peter and belongs to the Roman Catholic Diocese of Novo Mesto. The current building was built in the 17th century on the site of a 13th-century church. There are two other churches in the town. One, dedicated to Saint Sebastian, is mentioned as a chapel in the early 16th century, but was extended into a church in 1646 after an outbreak of the plague. It was restored in 1904 and in 1963. The second is dedicated to the Holy Spirit and is a Gothic building first mentioned in documents dating to 1487, but frequently restyled, most recently in 1895. It is built on top of prehistoric and Roman occupation layers.

A monument in the town is dedicated to fallen Partisans. It stands on a small hill called Griček. It is the work of Marko Župančič with sculptures by Jakob Savinšek.

=== Gallery ===
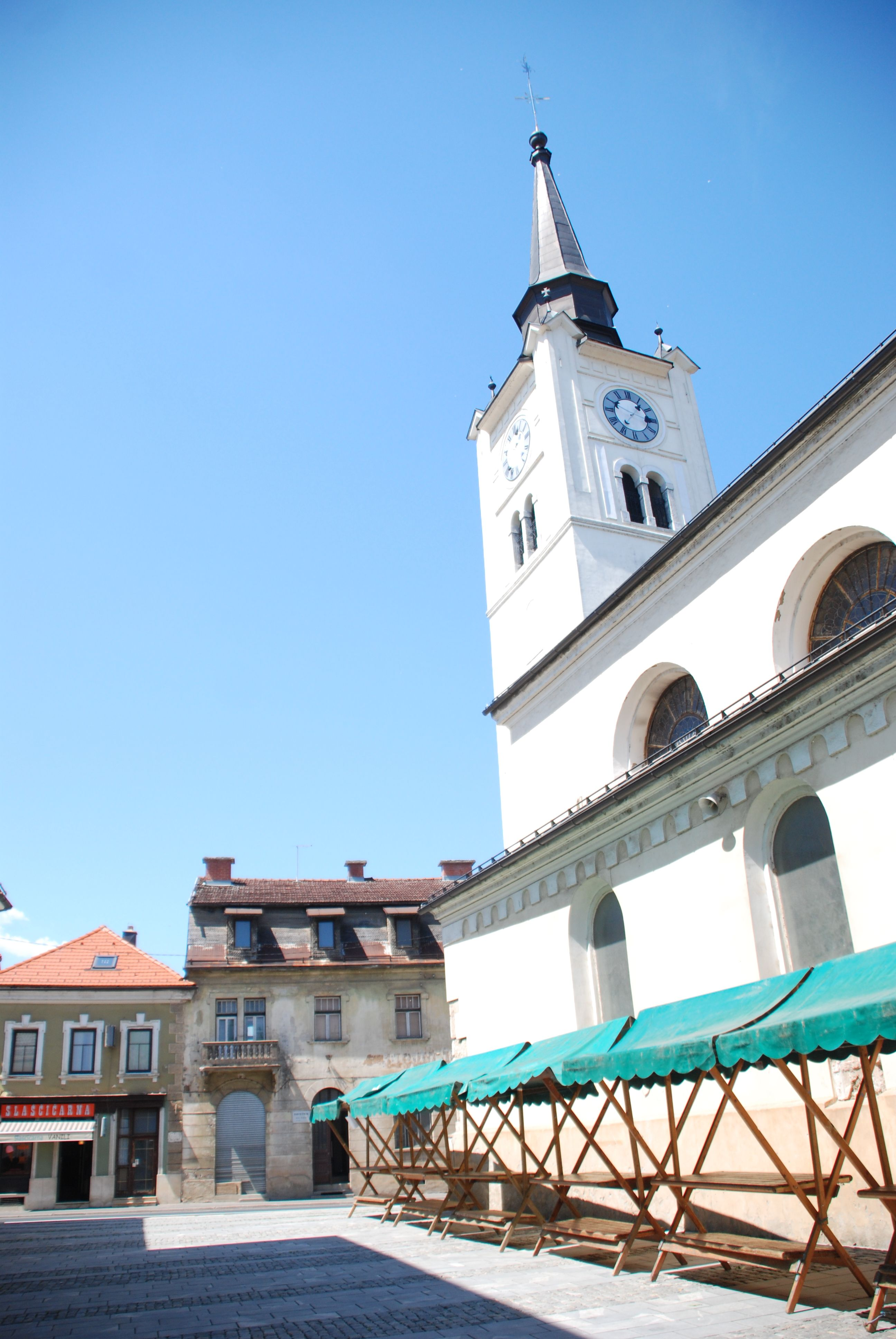
St. Peter's Parish Church

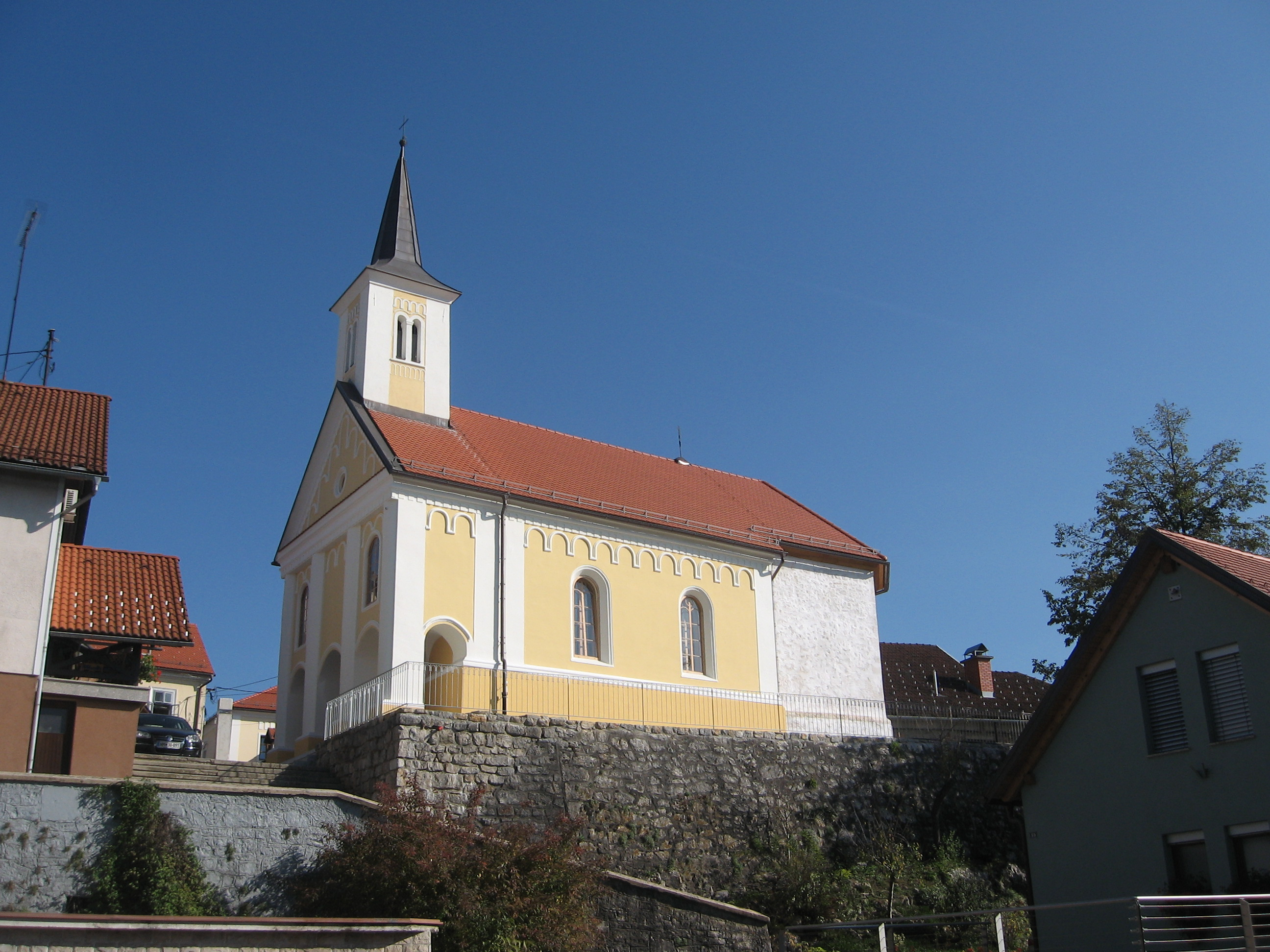
Holy Spirit Church

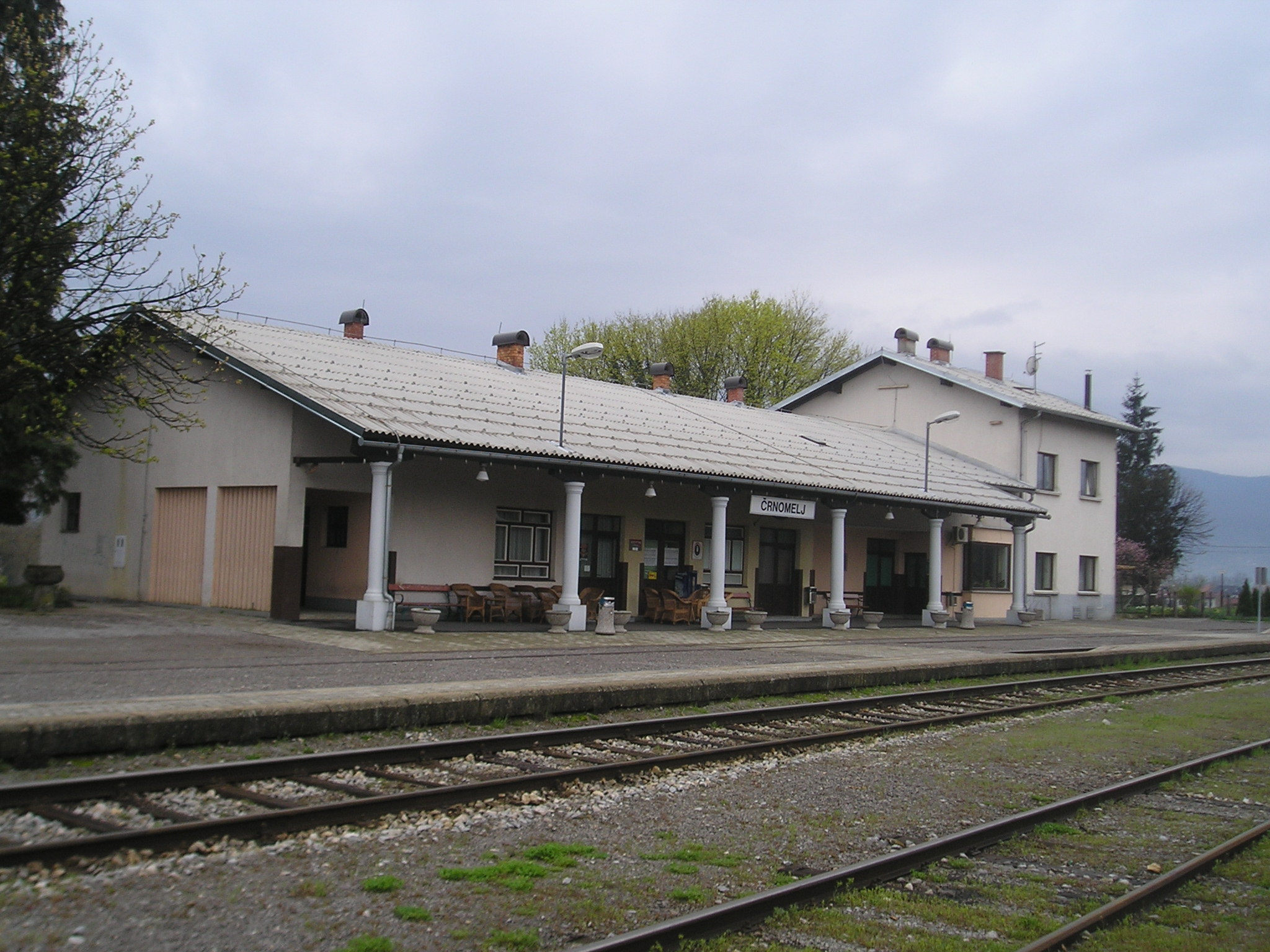
Črnomelj railway station

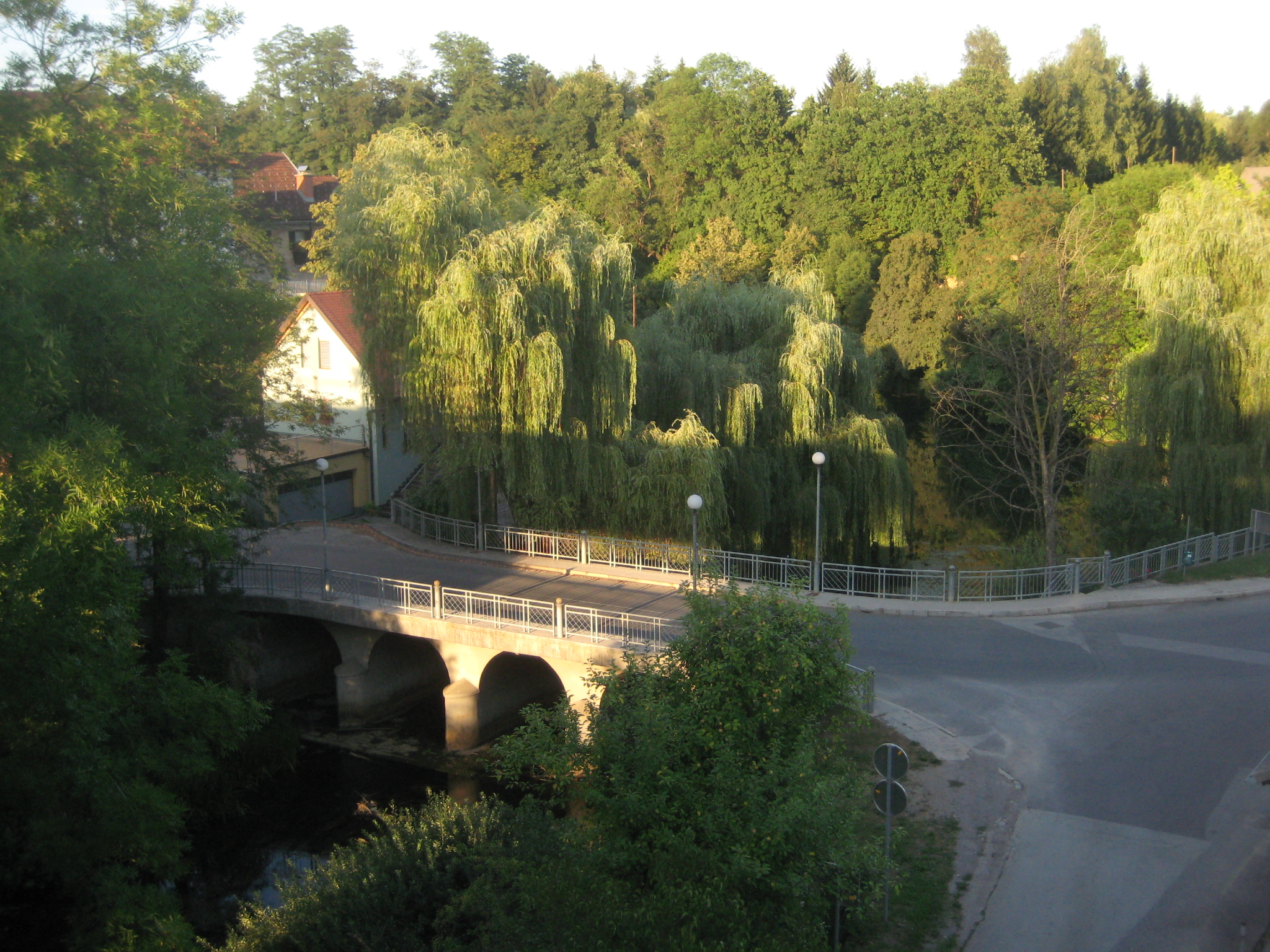
A road bridge before the confluence of Dobličica Creek and the Lahinja

== Culture ==
The town is home to Slovenian football club Bela Krajina Črnomelj.

== Notable people ==
- Vinko Beličič (1913–1999), poet, writer
- Olga Haring, (1866–1943), landowner and poet
- Jasmin Kurtić (born 1989), footballer
