= White Carniola =

Traditional region of Slovenia

Coordinates: 45°34′0″N 15°12′0″E

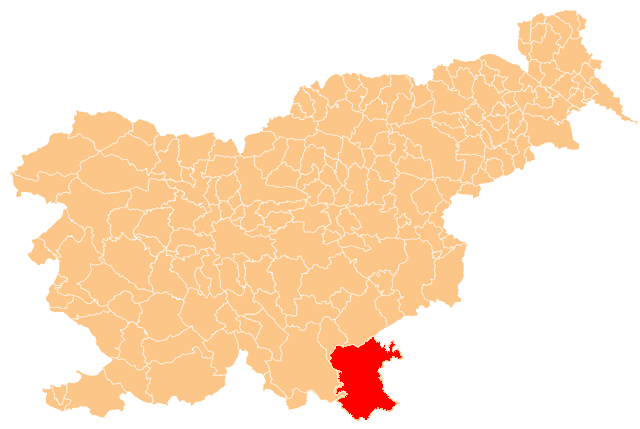
Location of White Carniola in Slovenia

White Carniola (Slovene: Bela krajina; Croatian: Bela krajina; German: Weißkrain or Weiße Mark) is a traditional region in southeastern Slovenia on the border with Croatia. Due to its smallness, it is often considered a subunit of the broader Lower Carniola region, although with distinctive cultural, linguistic, and historical features.

Due to its proximity with Croatia, White Carniola shares many cultural and linguistic features with the neighboring Kajkavian Croatian areas. It is generally considered the Slovenian region with the closest cultural affinity with other South Slavic territories. It was part of Slavonia until the 12th century, after which it shared the historical fate with the Windic March and Lower Carniola to the north. During the 19th century, it was one of the regions with the highest emigration rate in the Slovene Lands, and the Austrian Empire in general. During World War II, it was an important center of anti-Fascist resistance in Slovenia.

== Geography ==
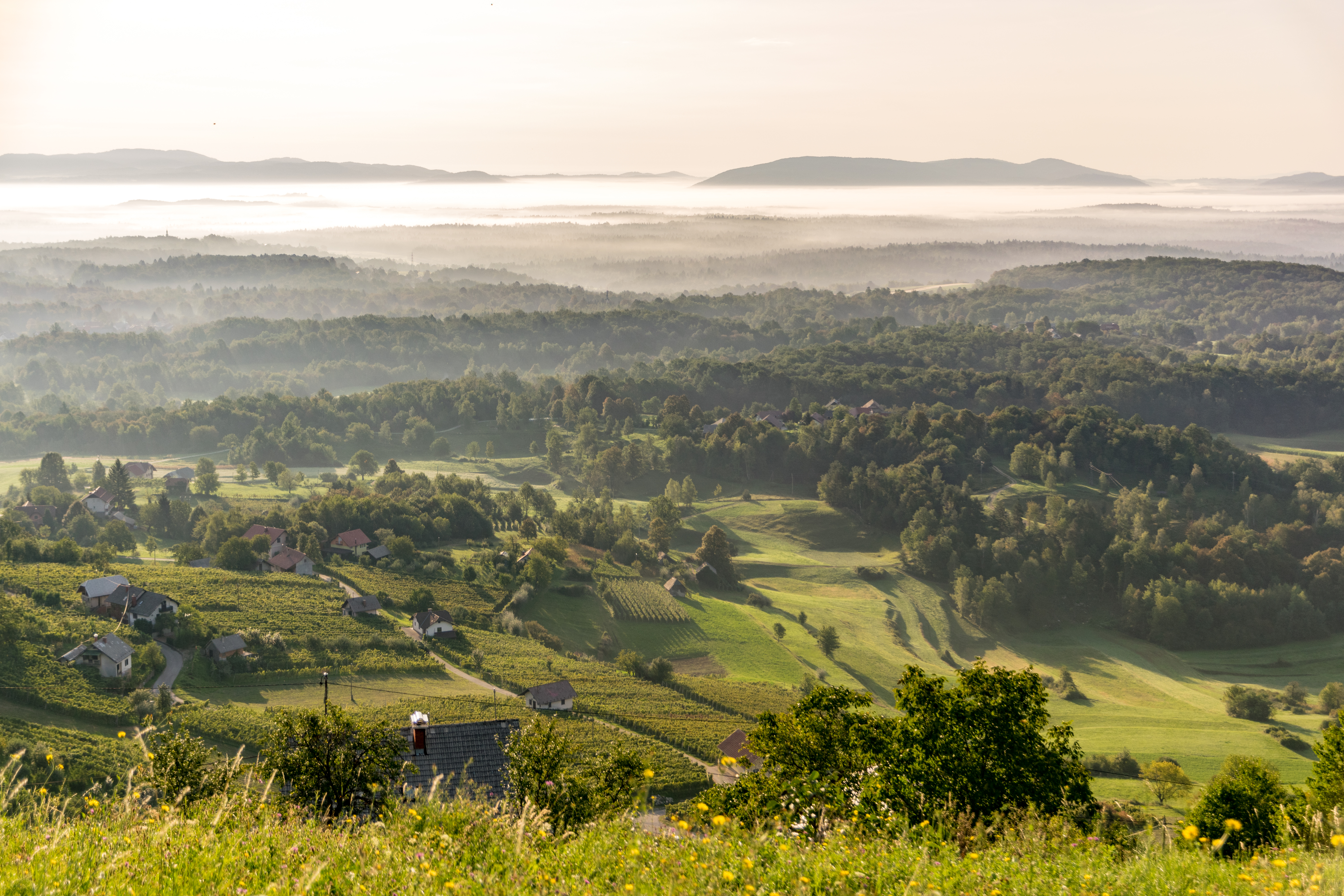
Typical landscape in White Carniola

The area is confined by the Gorjanci and Kočevski Rog mountain ranges in the north and west and the Kolpa River in the south and east, which also forms part of the border between Slovenia and Croatia. As the area could only be reached from northern Lower Carniola by mountain passes, the inhabitants cultivate a certain distinctness.

The region corresponds to the present-day municipalities of Metlika, Črnomelj and Semič. The terrain is characterised by low karst hills and extensive birch forests. The main river is the Kolpa with its Lahinja, Dobličica and Krupa tributaries.

White Carniola is known for Grič and Kanižarica pottery from clay with a distinct calcite content, as well as for high-quality wines, such as metliška črnina (a dark red wine), belokranjec (a white wine), and modra frankinja (i.e. Blaufränkisch).

== Tradition ==
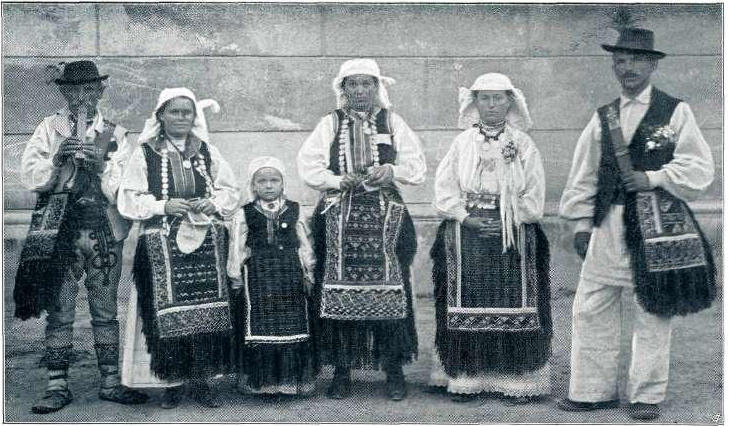
Peasants from White Carniola in traditional dress at the beginning of the 20th century

A distinguishing part of White Carniola is its folk heritage. It still has many folklore events, which show traditional local costumes, music, played on a regionally known instrument called tamburica, and a circle dance, called belokranjsko kolo.

A distinctive feature is also the pisanica, a coloured Easter egg decorated in a characteristic manner using beeswax that is found nowhere else in Slovenia. Belokranjska pogača (White Carniola flatbread) has recently been granted the European Union's Traditional Speciality Guaranteed designation.

A small Serb community exists in White Carniola. The presence of Serb and Croat heritage has also been preserved in surnames.

== Name ==
The name Bela krajina literally means 'White March'. The noun krajina or 'march' refers to a border territory organized for military defense. The adjective bela 'white' may refer to the deciduous trees (especially birch trees) in the area in comparison to "black" (i.e. coniferous) trees in the neighboring Kočevje area. It may also be an old designation for 'west', referring to the western location of the region in comparison to the Croatian Military Frontier (Slovene: Vojna krajina). Non-linguistic explanations connect the designation bela with the traditional white linen clothing of the population. The names Bela krajina and Belokranjci first emerged in the first half of the 19th century as the area was earlier (from at least the 13th century) known as Metlika. The English name White Carniola derives from the German designation Weißkrain, which is the result of a hypercorrection based on the adjective belokrajnski (understood as a dialect metathesis of *belokranjski) (cf. also German Dürrenkrain, English: Dry Carniola, for Slovene Suha krajina, literally 'dry region').

== History ==
=== Middle Ages ===
In the early 12th century, the area formed part of a disputed frontier between the March of Carniola, established by the Holy Roman Empire to the northwest, and the Kingdom of Hungary to the east and southeast. From around 1127, the local counts of Višnja Gora (Weichselberg), supported by the Spanheim margraves and the archbishops of Salzburg, crossed the Gorjanci Mountains and campaigned against Hungarian and Croatian forces. These forces were pushed beyond the Kolpa River as far as Bregana.

The Counts of Weichselberg, who claimed descent from Saint Hemma of Gurk, established their residence at Metlika (Möttling). Their territories were consequently referred to in contemporary sources as the County of Möttling, or Metlika. When the dynasty became extinct in 1209, its possessions passed to the Carniolan margraves of the House of Andechs, whose members styled themselves Dukes of Merania.

In 1229, the territory formed part of the dowry of Agnes of Merania upon her marriage to Frederick II of Austria, the last ruler of the House of Babenberg. After Frederick's death, it passed to Agnes's second husband, Ulrich of Spanheim, lord of Carniola and duke of Carinthia. When Ulrich died in 1269, his possessions were inherited by his cousin Ottokar II of Bohemia. Ottokar was defeated in 1278 by Holy Roman Emperor Rudolf of Habsburg and his allies.

Rudolf granted the County of Metlika as a fief to his ally Albert I of Gorizia, together with the eastern part of the neighbouring Windic March. Under Albert's descendant, Albert III of Gorizia, the two territories were united as the County in the (Windic) March and in Metlika. In 1368, it was formally recognised as a separate estate of the Holy Roman Empire.

After Albert's death in 1374, the county was acquired by Archduke Rudolf IV of Austria of the House of Habsburg. He confirmed its existing privileges and retained its administrative separation from the Duchy of Carniola. The county was subsequently leased to the House of Celje, which obtained full rights as lords of the land in 1443. It remained part of the Celje domains until the dynasty became extinct in 1457, after which it returned to the Habsburgs and was gradually incorporated into Carniola.

=== Early modern period ===
With the Ottoman conquest of the Balkans, groups of Serbs and Croats fled to the north or west; of the western migrational groups, some settled in White Carniola and Žumberak. Vlachs and Uskoks, including both ethnic Croats and Serbs, came to White Carniola and Žumberak from Croatia and Bosnia. The Habsburg commanders brought from Bosnia, later and from parts of Croatia and Dalmatia hundreds or thousands of families and settled them in area which covers White Carniola, across the Žumberak Mountains all the way to Vinica. In September 1597, with the fall of Slatina, some 1,700 Uskoks with their wives and children settled in Carniola, bringing some 4,000 sheep with them. The following year, with the conquest of Cernik, some 500 Uskok families settled in Carniola.

In his 1689 work The Glory of the Duchy of Carniola, the historian Johann Weikhard von Valvasor described the language, clothing, and customs of the people of White Carniola region as Croatian. The self-identification of students on the university registers in Graz and Vienna between 1643 and 1712 shows that as many as 88% of students from White Carniola identified as Croats, and only 12% as Carniolans. The provincial designation 'Croats' (Crovathen/Crobathen) was used for White Carniola in 1709, and the name 'Croats' for the inhabitants of White Carniola is found in 1725 in a report by a doctor named Zalokar from Novo Mesto. The dialect of the parish of Vinica in far southern White Carniola was marked as Croatian in 1795.

== Buildings ==
=== Castles ===
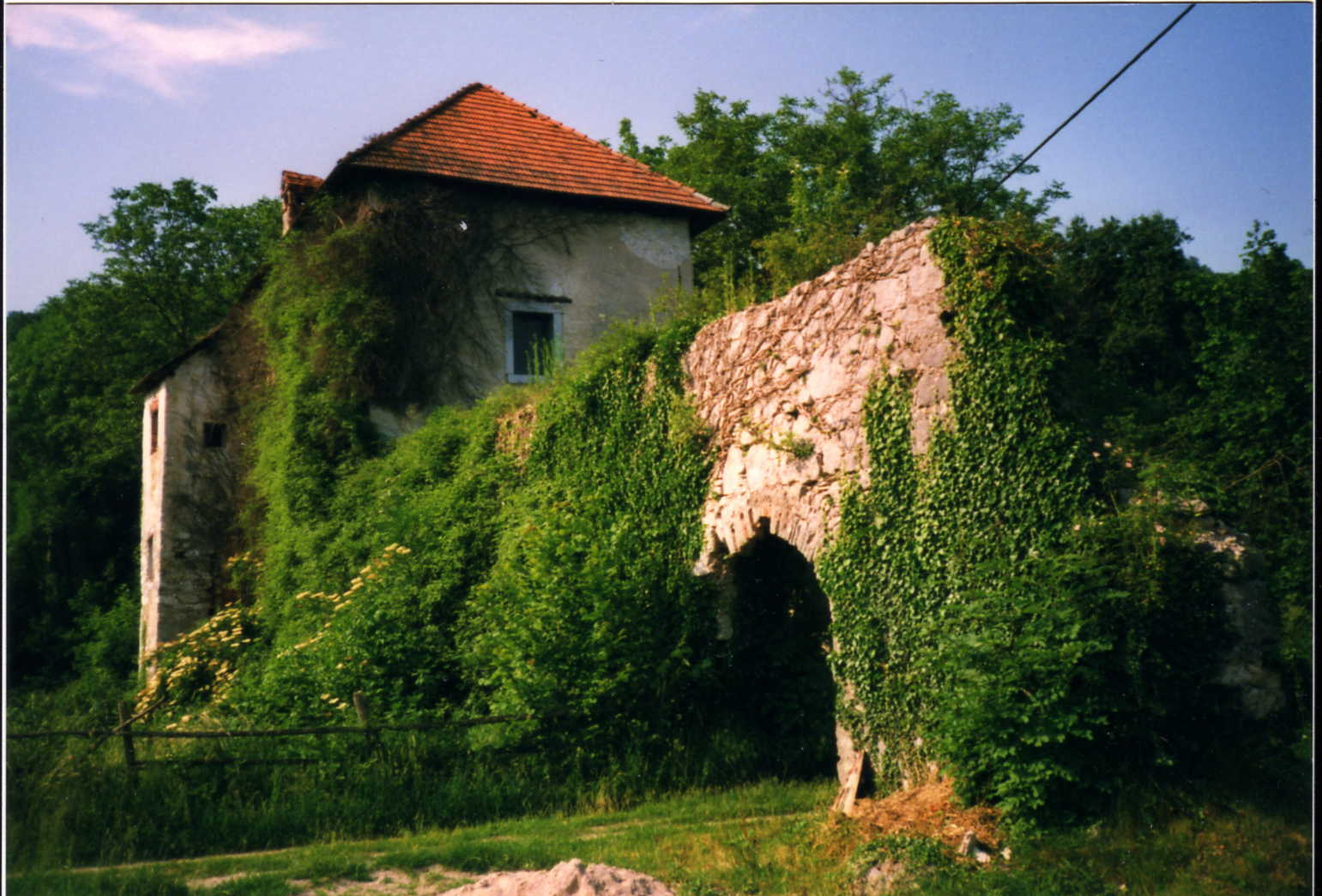
Ruins of Pobrežje Castle

Several castles were built in the border region, especially during the Ottoman Wars from the 15th century onwards, as in Črnomelj, Gradac and Vinica. The remains of the large fortress in Pobrežje were destroyed in World War II.

== Notable people ==
Notable people that were born or lived in White Carniola include:

- Juro Adlešič (1884–1968), lawyer and politician, mayor of Ljubljana from 1935 to 1942
- Draga Ahačič (1924–2022), actress, film director, translator, and journalist
- Andrej Bajuk (1943–2011), politician and economist
- Joe Cerne (born 1942), American football player
- Oton Gliha (1914–1999), Croatian painter
- Miran Jarc (1900–1942), writer, poet, playwright, and essayist
- Lojze Krakar (1926–1995), poet, translator, editor, literary historian, and essayist
- Radko Polič (1942–2022), actor
- John Stariha (1845–1915), first Bishop of Lead, South Dakota, serving from 1902 to 1909
- John Vertin (1844–1899), Catholic priest, Bishop of Marquette in the US state of Michigan from 1879 to 1899
- Oton Župančič (1878–1949), poet, playwright, and translator
