= Mithras of Fiano Romano =

Bas-relief of scenes of the cult of Mithras

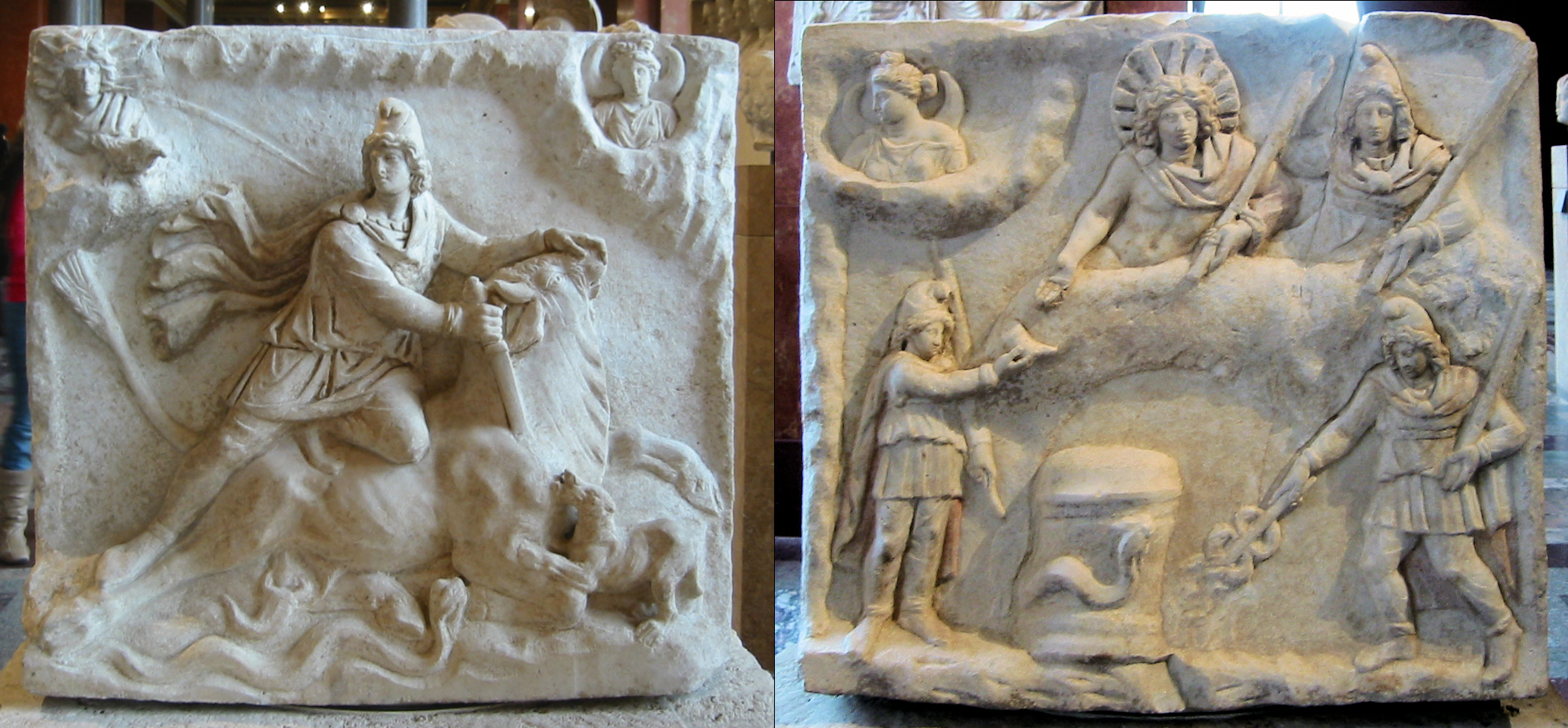
The Mithras of Fiano Romano at the Louvre in Paris

The Mithras of Fiano Romano (Italian: Mitra di Fiano Romano) is a bas-relief dated between the 2nd and 3rd century AD depicting typical scenes of the cult of Mithras and now preserved at the Louvre in Paris.

== History ==
The bas-relief was found during a campaign of research and archaeological excavations in Fiano Romano in 1926 "placed in a small brick container", where it must have been intentionally hidden to protect it from the outrages of the enemies of paganism, and this has allowed an excellent conservation.

It came into the possession of the historian Franz Cumont, who dated it between the beginning of the 2nd century and the end of the 3rd century AD, and in 1939 it was acquired by the Louvre Museum in Paris where it is kept in the Department of Greek, Etruscan and Roman Antiquities with number of catalog MA 3441.

== Description ==
The bas-relief, made of marble on a base of travertine, is quadrangular in shape, with a height of 61 centimetres (24 in), a width of 68 centimetres (27 in) and 23 centimetres (9.1 in) thick.

On both faces of the bas-relief are represented, with an excellent artistic workmanship far superior to that of the usual Mithraic sculptures, the typical scenes of the cult of Mithras:

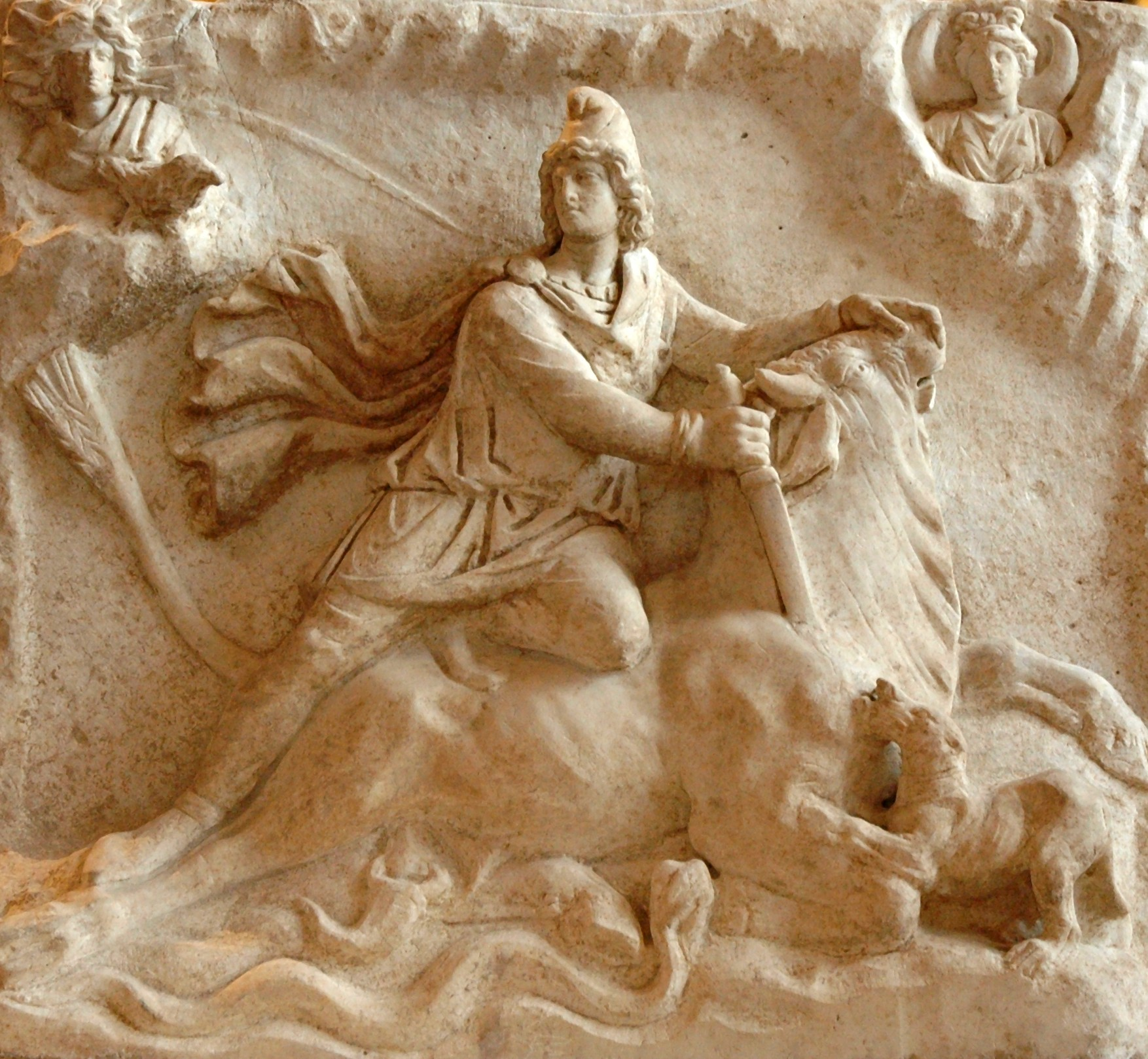
Obverse of the bas-relief: the tauroctony

- On the obverse there is the tauroctony that is the ritual and symbolic killing of a bull by the god Mithras. In detail: Mithras killing the bull, whose tail ends in a bundle of ears. There are the dog, the snake, the scorpion and the crow. The upper corners are occupied by a rocky vault, from which the dressed busts of the god Sol and the Luna goddess emerge. The Luna goddess has a crescent behind her shoulders while the god Sol has a crown of twelve rays around her head and another ray that stretches in the direction of Mithras.

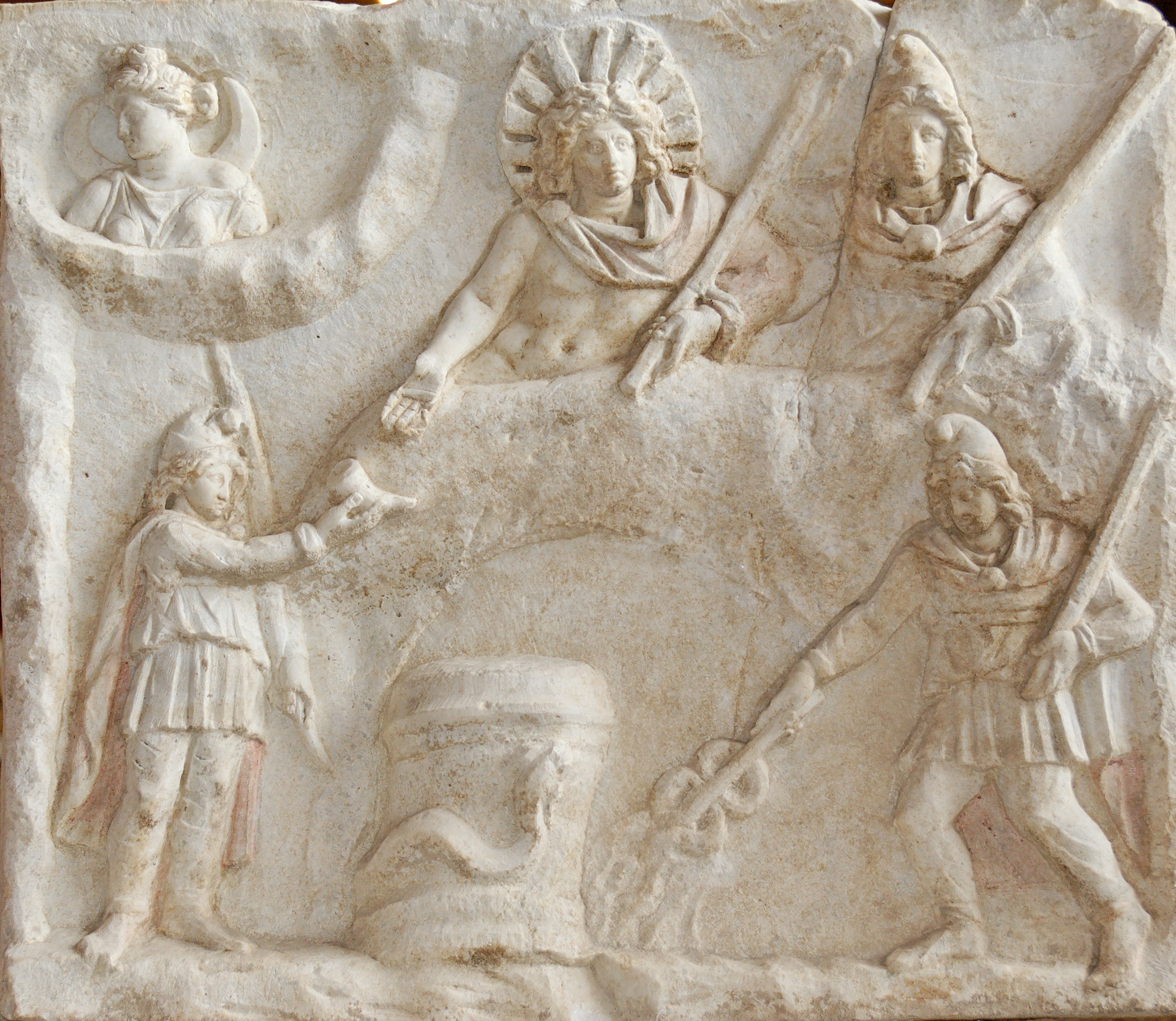
Reverse of the bas-relief: the mithraic banquet

- On the reverse is represented the Mithraic banquet with the god Mithras, the god Sol, the goddess Luna and Mitra's assistants Cautes and Cautopates.In detail: in the center a bull skin, of which the head and a hind leg are clearly visible. The god Sol and Mitra are lying on it side by side. Mithras in oriental clothing, holding a long torch in his left hand and stretching his right behind the god Sol, dressed only in a short cloak tied on the right shoulder by a fibula. Around the head of the god Sol a halo and a crown of eleven rays. He holds a whip in his left hand and extends his other hand to a torch-bearer, who stands before him and offers him a rhyton. Another torch-bearer, dressed in oriental clothes like his companion, and with a raised torch in his left hand, holds a caduceus in his right hand which, pointed at the ground, releases water or fire. Next to it an altar in the coils of a crested snake. In the upper left corner a cloud-like semicircle, in which the dressed bust of the Luna goddess with a crescent behind her shoulders, looking away from the scene. There are traces of red paint on the clothing of the torch-bearers and of the recumbent characters.

Starting from the 1st century BC and up to the 4th century AD Mithraism was very widespread and relevant in Roman Empire and, although the mystery character of this religion, many are the finds found but the Mithras of Fiano Romano, both for its completeness and complexity of the symbolism reported that for the artistic quality of the work, as well as for the excellent conservation, it is one of the best, so much so that Cumont defined it "an exceptional representation, which distinguishes it from ordinary images, so numerous, of the god of tauroctony".

== Bibliography ==
- Vermaseren, M. J. (1956). "Italia". Corpus inscriptionum et monumentorum religionis Mithriacae. Springer. pp. 99–268. doi:10.1007/978-94-015-0512-3_5. ISBN 978-94-015-0039-5.
- Cumont, Franz (1946). "Un bas-relief mithriaque du Louvre". Revue Archéologique (in French) (25). Presses Universitaires de France: 183–195. ISSN 0035-0737.
