= Rožanec =

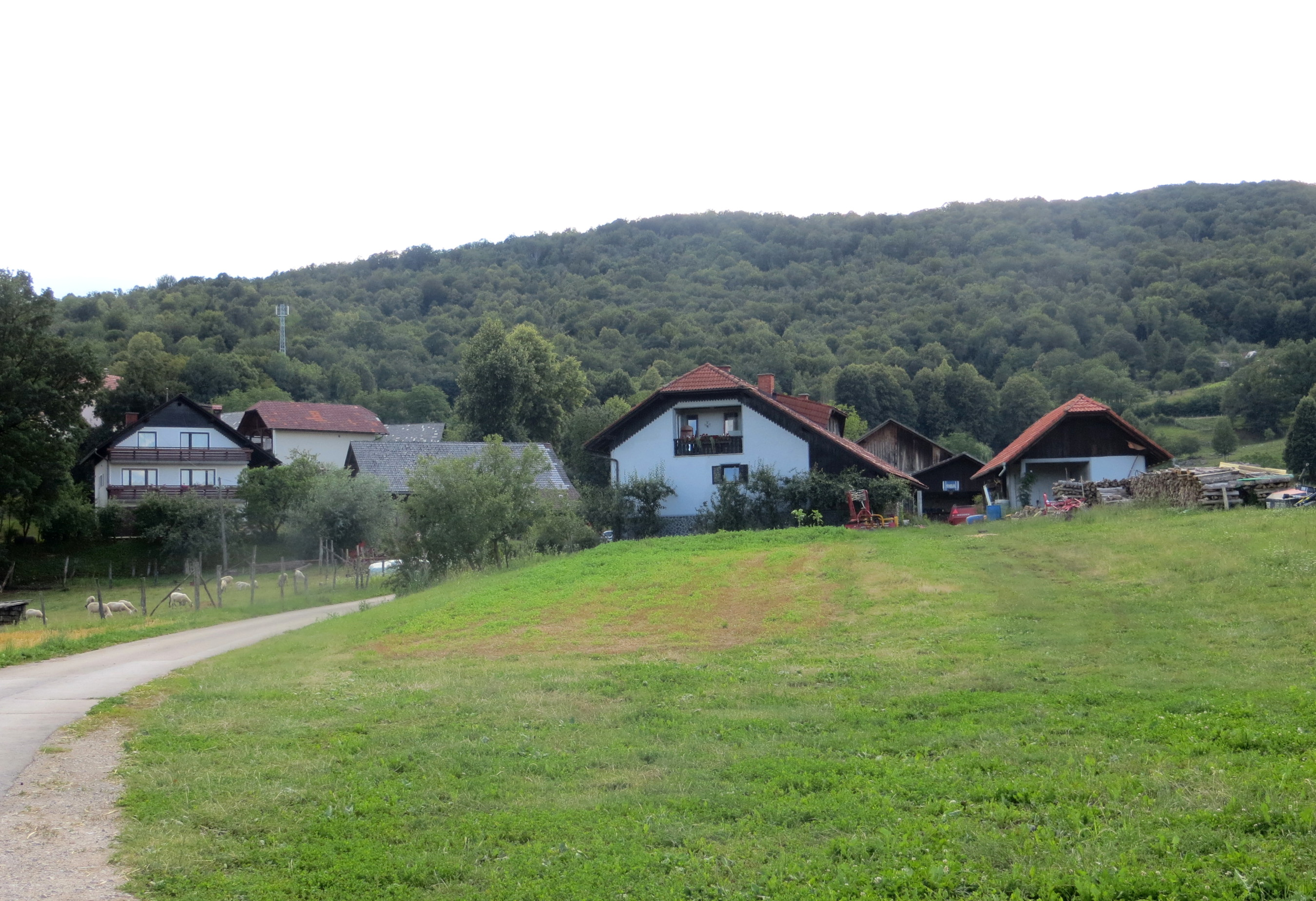

- Location in Slovenia
- Coordinates: 45°36′25.92″N 15°9′53″E
- Country: Slovenia
- Traditional region: White Carniola
- Statistical region: Southeast Slovenia
- Municipality: Črnomelj

Area
  - Total: 1.08 km^{2} (0.42 sq mi)
- Elevation: 194.7 m (639 ft)

Population (2020)
  - Total: 55
  - Density: 51/km^{2} (130/sq mi)
- Postal code: 8340

Rožanec (pronounced [ɾɔˈʒaːnəts]) is a settlement north of the town of Črnomelj in the White Carniola area of southeastern Slovenia. The area is part of the traditional region of Lower Carniola and is now included in the Southeast Slovenia Statistical Region.

== Church ==
The local church, built southeast of the village, is dedicated to Saint George (Slovene: sveti Jurij) and belongs to the Parish of Črnomelj. It was first mentioned in written documents dating to 1526, but it has Romanesque features, indicating that it is likely to be an earlier structure.

== Mithraeum ==
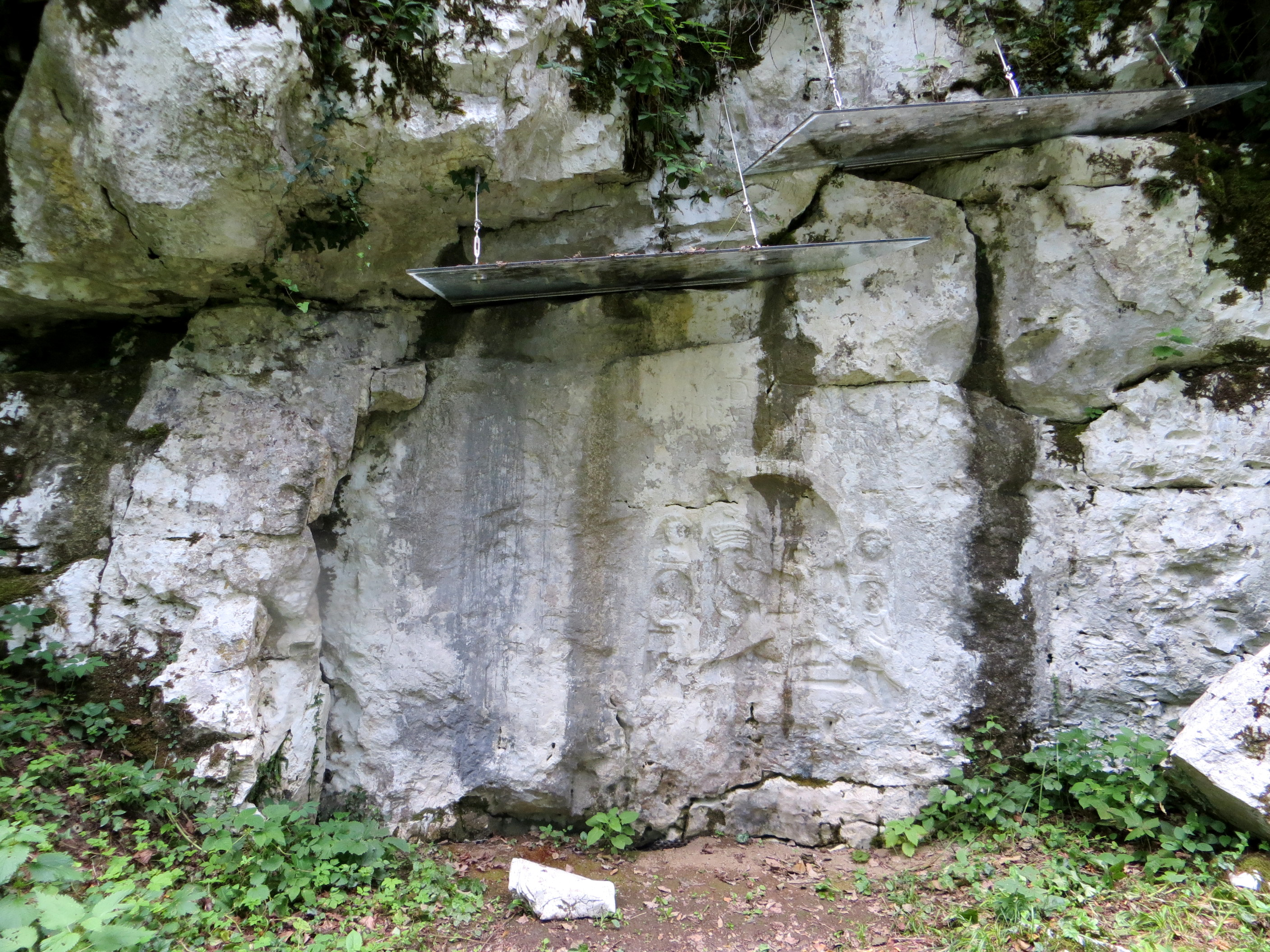
Mithraeum site

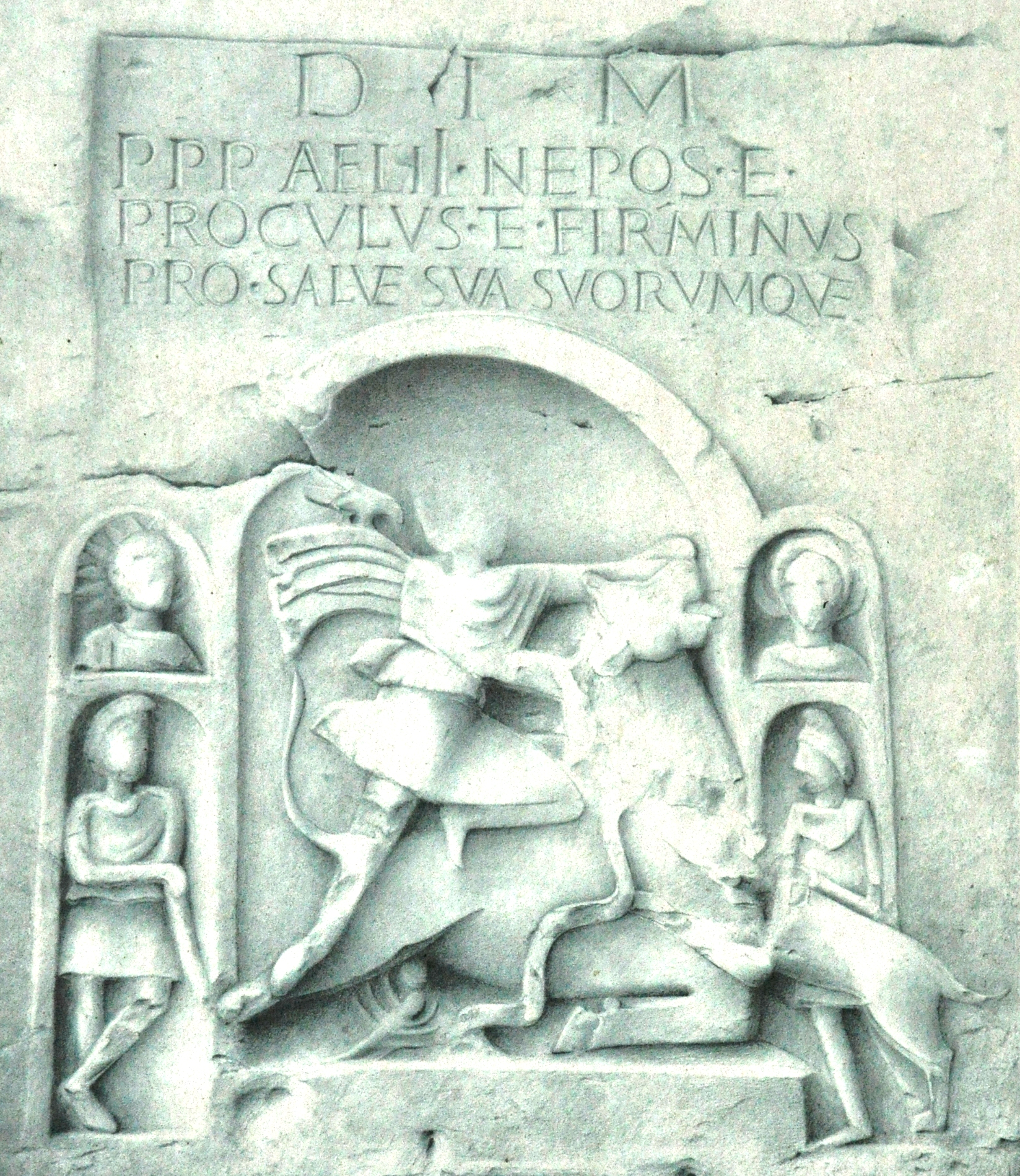
Reconstruction

The Rožanec Mithraeum

In an abandoned quarry below the church an ancient relief of the god Mithras sacrificing a bull, with the cult characteristic images of Cautes and Cautopates, Sol, a scorpion, a snake, a dog, and a raven, indicate this was the site of a late second-century Mithraeum.
