= Tauroctony =

Roman mystery cult doctrine

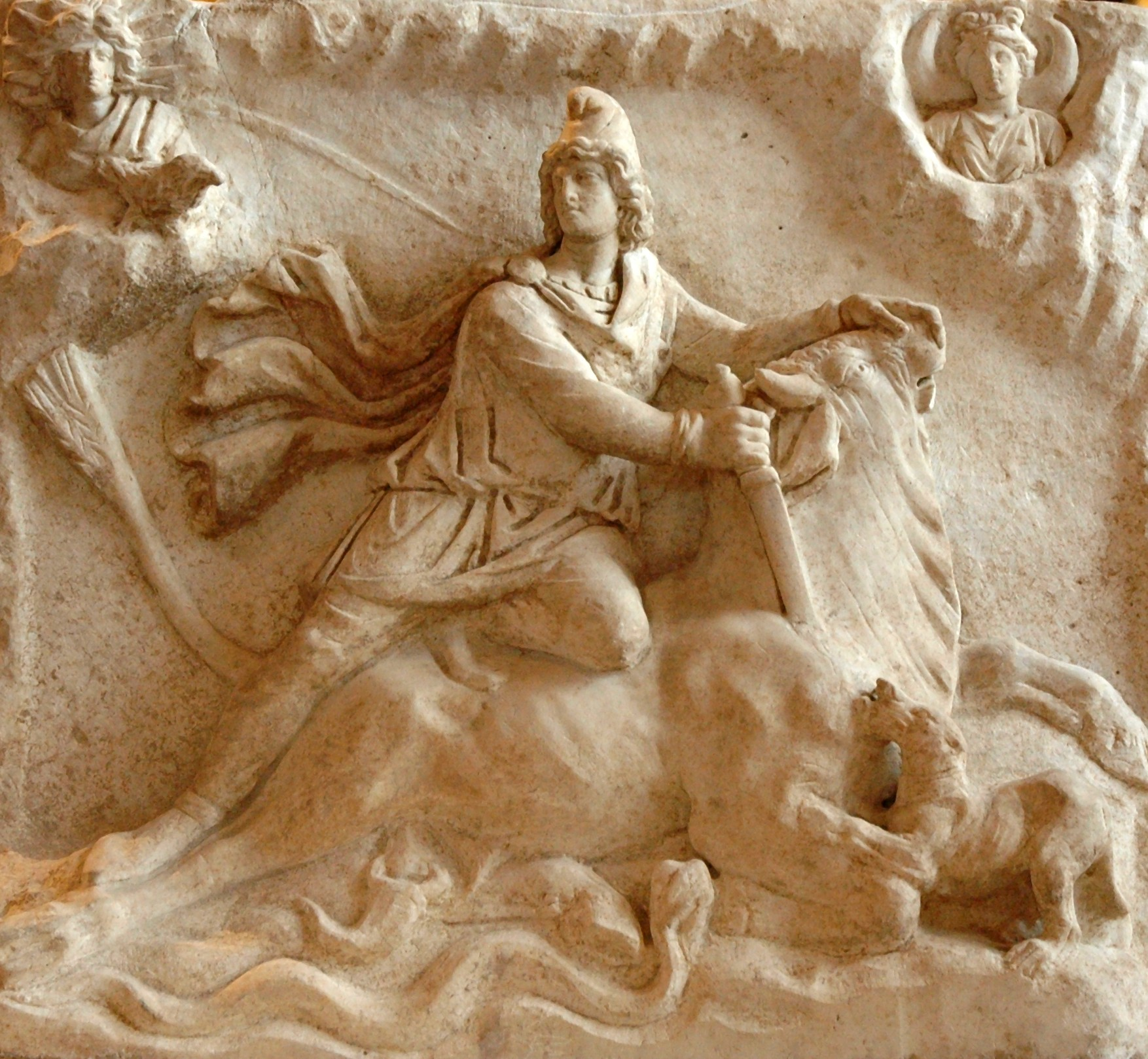
CIMRM 641: Tauroctony scene on side A of a two-sided Roman bas-relief. 2nd or 3rd century, found at Fiano Romano, near Rome, now on display in the Louvre. In the upper corners are Helios with the raven, and Luna.

Tauroctony is a modern name given to the central cult reliefs of the Mithraic Mysteries in the Roman Empire. The imagery depicts Mithras killing a bull, hence the name tauroctony after the Greek word tauroktonos (ταυροκτόνος, "bull killer"). A tauroctony is distinct from the sacrifice of a bull in ancient Rome called a taurobolium; the taurobolium was mainly part of the unrelated cult of Cybele. (Note: The tauroctony should not be confused with a "taurobolium", which was an actual bull-killing cult act performed by initiates of the Mysteries of Magna Mater (Cybele), and has nothing to do with the Mithraic Mysteries. "There is no evidence that [initiates of the Mithraic mysteries] ever performed such a rite [i.e. a real bull killing], and a priori considerations suggest that a mithraeum – any mithraeum – would be a most impractical place to attempt it.")

Despite the name, the scene is symbolic, and to date there is no known physical evidence that patrons of the Roman cult ever performed such a rite. Like all Greco-Roman mysteries, the Mithraic Mysteries was limited to initiates, and there is very little known about the cult's beliefs or practices. Several images of the bull include a dorsuale ribbon or blanket, which was a Roman convention to identify a sacrificial animal, so it is fairly certain that the killing of the bull represents a sacrificial act.

Because the main bull-killing scene is often accompanied by explicit depictions of the sun, moon, and stars, it is also fairly certain that the scene has astrological connotations. Despite dozens of theories on the subject, none has received widespread acceptance. While the basic bull-killing image appears to have been adopted from a similar depiction of Nike, and it is certain that the bull-killing symbolism and the ancillary elements together tell a story (i.e. the cult myth, the cult's mystery, told only to initiates), that story has been lost and is now unknown. Following several decades of increasingly convoluted theories, Mithraic scholarship is now generally disinclined to speculation.

== Art ==
=== Introduction ===
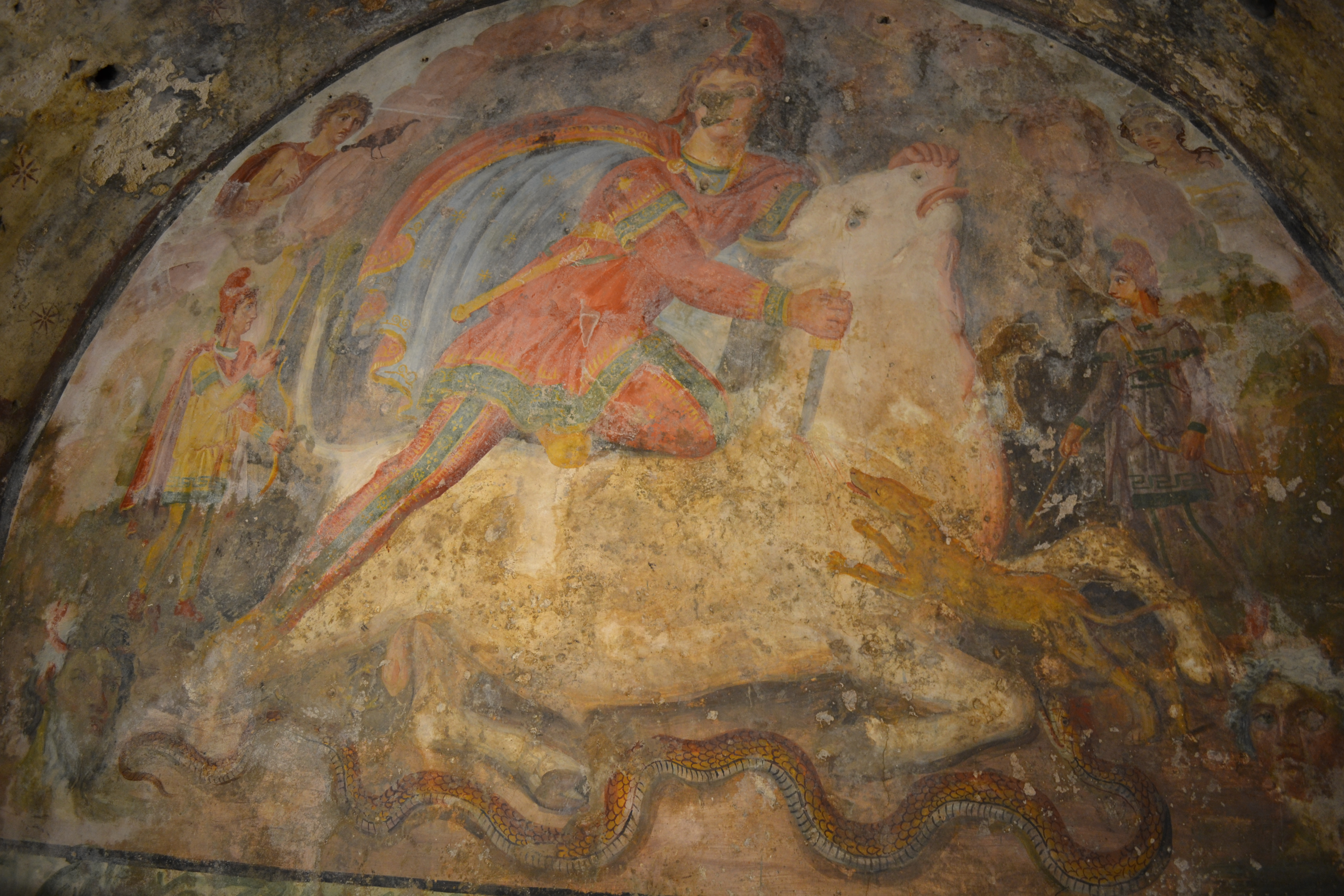
CIMRM 181: Tauroctony fresco in the mithraeum of Santa Maria Capua Vetere, 2nd century.

Whether as a painting or as carved monument, a depiction of the tauroctony scene belonged to the standard furniture of every mithraeum. At least one depiction would be mounted on the wall at the far end of the space where ritual activity took place, often in a niche dressed to be especially cavelike. Richly furnished mithraea, such as one in Stockstadt am Main, had multiple cult reliefs.

The scenes can be roughly divided into two groups. The "simple" depictions, which include just the main bull-killing scene, and the compound depictions, in which the tauroctony is the central and largest element, but which is framed by panels that portray other scenes.

The oldest known representative of the tauroctony scene is CIMRM 593/594 from Rome, a dedication of a certain Alcimus, slave steward/bailiff (servus vilicus) of T. Claudius Livianus, who is identified with T. Iulius Aquilinus Castricius Saturninus Claudius Livianus, the praetorian prefect under Trajan. Like the other five earliest monuments of the Mithraic mysteries, it dates to around 100 CE.

=== Mithras with the bull ===
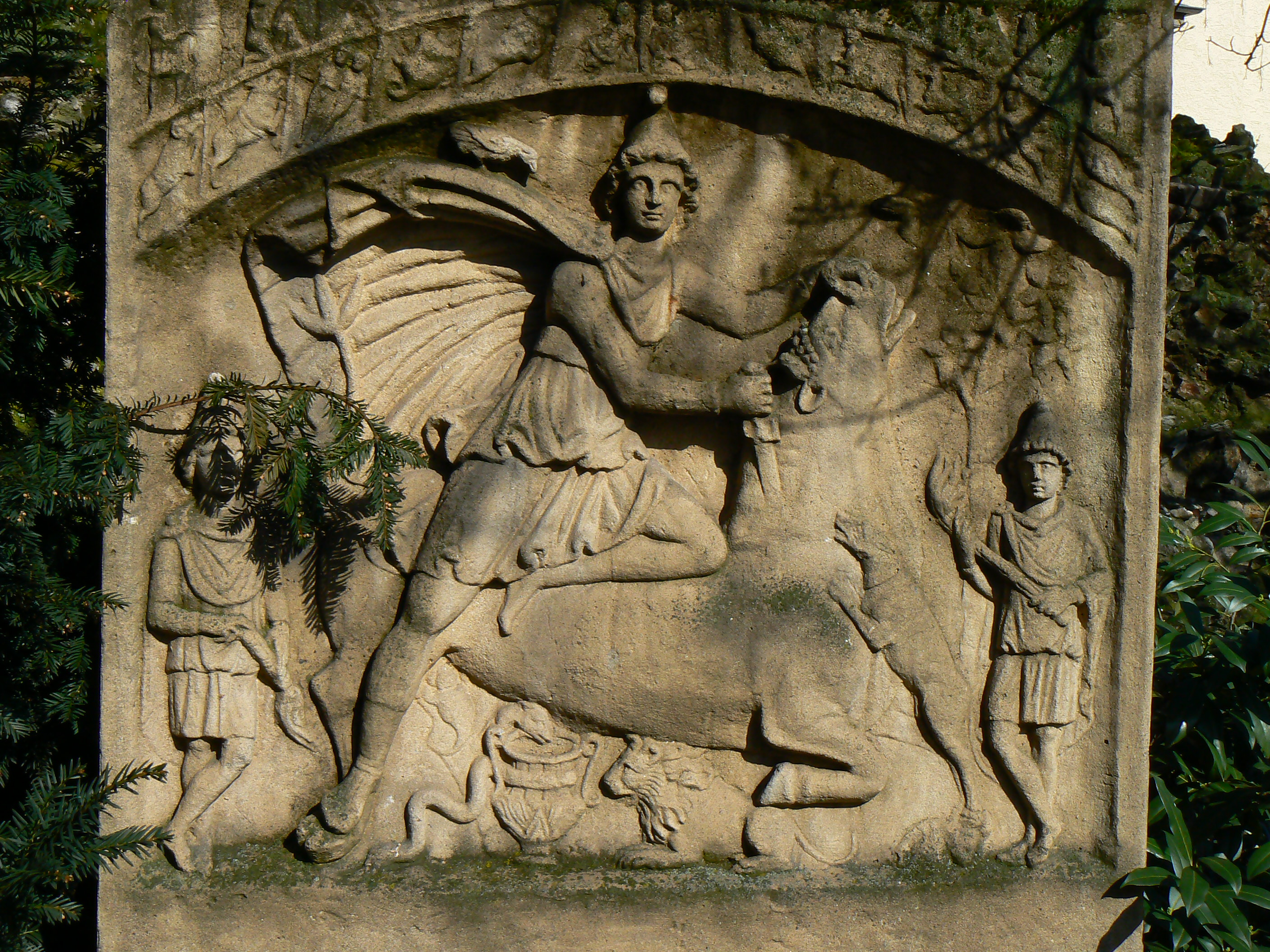
CIMRM 1083: Tauroctony relief from the "Heidenfeld" Mithraeum (Mithraeum I, Heddernheim, Germany), now in Wiesbaden. An extensive description is available at this image's Wikipedia commons page.

Although there are numerous minor variations, the basic features of the central tauroctony scene is highly uniform: Mithras half-straddles a bull that has been forced to the ground. The bull invariably appears in profile, facing to his left, the viewers’ right. In original un-reconstructed depictions, Mithras invariably has his head turned away from the bull. In many he is looking back over his right shoulder up to Sol. Statuary that shows Mithras looking at the bull are the result of Renaissance-era restorations of monuments that were missing a head.

The bull is held down by Mithras' left leg, which is bent at an angle and the knee of which presses down on the bull's spine. The bull's rump and right hind leg is restrained by Mithras' right leg, which is almost fully extended.

With his left hand, Mithras pulls back the head of the bull by the nostrils or the muzzle (never by the horns, which – if at all represented – are short). In his right hand, Mithras usually holds a knife or short sword plunged into the neck/shoulder of the bull. Alternatively (CIMRM 2196), the knife is sticking into the bull's neck, and Mithras has his arm raised as if in triumph. Mithras is usually dressed in a knee-length long-sleeved tunic (tunica manicata), closed boots and breeches (anaxyrides, bracae). Mithras' cape, if he wears one, is usually spread open, as if flying. Occasionally, Mithras is nude (CIMRM 2196, 2327; 201; 1275). On his head, Mithras usually wears a phrygian cap, like the one worn by Attis. The tail of the bull occasionally appears to end in an ear of wheat. The blood from the wound is also sometimes depicted as ears of wheat, or as a cluster of grapes.

Several cult images have the bull adorned with the Roman dorsuale, sometimes decorated with embroidery. This dorsal band or blanket placed on the back of the animal is an adoption from the then-contemporary images of public sacrifice, and identifies the bull as a sacrificial beast.

From traces of pigment found on some reliefs it seems that there was no particular coloring tradition that was followed. In the relief from Jajce (CIMRM 1902), the bull is black, while Mithras' tunic is blue and his cloak red. In the relief from Marino and the wall fresco from Capua Vetere (CIMRM 181), the bull is white. At Marino, Mithras' the tunic is red and the cloak blue. In a stucco group now in Frankfurt but originally from Rome (CIMRM 430), the animal is reddish brown. In the relief from the Barbarini mithraeum (CIMRM 390), the bull is light brown and Mithras' tunic and trousers are green.

=== Artistic model ===
"The model for the Mithraic bull-killing scene was probably the type of winged Nike (Victory) killing the bull, which became a fashionable image once again in the reign of Trajan." The similarity is so great that Cumont mistook CIMRM 25 from near Baris to be related to the Mysteries. This was subsequently corrected by Vermaseren and others as being of Nike. Already in 1899, Cumont had identified the tauroctony as "the imitation of the motif of the classical Greek group of Nike sacrificing a bull", but supposed that both tauroctony scenes were attributable to 2nd century BCE Pergamene artistic traditions. This notion has been characterized as one of Cumont's "least happy hypotheses".

=== Ancillary elements ===
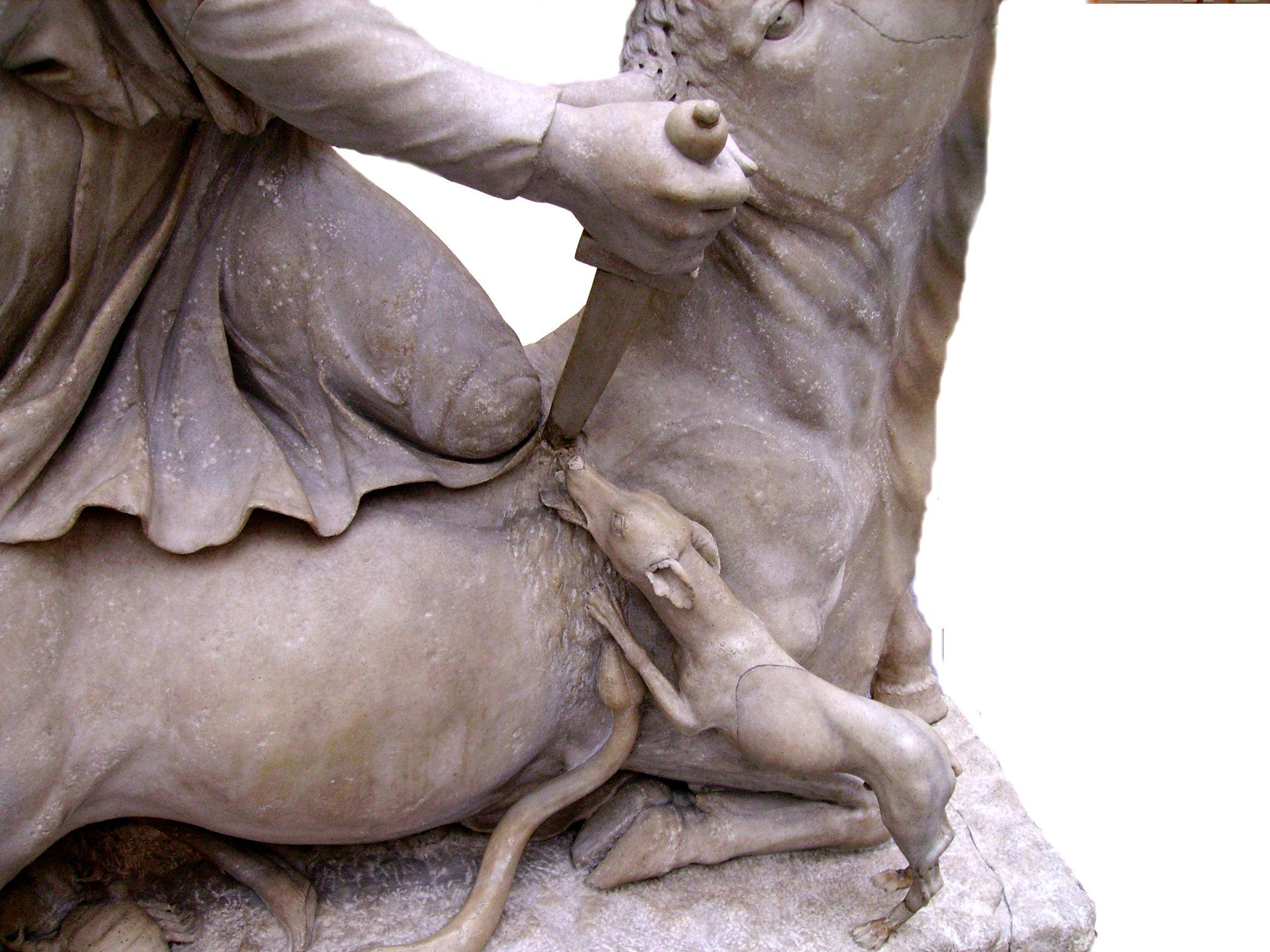
Detail of CIMRM 593: dog and serpent set at the bull's wound.

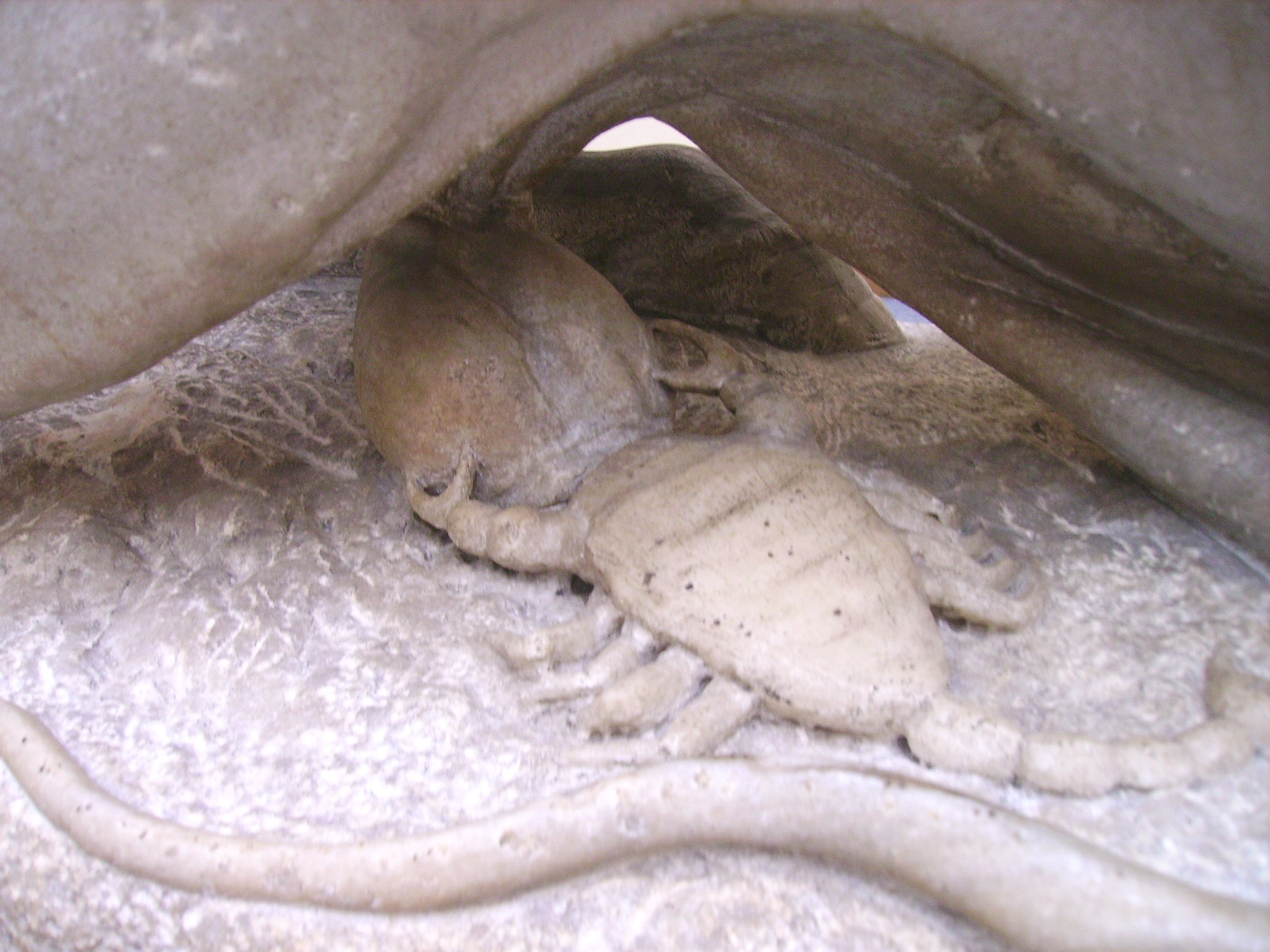
Detail of CIMRM 593: scorpion heading for the bull's testicles.

Usually a canid, commonly identified as a dog, a serpent and a scorpion also appear in most tauroctony scenes; the dog and serpent are typically set as reaching for the wound, while a scorpion is typically set at the genitals of the dying bull. Many reliefs also include a bird, commonly identified as a raven, somewhere in the scene. Not infrequently, particularly in reliefs from the Rhine and Danube frontiers, the tauroctony scenes include a chalice and a lion.

Seldom absent from the reliefs, and also sometimes included in free-standing tauroctony statuary, are representations of Cautes and Cautopates, the torchbearering twins that appear as miniature versions of Mithras, respectively holding a raised torch and a lowered torch. Usually, Cautes stands to the right of the scene while Cautopates on the left. In fifty tauroctony scenes, their positions are reversed, and in rare cases, such as the very earliest CIMRM 593, they are both on one side of the scene. The torchbearers commonly appear with crossed legs. On a number of reliefs, greenery or a tree is placed in the vicinity, sometimes on both sides of the bull, and at other times, such as at Nida (Germany) as a wreath around the relief. As Siscia in Pannonia Superior (Sisak, Croatia) a similar wreath is made of ears of wheat (CIMRM 1475).

The signs of the twelve zodiacal constellations (Note: Cancer, Leo, Virgo, Libra, Scorpius, Sagittarius, Capricorn, Aquarius, Pisces, Aries, Taurus, Gemini) and allusions to seven classical planets (Note: In Greco-Roman times the Sun and Moon were categorized as "planets".) are common in the tauroctony reliefs and frescoes. The tauroctony reliefs (but not the statuary) almost always include busts of Sol and Luna, i.e. respectively the god of the Sun and the goddess of the Moon, which appear in respectively the left and right top corners of the scene. The more ambitious cult images include the Sun's horse-drawn quadriga mounting upwards on the left, while Luna's oxen-driven biga descends on the right. In these, Sol's chariot is preceded by the naked youth Phosphorus, who runs ahead with a raised torch. Luna's chariot is preceded by Hesperus, with lowered torch. The two youths are reminiscent of Cautes and Cautopates.

Sol, Luna, and the other five planetary gods (Note: Saturn, Mars, Mercury, Jupiter, Venus) are also sometimes represented as stars in Mithras' outspread cloak, or scattered in the background. The seven planetary gods are also fairly commonly represented by the depiction of seven altars (Note: e.g. CIMRM 40, 1275, 1818, 2245) or less commonly in anthropomorphic form, as busts or full-length. Several of the more detailed reliefs even seem to have the planetary gods placed in order of their week-day dedications, (Note: from right to left, Monday / day 2: Luna, Tuesday: Mars, Wednesday: Mercury, Thursday:Jupiter, Friday: Venus, Saturday / day 7: Saturn, Sunday / day 1: Sol) but no standard sequence is discernible.

As first identified by Karl Bernhard Stark in 1879 but unexplored until the dismantling of the Cumontian transfer scenario in the 1970s, all the other elements of the tauroctony scene except Mithras himself have obvious astral correlations too. The constellations of Taurus (bull) and Scorpius (scorpion) (Note: On the role of the scorpion in the tauroctony, and its association with ideas widely current in Greco-Roman thought, see Beck 1976c, pp. 208–209) are on opposite points of the zodiac, and between them lies a narrow band of the sky in which the constellations of the canine (Canis Major/Minor or Lupus), snake (Hydra, but not Serpens or Draco), the twins (Gemini), raven (Corvus), cup (Crater), lion (Leo), and the star of the 'wheat ear' (Spica, Alpha Virginis) appeared in the summers of the late first century. Simultaneously, as Porphyry's description of the mysteries states, "the Moon is also known as a bull and Taurus is its 'exaltation'"

Beginning with Cumont, who held the astral symbolism, and all the other Greco-Roman elements in the mysteries, to be merely a late, superficial and adventitious accretion, "most Mithraic scholars" have treated the correspondences between elements of the tauroctony and the constellations as coincidental or trivial. But the chance that these correlations are an accidental unintended coincidence is "improbable in the extreme". The chance that the correlations were intentional, but added incoherently and unsystematically, is also "statistically negligible". At the same time, the elements of the tauroctony scene all belong to the story that the designer of the scene wished to tell, and the bull is present primarily because Mithras kills one, not primarily because the bull is Taurus and/or the moon.

Occasionally, the busts of two or four wind gods are found in the corners of the cult reliefs. The figures of other protective gods (Note: e.g. Juno-Hera, Oceanus, Hercules, Vulcan, etc.) also sometimes appear.

== Interpretation ==
Other than that the killing of the bull is a sacrificial act – as identifiable from reliefs where the bull is adorned with a dorsuale – the function and purpose of the tauroctony is uncertain. Since the tauroctony scenes are complemented by the cult meal scenes (sometimes even represented on two sides of the same monument), it may be that the killing is a salvific act; i.e. "[s]laughter and feast together effect the salvation of the faithful."

=== Traditional Cumontian view ===
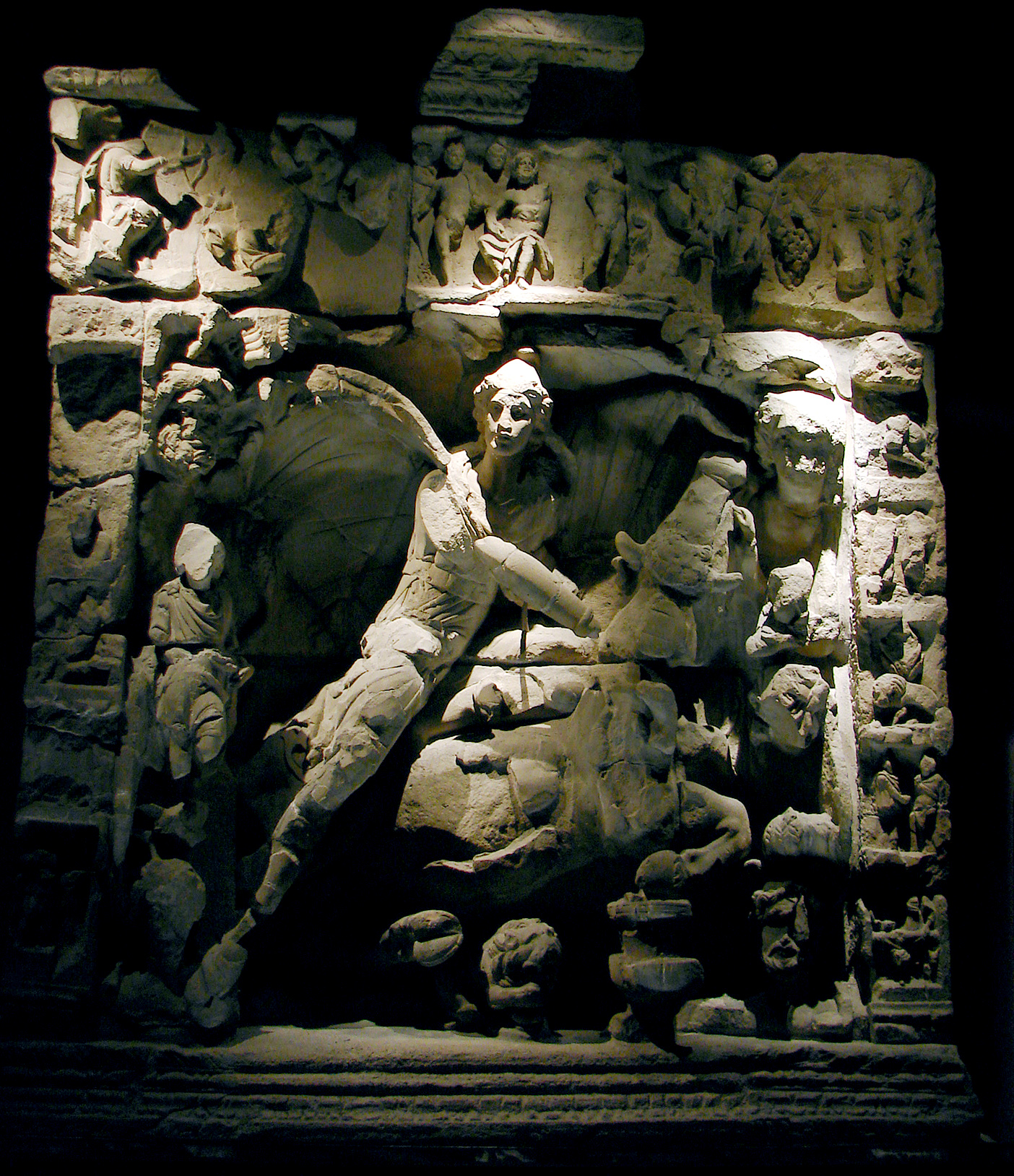
CIMRM 966(v.I): Tauroctony bas-relief from the Sarrebourg mithraeum (Pons Saravi, Gallia Belgica). Now at the Cour d'Or Museum, Metz, France.

Within the framework of the Cumontian supposition that the Mithraic mysteries was the "Roman form of Mazdaism", the traditional view held that the tauroctony represented Zoroastrianism's cosmological myth of the killing of a primordial bovine. The myth is recounted in the Bundahishn, a 9th-century AD Zoroastrian text.

In the myth, the evil spirit Ahriman, not Mithras, slays the primordial creature Gavaevodata which is represented as a bovine. Into this tale, Cumont interpolated the unwilling hand of Avestan Mithra on command of the Sun, speculating that there must have once existed a tale in which Mithra takes the role that the texts assign to Ahriman. This Cumontian characterization of Iranian Mithra has long been discarded as "not merely unsupported by Iranian texts" but is "actually in serious conflict with known Iranian theology", given Mithra's role in Iranian scripture as a "guardian of livestock", and whose stock epithet is "protector of pastures". Simply put: unlike Roman Mithras, Iranian Mithra does not do any bull-killing.

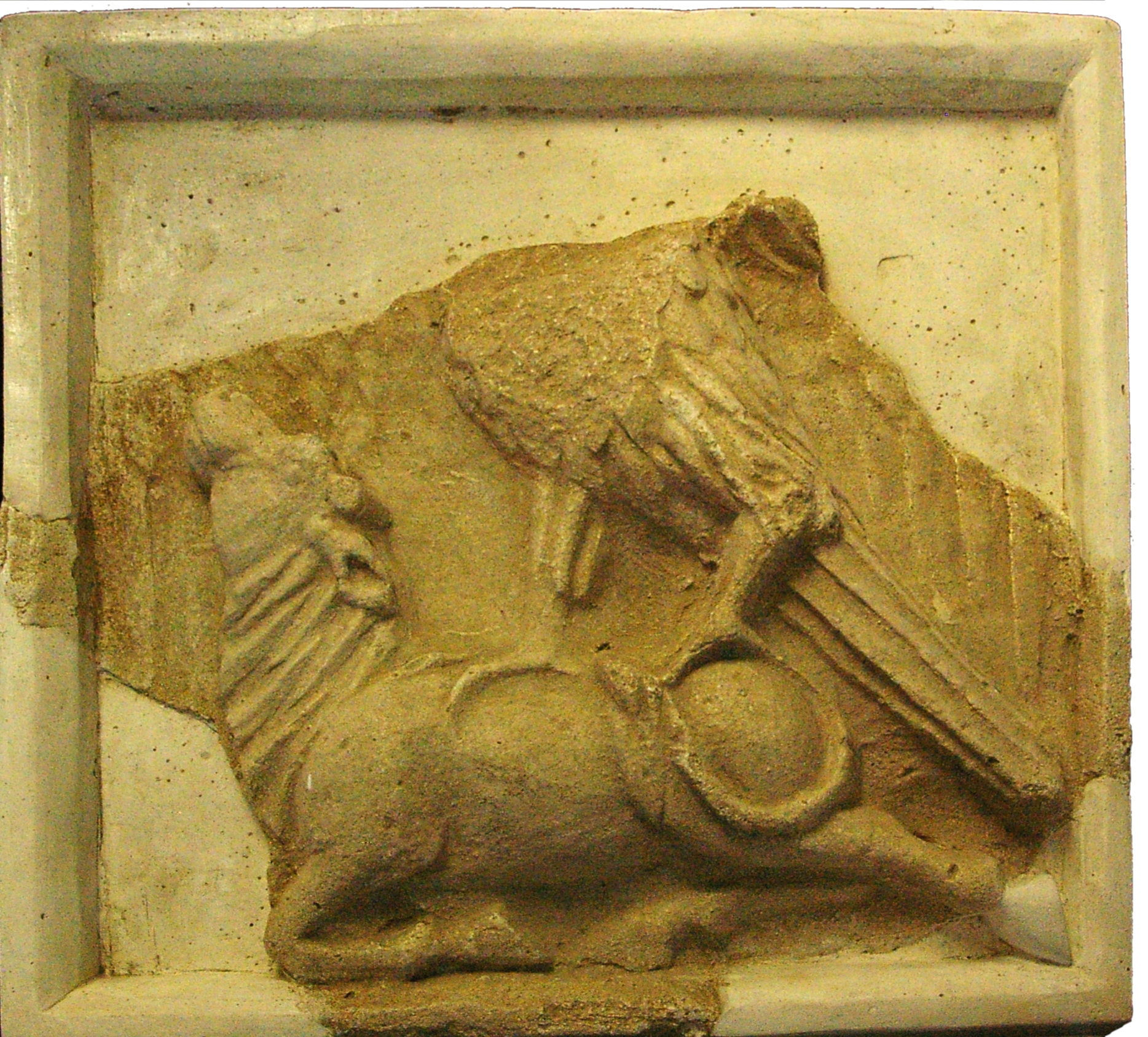
A Parthian relief of a bird on back of a bull, Zahhak Castle, East Azerbaijan, Iran. Similar relief is found on a Parthian belt buckle.

Recently, the iconographic reliefs of a bird and a bull, which are found in Iran, have been compared to the tauroctony by Iranian scholars.

=== Modern astrological interpretations ===
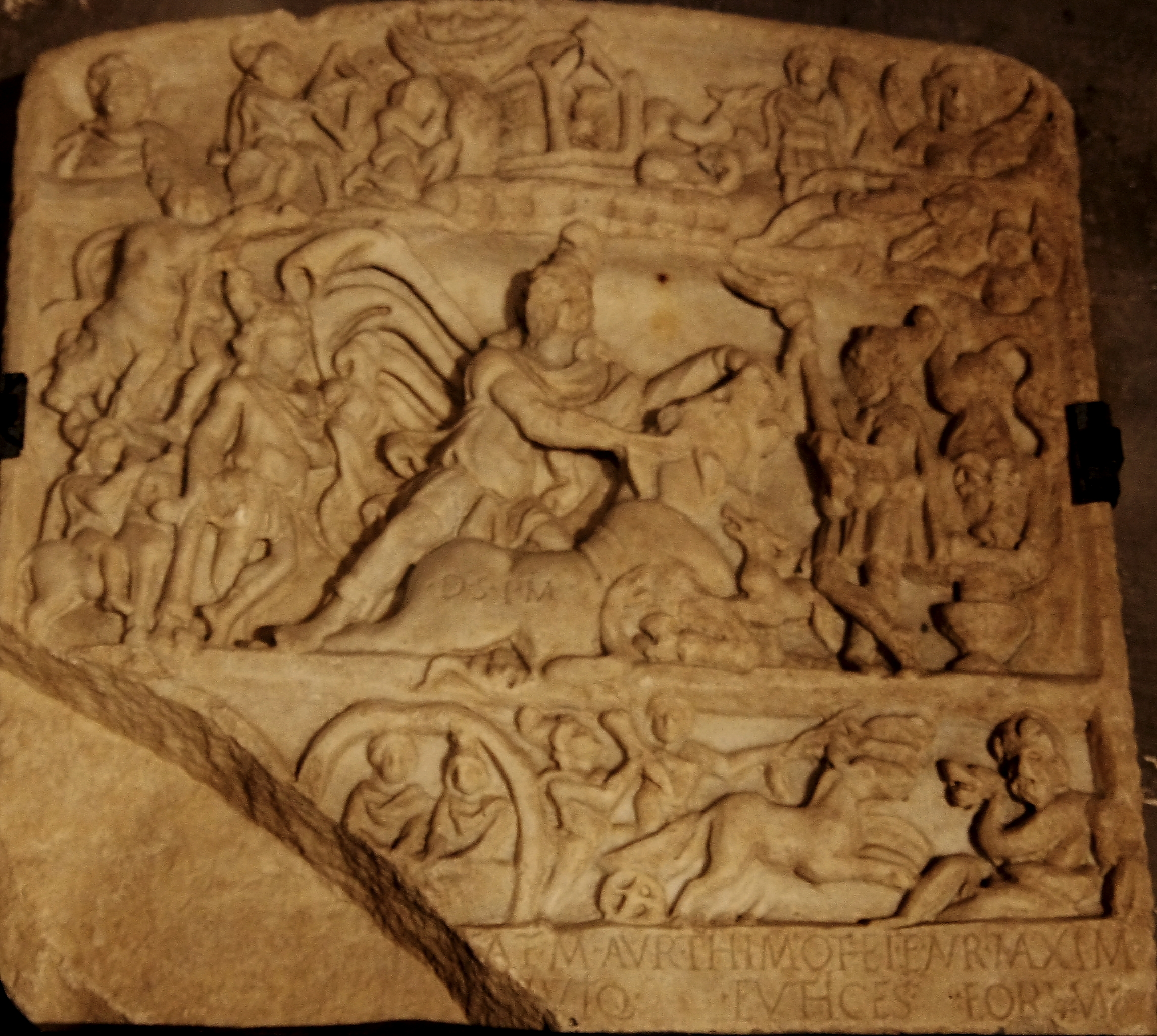
CIMRM 1935: Tauroctonous Mithras from the Maros Porto mithraeum (Mureș port, Romania). Now at Brukenthal National Museum.

In the wake of the 1970s dismantling of the Cumontian transfer scenario, Cumont's trivialization of the astronomical/astrological aspects of the Mysteries as "intellectual diversions designed to amuse the neophytes" has yielded to the general recognition that the astronomical/astrological aspects were part of the fundamental premises of the cult. This recognition is not new; "[s]ince the time of Celsus (around 178), author of Alēthēs Logos, it has been known [via Origen's Contra Celsum] that the Mithraic mysteries relate to fixed stars and planets."

In the post-Cumontian period, this recognition was first revived by Stanley Insler (second congress, 1975), who pointed out that the tauroctony could be interpreted solely in terms of the Greco-Roman understanding of astronomical phenomena. Likewise, Richard L. Gordon (1976) cautioned against overlooking the importance of the cult's astronomical symbolism.

Four contemporaneous articles (1976–1977) by Roger Beck stressed the role of astronomy/astrology in the context of Greco-Roman religious thought. Beck thought it ironic that Cumont, "who was himself one of the most eminent scholars of ancient astrology, (Note: Cumont was the author of the popular Astrology and Religion among the Greeks and Romans (1912), the more specialist L'Égypte des astrologues (1937), and also co-founder and co-editor of the multi-volume Catalogus Codicum Astrologorum Graecorum (1898–1953).) should have been unaware of this implication. [Cumont's] preoccupation with "les traditiones iraniennes" had blinkered him."

Since the 1970s, the zodiacal symbolism in the scene has provoked much speculation that the cult relief represents some sort of "star-map" code that poses a riddle of Mithras' identity. Beck (2006) summarizes them as follows:

Author	Year proposed	Tauroctonous Mithras represents
Alessandro Bausani	1979	Leo
Michael Speidel	1980	Orion
Karl-Gustav Sandelin	1988	Auriga
David Ulansey	1989	Perseus
John David North	1990	Betelgeuse
Roger Beck	1994	the Sun in Leo
Maria Weiss	1994, 1998	the night sky

Stanley Insler (1978) and Bruno Jacobs (1999) identify the entire bull-killing scene with the heliacal setting of Taurus. In 2006, Roger Beck found all these approaches "lacked persuasiveness" because they were "ungrounded in proper contextual soil." There is no consensus on the issue.

== Legacy ==
The image was adapted for a Prix de Rome sculpture of The Madness of Orestes by Raymond Barthélemy (1860); the prize-winning plaster model remains in the collection of the École Nationale Supérieure des Beaux-Arts, where it was included in the 2004 travelling exhibition Dieux et Mortels.

== Bibliography ==
- Beck, Roger (1976a). "Interpreting the Ponza Zodiac". Journal of Mithraic Studies. 1 (1): 1–19.
- Beck, Roger (1976b). "The seat of Mithras at the equinoxes: Porphyry de antro nympharum 24". Journal of Mithraic Studies. 1 (1): 95–98.
- Beck, Roger (1976c). "A note on the scorpion in the tauroctony". Journal of Mithraic Studies. 1 (2): 208–209.
- Beck, Roger (1977). "Cautes and Cautopates: some astronomical considerations". Journal of Mithraic Studies. 2 (1): 1–17.
- Beck, Roger (1984). "Mithraism since Franz Cumont". In Haase, Wolfgang (ed.). Heidentum: Römische Götterkulte, Orientalische Kulte in der römischen Welt. Aufstieg und Niedergang der römischen Welt. Vol. II.17, 4. Berlin: Walter de Gruyter. pp. 2002–2115.
- Beck, Roger (1998). "The Mysteries of Mithras: A new account of their genesis". Journal of Roman Studies. 88: 115–128. doi:10.1017/s0075435800044130.
- Beck, Roger (2004a). "Mithraism after 'Mithraism since Franz Cumont', 1984-2003". Beck on Mithraism: Collected works with new essays. Ashgate. pp. 3–24.
- Beck, Roger (2004b), "The rise and fall of the astral identifications of the tauroctonous Mithras", Beck on Mithraism: Collected works with new essays, Ashgate, pp. 235–249
- Beck, Roger (2004c), "Astral symbolism in the Tauroctony", Beck on Mithraism: Collected works with new essays, Ashgate, pp. 251–266
- Beck, Roger (2006). The Religion of the Mithras Cult in the Roman Empire: Mysteries of the unconquered sun. Oxford University Press. ISBN 0198140894.
- Bianchi, Ugo (1976). "The Second International Congress of Mithraic Studies (Tehran, September 1975)". Journal of Mithraic Studies. 1: 77–94.
- Chapman-Rietschi, Peter A. L. (1997). "Astronomical conceptions in Mithraic iconography". Journal of the Royal Astronomical Society of Canada. 91: 133–134. Bibcode:1997JRASC..91..133C.
- Clauss, Manfred (1992). Cultores Mithrae. Die Anhängerschaft des Mithras-Kultes. Heidelberger Althistorische Beiträge und Epigraphische Studien (HABES). Vol. 10. Stuttgart: Steiner.
- Clauss, Manfred (2000). The Roman Cult of Mithras: The god and his mysteries. Translated by Gordon, R. L. New York: Routledge..
- Cumont, Franz (1896). Textes et monuments figurés relatifs aux mystères de Mithra. Vol. II Textes littéraires et epigraphiques. Brussels: Lamartin.
- Cumont, Franz (1903). The Mysteries of Mithra. Translated by McCormack, Thomas J. (2nd ed.). Chicago: Open Court; London: Kegan Paul, Trench, Trübner, fasc. repr. New York: Dover, 1956
- Gordon, Richard L. (1976), "The sacred geography of a mithraeum; the example of Sette Sfere", Journal of Mithraic Studies, 1 (2): 119–165.
- Gordon, Richard (1978), "The date and significance of CIMRM 593 (British Museum, Townley Collection)", Journal of Mithraic Studies, 2 (2): 148–174.
- Gordon, Richard (1994), "Who worshipped Mithras?", Journal of Roman Archaeology, 7: 450–474.
- Gordon, Richard L. (1980), "Panelled Complications", Journal of Mithraic Studies, 3 (1–2): 200–227.
- Hinnells, John R. (1975), "Reflections on the bull-slaying scene", in Hinnells, John R. (ed.), Mithraic studies: Proceedings of the First International Congress of Mithraic Studies, Manchester UP, pp. II.290–312.
- Merkelbach, Reinhold (1984), Mithras, Königstein: Hain.
- Vermaseren, M. J. (1956, 1960), Corpus inscriptionum et monumentorum religionis mithriacae, 2 vols., The Hague: Martinus Nijhoff.
