= P. A. L. Chapman-Rietschi =

Peter Albert Leslie Chapman-Rietschi (1945-2017) was an independent scholar and research writer in the field of history of astronomy, ancient astral sciences, archaeoastronomy, and astrobiology, including bioastronomy and SETI.

He was a Fellow of the Royal Astronomical Society and in former years also Fellow of the Royal Astronomical Society of Canada and Member of the Egypt Exploration Society.

== Publications ==
- Pre-telescopic Astronomy: Invisible 'Planets' Rahu and Ketu. Quarterly Journal of the Royal Astronomical Society, 32, 53–55, 1991
- The Plurality of Worlds. The Observatory, 111, 312, 1991
- The Fronties of Life. The Observatory, 112, 145, 1992
- Nonclassical SETI. The Observatory, 114, 175, 1994
- The Beijing Ancient Observatory and Intercultural Contacts. The Journal of the Royal Astronomical Society of Canada, 88, 24–38, 1994
- The Colour of Sirius in Ancient Times. Quarterly Journal of the Royal Astronomical Society, 36, 337–350, 1995
- Astronomers and Missionaries in Old Beijing. Quarterly Journal of the Royal Astronomical Society, 36, 273-274, 1995
- The Privatized World of SETI. The Observatory, 115, 135, 1995
- The Star seen in the East. The Observatory, 115, 329-330, 1995
- Venus as the Star of Bethlehem. Quarterly Journal of the Royal Astronomical Society, 37, 843-844, 1996
- Astronomical Conceptions in Mithraic Iconography. The Journal of the Royal Astronomical Society of Canada, 91, 133-134, 1997
- SETI, Forty Years on. The Observatory, 120, 403-404, 2000
- The beginnings of SETI. Astronomy & Geophysics, 44, 1.7, 2003
- Astrobiology. The Observatory, 127, 191, 2007
- The First SETI Scans. The Observatory, 130, 172-173, 2010
- Factor L of the Drake Equation. The Observatory, 131, 391-392, 2011
- The Colour Black and the Planet Saturn. The Observatory, 133, 41–42, 2013

== Book reviews ==
- Extraterrestrials. Where Are They?, B. Zuckerman and M.H. Hart. Cambridge University Press. The Observatory, 116, 182–183, 1996
- The Sirius Mystery, R. Temple. Century London. The Observatory, 118, 245-246, 1998
- Astrobiology: Future Perspectives, P. Ehrenfreund et al. Kluwer-Springer Dordrecht The Observatory, 125, 278–279, 2005
- Contact with Alien Civilisations, M.A.G. Michaud. Springer Heidelberg. The Observatory, 127, 341–342, 2007
- The Living Cosmos, C. Impey. Cambridge University Press. The Observatory, 132, 45–46, 2012
- We are the Martians: Connecting Cosmology with Biology, G.F. Bignami. Springer Heidelberg. The Observatory, 133, 108–109, 2013
- Signatures of Life: Science Searches the Universe, E. Ashpole. Prometheus Arnherst. The Observatory, 133, 370, 2013
- Elephants in Space: The Past, Present and Future of Life and the Universe, B. Moore. Springer Heidelberg. The Observatory, 135, 108–109, 2015
- Astrobiological Neurosystems, J.L. Cranford. Springer Heidelberg. The Observatory, 136, 93–95, 2016
- The Hunt for Alien Life: A Wider Perspective, P. Linde. Springer Heidelberg. The Observatory, 137, 86–87, 2017

== Conference Papers ==
- Frontiers of Life. 3rd 'Rencontres de Blois', October 1991 (summary of bioastronomy talks). The Observatory, 112, 145–147, 1992
- Philosophy, Star Transformations and Okeanos. 3rd Conference of the 'International Association Cosmos and Philosophy' (IACP) 1991, Mytilene. In: Diotima, Institut de Philosophie de l'Université d'Athènes, J. Vrin, Paris, 21, 83–86, 1993.
- Sappho and the Astral Sciences, co-work with Anne Chapman-Rietschi. In: 14th Conference of the 'Société Européenne pour l'Astronomie dans la Culture' (SEAC) 2006, Rhodes and 17th IACP 2007, Athens. In: Ordre et Liberté: L'Univers Cosmique et Human, I.P.R. Athènes, 123–128, 2011, and In: Philosophia, Academy of Athens, 42, 75–79, 2012
- Catherine of Alexandria and the Art of Sacred Astronomy, co-work with Anne Chapman-Rietschi. In: 19th IACP 2010, Athens. In: Ordre et Liberté: L'Univers Cosmique et Human, I.P.R. Athènes, 159–167, 2011, and In: Diotima, Institut de Philosophie de l'Université d'Athènes, J. Vrin, Paris, 41, 153–161, 2013.
- Other Worlds, Other Life. 11th IACP 2000, Prague. In: Cosmological Viewpoints, St. Kliment Ohridski University Press, Sofia, 138–140, 2015.
- ETI and Humankind. 12th IACP 2001, Aegina. In : Cosmological Viewpoints, St. Kliment Ohridski University Press, Sofia, 189–192, 2015.

== Key to conferences ==
- IACP = International Association Cosmos and Philosophy
- INSAP = The Inspiration of Astronomical Phenomena
- SEAC = Société pour l'Astronomie dans la Culture
