= Cautes and Cautopates =

Figures in the ancient Roman cult of Mithraism

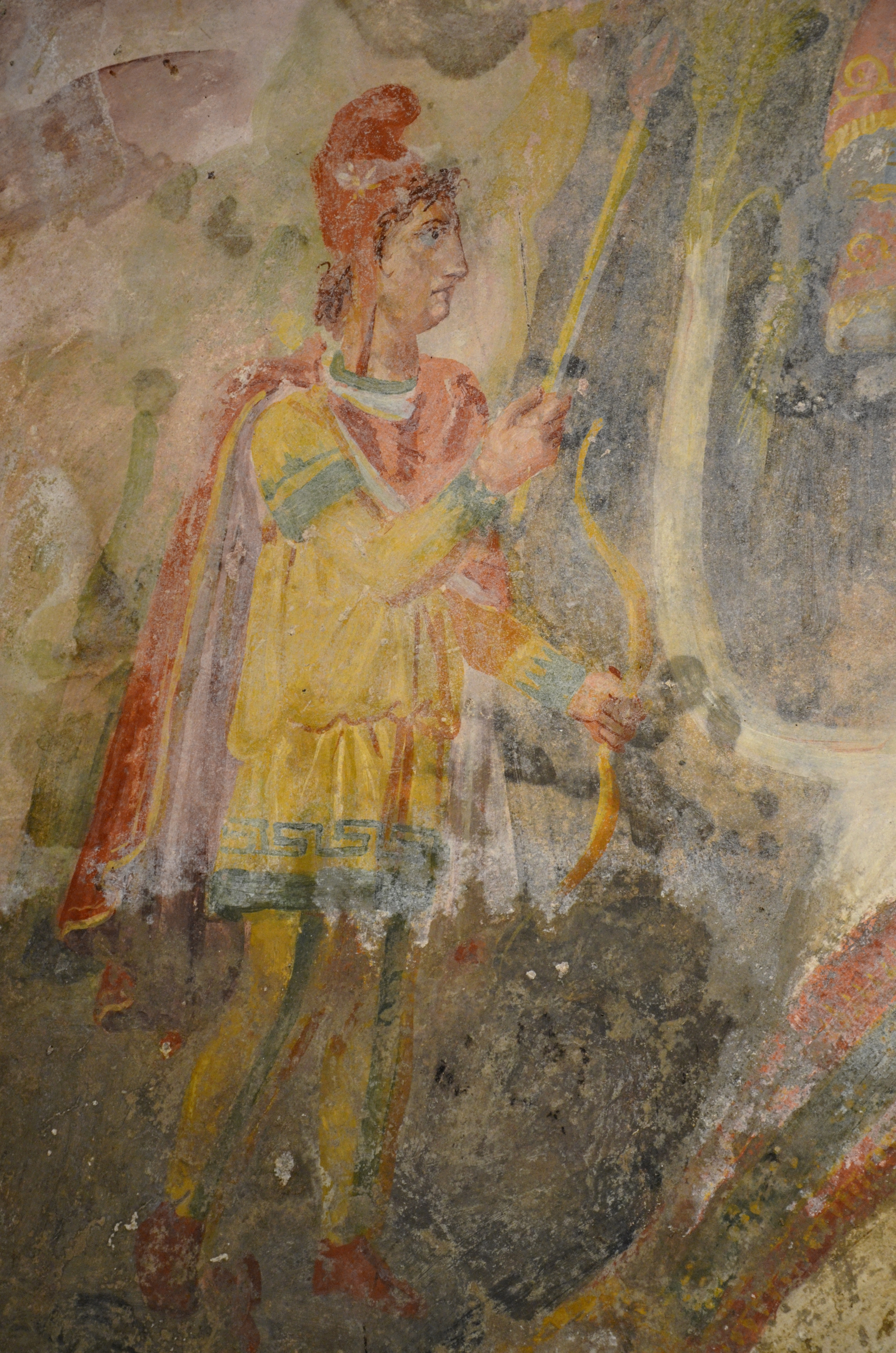
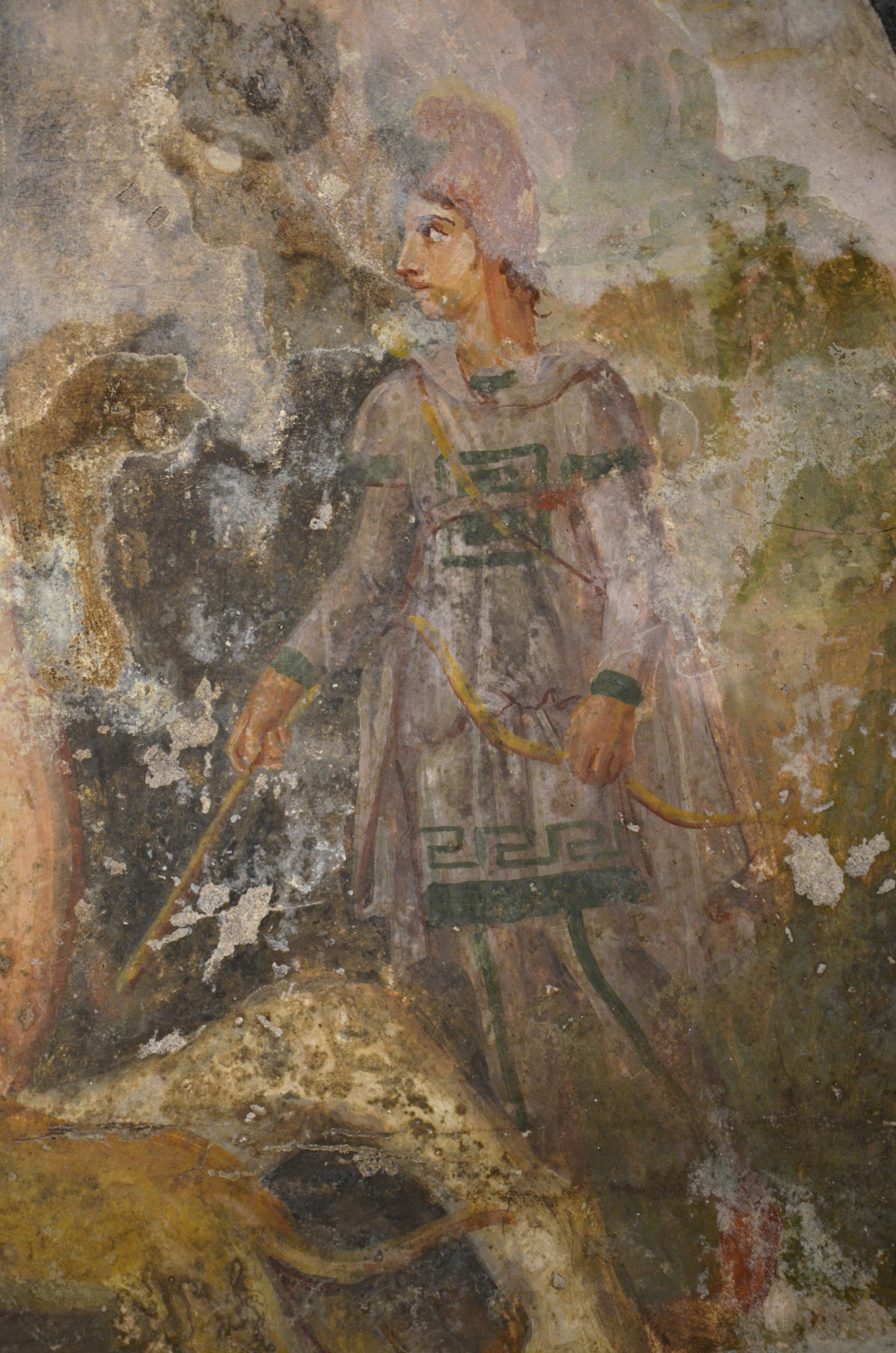
Tauroctony fresco in the mithraeum of Capua, details of the torchbearers Cautes and Cautopates, 2nd century AD

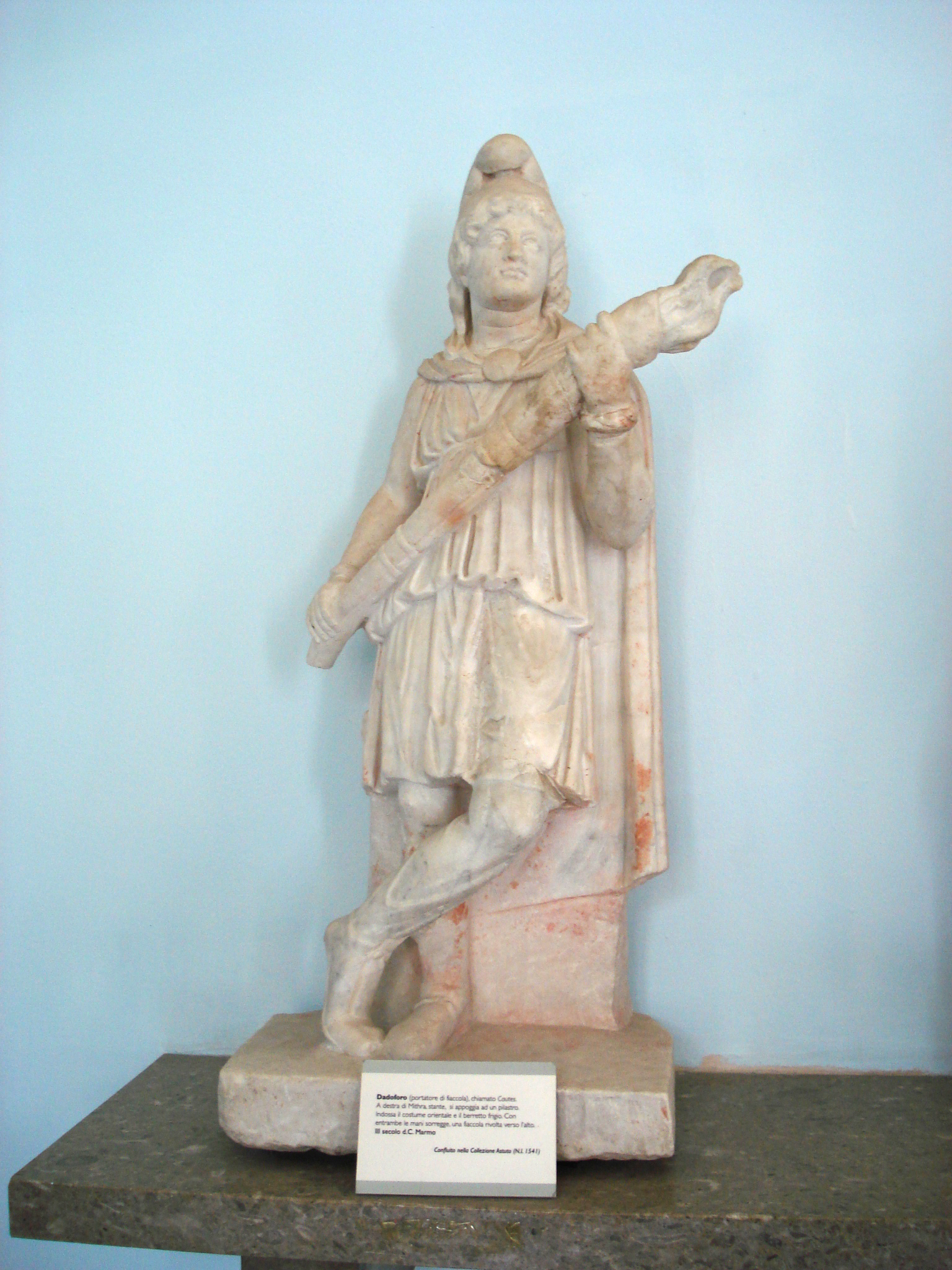
Cautes from a group of Mithras figures in the Museo Archeologico Regionale, Palermo, 3rd century AD

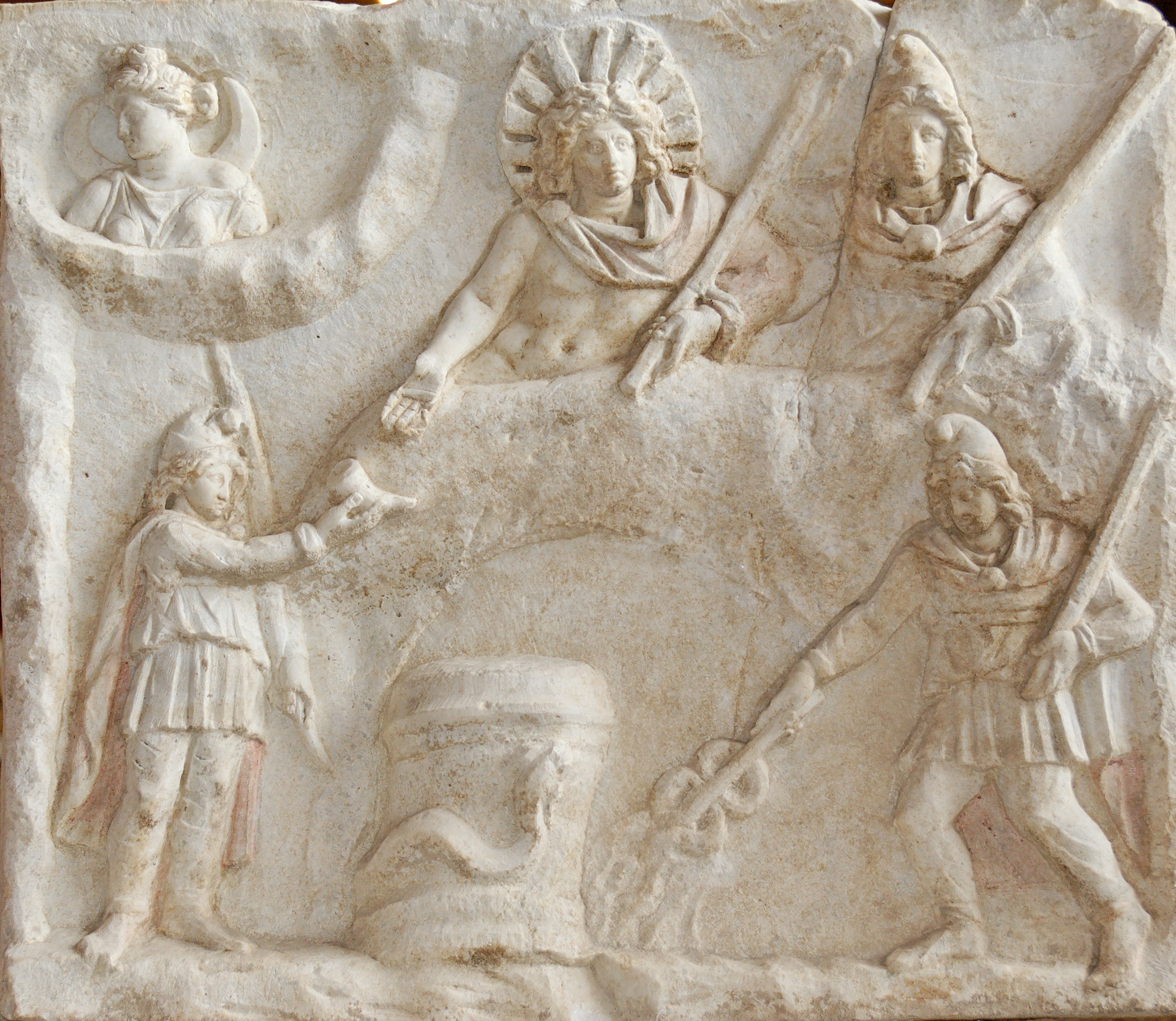
Banquet scene on the Fiano Romano Mithraic relief. At bottom are Cautes (l) and Cautopates (r).

Cautes and Cautopates are torch-bearers depicted attending the god Mithras in the icons of the ancient Roman cult of Mithraism, known as Tauroctony. Cautes holds his torch raised up, and Cautopates holds his torch pointed downward.

== Interpretation ==
In Mithraic images, Mithras either represents the sun, or is a close friend of the sun god Helios or Sol Invictus (Latin: the invincible sun) with whom Mithras dines. So attendants Cautes and Cautopates are supposed to represent the stations of sunrise and sunset respectively, or perhaps the spring and autumn equinoxes, or equivalently the ascending (spring) and descending (autumnal) nodes of the Sun's apparent path on the celestial sphere. If eclipses of the sun and moon formed part of Mithraic symbolism, they could also represent the ascending and descending nodes where the Moon crosses the ecliptic.

== Depictions ==
Both are depicted as smaller than Mithras to emphasize his significance, and both wear Persian style garments, notably a Phrygian cap, to emphasize the supposed oriental origins of the cult.

Cautes holds a burning torch pointed up, whereas Cautopates holds a burning torch pointed down. Cautopates is usually depicted on the left, but not always. They are often shown standing with their legs crossed, but not always.

The two torch-bearers are often interpreted as symbols of light, one for the rising, the other for the setting sun. Cautopates could also represent death, while Cautes might represent new life.

An alternative interpretation advanced by David Ulansey is that Cautes represents the spring equinox and Cautopates the autumn equinox. Thus, represented on the left and right of the Tauroctony, they become a realistic cadre of the celestial equator and the constellations included between the two equinoxes during the Age of Taurus.

M. J. Vermasaren shows Mithras, the unconquerable sun, and his two torch-bearers, Cautes, sunrise, and Cautopates, sunset, equally sized in a 3-branch pine tree, visible at Dieburg, Germany. Vermasaren suggests they form a Mithraic "Trinity".

== See also ==
- Selene
